= 2008 in Palestine =

- Decades: 1980s; 1990s; 2000s; 2010s; 2020s
- See also: History of Palestine · Timeline of Palestinian history · List of years in Palestine

Events in the year 2008 in Palestine.

== Incumbents ==
Palestinian National Authority (non-state administrative authority)

- President – Mahmoud Abbas (PLO)
- Prime Minister –
  - Prime Minister of the Palestinian National Authority (in the West Bank) – Salam Fayyad (Third Way) (emergency rule)
  - Prime Minister of the Palestinian National Authority (in the Gaza Strip) – Ismail Haniyeh (Hamas) (in rebellion against the Palestinian National Authority)
- Government of Palestine – 12th Government of Palestine

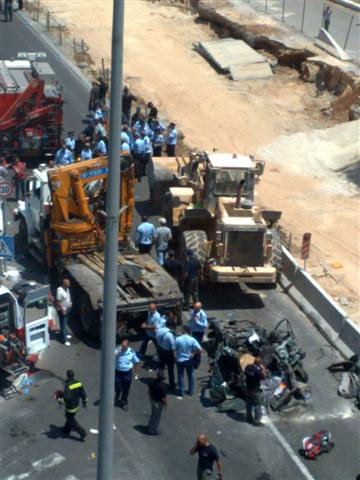
the loader used in the Jerusalem bulldozer attack on July 2, 2008 and a car which was destroyed during the attack

== Events ==
- January 1 – Israeli settlers from the Efrat and El'eazar settlements ignited a fire in a 700-year-old mosque situated on the lands of Al Khader village, close to the settlements near Bethlehem.
- January 21 – Gaza’s only power plant shuts down due to an Israeli fuel blockade, plunging parts of the territory into darkness.
- January 24 – Two Palestinian Arabs infiltrate a religious seminary and stab three students in the West Bank settlement of Kfar Etzion before being shot dead.
- January 24 – Palestinian Arab gunmen open fire on Israelis outside the Shuafat refugee camp on the outskirts of Jerusalem, killing a border police officer and seriously wounding a female officer.
- February 4 – 2008 Dimona suicide bombing: A suicide attack carried out by Hamas at a shopping centre in Dimona, Israel. One Israeli elderly woman is killed in the attack while nine other people are wounded (one of them critically). Hamas claims responsibility for the attack.
- February 27 – A Palestinian baby less than a year old was killed in Israeli strikes in the Gaza Strip. Over 46 Qassam rockets were also fired by Palestinian Arab militants into the Western Negev and Israel's Southern Mediterranean coast, many of them hit the city of Ashkelon and the town of Sderot, among other Israeli towns and villages in the area. One of the rockets that landed in a parking lot at the Sapir Academic College killed 47-year-old Israeli student, Ronni Yechia.
- February 28 – March 3 – Operation Hot Winter: Israel Defense Forces military campaign in the Gaza Strip is launched in response to the constant firing of Qassam rockets from the Strip by Hamas militants. Four Palestinian children, aged 10, 12, 13 and 15, playing football in the Gaza Strip were killed by an Israeli strike.
- March 1 – Israel’s deadliest Gaza assault since Hamas took power kills at least 60 Palestinians, and destroys Hamas PM Ismail Haniyeh’s office.
- March 6 – Mercaz HaRav massacre: Eight Israeli civilians are killed and 9 wounded when a Palestinian Arab attacker opens fire at a Jewish seminary in Jerusalem.
- May 14 – A Katyusha rocket is fired at the Israeli city of Ashqelon striking a clinic on the third floor of the Huzot shopping mall, serious wounding three people, moderately wounding two and with eleven other people suffering minor wounds. The Popular Front for the Liberation of Palestine claims responsibility.
- June 6 – An Israeli man is killed and four other people are wounded when Hamas militants in the Gaza Strip fire a mortar shell at kibbutz Nirim in the western Negev desert.
- June 8 – Four masked settlers with clubs attacked three members of a Palestinian family who were grazing their flock on private Palestinian land south of the Susiya settlement, with the victims suffering severe injuries requiring hospitalization.
- June 19 – A 6-month Egyptian-brokered ceasefire between Israel and Hamas in Gaza goes into effect at 6:00 AM; Israeli forces agree to ease the blockade, and Palestinian militants agree to halt attacks.
- July 2 – Jerusalem bulldozer attack: A Palestinian Arab resident of east Jerusalem attacks several cars on the Jaffa Road in Jerusalem using a front-end loader (erroneously referred to as a bulldozer in the media), killing three people and wounding at least 30 other pedestrians, before being shot to death.
- July 4 – Hamas suspends prisoner swap talks amid disputes over the Israeli blockade and Gaza rocket fire.
- July 16 – Hezbollah swaps the bodies of 199 Palestinian Arab and Lebanese militants, four Hezbollah prisoners captured during the 2006 Lebanon war and the Lebanese Druze militant Samir Kuntar in exchange for the bodies of the Israeli soldiers Ehud Goldwasser and Eldad Regev.
- August 12 – President Mahmoud Abbas rejects Israeli PM Ehud Olmert's peace proposal over borders, Jerusalem, and settlements.
- August 25 – Israel releases 199 Palestinian Arab prisoners as a goodwill gesture to the President of the Palestinian National Authority, Mahmoud Abbas, as the United States Secretary of State, Condoleezza Rice, visits the area.
- September 22 – At least 19 people are wounded when a Palestinian Arab drives his car into a crowd of IDF soldiers at a busy intersection in Jerusalem. The driver is shot and killed at the scene by an Israeli soldier.
- October 28 – Ersal Commercial Center, ground breaking, co-sponsored by the Palestine Investment Fund (PIF) and Saudi real estate company, The Land Holding.
- November 15 – Palestine celebrates the 20th anniversary of the Palestinian Declaration of Independence.
- November 23 –
  - 2008 Palestinian presidential election: The PLO Central Council elects Mahmoud Abbas as President of the State of Palestine.
  - 2008 Palestinian presidential inauguration: Mahmoud Abbas assumes office as the second president of the State of Palestine in official capacity, the same day he was elected. Abbas had formally served as acting president of the State of Palestine since 8 May 2005 and informally since 15 January 2005, in addition to his role as president of the Palestinian National Authority since 15 January 2005.
- December 4 – Israeli settlers in Hebron attack and shoot at Palestinians, also setting fires to Palestinian trees and attacking Palestinian homes.
- December 19 –
  - The 6-month ceasefire between Israel and Hamas expires without agreement on an extension.
  - Fifteen international activists, including two from a Qatari charity, sail from Larnaca, Cyprus, to Gaza delivering medical aid in defiance of the Israeli blockade.
- December 27, 2008 – January 18, 2009 – Operation Cast Lead: A large-scale three-week IDF military campaign in the Gaza Strip seriously damages the paramilitary infrastructure of Hamas. Israel claims that the strikes are a response to frequent Qassam rocket and mortar fire from the Strip on Israel's southern civilian communities.

== Political Developments ==
- Palestinian National Authority: Mahmoud Abbas served as President, and Salam Fayyad was the Prime Minister in the West Bank, while Ismail Haniyeh was the Prime Minister in the Gaza Strip.
- Hamas and Fatah: The internal conflict between Hamas and Fatah continued, with Hamas controlling the Gaza Strip and Fatah governing parts of the West Bank.

== Notable deaths ==
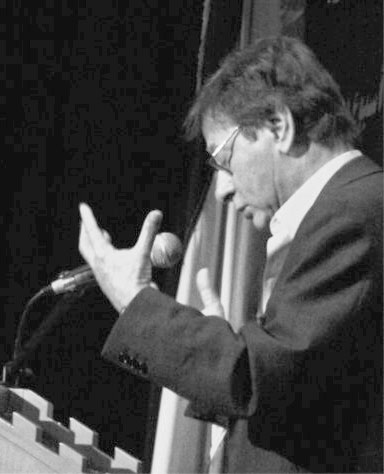
Mahmoud Darwish

- January 26 – George Habash, 81, Palestinian founder of the Popular Front for the Liberation of Palestine, heart attack.
- April 16 – Fadel Shana'a, 23, Palestinian Reuters cameraman, flechette shell.
- August 9 – Mahmoud Darwish, 67, Palestinian poet, complications from open heart surgery.

=== Full date unknown ===
- Serene Husseini Shahid, Palestinian writer and teacher.(born 1920)

== See also ==
- 2008 in Israel
- 2007–present blockade of the Gaza Strip
- Timeline of the Israeli–Palestinian conflict in 2008
