= 2005 in Israel =

- Decades: 1980s; 1990s; 2000s; 2010s; 2020s
- See also: History of Israel; Timeline of Israeli history; List of years in Israel

Events in the year 2005 in Israel.

== Incumbents ==
- President of Israel – Moshe Katsav
- Prime Minister of Israel – Ariel Sharon (Likud until November 21, Kadima)
- President of the Supreme Court – Aharon Barak
- Chief of General Staff – Moshe Ya'alon until June 1, Dan Halutz
- Government of Israel – 30th Government of Israel

== Events ==
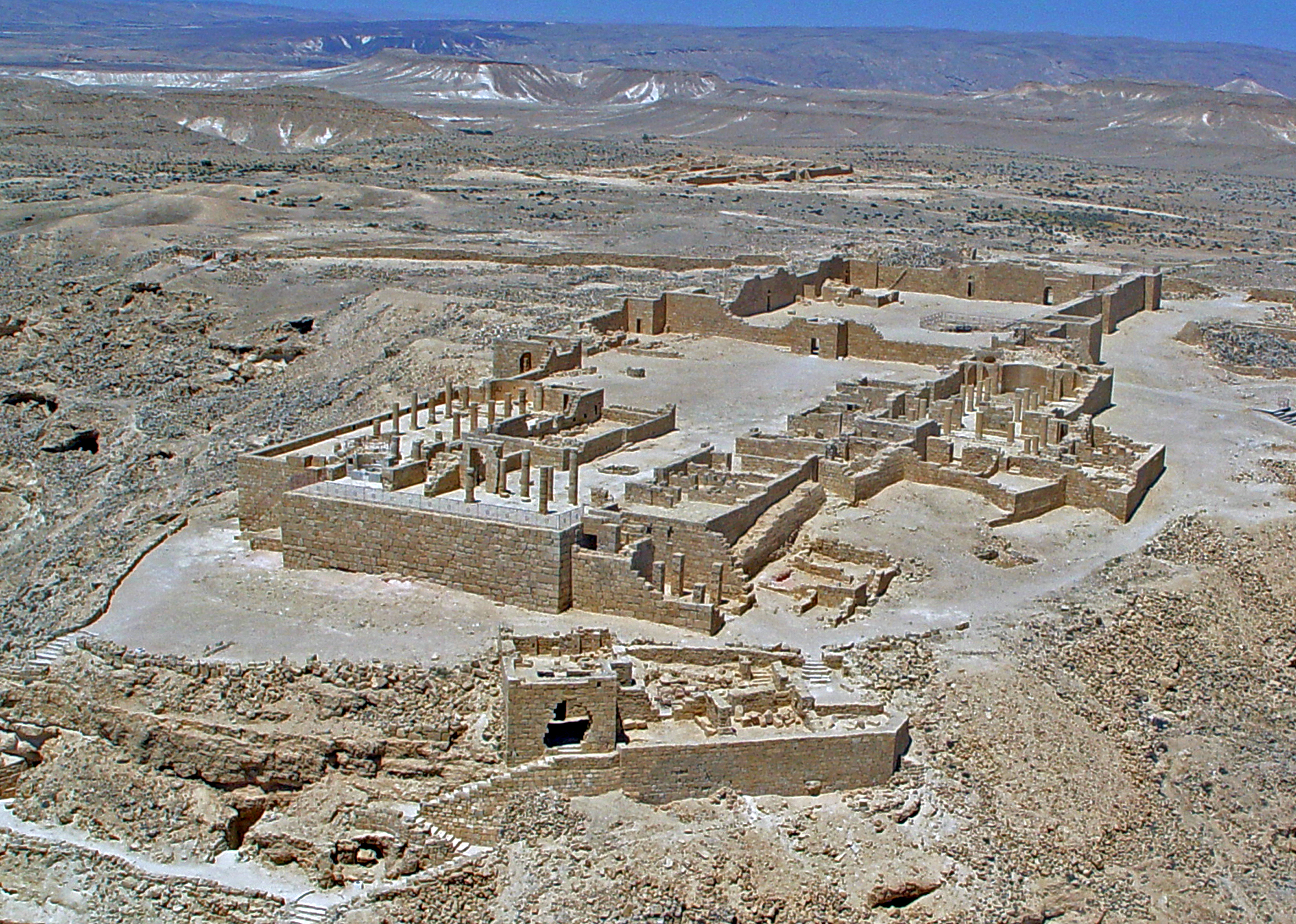
The Incense Route – Desert Cities in the Negev (which includes the four Nabatean towns of Haluza, Mamshit, Avdat and Shivta) and the Biblical Tels of Tel Megiddo, Tel Hazor and Tel Be'er Sheva are designated by UNESCO as World Heritage Sites

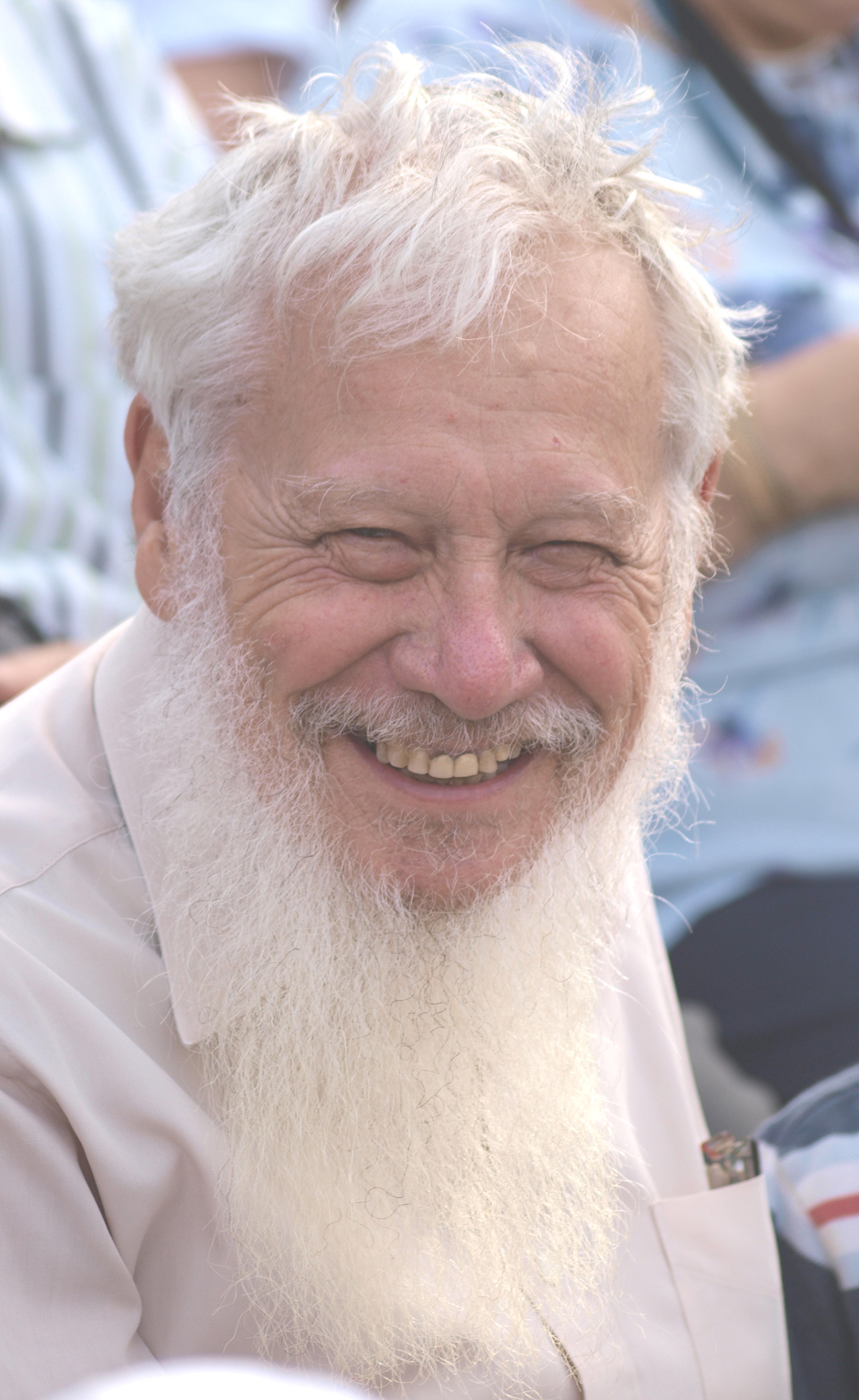
Robert Aumann is awarded the 2005 Nobel Memorial Prize in Economics

- February 8 - The Sharm el-Sheikh Summit: Palestinian Authority President Mahmoud Abbas declares violence will come to an end, and Israeli Prime Minister Ariel Sharon agrees to release 900 Palestinian prisoners and withdraw Israeli forces from areas of the West Bank. This is considered to be the "official" end of the Second Intifada, although sporadic violence would continue outside PA control.
- March 31 – The Government of Israel officially recognizes the Bnei Menashe people of North-East India as one of the Ten Lost Tribes of Israel, opening the door for thousands of people to immigrate to Israel.
- 21 May – Shiri Maimon represents Israel at the Eurovision Song Contest with the song “HaSheket SheNish'ar” ("The Silence that Remains"), achieving 4th place.
- May 31 – Israeli Police announce that they have uncovered an Industrial espionage ring involving executives at several major Israeli corporations which used Trojan horse viruses to hack into rivals' systems.
- June 1 – Dan Halutz, the former Israeli Air Force commander, was appointed as the 18th Chief of Staff of the Israel Defense Forces.
- June 21 – A severe collision that takes place between a train and a truck leads to eight people dead and approximately 200 injured.
- 11–23 July – The 17th Maccabiah Games are held with over 7,300 athletes from Israel and Jewish communities throughout the world competing.
- July 15 – The Incense Route – Desert Cities in the Negev (which includes the four Nabatean towns of Haluza, Mamshit, Avdat and Shivta) and the Biblical Tels of Tel Megiddo, Tel Hazor and Tel Be'er Sheva are designated by UNESCO as World Heritage Sites.
- August 4 – Four Israeli Arabs are killed and twenty-two others are wounded by the 19-year-old IDF deserter, Eden Nathan-Zadah, when he opens fire on a crowded bus in the Arab town of Shfar'am in northern Israel in northern Israel. When he runs out of bullets, Natan-Zada is beaten to death by the crowd, as recorded on video. No group had taken responsibility for the terror attack and an official in the settler movement denounced it. Prime Minister Ariel Sharon and several Israeli leaders condemn the attack and offer condolences to the families.
- August 7 – Benjamin Netanyahu, the former Prime Minister of Israel, resigns his cabinet post as Finance Minister in protest against the planned Israeli withdrawal from the Gaza Strip. Deputy Prime Minister Ehud Olmert is appointed to succeed him.
- August 28 – Omri Sharon, Israeli politician and son of the Prime Minister Ariel Sharon, is formally indicted, charged with felonies of political corruption and with perjury, following his involvement in a scandal relating to fundraising for his father's 1999 Likud leadership campaign.
- October 10 – Robert Aumann received the Nobel Memorial Prize in Economics along with Thomas Schelling for his work on conflict and cooperation through game-theory analysis.
- October 26 – During a key speech at the "World without Zionism" conference held in Teheran, Iranian President Mahmoud Ahmadinejad quotes the founder of the Islamic Republic of Iran, Ayatollah Ruhollah Khomeini, who called for the destruction of Israel, calling Israel a "disgraceful blot" that should be "wiped off the map". an English idiom which means to "cause a place to stop existing", or to "obliterate totally", or "destroy completely".
- October 27 – Israeli Prime Minister Ariel Sharon calls for the expulsion of Iran from the United Nations after the Iranian President repeated Ruhollah Khomeini's call for Israel to be "wiped off the map".
- November 21 – Israeli Prime Minister Ariel Sharon resigns as head of the Likud party, and dissolved the Knesset to form a new centrist party, subsequently named Kadima ("Forward").
- December 18 – The Prime Minister Ariel Sharon is transferred to the Hadassah Ein Kerem hospital in Jerusalem after suffering a minor stroke. After being treated, Sharon is released from the hospital two days later and is scheduled to undergo a routine Cardiac catheterization procedure on January 4 to seal a hole in his heart.

=== Israeli–Palestinian conflict ===
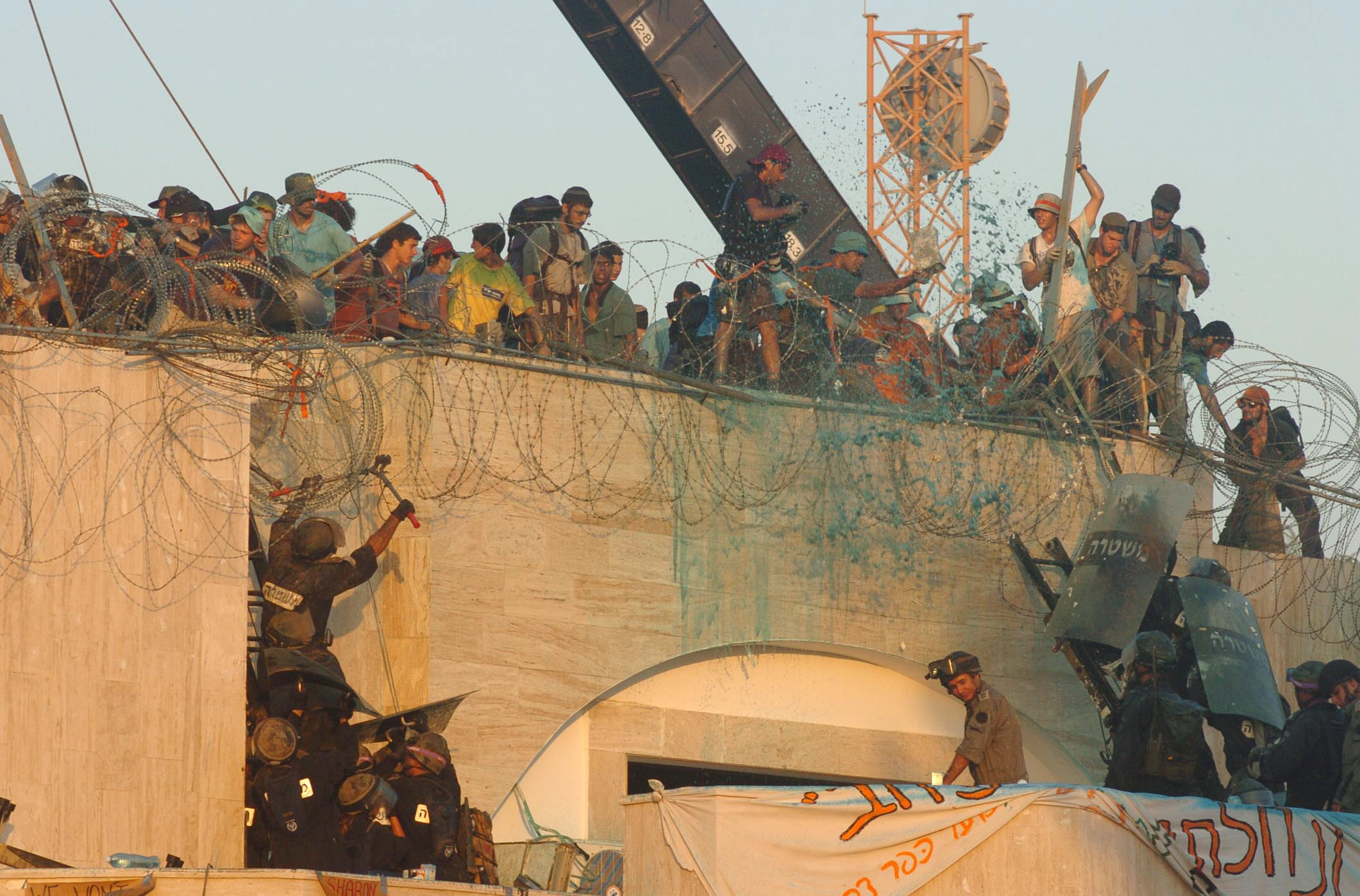
Israel's unilateral disengagement plan: Photo of residents riot during the forced evacuation of the Israeli community Kfar Darom. August 18, 2005.

The most prominent events related to the Israeli–Palestinian conflict which occurred during 2005 include:

- February 16 – The Knesset finalizes and approves Israel's unilateral disengagement plan with 59 in favor, 40 opposed, 5 abstaining.
- February 21 – Israel releases 500 Palestinian Arab prisoners, as a gesture of goodwill to the Palestinian Authority and to its chairman, Mahmoud Abbas. Israel plans to release another 400 Palestinian prisoners within the subsequent three months.
- March 16 – Israel formally hands over Jericho to Palestinian Authority control, which is likely to strengthen Mahmoud Abbas.
- March 22 – Israel hands over control of Tulkarm to the Palestinian Authority.
- June 2 – Israel released 398 Palestinian Arab prisoners, the final phase of an Israeli pledge to release 900 prisoners as a goodwill gesture towards Palestinian Arab leader Mahmoud Abbas.
- August 9 – Israel orders Israeli settlers in the Gaza Strip to leave their settlements or face eviction.
- August 11 – Tens of thousands of Israelis converged on Tel Aviv to protest the proposed removal of Israeli settlements from the Gaza Strip.
- August 15 – The beginning of the implementation of the disengagement plan from Gush Katif in the Gaza Strip.
- August 17 – Israel's unilateral disengagement: The first forced evacuation of Jewish settlers, as part of the disengagement, commenced under Maj. Gen. Dan Harel of the Southern Command's orders. About 14,000 Israeli soldiers and police prepared to forcibly evict settlers and "mistanenim" (infiltrators). There are scenes of troops dragging screaming settlers from houses and synagogues, but with less violence than expected.
- August 17 – An Israeli settler kills three Palestinian Arab civilians in the West Bank. The attack is condemned by Ariel Sharon as a "Jewish Terror act" and "twisted thinking" while Hamas claimed the right to avenge the deaths.
- August 23 – Israel's unilateral disengagement: The evacuation of 25 Jewish settlements in the Gaza Strip and West Bank is accomplished.
- September 12 – Israel withdraws the last of its troops from the Gaza Strip, effectively completing its unilateral disengagement plan.

==== Notable Palestinian militant operations against Israeli targets ====
The most prominent Palestinian militant acts and operations committed against Israeli targets during 2005 include:

- January 12 – Morag attack: One Israeli civilian is killed and three IDF soldiers are wounded when a bomb is detonated against a military vehicle patrolling the route near Morag. Two terrorists are killed by IDF forces. The area was booby-trapped with explosive devices, in addition to the bomb that exploded. Palestinian Islamic Jihad claims responsibility.
- January 13 – Karni border crossing attack: Palestinian Arab militants suicide truck bomb attacks the Karni crossing in the eastern Gaza Strip. At least six Israelis are killed, as well as three of the attackers, and about 10–20 are wounded in the attack. The al-Aqsa Martyrs' Brigades, the Popular Resistance Committees and Hamas claim joint responsibility.
- January 18 – Gush Katif checkpoint attack
- February 25 – Stage Club bombing: A Palestinian Arab teenage suicide bomber blows himself up at the entrance to the "Stage" Club in Tel Aviv. Five Israelis are killed, and about 50 wounded. Islamic Jihad claims responsibility.
- February 28 – Israeli security forces intercept a car bomb in the Arrabah village near Jenin. The 200 kg explosive device, believed to have been the work of Palestinian Islamic Jihad, is later defused by IDF sappers.
- June 20 – A Palestinian female suicide bomber is caught at the Erez Crossing, carrying explosives and a detonator in her underwear. She planned to carry out a suicide bombing attack in the Soroka hospital where she received medical treatment and was scheduled for a doctors appointment. The woman was identified as Wafa Samir Ibrahim Bass and said she was sent by the Al-Aqsa Martyrs' Brigades.
- July 12 – 2nd HaSharon Mall entrance suicide bombing: Islamic Jihad takes responsibility for a suicide bombing in Netanya, which kills five Israelis at a shopping mall.
- August 28 – Central Bus Station Beer Sheva bombing: A Palestinian Islamic Jihad suicide bomber kills himself and wounds nearly 50 people in the southern Israeli city of Beersheba near the main bus terminal. According to sources, the bomber was trying to make his way to Beersheba's Soroka Hospital.
- October 26 – Hadera Market bombing: A Palestinian Arab suicide bomber carries out an attack in Hadera, which kills six Israelis and injures twenty-six. Islamic Jihad claims responsibility for the attack.
- December 5 – 3rd HaSharon Mall entrance suicide bombing: A Palestinian Arab suicide bomber carries out an attack in Netanya, which kills five Israelis.
- December 29 – Tulkarem roadblock bombing: A suicide bomber attacks a checkpoint near the West Bank city of Tulkarm, killing one Israeli soldier, two Palestinian Arab civilians and himself. Islamic Jihad claims responsibility for the attack.

==== Notable Israeli military operations against Palestinian militancy targets ====
The most prominent Israeli military counter-terrorism operations (military campaigns and military operations) carried out against Palestinian militants during 2005 include:

- December 28 – Israeli jets bomb the PFLP-GC base in Naameh, Lebanon, a few miles outside Beirut, wounding two people, in retaliation for a rocket attack that hit Qiryat Shemona.

== Notable deaths ==
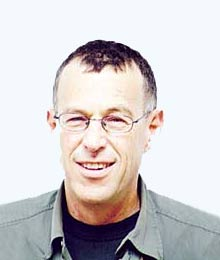
Dudu Geva

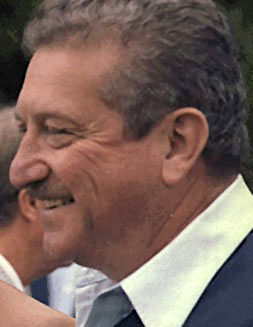
Ezer Weizman

- January 29 – Ephraim Kishon (born 1924), Hungarian-born Israeli satirist, dramatist, screenwriter and film director, apparent heart attack.
- January 30 – Asher Peres (born 1934), French-born Israeli physicist, considered a pioneer in quantum information theory.
- February 15 – Dudu Geva (born 1950), Israeli cartoonist.
- March 1 – Peter Malkin (born 1927), German-born Israeli Mossad agent, the man who captured Adolf Eichmann.
- March 18 – Gary Bertini (born 1927), Romanian (Bessarabia)-born Israeli musician and conductor.
- April 12 – Ehud Manor (born 1941), Israeli songwriter.
- April 24 – Ezer Weizman (born 1924), former Israeli president.
- May 19 – Batya Gur (born 1947), Israeli author.
- May 28 – Avner Shaki (born 1926), Israeli politician.
- August 21 – Dahlia Ravikovitch (born 1936), Israeli poet and author.
- September 10 – Lea Nikel (born 1918), Russian (Ukraine)-born Israeli abstract artist.
- October 3 – Sarah Levy-Tanai (born 1910), Israeli choreographer.
- October 15 – Efraim Reuytenberg (born 1914), Israeli painter, known for use of Chinese motifs.
- November 13 – Miriam Roth (born 1910), Czech-born Israeli children's author.
- December 11 – Professor Hayim Tadmor (born 1923), Chinese-born Israeli Assyriologist.

== See also ==
- 2005 in Israeli film
- 2005 in Israeli television
- 2005 in Israeli music
- 2005 in Israeli sport
- Israel in the Eurovision Song Contest 2005
- 2005 in the Palestinian territories
