= 2008 in Israel =

- Decades: 1980s; 1990s; 2000s; 2010s; 2020s
- See also: History of Israel; Timeline of Israeli history; List of years in Israel

Events in the year 2008 in Israel.

== Incumbents ==
- President of Israel – Shimon Peres
- Prime Minister of Israel – Ehud Olmert
- President of the Supreme Court – Dorit Beinisch
- Chief of General Staff – Gabi Ashkenazi
- Government of Israel – 31st Government of Israel

== Events ==
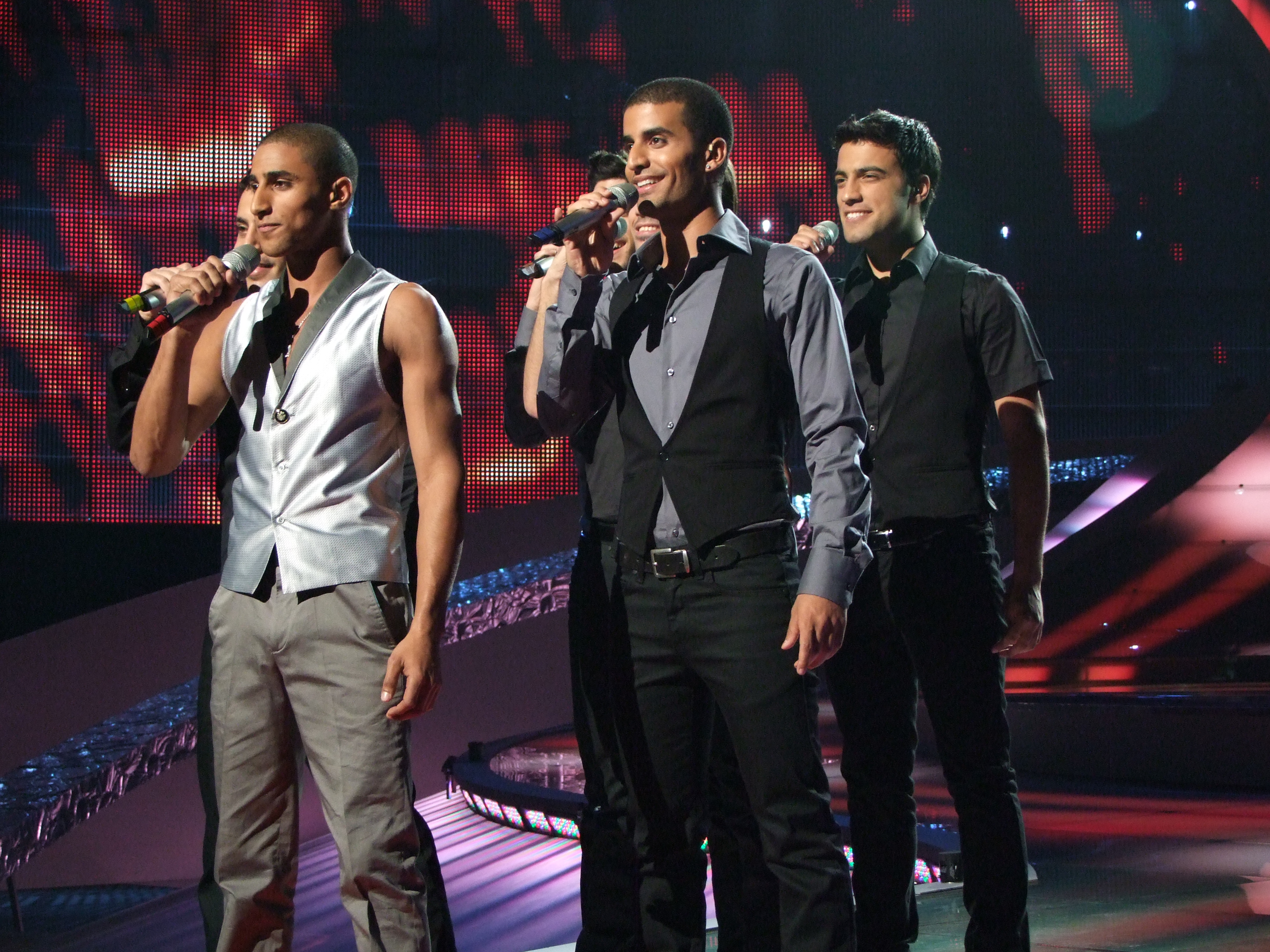
19 May: Boaz Ma'uda performs at the Eurovision Song Contest.

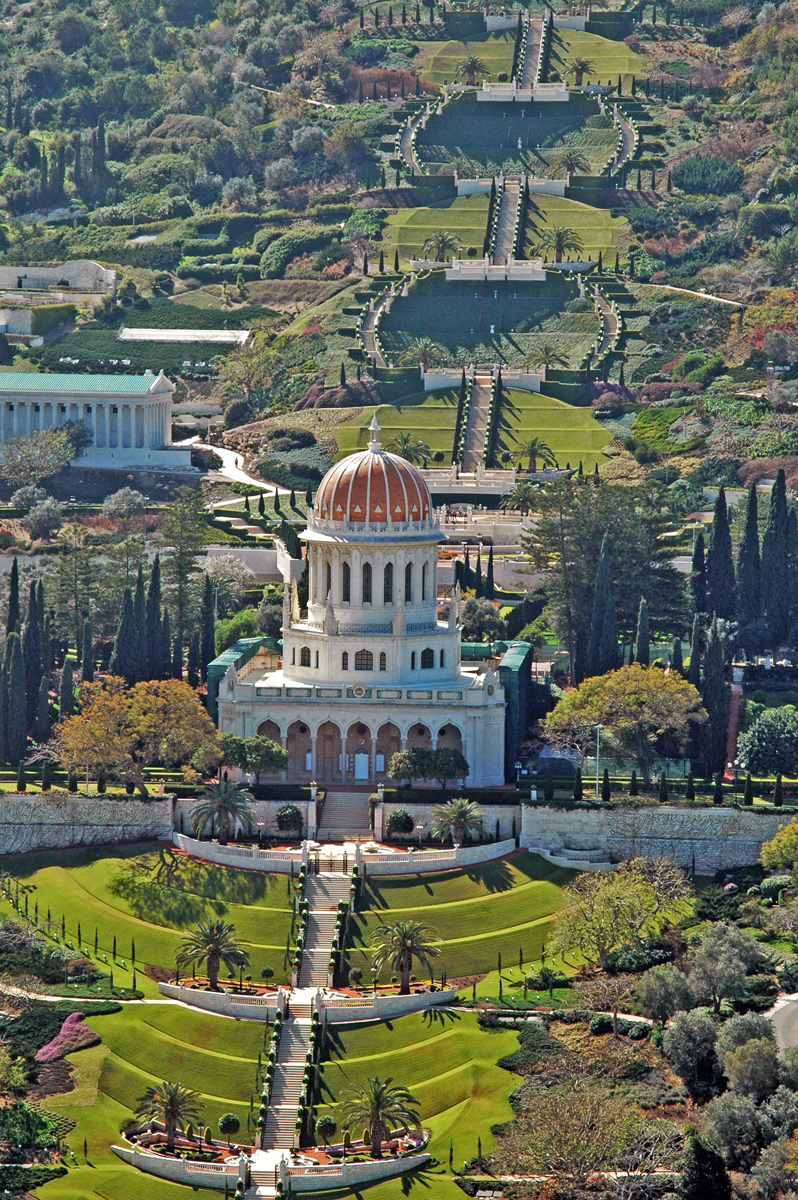
8 July: The Baha'i Holy Places in Haifa and the Western Galilee are designated by UNESCO as World Heritage Sites

- January 21 – The Israeli reconnaissance satellite Ofek-8 is launched.
- January 21 – The senior lecturers' strike at the Israeli universities ends.
- January 30 – The final Winograd Commission report is announced in Binyanei HaUma in Jerusalem.
- April 24 – The United States claims North Korea helped Syria build a nuclear reactor at a site destroyed by Israeli forces in September 2007.
- April 28 – Israeli satellite Amos-3 is launched into space from the Baikonur Cosmodrome space launch facility in Kazakhstan.
- May 4 – Former Finance Minister Avraham Hirschson is indicted with a string of crimes including breach of trust, aggravated fraud, theft, forgery of corporate documents and money laundering.
- May 12 – Israeli police raid the Jerusalem city hall to seize documents related to alleged bribes received by Prime Minister Ehud Olmert from businessman Moshe Talansky.
- 24 May – Boaz Ma'uda represents Israel at the Eurovision Song Contest with the song “HaEsh BaEinayikh” ("The Fire in Your Eyes "), achieving 9th place.
- July 8 – Baha'i Holy Places in Haifa and Western Galilee are designated by UNESCO as World Heritage Sites.
- July 16 – Hezbollah swaps the bodies of the Israeli soldiers Ehud Goldwasser and Eldad Regev in exchange for the Lebanese Druze terrorist, Samir Kuntar, four Hezbollah prisoners captured during the 2006 Lebanon war and the bodies of 199 Palestinian Arab and Lebanese fighters.
- July 30 – Prime Minister Ehud Olmert announces that he would not seek re-election as party leader and that he would resign from his position as Prime Minister immediately after a new Kadima leader was named. One reason for resignation is the corruption scandal in which Olmert is embattled.
- September 17 – Foreign Minister of Israel Tzipi Livni is selected as the new leader of the Kadima party, putting her in position to possibly become the first female Prime Minister of Israel since Golda Meir.
- September 21 – Israeli Prime Minister Ehud Olmert officially submits his resignation to President Shimon Peres. Foreign Minister Tzipi Livni begins talks on forming a new government.
- December 16 – 24 Russian tourists are killed when their bus plummets into a ravine near Eilat in southern Israel, making this road accident the deadliest in the state's history.
- December 27 – Population Census: 7,465,500 inhabitants in Israel. 75.5% of them are registered as Jewish (about 5,634,300 people), 20.3% of them are registered as Arabs (about 1,513,200 people), while the remaining 4.2% (about 318,000 people) are registered as "others".

=== Israeli–Palestinian conflict ===
The most prominent events related to the Israeli–Palestinian conflict which occurred during 2008 include:

- August 25 – Israel releases 199 Palestinian Arab prisoners as a goodwill gesture to the Chairman of the Palestinian National Authority, Mahmoud Abbas, as the United States Secretary of State, Condoleezza Rice, visits the area.

Notable Palestinian militant operations against Israeli targets

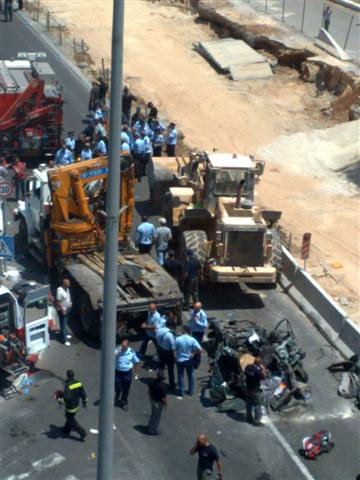
The site of when an east Jerusalem Palestinian Arab resident used a construction loader to perpetrate the Jerusalem bulldozer attack on July 2, 2008

The most prominent Palestinian militant acts and operations committed against Israeli targets during 2008 include:

- January 24 – Two Palestinian Arabs infiltrate a religious seminary and stab three students in the West Bank settlement of Kfar Etzion before being shot dead.
- January 24 – Palestinian Arab gunmen open fire on Israelis outside the Shuafat refugee camp on the outskirts of Jerusalem, killing a border police officer and seriously wounding a female officer.
- February 4 – 2008 Dimona suicide bombing: A suicide attack carried out by Hamas at a shopping centre in Dimona, Israel. One Israeli elderly woman is killed in the attack while nine other people are wounded (one of them critically). Hamas claims responsibility for the attack.
- February 27 – Over 46 Qassam rockets are fired by Palestinian Arab militants into the Western Negev and Israel's Southern Mediterranean coast, many of them hit the city of Ashkelon and the town of Sderot, among other Israeli towns and villages in the area. One of the rockets that lands in a parking lot at the Sapir Academic College killing 47-year-old Israeli student, Ronni Yechia.
- March 6 – Mercaz HaRav massacre: Eight Israeli civilians are killed and 9 wounded when a Palestinian Arab attacker opens fire at a Jewish seminary in Jerusalem.
- April 19 – Kerem Shalom suicide bombing: Three Palestinian Arab car suicide bombers used two jeeps and an APC to break through the border fence to attack the Kerem Shalom IDF post, blowing themselves up and wounding several Israeli soldiers. Hamas claims responsibility.
- May 14 – A Katyusha rocket is fired at the Israeli city of Ashqelon striking a clinic on the third floor of the Huzot shopping mall, serious wounding three people, moderately wounding two and with eleven other people suffering minor wounds. The Popular Front for the Liberation of Palestine claims responsibility.
- June 6 – An Israeli man is killed and four other people are wounded when Hamas militants in the Gaza Strip fire a mortar shell at kibbutz Nirim in the western Negev desert.
- July 2 – Jerusalem bulldozer attack: A Palestinian Arab resident of east Jerusalem attacks several cars on the Jaffa Road in Jerusalem using a front-end loader (erroneously referred to as a bulldozer in the media), killing three people and wounding at least 30 other pedestrians, before being shot to death.
- September 22 – Jerusalem BMW attack: At least 19 people are wounded when a Palestinian Arab drives his car into a crowd of IDF soldiers at a busy intersection in Jerusalem. The driver is shot and killed at the scene by an Israeli soldier.

Notable Israeli military operations against Palestinian militancy targets

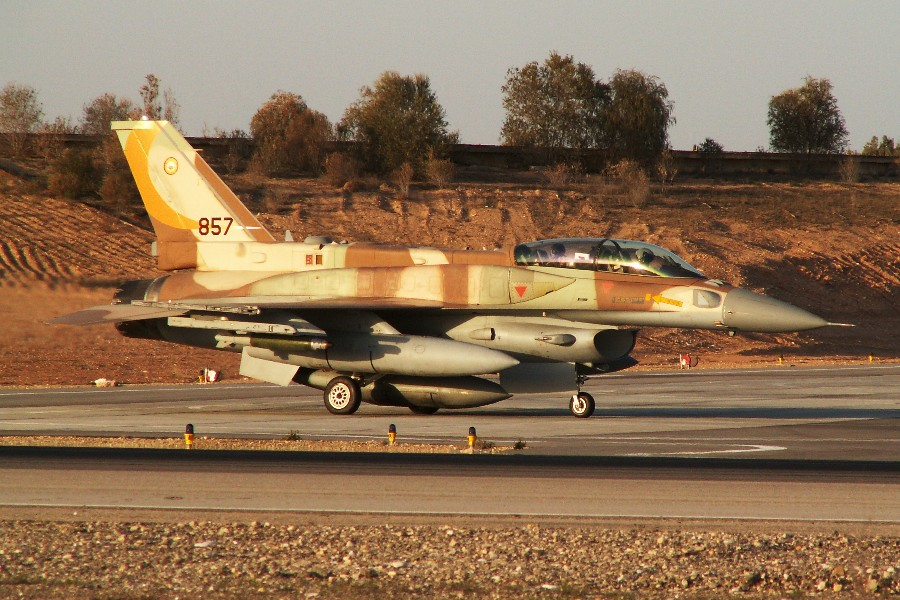
Israeli F-16i of the 107th Squadron preparing for take-off during Operation Cast Lead, December 2008

The most prominent Israeli military counter-terrorism operations (military campaigns and military operations) carried out against Palestinian militants during 2008 include:

- February 5 – Israel launches an attack on Palestinian militant targets in the Gaza Strip, killing eight Hamas members, after Hamas claimed responsibility for the Dimona attack.
- February 28 – March 3 – Operation Hot Winter: Israel Defense Forces military campaign in the Gaza Strip is launched in response to the constant firing of Qassam rockets from the Strip by Hamas militants. 110 Palestinians killed, among them 54 children.
- March 12 – Israeli commandos kill four Palestinian militants in the West Bank including three members of the Islamic Jihad Movement in Palestine.
- December 27, 2008 – January 18, 2009 – Operation Cast Lead: A large-scale three-week IDF military campaign in the Gaza Strip seriously damages the paramilitary infrastructure of Hamas. Israel claims that the strikes are a response to frequent Qassam rocket and mortar fire from the Strip on Israel's southern civilian communities. The conflict resulted in between 1,166 and 1,417 Palestinian and 13 Israeli deaths (4 from friendly fire).

== Notable deaths ==
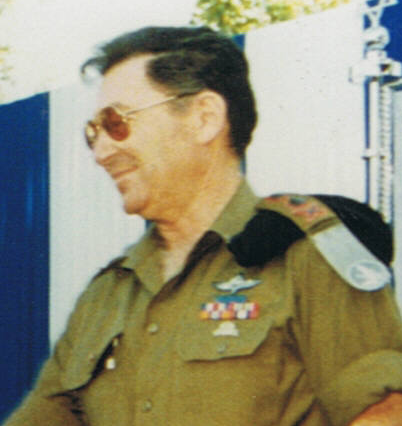
Dan Shomron

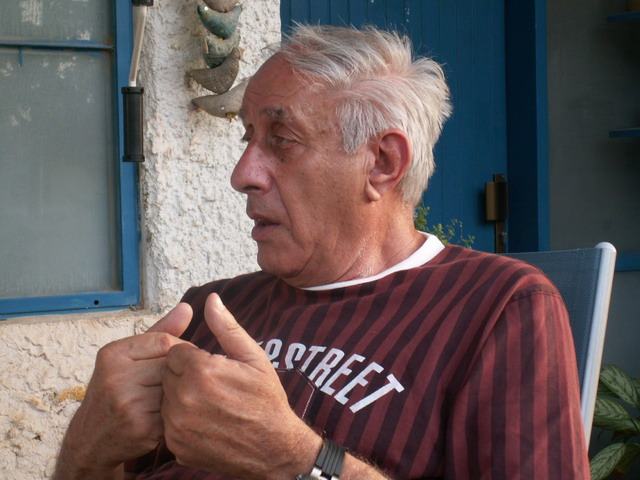
Ralph Klein

- January 8 – Moshe Levi (born 1936), Israeli Chief of Staff of the Israel Defense Forces (1983–1987) – stroke.
- January 18 – Uzi Cohen (born 1952), Israeli Likud politician – heart attack.
- February 26 – Dan Shomron (born 1937), Israeli general, Chief of the Israel Defense Forces (1987–1991) – stroke.
- February 26 – Aharon Amir (born 1923), Russian (Lithuania)-born Israeli author and translator – natural causes.
- April 1 – Mosko Alkalai (born 1931), Romanian-born Israeli actor – respiratory failure.
- April 1 – Shosh Atari (born 1949), Israeli radio presenter and actress – heart attack.
- April 20 – Nissan Nativ (born 1922), Dutch-born Israeli director, actor and acting teacher.
- April 26 – Yossi Harel (born 1918), Israeli Haganah member, a commander of many illegal immigrants ships headed towards Palestine during the Mandate period, including the ship SS Exodus – cardiac arrest.
- May 9 – Shmuel Katz (born 1914), South African-born Israeli writer, historian and journalist.
- May 24 – Adam Baruch (born 1945), Israeli journalist, writer and art critic – diabetes complications.
- June 1 – Tommy Lapid (born 1931), Yugoslav (Vojvodina, Serbia)-born Israeli journalist and politician, deputy prime minister (2003–2004) – cancer.
- August 7 – Ralph Klein (born 1931), German-born Israeli basketball player and coach – intestinal cancer.
- August 19 – Binyamin Gibli (born 1919), Israeli head of military intelligence.
- August 25 – Josef Tal (born 1910), German-born Israeli composer – natural causes.
- August 27 – Abie Nathan (born 1927), Iranian-born Israeli peace activist, founder of Voice of Peace radio station.
- September 1 – Oded Schramm (born 1961), Israeli mathematician – fall.
- September 16 – Avraham Biran (born 1909), Israeli archaeologist – natural causes.
- October 27 – Zvi Keren (born 1917), American-born Israeli pianist, musicologist and composer.
- November 17 – Yaakov Alperon (born 1955), Israeli organized crime mobster – car bomb.
- November 27 – Gideon Gechtman (born 1942), Egyptian-born Israeli artist – heart failure.

== See also ==
- 2008 in Israeli film
- 2008 in Israeli television
- 2008 in Israeli music
- 2008 in Israeli sport
- Israel in the Eurovision Song Contest 2008
- Israel at the 2008 Summer Olympics
- 2008 in the Palestinian territories
