= 2007 in Palestine =

- Decades: 1980s; 1990s; 2000s; 2010s; 2020s
- See also: History of Palestine · Timeline of Palestinian history · List of years in Palestine

Events in the year 2007 in Palestine.

== Incumbents ==
- President – Mahmoud Abbas (PLO)
- Prime Minister – Ismail Haniyeh (Hamas) until 14 June
  - Prime Minister of the Palestinian National Authority (in the West Bank) – Salam Fayyad (Third Way)
  - Prime Minister of the Palestinian National Authority (in the Gaza Strip) – Ismail Haniyeh (Hamas) (in rebellion against the Palestinian National Authority.)
- Government of Palestine – 10th Government of Palestine (until 17 March), 11th Government of Palestine (from 17 March to 14 June), 12th Government of Palestine (starting 14 June)

== Events ==
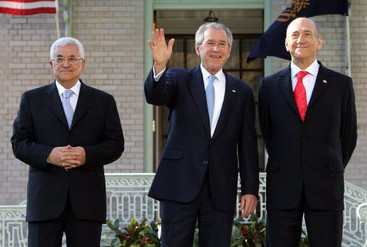
The Palestinian National Authority participates in the Annapolis Conference, November 27, 2007

- January 19 – Israel releases $100 million in frozen assets to President of the Palestinian National Authority Mahmoud Abbas of the Palestinian National Authority, in order to bolster Abbas's position and keep money out of the hands of the Hamas government.
- January 29 – Eilat bakery bombing: A Palestinian Arab suicide bomber from the Gaza Strip infiltrates the northern suburbs of Eilat, Israel. Upon seeing the police approaching, he ducks into a neighbourhood bakery and detonates his bomb, killing the three men employed there – all Israeli Jews.
- May 2 – Hamas and Islamic Jihad launch at least 18 rockets into Israel, damaging a road, hitting a car in a commercial center of Sderot, killing an Israeli woman and lightly wounding 2 others.
- May 21 – A man is killed in Sderot after a rocket landed near the car in which he was sitting.
- June 7 – 15 – Battle of Gaza: Hamas takes control of the entire Gaza Strip after numerous gun battles, and establishes a separate government while Fatah remains in control of the West Bank. This in practice divides the area administered by the Palestinian Authority into two. President Mahmoud Abbas and the more moderate Fatah party advocate a Palestinian Arab state alongside Israel, while Prime Minister Ismail Haniyeh and the Islamist Hamas party reject Israel's right to exist.
- June 14 – President of the Palestinian Authority Mahmoud Abbas dismisses Ismail Haniyeh as Prime Minister of the Palestinian National Authority and appoints Salam Fayyad in his place. The legality of this move is disputed by Hamas, which continues to recognise Haniyeh as prime minister, and Haniyeh continues to exercise prime ministerial authority in the Gaza Strip.
- June 25 – Prime Minister of Israel Ehud Olmert meets with Middle East leaders President of Egypt Hosni Mubarak, President of the Palestinian Authority Mahmoud Abbas and King Abdullah II of Jordan in a summit in Sharm el-Sheikh aimed at boosting Abbas' leadership of the Palestinian Authority and isolating Hamas after their takeover of Gaza. Olmert announces that he will release 250 Palestinian political prisoners as a gesture of goodwill.
- July 20 – Israel has begun releasing 250 Palestinian Arab prisoners associated with Fatah as a goodwill gesture to the President of the Palestinian National Authority, Mahmoud Abbas.
- August 6 – Israeli Prime Minister Ehud Olmert arrives in the historic town of Jericho, administered by the Palestinian Authority, becoming the first Prime Minister of Israel to visit the West Bank or Gaza Strip in more than seven years. Olmert meets with Mahmoud Abbas, President of the Palestinian National Authority.
- November 19 – Israel releases 450 Palestinian Arab prisoners as a goodwill gesture to the President of the Palestinian National Authority, Mahmoud Abbas, ahead of the 2007 Mideast peace conference with the Palestinian Authority.
- November 27 – The Annapolis Conference is held in Annapolis, the capital of the US state of Maryland. The conference marks the first time a two-state solution is articulated as the mutually agreed-upon outline for addressing the Israeli–Palestinian conflict. The conference ends with the issuing of a joint statement from all parties.

== Notable deaths ==
- September 25 – Haidar Abdel-Shafi, 88, Palestinian Arab politician, negotiator in the Peace Process, stomach cancer.
- November 24 – Imil Jarjoui, 72, Palestinian Arab politician, member of the Palestinian Legislative Council and the PLO executive committee, heart attack.

== See also ==
- 2007 in Israel
- 2007–present blockade of the Gaza Strip
- 2006–2007 economic sanctions against the Palestinian National Authority
- Palestine at the 2007 Asian Winter Games
- Timeline of the Israeli–Palestinian conflict in 2007
