= 2006 in Palestine =

- Decades: 1980s; 1990s; 2000s; 2010s; 2020s
- See also: History of Palestine · Timeline of Palestinian history · List of years in Palestine

Events in the year 2006 in Palestine.

== Incumbents ==
- President – Mahmoud Abbas
- Prime Minister – Ahmed Qurei (Fatah) until 29 March, Ismail Haniyeh (Hamas) starting 29 March
- Government of Palestine – 9th Government of Palestine (until 29 March), 10th Government of Palestine (starting 29 March)

== Events ==
- January 25 – Palestinian Authority legislative election: Hamas wins the majority of seats in the Palestinian Authority legislative election. Israel, the United States, the European Union, and several European and Western countries cut off their aid to the Palestinian Authority; as they view the Islamist political party who rejects Israel's right to exist as a terrorist organization.
- February 3 – At least three Qassam rockets are fired from Gaza by Palestinian Arab militants at Israeli civilian targets. One rocket strikes a home in Kibbutz Karmia, injuring four people, including a one-year-old infant. The home belongs to a family recently evicted during Israel's 2005 unilateral disengagement from the Gaza Strip.
- March 14 – IDF military operation in a Palestinian Authority prison in Jericho in order to capture several Palestinian Arab prisoners located there who had assassinated the Israeli politician, Rehavam Ze'evi. The operation is conducted as a result of the expressed intentions of the newly elected Hamas government to release these prisoners.
- March 23 – Israeli security sources capture the Hamas military commander in the West Bank, Ibrahim Hamed, who ordered suicide bombing attacks during the Al-Aqsa Intifada, in a Ramallah raid. (BBC)
- March 28 – For the first time, a Katyusha rocket is fired from the Gaza Strip into Israel. (JPost) (BBC) (MSNBC) Katyushas, frequently used by Hezbollah in Lebanon, had never previously been fired from Gaza. Large numbers of Qassam rockets began landing in the Western Negev in March 2006.
- April 17 – Rosh Ha'ir restaurant bombing: A suicide attack carried out by the Palestinian Islamic Jihad together with Al-Aqsa Martyrs' Brigades near the Old Tel Aviv Central Bus Station. 11 Israelis are killed in the attack while 68 were wounded.
- May 14 – The IDF kill Elias al-Ashkar, the senior Islamic Jihad commander in the Jenin area who was accused of planning several suicide attacks that killed nearly 30 people. Six other Palestinian Arabs are also killed.,
- May 14 – The Israeli Navy intercepted a Palestinian boat carrying a large amount of explosives near the Gaza Strip in an attempted smuggling operation. The boat contained about 450 kg of TNT and parts of mines.
- June 8 – Israel resumed its policy of the extrajudicial killing of key Hamas leaders, with the IDF assassination of Jamal Abu Samhadana, founder of the Popular Resistance Committees, which regularly launches home-made rockets into Israel. The Israeli military said Samhadana and the other targeted militants were planning an attack on Israel. The policy of targeted killings had ceased with the February 2005 Israeli-PA ceasefire agreement, which Hamas had also pledged to observe. Samhadana had been appointed the Palestinian Interior and National Security Ministry of the PNA's new Hamas-led government on 20 April 2006, a position similar to the ministry's director-general.
- June 8 – In response to Samhadana's assassination, Palestinians in the Gaza Strip fired two rockets into Israel hours after his death, hitting a building in the southern town of Sderot, but causing no casualties.
- June 9 – In response to the rocket fire, the IDF shelled rocket launching sites. At the time of this campaign an explosion occurred on a busy Gaza beach, killing eight Palestinian Arab civilians. Following the blast, an internal Israel Defense Forces (IDF) enquiry is initiated. Israel later stated that "(t)he chances that artillery fire hit that area at that time are nil". Nevertheless, Israel acknowledged that it had been shelling 250m away from the family's location; Palestinians claimed that the explosion was Israeli responsibility. Reports have concluded Israel had not been responsible for the blast.
- June 13 – The IDF kills eleven people in a missile strike on a van carrying Palestinian Arab militants and rockets driving through a densely civilian populated area in Gaza. Nine among those killed are civilian bystanders.

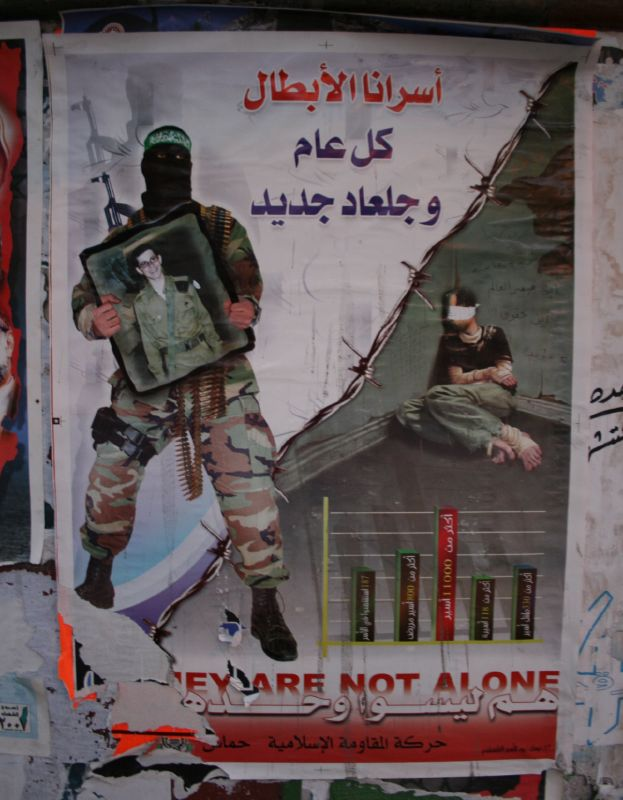
On June 25 IDF soldier Gilad Shalit is captured and abducted by Hamas militants in a cross-border raid.

- June 25 – IDF soldier Gilad Shalit is captured by Hamas in a cross-border raid and is abducted. He has been held as a prisoner in the Gaza Strip by Hamas since then.
- June 25 – The Palestinian Arab militant group PRC kidnaps and an hour later kills a 19-year-old Israeli tertiary student, Eliyahu Asheri.
- June 28 – November 26 – Israel launches an offensive against militants in Gaza in response to the killing of two soldiers and the kidnapping of the Israeli soldier Corporal Gilad Shalit on June 25, 2006, and the firing of Qassam rockets toward Israel.
- June 29 – Israeli soldiers arrest 62 Hamas members in the West Bank, including 8 ministers and 20 lawmakers in the Palestinian Authority. Israeli officials announce that the suspects will face standard criminal proceedings.
- July 5 – First Qassam rocket of increased strength is fired into the school yard in the Southern Israeli coastal city of Ashkelon. This has been the first instance of an increased distance Qassam rockets can reach and the first time a significantly large city has been attacked. No one was injured in this attack.
- November 4 – Israel Defense Forces mount a series of air strikes as part of an ongoing Gaza offensive, killing at least eight.(BBC NEWS),
- November 8 – 2006 shelling of Beit Hanoun: An incident in which the Israel Defense Forces' shells hit a row of houses in the Gaza Strip town of Beit Hanoun, killing 19 Palestinian Arabs and wounding more than 40. Israel apologized and attributed the incident to a technical malfunction.

== Notable deaths ==
- May 24, – Nabil Hodhod, Palestinian security chief, killed by car bomb.
- May 26, – Mahmoud al-Majzoub, c.41, also known as Abu Hamza, Palestinian Islamic Jihad leader, assassination by bombing.
- July 29, – Hani Awijan, 29, leader of Palestinian Islamic Jihad's military wing, The Al-Quds brigades, in Nablus, West Bank, killed by gunfire.

== See also ==
- 2006 in Israel
- 2006–2007 economic sanctions against the Palestinian National Authority
