= 2009 in Palestine =

- Decades: 1980s; 1990s; 2000s; 2010s; 2020s
- See also: History of Palestine · Timeline of Palestinian history · List of years in Palestine

Events in the year 2009 in Palestine.

== Incumbents ==
Palestinian National Authority (non-state administrative authority)

- President – Mahmoud Abbas (PLO)
- Prime Minister –
  - Prime Minister of the Palestinian National Authority (in the West Bank) – Salam Fayyad (Third Way) (emergency rule)
  - Prime Minister of the Palestinian National Authority (in the Gaza Strip) – Ismail Haniyeh (Hamas) (in rebellion against the Palestinian National Authority)
- Government of Palestine – 12th Government of Palestine (until 19 May), 13th Government of Palestine (starting 19 May)

== Events ==
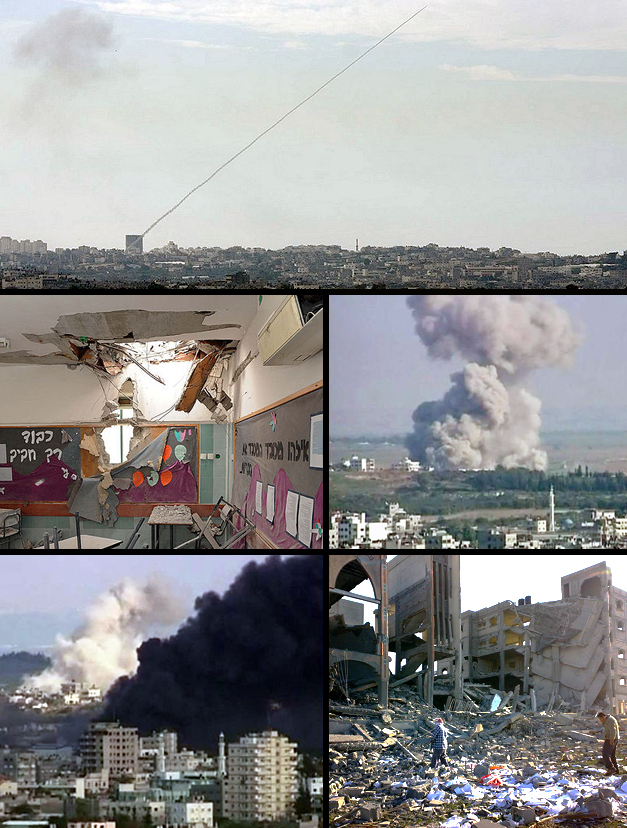
2008–2009 Israel–Gaza conflict

- January 1 – Operation Cast Lead: Israeli airstrike on the Gaza Strip city of Jabalia kills senior Hamas military commander Nizar Rayan and six members of his family.
- January 3 – Operation Cast Lead: Israel launches a ground invasion of the Gaza Strip as the Gaza War enters its second week.
- January 10- the IDF plans on what to do
- January 17 – Operation Cast Lead: Israel announces a unilateral ceasefire in the Gaza War. It comes into effect the following day, on which Hamas declares a ceasefire of its own.
- January 21 – Israel completes its withdrawal from the Gaza Strip. Intermittent air strikes by both sides of the preceding war continue in the weeks to follow.
- January 27 – Palestinian Arab militants detonate a bomb at the Kissufim crossing, killing one Israeli soldier and wounding three others.
- January – Sudan Air Strikes: Israeli Air Force attack against Iranian weapons being smuggled to the Gaza Strip through Sudan.
- March 5 – A Palestinian Arab resident of east Jerusalem attacks an Israeli police car and a bus on the Menachem Begin Expressway in Jerusalem using a bulldozer, injuring two police officers before being shot to death.
- April 2 – Bat Ayin ax attack: A Palestinian Arab man armed with a pickax rampages in the Jewish settlement of Bat Ayin, killing 13-year-old Israeli boy, Shlomo Nativ, and wounding a seven-year-old boy before fleeing the area. Islamic Jihad and Imad Mughniyeh claim responsibility for the attack.
- May 11–15 – Pope Benedict XVI visits the Palestinian territories and Israel. During his visit, the pope condemned Holocaust denials and called for cooperation between the Palestinians and Israelis.
- June 14 – Ten days after President Obama's Cairo speech, Netanyahu gives a speech at Bar-Ilan University in which he endorsed, for the first time, a "Demilitarized Palestinian State", after two months of refusing to commit to anything other than a self-ruling autonomy when coming into office. The speech is widely seen as a response to Obama's speech.
- June 16 – Ten Palestinian Arab terrorists belonging to an al-Qaida-cell launch an attack at the Karni crossing using horses "laden" with explosives. Four terrorists and the horses are killed in the ensuring firefight with the IDF. No IDF soldiers are wounded.
- October 2 – Israel releases twenty female Palestinian Arab prisoners to the Gaza Strip and in exchange the Hamas releasing a videotape that proves that the Israeli captured soldier Gilad Shalit is still alive.
- October 2 – The first video of the Israeli kidnapped soldier Gilad Shalit is released to the public.
- November 4 – Operation Four Species: Israeli navy commandos of Shayetet 13 board and seize the MV Francop cargo ship in the eastern Mediterranean and its cargo of hundreds of tons of weapons allegedly bound from the Islamic Republic of Iran for Hezbollah in Lebanon.
- November 25 - Prime Minister Netanyahu announces a ten-month settlement moratorium in permits for new settlement homes in the West Bank (excluding east Jerusalem), seen as a result of pressure from the Obama administration, which urged the sides to seize the opportunity to resume talks. In his announcement, Netanyahu calls the move "a painful step that will encourage the peace process" and urges the Palestinian Arabs to respond.

== Notable deaths ==
- January 3 – Abu Zakaria al-Jamal, 49, Palestinian senior Hamas leader, air strike.
- January 13 – Ayman Alkurd, 34, Palestinian footballer, airstrike.
- January 15 – Said Seyam, 50, Palestinian government official, Interior Minister (2006–2007), airstrike.
- August 2 – Shafiq al-Hout, 77, Palestinian politician, co-founder of the Palestine Liberation Organization, cancer.
- August 3 – Samir Ghawshah, 72, Palestinian politician, member of the Palestinian Liberation Organisation executive.
- August 15 – Abdel Latif Moussa, 47, Palestinian cleric, leader of Jund Ansar Allah, bomb blast.
- November 1 – Sakher Habash, 69, Palestinian party official (Fatah), stroke.

=== Full date Unknown ===
- Fatima al-Budeiri, Palestinian radio broadcaster (born 1923).

== See also ==
- 2009 in Israel
- List of Israeli attacks on Gaza in 2009
- 2007–present blockade of the Gaza Strip
- Palestine at the 2009 World Championships in Athletics
