= 2005 in Palestine =

- Decades: 1980s; 1990s; 2000s; 2010s; 2020s
- See also: History of Palestine · Timeline of Palestinian history · List of years in Palestine

Events in the year 2005 in Palestine.

== Incumbents ==
- President of Palestine – Rawhi Fattouh (Fatah) interim until January 15, Mahmoud Abbas (Fatah) informally acting from January 15 to May 8 and formally acting since May 8
- President of the Palestinian National Authority – Rawhi Fattouh (Fatah) interim until January 15, Mahmoud Abbas (Fatah) since January 15
- Prime Minister of the Palestinian National Authority – Ahmed Qurei (Fatah) until December 18, Nabil Shaath (Fatah) interim until December 24, Ahmed Qurei (Fatah) since December 24
- Government of Palestine – 8th Government of Palestine (until 24 February), 9th Government of Palestine (starting 24 February)

== Events ==
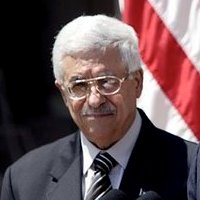
Mahmoud Abbas is elected as the president of the Palestinian Authority

=== January ===
- January 9 – 2005 Palestinian presidential election: Mahmoud Abbas defeats Mustafa Barghouti.
- January 10 – Mahmoud Abbas is officially declared winner of the Palestinian presidential election, with 62.3% of the votes cast.
- January 12 – Morag attack: One Israeli civilian is killed and three IDF soldiers are wounded when a bomb is detonated against a military vehicle patrolling the route near Morag. Two terrorists are killed by IDF forces. The area was booby-trapped with explosive devices, in addition to the bomb that exploded. Palestinian Islamic Jihad claims responsibility.
- January 13 – Karni border crossing attack: Palestinian Arab militants explode a truck laden with explosives in the Karni crossing in the eastern Gaza Strip. At least six Israelis are killed, as well as three of the attackers, and about 10–20 are wounded in the attack. The al-Aqsa Martyrs' Brigades, the Popular Resistance Committees and Hamas claim joint responsibility.
- January 15 – 2005 Palestinian presidential inauguration: Mahmoud Abbas is sworn in to office and becomes the 2nd President of the Palestinian National Authority. Abbas also informally takes the role of Acting President of the State of Palestine.
- January 18 – Gush Katif checkpoint attack

=== February ===
- February 8 – The Sharm el-Sheikh Summit: Palestinian President Mahmoud Abbas declares violence will come to an end, and Israeli Prime Minister Ariel Sharon agrees to release 900 Palestinian prisoners and withdraw Israeli forces from areas of the West Bank. This is considered to be the official end of the Second Intifada, although sporadic violence would continue outside Palestinian government control.
- February 16 – The Knesset finalizes and approves Israel's unilateral disengagement plan with 59 in favor, 40 opposed, 5 abstaining.
- February 21 – Israel releases 500 Palestinian Arab prisoners, as a gesture of goodwill to the Palestinian Authority and to its chairman, Mahmoud Abbas. Israel plans to release another 400 Palestinian prisoners within the subsequent three months.
- February 25 – Stage Club bombing: A Palestinian Arab teenage suicide bomber blows himself up at the entrance to the "Stage" Club in Tel Aviv. Five Israelis are killed, and about 50 wounded. Islamic Jihad claims responsibility.
- February 28 – Israeli security forces intercept a car bomb in the Arrabah village near Jenin. The 200 kg explosive device, believed to have been the work of Palestinian Islamic Jihad, is later defused by IDF sappers.

=== March ===
- March 16 – Israel formally hands over Jericho to Palestinian Authority control, which is likely to strengthen Mahmoud Abbas.
- March 22 – Israel hands over control of Tulkarm to the Palestinian Authority.

=== May ===
- May 8 – The PLO Executive Committee appoints Palestinian Authority President Mahmoud Abbas as Acting President of the State of Palestine, until the PLO Central Council is convened, so Abbas may also have the formal title for head of state. Abbas had informally been the acting president of the State of Palestine before being formally appointed as acting president.

=== June ===
- June 2 – Israel released 398 Palestinian Arab prisoners, the final phase of an Israeli pledge to release 900 prisoners as a goodwill gesture towards Palestinian Arab leader Mahmoud Abbas.
- June 20 – A Palestinian Arab female suicide bomber is caught at the Erez Crossing, carrying explosives and a detonator in her underwear. She planned to carry out a suicide bombing attack in the Soroka hospital where she received medical treatment and was scheduled for a doctor's appointment. The woman was identified as Wafa Samir Ibrahim Bass and said she was sent by the Al-Aqsa Martyrs' Brigades.

=== July ===
- July 12 – Kenyon HaSharon bombing: Islamic Jihad takes responsibility for a suicide bombing in Netanya, which kills five Israelis at a shopping mall.

=== August ===
- August 15 – The beginning of the implementation of the disengagement plan from Gush Katif in the Gaza Strip.
- August 17 – Israel's unilateral disengagement: The first forced evacuation of Jewish settlers, as part of the disengagement, commenced under Maj. Gen. Dan Harel of the Southern Command's orders. About 14,000 Israeli soldiers and police prepared to forcibly evict settlers and "mistanenim" (infiltrators). There are scenes of troops dragging screaming settlers from houses and synagogues, but with less violence than expected.
- August 17 – An Israeli settler kills three Palestinian Arab civilians in the West Bank. The attack is condemned by Ariel Sharon as a "Jewish Terror act" and "twisted thinking" while Hamas claimed the right to avenge the deaths.
- August 23 – Israel's unilateral disengagement: The evacuation of 25 Jewish settlements in the Gaza Strip and West Bank is accomplished.
- August 28 – Central Bus Station Beer Sheva bombing: A Palestinian Islamic Jihad suicide bomber kills himself and wounds nearly 50 people in the southern Israeli city of Beersheba near the main bus terminal. According to sources, the bomber was trying to make his way to Beersheba's Soroka Hospital.

=== September ===
- September 12 – Israel withdraws the last of its troops from the Gaza Strip, effectively completing its unilateral disengagement plan.

=== October ===
- October 26 – Hadera Market bombing: A Palestinian Arab suicide bomber carries out an attack in Hadera, which kills six Israelis and injures twenty-six. Islamic Jihad claims responsibility for the attack.

=== December ===
- December 5 – Netanya bombing: A Palestinian suicide bomber carries out an attack in Netanya, which kills five Israelis.
- December 29 – Tulkarem roadblock bombing: A suicide bomber attacks a checkpoint near the West Bank city of Tulkarm, killing one Israeli soldier, two Palestinian Arab civilians and himself. Islamic Jihad claims responsibility for the attack.

== Deaths ==
- 13 January – Hisham Sharabi, academic. (b. 1927)
- 16 June – Salem Hanna Khamis, Palestinian statistician and UN official. (b.1919)

== See also ==
- 2005 in Israel
