= 2004 in Palestine =

- Decades: 1980s; 1990s; 2000s; 2010s; 2020s
- See also: History of Palestine · Timeline of Palestinian history · List of years in Palestine

Events in the year 2004 in Palestine.

== Incumbents ==
Palestinian National Authority (non-state administrative authority)

- President – Yasser Arafat (Fatah) until November 11, Rawhi Fattouh (Interim-President of the PA) starting 11 November
- Prime Minister – Ahmed Qurei (Fatah)
- Government of Palestine – 8th Government of Palestine

== Events ==
=== Israeli–Palestinian conflict ===
The most prominent events related to the Israeli–Palestinian conflict which occurred during 2004 include:

- January 12 – Over 100,000 people rally in Tel Aviv to protest Prime Minister Ariel Sharon's plans to withdraw from the Gaza Strip and parts of the West Bank.
- January 26 – Top Hamas official Abdel-Aziz al-Rantissi offers a ten-year truce if Israel would withdraw from territory occupied since 1967 and acknowledge the creation of an Arab state. Israel dismisses the truce offer as "ridiculous".
- January 30 – Sheik Ahmed Yassin, leader of Hamas, announces that his group is making an all-out effort to kidnap Israeli soldiers to use as bargaining chips for Palestinian Arabs in Israeli prisons, following the recent prisoner exchange between Israel and Hezbollah in which the remains of three Israeli soldiers and a businessman were exchanged for over 400 prisoners on January 29, 2004.
- February 2 – Prime Minister of Israel Ariel Sharon announces to the Ha'aretz newspaper that he plans to dismantle 17 Israeli settlements in the Gaza Strip and says that he foresees a time when there are no Jews in Gaza at all.
- May 2 – Members of Israel's Likud Party vote on whether or not to approve Ariel Sharon's proposal to pull out of the Gaza Strip unilaterally. Rejection of the proposal is seen as a major blow to the Sharon government. Sharon subsequently says that he will not resign and may modify the plan.
- June 30 – The Israeli Supreme Court issues a landmark ruling that a 30-kilometer planned stretch of the separation barrier in eastern Jerusalem violates the legal rights of the local Palestinian Arab population to an extent not justified by security concerns, and therefore must be changed.
- July 21 – The United Nations General Assembly passes a resolution demanding that Israel obey the International Court of Justice ruling that the West Bank barrier should be dismantled. Israel condemns the resolution and announces that it will not stop building the barrier.
- July 25 – Over 100,000 opponents of Israel's unilateral disengagement plan of 2004 participate in a human chain from Gush Katif, to the Western Wall, Jerusalem (90 kilometers).
- September 12 – 40,000 demonstrators protest in Jerusalem against Prime Minister Ariel Sharon's plans to force all Israeli Jews to leave the Gaza Strip and parts of the West Bank.
- October 5 – Second Intifada: The United States vetoes a United Nations resolution urging Israel to halt its current offensive in the Gaza Strip. Over 70 Palestinian Arabs, including civilians, have died in the offensive.
- October 6 – Second Intifada: Three Palestinian Arabs, including a 15-year-old boy, are killed after Israel shells the town of Beit Lahiya.
- October 14 – About 100,000 Israelis in 100 cities march in a series of demonstrations across Israel opposing their government's proposal to withdraw Israeli settlers from the Gaza Strip and parts of the West Bank.
- October 16 – Second Intifada: Israeli forces withdraw from the northern Gaza Strip, ending Operation Days of Penitence.
- October 26 – The Knesset approves Israeli Prime Minister Ariel Sharon's plan to withdraw 21 settlements from the Gaza Strip and four from the West Bank by the following year. Israeli Finance Minister Benjamin Netanyahu and three other cabinet ministers from Sharon's ruling Likud government threaten to resign if a referendum over the plan will not be held.

Notable Palestinian militant operations against Israeli targets

The most prominent Palestinian militant acts and operations committed against Israeli targets during 2004 include:

- January 14 – Erez Crossing bombing: A female Palestinian Arab suicide bomber, kills two Israeli soldiers, a border policeman, and a security guard for a private manpower company and wounds twelve others at the Erez Crossing. Hamas and the Al-Aqsa Martyrs' Brigades jointly claim responsibility. Hamas states it used a woman suicide bomber for the first time in order to counter Israeli precautions.
- January 29 – 2004 Jerusalem bus 19 bombing: A Palestinian Arab suicide bomber blows up a bus in Jerusalem, killing ten bystanders and wounding at least fifty others. The Al-Aqsa Martyrs' Brigades claims responsibility for the attack. Hamas also claims responsibility for the bombing and denounces Al-Aqsa.
- February 22 – Jerusalem bus 14 bombing: A Palestinian Arab suicide bomber blows himself up on a rush hour Egged bus No. 14 in Jerusalem, killing eight Israelis and wounding 60 others. The Al-Aqsa Martyrs' Brigades claim responsibility for the attack.
- March 6 – First Erez Crossing attack
- March 14 – Ashdod Port massacre: Two Palestinian Arab suicide bombers kill ten Israeli civilians when they blow themselves up at the southern port of Ashdod. Hamas and the Al-Aqsa Martyrs' Brigades claim joint responsibility for the blasts.
- April 17 – Second Erez Crossing attack: An Israeli border policeman is killed and three other Israelis are wounded in a suicide bombing at the Erez Crossing into the northern Gaza Strip.
- April 26 – Deir al-Balah suicide attack
- April 30 – After failing to bomb his original target, a bus full of Jewish settlers, a Palestinian Arab suicide bomber detonates an explosive device next to an Israeli army patrol, injuring all four soldiers. Hamas claims responsibility.
- May 2 – Palestinian Arab gunmen kill a pregnant Israeli mother, Tali Hatuel, and all four of her young daughters near the Kissufim Crossing into the Gaza Strip. The killers are shot dead by security forces. The incident is believed to have influenced voting intentions in the vote, held the same day, by Likud Party members on whether or not to approve a unilaterally pull out from the Gaza Strip.
- May 22 – Beka'ot checkpoint bombing
- July 11 – Tel Aviv bus stop bombing: An explosive device, packed with ball bearings and bolts, detonates in the bushes behind a bus stop in Tel Aviv, killing one person and injuring thirty-two others.
- August 11 – Kalandia checkpoint attack: Two people are killed and 16 are wounded when an explosive device is detonated by Palestinian militants inside an Arab taxi as it attempts to cross the Kalandia military check point just north of Jerusalem. The Al-Aqsa Martyrs' Brigades faction of Fatah claims responsibility and expresses regret that Arabs are among the dead and wounded.
- August 31 – Beersheba attack: Two buses near the Beersheba municipality building are blown up by a Palestinian Arab suicide bomber. The suicide bomber takes advantage of the fact that the two buses were standing together. He detonates a bomb on one bus and then explodes a second bomb on the second bus. At least fifteen Israelis are killed and around eighty-five injured. The military wing of Hamas claims responsibility for the attack.
- September 1 – Two Palestinian Arab suicide bombers blow themselves up almost simultaneously on two buses in central Beersheba, killing 16 Israelis and wounding dozens.
- September 8 – Baka al-Sharkiyeh checkpoint attack: A car bomb explodes near an Israel Border Police check point in Baqa al-Sharkiya, killing only one of the soldiers. The Fatah's Al-Aqsa Martyrs' Brigades claim responsibility.
- September 14 – Kalandia Gate suicide bombing
- September 22 – French Hill Junction bombing: A Palestinian Arab female suicide bomber detonates her bomb at the French Hill intersection in Jerusalem. Two people are killed and fifteen injured in the attack. The blast is targeted at the large number of civilians at the station at the time of attack. The military wing of al-Fatah claims responsibility for the attack.
- October 6 – Three Hamas militants are killed after infiltrating the Israeli settlement of Kfar Darom. One of the militants blows up when hit by Israeli gunfire, killing a Thai worker in addition to himself. The other two militants are killed by IDF forces.
- October 7 – Sinai bombings: Three bomb attacks are carried out by Palestinian Arab terrorists at holiday resorts in the Sinai Peninsula frequented by Israeli tourists. The attacks kills 34 people and injures 171. Among the dead were twelve Israelis.
- November 1 – Carmel Market bombing: A suicide bombing by a 16-year-old Palestinian Arab boy in a Tel Aviv outdoor market kills three Israelis and wounds over 30 people. The Marxist Popular Front for the Liberation of Palestine claims responsibility.
- November 11 – Three Palestinian Arab militants, members of the Al-Aqsa Martyrs Brigades, are killed by the IDF after infiltrating the Israeli settlement of Netzarim.
- November 21 – Two Palestinian Arab militants are killed by the IDF while attempting to carry out an attack on Kissufim road to Gush Katif
- December 7 – Karni crossing attack
- December 12 – At least five Israeli soldiers are killed and ten are injured as a tunnel rigged with 1,500 kg of explosives explodes near the Rafah crossing between the Gaza Strip and Egypt. Hamas and an al-Aqsa Martyrs' Brigades' offshoot called "Fatah Hawk" claim joint responsibility.
- December 14 – A Thai worker is killed and two more are injured in Gush Katif by mortar shells fired by Palestinian Arabs.

Notable Israeli military operations against Palestinian militancy targets

The most prominent Israeli military counter-terrorism operations (military campaigns and military operations) carried out against Palestinian militants during 2004 include:

- March 22 – Second Intifada: Hamas leader Ahmed Yassin and five of his bodyguards are killed by hellfire missiles fired from an IAF AH-64 Apache helicopter.
- April 17 – Second Intifada: Yassin's successor Abdel Aziz al-Rantissi is killed by hellfire missiles fired from an IAF AH-64 Apache helicopter at his car.
- May 18–23 – Second Intifada: Operation Rainbow - Israel launches a large offensive in the city of Rafah in the Gaza Strip. The IDF's stated aim was to clear terrorist infrastructure, to find smuggling tunnels connecting the Gaza Strip to Egypt, and to kill militants after the deaths of 13 Israeli soldiers in guerrilla attacks.
- September 7 – Second Intifada: An Israeli attack on a Hamas training camp kills 14 members of the military wing of Hamas.
- September 30-October 16 – Second Intifada: Operation Days of Penitence - Israel carries out a 17-day military operation in the northern Gaza Strip. The operation, focused on the town of Beit Hanoun and Beit Lahia and Jabalia refugee camp, which were used as launching sites of Qassam rockets on the Israeli town of Sderot and Israeli settlements in the Gaza Strip, and in particular in response to the death of two children in Sderot. The operation results in the deaths of between 104 and 133 Palestinian Arabs (42 civilians), and five people on the Israeli side (two soldiers and three civilians).
- November 21 – Three Fatah militants are killed in a gunfight with YAMAM, an Israeli Police counterterrorist unit. One Israeli police officer sustained light injuries.

== Notable deaths ==
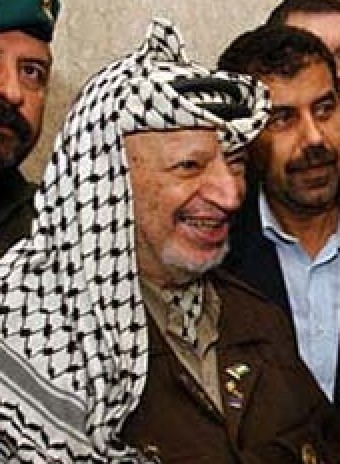
Yasser Arafat

- March 22 - Ahmed Yassin, 66, co-founder and leader of Hamas.
- April 17 - Abdel Aziz al-Rantissi, 56, co-founder of Hamas.
- November 11 - Yasser Arafat, 75, first President of the Palestinian National Authority, Chairman of the Palestine Liberation Organization, and founder and leader of Fatah.

== See also ==
- 2004 in Israel
