= 2004 in Israel =

- Decades: 1980s; 1990s; 2000s; 2010s; 2020s
- See also: History of Israel; Timeline of Israeli history; List of years in Israel

Events in the year 2004 in Israel.

== Incumbents ==
- President of Israel – Moshe Katsav
- Prime Minister of Israel – Ariel Sharon
- President of the Supreme Court – Aharon Barak
- Chief of General Staff – Moshe Ya'alon to June 1 Dan Halutz
- Government of Israel – 30th Government of Israel

== Events ==
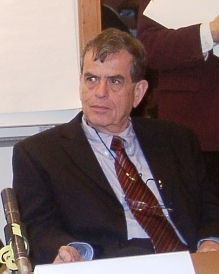
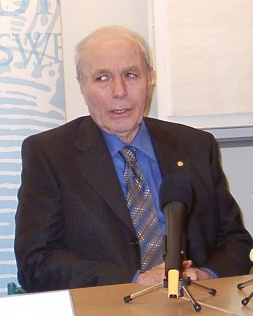
Israeli scientists Aaron Ciechanover and Avram Hershko are awarded the 2004 Nobel Prize in Chemistry
- January 29 – 400 Palestinian Arab prisoners, 30 Lebanese and other Arab prisoners, and the remains of 59 Lebanese militants and civilians are transferred to Hezbollah, together with maps showing Israeli mines in South Lebanon, in exchange for the bodies of the three dead IDF soldiers, Benny Avraham, Adi Avitan and Omar Suaad, as well as the abducted Israeli citizen Elchanan Tenenbaum, who had been captured by Hezbollah after being lured to Dubai for a drug deal.
- April 21 – Mordechai Vanunu, who revealed an alleged Israeli nuclear weapons program in the 1980s, is released from prison in Israel after serving 18 years for treason.
- May 12 – The last F-4 Phantom fighters are withdrawn from service with the Israeli Air Force.
- 12 May – David D'Or represents Israel at the Eurovision Song Contest with the song "Leha'amin" ("To Believe"), reaching the semi-final round.
- May 24 – Madonna cancels three concerts in Israel after receiving letters in which her two young children's lives are threatened.
- July 15 – New Zealand imposes diplomatic sanctions on Israel after an incident involving two alleged Mossad agents committing passport fraud.
- July 19 – Israeli Prime Minister Ariel Sharon calls on French Jews to move to Israel immediately in light of the dramatic rise in French antisemitism (510 antisemitic acts or threats in the first six months of 2004, compared to 593 for all of 2003). The French government describes his comments as unacceptable. An Israeli spokesperson later claims that Sharon had been misunderstood.
- July 30 – Three people are killed and eight wounded in three suicide bomber attacks outside the Israeli and U.S. embassies and the Uzbek chief prosecutor's office in Tashkent, Uzbekistan. The Islamist group Hizb ut-Tahrir is blamed by Uzbek President Islam Karimov. Other unnamed sources point to al-Qaeda.

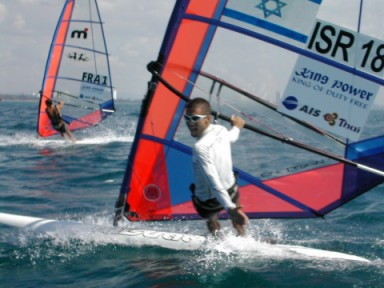
Israeli windsurfer Gal Fridman won a gold medal in the Athens 2004 Summer Olympics, becoming the first (and only, thus far) Olympic gold medalist in Israeli history.

- August – Israeli windsurfer Gal Fridman won a gold medal in the Athens 2004 Summer Olympics, becoming the first (and only, thus far) Olympic gold medalist in Israeli history.
- September 6 – The launch of the Israeli reconnaissance satellite Ofek-6 fails.
- October 7 – Three car bombs are detonated in Egyptian towns in the Sinai Peninsula frequented by Israeli tourists. The largest explosion, which killed at least 34 and wounding 105, was at the Hilton Taba in Taba, near the border with Israel. The other two explosions occurred at the towns of Ras al-Sultan and Nuweiba, killing two Israelis and four Egyptians. A group calling itself Jamayia al-Islamia al-Alamiya ("World Islamist Group") later claims responsibility and threatens further attacks.
- November 6 – The Lebanese militant group, Hezbollah, flies a reconnaissance drone over Israeli territory for the first time.
- November 18 – Three Egyptian paramilitary security officers stationed at the Sinai–Gaza border are killed by Israeli tank fire, after IDF troops allegedly mistook them for Palestinian Arab terrorists or militants. The Egyptian government accepts an apology from Israeli Prime Minister Ariel Sharon and demands an investigation on the incident.
- December 1 – Israeli Prime Minister Ariel Sharon ends the Likud-led coalition after he fires ministers from the secular Shinui party, which voted to defeat the annual budget over subsidies to religious parties.
- December 1 – Israel and Egypt hold talks in Jerusalem to discuss the planned Israeli withdrawal from the Gaza Strip.
- December 5 – In a prisoner exchange between Israel and Egypt, Egypt releases Azzam Azzam, an Israeli Druze businessman sentenced to 15 years imprisonment by Egypt in 1997 after being accused of espionage for Israel, while Israel releases six Egyptian students who had crossed the border illegally with the aim of carrying out attacks in Israel.
- December 10 – Two Israeli scientists Aaron Ciechanover and Avram Hershko, together with an American scientist Irwin Rose, receive the Nobel Prize in Chemistry for "the discovery of ubiquitin-mediated protein degradation", and become the first Israeli Nobel laureates in chemistry.
- December 17 – The Labour Party and Ariel Sharon's Likud Party reach an agreement, forming a unity government in order to implement Israel's unilateral disengagement plan of 2004. In return, the Labor will receive eight cabinet portfolios, including "peace/disengagement minister" specially suited for Shimon Peres and Internal Affairs.
- December 29 – The Knesset passes a law against terrorism and against support of terrorism. The law prohibits funding terrorists. It also prohibits aiding the families of perceived terrorists and institutes inciting for terrorism. The law will give Israel the right to confiscate property and funds of any perceived terrorist organization, even if they do not target Israel or Israelis. The law is part of the state's legal war against terrorism and was approved 62–6.

=== Israeli–Palestinian conflict ===
The most prominent events related to the Israeli–Palestinian conflict which occurred during 2004 include:

- January 12 – Over 100,000 people rally in Tel Aviv to protest Prime Minister Ariel Sharon's plans to withdraw from the Gaza Strip and parts of the West Bank.
- January 26 – Top Hamas official Abdel-Aziz al-Rantissi offers a ten-year truce if Israel would withdraw from territory occupied since 1967 and acknowledge the creation of an Arab state. Israel dismisses the truce offer as "ridiculous".
- January 30 – Sheik Ahmed Yassin, leader of Hamas, announces that his group is making an all-out effort to kidnap Israeli soldiers to use as bargaining chips for Palestinian Arabs in Israeli prisons, following the recent prisoner exchange between Israel and Hezbollah in which the remains of three Israeli soldiers and a businessman were exchanged for over 400 prisoners on January 29, 2004.
- February 2 – Prime Minister of Israel Ariel Sharon announces to the Ha'aretz newspaper that he plans to dismantle 17 Israeli settlements in the Gaza Strip and says that he foresees a time when there are no Jews in Gaza at all.
- May 2 – Members of Israel's Likud Party vote on whether or not to approve Ariel Sharon's proposal to pull out of the Gaza Strip unilaterally. Rejection of the proposal is seen as a major blow to the Sharon government. Sharon subsequently says that he will not resign and may modify the plan.
- June 30 – The Israeli Supreme Court issues a landmark ruling that a 30-kilometer planned stretch of the separation barrier in eastern Jerusalem violates the legal rights of the local Palestinian Arab population to an extent not justified by security concerns, and therefore must be changed.
- July 21 – The United Nations General Assembly passes a resolution demanding that Israel obey the International Court of Justice ruling that the West Bank barrier should be dismantled. Israel condemns the resolution and announces that it will not stop building the barrier.
- July 25 – Over 100,000 opponents of Israel's unilateral disengagement plan of 2004 participate in a human chain from Gush Katif, to the Western Wall, Jerusalem (90 kilometers).
- September 12 – 40,000 demonstrators protest in Jerusalem against Prime Minister Ariel Sharon's plans to force all Israeli Jews to leave the Gaza Strip and parts of the West Bank.
- October 5 – Second Intifada: The United States vetoes a United Nations resolution urging Israel to halt its current offensive in the Gaza Strip. Over 70 Palestinian Arabs, including civilians, have died in the offensive.
- October 6 – Second Intifada: Three Palestinian militants and three Palestinian Arab civilians, including a 15-year-old boy, are killed after Israel shells the town of Beit Lahiya.
- October 14 – About 100,000 Israelis in 100 cities march in a series of demonstrations across Israel opposing their government's proposal to withdraw Israeli settlers from the Gaza Strip and parts of the West Bank.
- October 16 – Second Intifada: Israeli forces withdraw from the northern Gaza Strip, ending Operation Days of Penitence.
- October 26 – The Knesset approves Israeli Prime Minister Ariel Sharon's plan to withdraw 21 settlements from the Gaza Strip and four from the West Bank by the following year. Israeli Finance Minister Benjamin Netanyahu and three other cabinet ministers from Sharon's ruling Likud government threaten to resign if a referendum over the plan will not be held.

==== Notable Palestinian militant operations against Israeli targets ====
The most prominent Palestinian militant acts and operations committed against Israeli targets during 2004 include:

- January 14 – Erez Crossing bombing: A female Palestinian Arab suicide bomber, kills two Israeli soldiers, a border policeman, and a security guard for a private manpower company and wounds twelve others at the Erez Crossing. Hamas and the Al-Aqsa Martyrs' Brigades jointly claim responsibility. Hamas states it used a woman suicide bomber for the first time in order to counter Israeli precautions.
- January 29 – 2004 Jerusalem bus 19 bombing: 11 killed, 50+ injured when a Palestinian suicide bomber attacks a bus in Jerusalem. The Al-Aqsa Martyrs' Brigades claims responsibility for the attack. Hamas also claims responsibility for the bombing and denounces Al-Aqsa.
- February 22 – Liberty Bell Park bus bombing: Eight Israelis killed and 60 injured when a Palestinian suicide bomber attacks a Egged bus No. 14 in Jerusalem, others. The Al-Aqsa Martyrs' Brigades claim responsibility for the attack.
- March 6 – Erez Crossing interception: Four Palestinian militants apprehended in three vehicles, two discovered with explosives.
- March 14 – 2004 Ashdod Port bombings: Ten Israeli civilians killed when a Palestinian suicide bombers attacks the southern port of Ashdod. Hamas and the Al-Aqsa Martyrs' Brigades claim joint responsibility for the blasts.
- April 17 – Second Erez Crossing attack: An Israeli border policeman is killed and three other Israelis are wounded in a suicide bombing at the Erez Crossing into the northern Gaza Strip.
- April 26 – Deir al-Balah suicide attack: Four IDF soldiers are mildly injured when a suicide bomber attacks the entrance of the Erez terminal of Deir al-Balah.
- April 30 – After failing to bomb his original target, a bus full of Jewish settlers, a Palestinian Arab suicide bomber detonates an explosive device next to an Israeli army patrol, injuring all four soldiers. Hamas claims responsibility.
- May 2 – Murder of Tali Hatuel and her four daughters: Palestinian Arab gunmen kill a pregnant Israeli mother, Tali Hatuel, and all four of her young daughters near the Kissufim Crossing into the Gaza Strip. The killers are shot dead by security forces. The incident is believed to have influenced voting intentions in the vote, held the same day, by Likud Party members on whether or not to approve a unilaterally pull out from the Gaza Strip.
- May 22 – Beka'ot checkpoint bombing
- July 11 – Tel Aviv bus stop bombing: An explosive device, packed with ball bearings and bolts, detonates in the bushes behind a bus stop in Tel Aviv, killing one person and injuring thirty-two others.
- August 11 – Kalandia checkpoint attack: Two people are killed and 16 are wounded when an explosive device is detonated by Palestinian militants inside an Arab taxi as it attempts to cross the Kalandia military check point just north of Jerusalem. The Al-Aqsa Martyrs' Brigades faction of Fatah claims responsibility and expresses regret that Arabs are among the dead and wounded.
- August 31 – Beersheba bus bombings: Two buses near the Beersheba municipality building are blown up by a Palestinian Arab suicide bomber. The suicide bomber takes advantage of the fact that the two buses were standing together. He detonates a bomb on one bus and then explodes a second bomb on the second bus. At least fifteen Israelis are killed and around eighty-five injured. The military wing of Hamas claims responsibility for the attack.
- September 1 – Two Palestinian Arab suicide bombers blow themselves up almost simultaneously on two buses in central Beersheba, killing 16 Israelis and wounding dozens.
- September 8 – Baka al-Sharkiyeh checkpoint attack: A car bomb explodes near an Israel Border Police check point in Baqa al-Sharkiya, killing only one of the soldiers. The Fatah's Al-Aqsa Martyrs' Brigades claim responsibility.
- September 14 – Kalandia Gate suicide bombing
- September 22 – French Hill Junction bombing: A Palestinian Arab female suicide bomber detonates her bomb at the French Hill intersection in Jerusalem. Two people are killed and fifteen injured in the attack. The blast is targeted at the large number of civilians at the station at the time of attack. The military wing of al-Fatah claims responsibility for the attack.
- October 6 – Three Hamas militants are killed after infiltrating the Israeli settlement of Kfar Darom. One of the militants blows up when hit by Israeli gunfire, killing a Thai worker in addition to himself. The other two militants are killed by IDF forces.
- October 7 – Sinai bombings: 34 killed, including twelve Israelis and 171 injured in three bombing attacks by Palestinian militants at holiday resorts in the Sinai Peninsula.
- November 1 – Carmel Market bombing: Three Israelis killed and 30 injured by a 16-year-old Palestinian suicide bomber boy attacking a Tel Aviv outdoor market. The Marxist Popular Front for the Liberation of Palestine claims responsibility.
- November 11 – Three Al-Aqsa Martyrs Brigadiers killed by IDF after infiltrating the Israeli settlement of Netzarim.
- November 21 – Two Palestinian militants killed by the IDF while attempting to carry out an attack on Kissufim road to Gush Katif
- December 7 – Karni crossing attack: Two Palestinian militants killed by IDF missile attacks in al-Shojaeya neighborhood in Gaza City on 7 December 2004.
- December 8 – Five Palestinian weapon smugglers killed by IDF at the Rafah crossing of the Egyptian border.
- December 12 – At least five Israeli soldiers are killed and ten are injured as a tunnel rigged with 1,500 kg of explosives explodes near the Rafah crossing between the Gaza Strip and Egypt. Hamas and an al-Aqsa Martyrs' Brigades' offshoot called "Fatah Hawk" claim joint responsibility.
- December 14 – A Thai worker is killed and two more are injured in Gush Katif by mortar shells fired by Palestinian Arabs.

Notable Israeli military operations against Palestinian militancy targets

The most prominent Israeli military counter-terrorism operations (military campaigns and military operations) carried out against Palestinian militants during 2004 include:

- February 25 – The Israel army imposes a curfew on Rammallah during which members of Shin Bet raided four banks and seized between $6.7m.-$9m. from accounts "linked to terrorist activities".
- February 28 – Jabaliya refugee camp: The Israeli army assassinates Islamic Jihad military commander Muhammad Judah by firing missiles at his car. Two passengers are also killed and eleven bystanders wounded.
- March 22 – Second Intifada: Hamas leader Ahmed Yassin and five of his bodyguards are killed by hellfire missiles fired from an IAF AH-64 Apache helicopter.
- April 17 – Second Intifada: Yassin's successor Abdel Aziz al-Rantissi is killed by hellfire missiles fired from an IAF AH-64 Apache helicopter at his car.
- May 18–23 – Second Intifada: Operation Rainbow – Israel launches a large offensive in the city of Rafah in the Gaza Strip. The IDF's stated aim was to clear terrorist infrastructure, to find smuggling tunnels connecting the Gaza Strip to Egypt, and to kill militants after the deaths of 13 Israeli soldiers in guerrilla attacks.
- September 7 – Second Intifada: An Israeli attack on a Hamas training camp kills 14 members of the military wing of Hamas.
- September 30 – October 16 – Second Intifada: Operation Days of Penitence – Israel carries out a 17-day military operation in the northern Gaza Strip. The operation, focused on the town of Beit Hanoun and Beit Lahia and Jabalia refugee camp, which were used as launching sites of Qassam rockets on the Israeli town of Sderot and Israeli settlements in the Gaza Strip, and in particular in response to the death of two children in Sderot. The operation results in the deaths of between 104 and 133 Palestinian Arabs (42 civilians), and five people on the Israeli side (two soldiers and three civilians).
- November 21 – Three Fatah militants are killed in a gunfight with YAMAM, an Israeli Police counterterrorist unit. One Israeli police officer sustained light injuries.

=== Unknown dates ===
- The founding of the community settlement Giv'ot Bar.

== Notable deaths ==
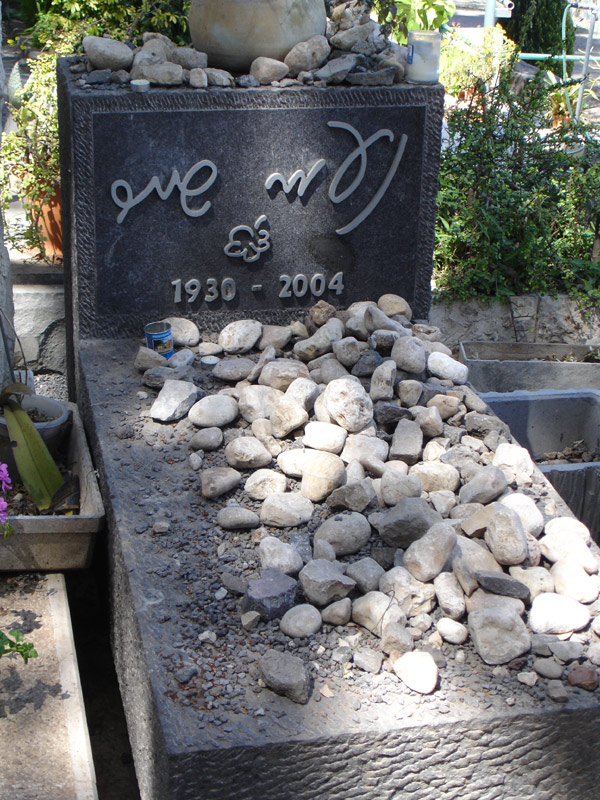
Israeli songwriter Naomi Shemer's grave on the shores of the Sea of Galilee. The stones were left by visitors, in keeping with an ancient Jewish custom

- March 12 – Natan Yonatan (born 1923), Soviet (Ukraine)-born Israeli poet.
- March 15 – Alfred Mansfeld (born 1912), Russian-born Israeli architect.
- June 26 – Naomi Shemer (born 1930), Israeli songwriter.
- June 29 – Arik Lavie (born 1927), German-born Israeli singer and actor.
- August 20 – Moshe Shamir (born 1921), Israeli politician and novelist.
- October 3 – Ze'ev Lev (born 1922), Austrian-born Israeli physicist and Torah scholar.
- October 16 – Uzi Hitman (born 1952), Israeli singer, songwriter and composer, heart attack.
- November 4 – Michael Gross (born 1920), Israeli painter, sculptor and conceptual artist.
- November 5 - Nili Natkho (born 1982), Circassian Israeli basketball player.
- November 23 – Rafael Eitan (born 1929), Israeli politician and former chief of staff, drowned.
- December 16 – Yehudit Naot (born 1944), Israeli scientist and politician.

== Major public holidays ==
Purim - March 7

Yom HaShoah - April 19

Yom HaZikaron - April 26

Yom HaAtzmaut - April 27

Lag BaOmer - May 9

Shavuot - May 26

Tisha B'Av - July 27

Rosh Hashana - September 16-17

Yom Kippur - September 25

Sukkot - September 30 - October 6

Hanukkah - December 8-15

== See also ==
- 2004 in Israeli film
- 2004 in Israeli television
- 2004 in Israeli music
- 2004 in Israeli sport
- Israel in the Eurovision Song Contest 2004
- Israel at the 2004 Summer Olympics
- 2004 in the Palestinian territories
