= Ayman Alkurd =

Palestinian footballer (1980–2009)

Ayman Alkurd (12 July 1980 – 13 January 2009) was a Palestinian footballer who played for the Palestine national team and his last team was Falasteen Al-Riyadi.

Alkurd died on 13 January 2009, at the age of 29, during the Israeli military operation in the Gaza Strip in an airstrike on his building. Additional casualties of the military operation include former national player Wajeh Moshate and a member of the National Olympic Committee of Palestine, Khalil Abed Jaber. Another player on the national team, Mahmoud Sarsak, was jailed for three years with no apparent reason.
