= List of Israeli films of 2008 =

A list of films produced by the Israeli film industry in 2008.

== 2008 releases ==
Premiere		Title	Director	Cast	Genre	Notes	Ref
F E B	8	Lemon Tree (Hebrew: עץ לימון)	Eran Riklis	Hiam Abbass, Ali Suliman		Israeli-French-German co-production; Won the 'Panorama Audience Award' at the Berlin Film Festival (Germany)	
F E B	14	Restless (Hebrew: חסר מנוחה)	Amos Kollek	Moshe Ivgy, Ran Danker, Michael Moshonov	Drama		
M A Y	15	Waltz with Bashir (Hebrew: ואלס עם באשיר)	Ari Folman		Animation, Biography, Drama, War	Nominated for the Academy Award for Best Foreign Language Film	
M A Y	15	7 Days (Hebrew: שבעה, lit. "Seven days of mourning")	Ronit Elkabetz; Shlomi Elkabetz	Ronit Elkabetz, Yael Abecassis, Hana Laszlo, Moshe Ivgy, Keren Mor, Alon Aboutboul	Drama, War	Won the Wolgin Award for Best Feature Film (the festival's top prize for Israeli cinema, worth 140,000 ILS at the time	
J U L	3	Lost Islands (Hebrew: איים אבודים)	Reshef Levy	Oshri Cohen, Michael Moshonov, Shmil Ben Ari, Orly Silbersatz Banai, Ofer Shechter	Comedy, Drama	The film was a major contender at the Israeli Academy Awards (Ophir Awards) in 2008, receiving 14 nominations (the most that year) and winning 4 awards.	
J U L	16	Out of the Blue (Hebrew: אצבע אלוהים, lit. "God's finger")	Yigal Bursztyn	Alon Aboutboul, Moshe Ivgy	Comedy, Crime, Drama		
A U G	30	Adam Resurrected (Hebrew: אדם בן כלב, lit. "Adam, son of a dog")	Paul Schrader	Jeff Goldblum, Willem Dafoe, Derek Jacobi, Ayelet Zurer	Drama, War	Israeli-American-German co-production	
S E P	4	$9.99	Tatia Rosenthal		Animation, Drama	Israeli-Australian co-production	
O C T	17	Eli & Ben (Hebrew: איליי ובן)	Ori Ravid	Lior Ashkenazi	Family, Drama		

== Awards ==
=== Ophir Award ===	=== Wolgin Award ===

== Notable deaths ==
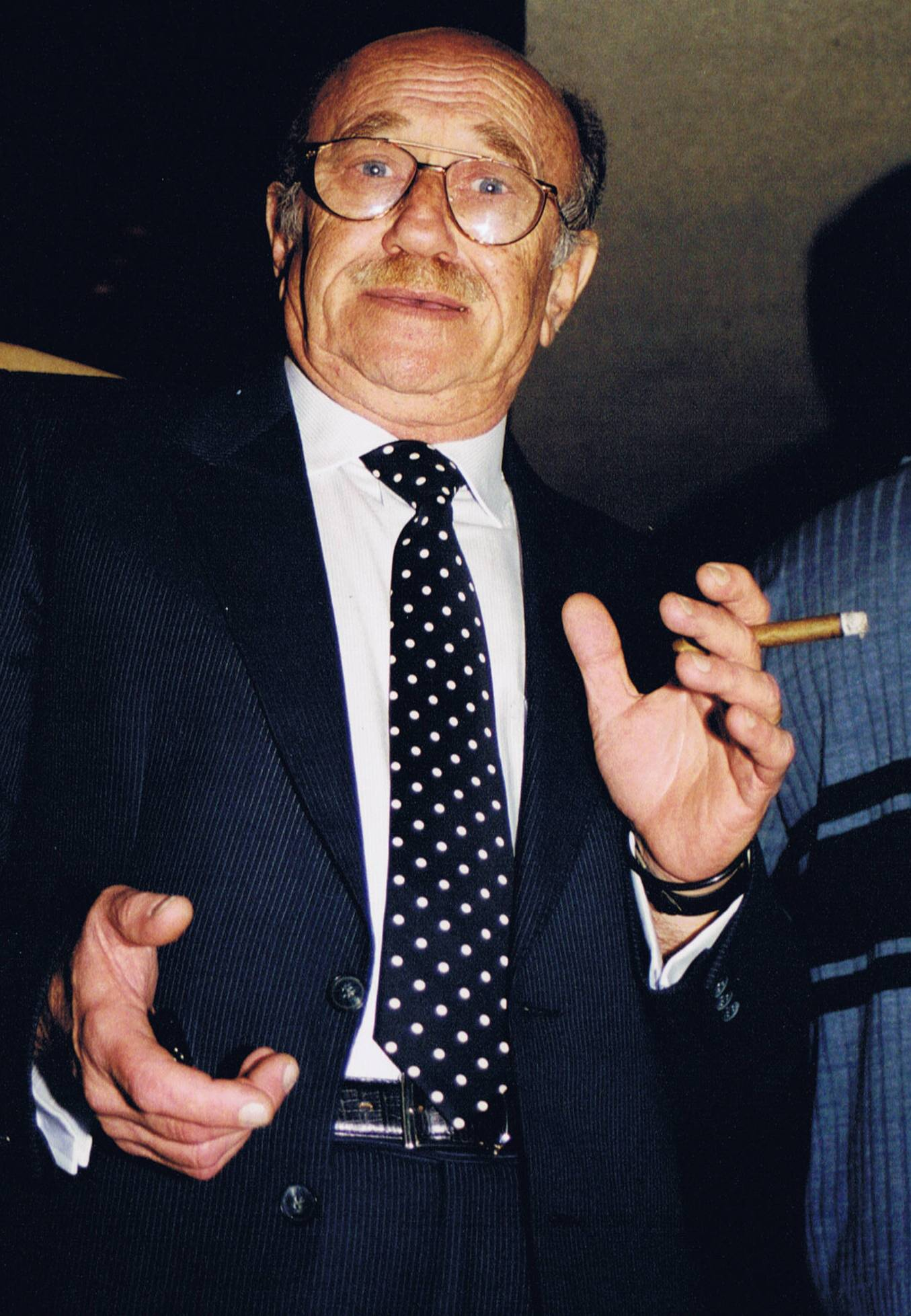
Mosko Alkalai

- 1 April – Mosko Alkalai, 77, Israeli actor (Blaumilch Canal, The Fox in the Chicken Coop, Yana's Friends) - respiratory failure. (born 1931)
- 1 April – Shosh Atari, 58, Israeli radio presenter and actress - heart attack. (born 1949)
- 20 April – Nissan Nativ, 86, Israeli director, actor and acting teacher. (born 1922)

== See also ==
- 2008 in Israel
