= List of Israeli films of 2004 =

A list of films produced by the Israeli film industry in 2004.

== 2004 releases ==
Premiere		Title	Director	Cast	Genre	Notes	Ref
F E B	5	Walk on Water (Hebrew: ללכת על המים)	Eytan Fox	Lior Ashkenazi	Drama, Mystery, Thriller		
F E B	10	Campfire (Hebrew: מדורת השבט)	Joseph Cedar	Michaela Eshet, Hani Furstenberg, Maya Maron, Moshe Ivgy, Assi Dayan	Drama		
F E B	19	Henry's Dream (Hebrew: חלומו של הנרי)	Eitan Green	Menashe Noy	Drama		
M A R	24	Turn Left at the End of the World (Hebrew: סוף העולם שמאלה)	Avi Nesher	Neta Garty, Liraz Charhi	Drama, Romance		
M A Y	13	The Gospel According to God (Hebrew: הבשורה על פי אלוהים)	Assi Dayan	Assi Dayan	Comedy, Drama, Fantasy		
M A Y	17	Or (Hebrew: אור)	Keren Yedaya	Ronit Elkabetz, Dana Ivgy	Drama	Israeli-French co-production	
J U N	11	Black Jack (Hebrew: בלאק ג'ק)	Matti Harari and Arik Lubetzki	Uri Gavriel	Action		
J U L	2	Avanim (Hebrew: אבנים)	Raphael Nadjari	Asi Levi, Danny Steg and Uri Gabriel	Drama	Israeli-French co-production	
J U L	7	God's Sandbox (Hebrew: טאהרה)	Doron Eran	Meital Dohan	Drama		
J U L	11	Ushpizin (Hebrew: האושפיזין)	Giddi Dar	Shuli Rand, Michal Bat-Sheva Rand, Shaul Mizrahi, Ilan Ganani	Drama		
J U L	22	Ahava Colombianit (Hebrew: אהבה קולומביאנית)	Shay Kanot	Mili Avital, Assi Cohen	Comedy, Drama, Romance		
J U L	28	Mashehu Matok (Hebrew: משהו מתוק)	Dan Turgeman	Dan Turgeman	Drama, Romance		
A U G	11	The Syrian Bride (Hebrew: הכלה הסורית)	Eran Riklis	Hiam Abbass, Makram Khoury, Clara Khoury	Comedy, Drama	Israeli-French-German co-production	
S E P	2	Metallic Blues	Danny Verete		Drama	Israeli-Canadian-German co-production	
S E P	7	Promised Land (Hebrew: הארץ המובטחת)	Amos Gitai		Drama, Thriller	Israeli-French-British co-production	
O C T	4	Delusions (Hebrew: דמיונות)	Etsion Nimrod and Lachmi Saar	Osnat Hakim, Leon Rozenberg, Riki Blich	Comedy, Drama		
N O V	22	To Take a Wife (Hebrew: ולקחת לך אישה)	Ronit Elkabetz and Shlomi Elkabetz	Ronit Elkabetz	Drama	Israeli-French co-production	

== Awards ==
=== Ophir Award ===	=== Wolgin Award ===

== Notable deaths ==
- June 29 – Arik Lavie, Israeli singer and actor (b. 1927).

== See also ==
- 2004 in Israel
