= List of Israeli films of 2005 =

A list of films produced by the Israeli film industry in 2005.

== 2005 releases ==
Premiere		Title	Director	Cast	Genre	Notes	Ref
J A N	13	Riki Riki (Hebrew: ריקי ריקי)	Eitan Anner	Guri Alfi, Gila Almagor, Tal Friedman	Comedy		
F E B	5	Distortion (Hebrew: דיסטורשן)	Haim Bouzaglo		Drama		
F E B	11	Live and Become (Hebrew: תחייה ותהייה)	Radu Mihaileanu		Drama	An Israeli-French-Belgian-Italian co-production; The film won the Most Popular International Film category at the 2005 Vancouver International Film Festival.	
F E B	14	Paradise Now (Hebrew: גן עדן עכשיו)	Hany Abu-Assad		Crime, Drama	An Israeli-Palestinian-French-German-Dutch co-production; The film won a Golden Globe for best foreign language film and was nominated for an Academy Award in the same category.	
M A Y	1	Bruno's in Love (Hebrew: ברונו מאוהב)	Ilan Heitner	Shalom Assayag, Benny Avni, Tchia Danon, Ilan Dar	Drama	Made-for-TV film	
M A Y	19	Free Zone (Hebrew: אזור חופשי)	Amos Gitai	Natalie Portman, Hiam Abbass, Hanna Laslo	Comedy, Drama	An Israeli-Belgian-French-Spanish co-production; In the 2005 Cannes Film Festival, Hanna Laslo won the Best Actress award and the film was nominated for the Golden Palm award.	
M A Y	24	At the Green Line	Jesse Atlas		Documentary		
J U L	8	What a Wonderful Place (Hebrew: איזה מקום נפלא)	Eyal Halfon	Uri Gavriel	Drama		
J U L	14	Joy (Hebrew: מוכרחים להיות שמח)	Julie Shles	Sigalit Fuchs, Tal Friedman, Dorit Lev-Ari, Keren Mor	Comedy, Drama		
J U L	15	Close to Home (Hebrew: קרוב לבית)	Vardit Bilu and Dalia Hager	Smadar Sayar and Naama Schendar	Drama		
J U L	21	Schwartz Dynasty (Hebrew: שושלת שוורץ)	Amir Hasfari and Shmuel Hasfari	Miryam Zohar, Tal Friedman, Yehuda Levi	Comedy		
O C T	20	Alenbi Romance (Hebrew: אלנבי רומאנס)	Yanai Goz and Yoni Zicholtz		Drama, Romance		
O C T	24	Frozen Days (Hebrew: ימים קפואים)	Danny Lerner		Drama, Mystery, Thriller		
D E C	27	Days of Love (Hebrew: ימים של אהבה)	Menahem Golan		Musical		

== Awards ==
=== Ophir Award ===	=== Wolgin Award ===

== Notable deaths ==
- January 29 – Ephraim Kishon, Israeli satirist, dramatist, screenwriter and film director, apparent heart attack. (b. 1924).

== See also ==
- 2005 in Israel
