= Hani Awijan =

Palestinian militant (1977–2006)

- Born: 1977
- Died: July 29, 2006 (aged 28–29)
- Military career
- Allegiance: Palestine
- Branch: Palestinian Islamic Jihad (PIJ)

Hani Awijan (1977 – July 29, 2006) was an Islamic militant in the Palestinian Islamic Jihad (PIJ) military wing, The Al-Quds brigades. He was reportedly the leader of the Nablus branch in the West Bank.

He had been implicated in a series of attacks against Israelis.

Awijan was shot by Israeli undercover agents operating in Nablus as he was playing soccer with members of his family and friends, according to the Associated Press. In response to the operation, crowds of sympathizers called a strike in the city and burned tires.
