= Ersal Commercial Center =

Business district in Ramallah, West Bank, Palestine

Coordinates: 31°55′15.3″N 35°12′34.8″E

The Ersal Commercial Center (Arabic: الإرسال سنتـــر), also known as the Al-Ersal real-estate project, is a partially-completed business district in Ramallah, Palestine. It is one of the largest $400 million commercial development under construction in Ramallah, Palestine. The project is co-sponsored by the Palestine Investment Fund (PIF) and The Land Holding, a Saudi real estate company, which have created a new development company called Arduna to construct the Ersal Center. Ground was broken in October 2008 on the projected 4-year development project.
