= 2008 Dimona suicide bombing =

Terrorist incident in Dimona, Israel

- The attack site
- Location: 31°03′52.23″N 35°02′03.57″E; Dimona, Israel
- Date: February 4, 2008
- Attack type: Suicide attack
- Deaths: 1 Israeli civilian (+ 2 bombers)
- Injuries: 9 Israeli civilians
- Perpetrators: Two Palestinian assailants, working in a Hamas cell under Izzedine al Qassam Brigades commander Ahmed Jabari.

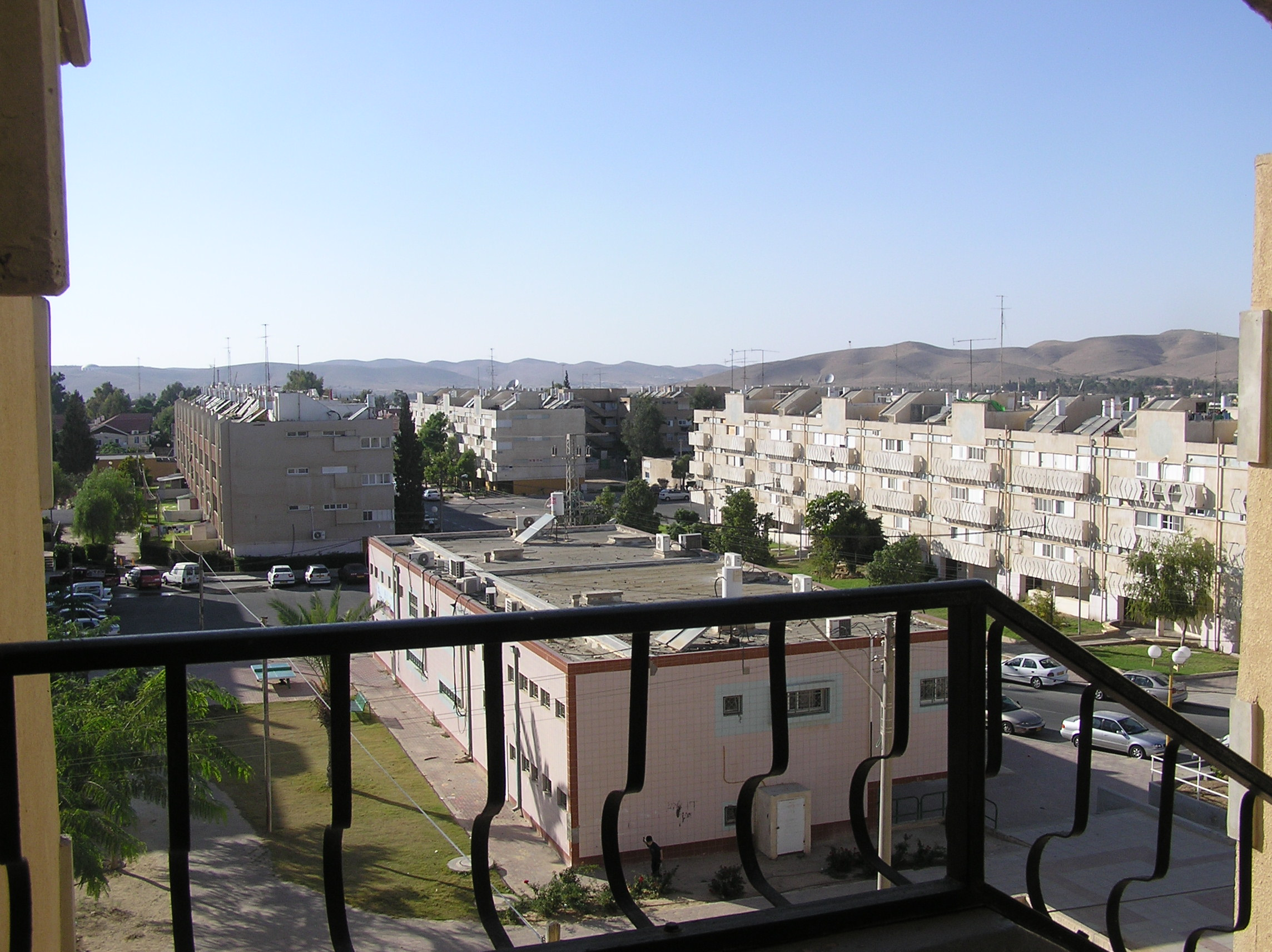
Dimona

On February 4, 2008, a Palestinian terrorist detonated an explosives belt at a shopping centre in Dimona, Israel, killing one women and injuring thirty eight people, one critically. The suicide attack was carried out by Hamas

A second terrorist was shot by police before he could detonate his explosives belt.

== The attack ==
On February 4, 2008, a Palestinian militant detonated an explosives belt at a shopping centre in Dimona, Israel.

The Israeli police managed to shoot dead an accomplice who was wounded in the first blast before he could detonate his own belt.

One Israeli woman was killed in the attack while nine other people were injured (one of them critically). It was the first suicide attack resulting in Israeli civilian casualties since the 2007 Eilat bombing on January 29, 2007.

The Israeli police managed to shoot dead an accomplice who was wounded in the first blast before he could detonate his own belt.

== The victims ==
Lyubov Razdolskaya, 73, of Dimona was killed in the attack and her husband was critically wounded and taken to Soroka Hospital together with the other 37 others who were wounded.

== The perpetrators ==
The al-Aqsa Martyrs' Brigades and the Popular Front for the Liberation of Palestine initially claimed responsibility, but the two Gazans they named as the attackers did not match the bodies found at the scene. Hamas claimed responsibility on February 5, naming the perpetrators as Muhammed Herbawi (محمد الحرباوي) and Shadi Zghayer (شادي الزغيّر), both from the Palestinian city of Hebron in the West Bank, the place which they are believed to have traveled from. Israeli intelligence believes the attack was ordered by Izzedine al Qassam Brigades commander Ahmed Jabari with the support of Gaza-based Hamas leader Mahmoud al-Zahar; Jabari contacted an ally in Hebron's Qawasameh clan—Ayoub Qawasmeh—who recruited the eventual perpetrators from a local Hamas soccer team. Scott Atran states that the Hamas politburo in Damascus was not informed of the attack. Israel demolished Herbawi and Zghayer's homes, while "the Aqsa Martyrs' Brigades website went down for three days, presumably the result of an electronic attack after its bogus claim."

== Israeli retaliation ==
On July 26, 2008, IDF and Israeli police forces killed Shihab Natsheh (25), a Hamas member from Hebron. Natsheh, according to the IDF, was the explosives engineer who prepared the demolition charge used to carry out the Dimona suicide bombing.

== Government reactions ==
Involved parties

- Israel: Prime Minister Ehud Olmert told a meeting of his Kadima party that Israel was fighting a "relentless war... against anyone who tries to harm Israeli citizens".
- Hamas spokesman Ayman Taha praised the bombing as a "glorious act" and said that it was a "natural reaction to months of killing" of Palestinians by the Israeli military.

International

- United Kingdom: Secretary of State for Foreign and Commonwealth Affairs David Miliband condemned the attack in a press release and said: "Today’s attack, the first in Israel for a year, aimed to undermine the peace process. Terrorist atrocities must not deflect us from our shared goal of just and lasting peace between Israelis and Palestinians based on a two state solution".
- United States: Department of State spokesman Sean McCormack condemned the attack during a press briefing and said: "All of these incidents point to the fact that we need to do everything that we possibly can, along with our partners in the international system, to help the Israelis and the Palestinians come to a political agreement and accommodation on the issues that separate them. At that point, the Palestinian people will be able to decide which pathway they want to go down; do they want to go down the pathway of having a Palestinian state or do they want to continue down a pathway represented by Hamas and other rejectionist groups that's a pathway of violence and that does not lead to a state".
