= Fima (artist) =

Fima (Efraim Roeytenberg)
- Born: 22 December 1914; Harbin
- Died: 16 October 2005 (aged 90)
- Education: Russian Academy of Art and Shanghai Academy of Art
- Known for: Painting
- Movement: Israeli art

Fima (born Efraim Roeytenberg) (1914 – 2005) was an Israeli artist born in China. He spent most of his career in France.

== Biography ==
Ephraim (Yafim) Roeytenberg, known as "Fima" or "Pima", was born 22 December 1914 and grew up in Harbin, China. Harbin was a Russian-Chinese city with a large white émigré community. Roeytenberg was the son of Russian-Jewish parents. His father was an engineer who worked on the construction of the Chinese Eastern Railway.

Roeytenberg studied in a Russian high school in Harbin, where he learned Chinese as well. After graduating secondary school in 1933, he moved to Shanghai, where he studied architecture while taking painting classes at night. During the 1940s, he worked in Shanghai painting set designs for shows. He attended and later taught at the Russian Academy of Fine Arts in Shanghai. In 1947, he had a solo exhibition at the Jewish Recreation Club in Shanghai. He also displayed his work in group shows.

Roeytenberg immigrated to Israel in February 1949 and settled in Jerusalem. During the 1950s, he made contacts with contemporary artists in Israel and explored new ways of painting. In 1954, Roeytenberg traveled to Italy and in 1956 to Paris. In 1960, he had a sold-out exhibition at the Rina gallery in Jerusalem.

In 1961, Roeytenberg moved to Paris, where he developed an association with the Jacques Massol gallery. He was there until 2002, exhibiting works in Paris, Israel, and elsewhere. His works were displayed at the Bineth gallery, and he took part in the 1964 Art Israel show at the New York Museum of Modern Art. In 1966, after the death of his wife, Roeytenberg spent a year in Finland. There, he met his second wife.

Roeytenberg exhibited at the Israel Museum, Jerusalem in 1970, the Jewish Museum in New York in 1972, the Barbican Centre in London in 1990, and had a solo exhibition at the Tel Aviv Museum in 1976.

In 2002, Roeytenberg returned to live in Israel. He travelled to Hong Kong in 2004 when his work was being exhibited there. He continued to paint until a month before his death. He died in Jerusalem on 16 October 2005.

== See also ==
- Visual arts in Israel
