= Mahmoud Sarsak =

Palestinian hunger striker (born 1987)

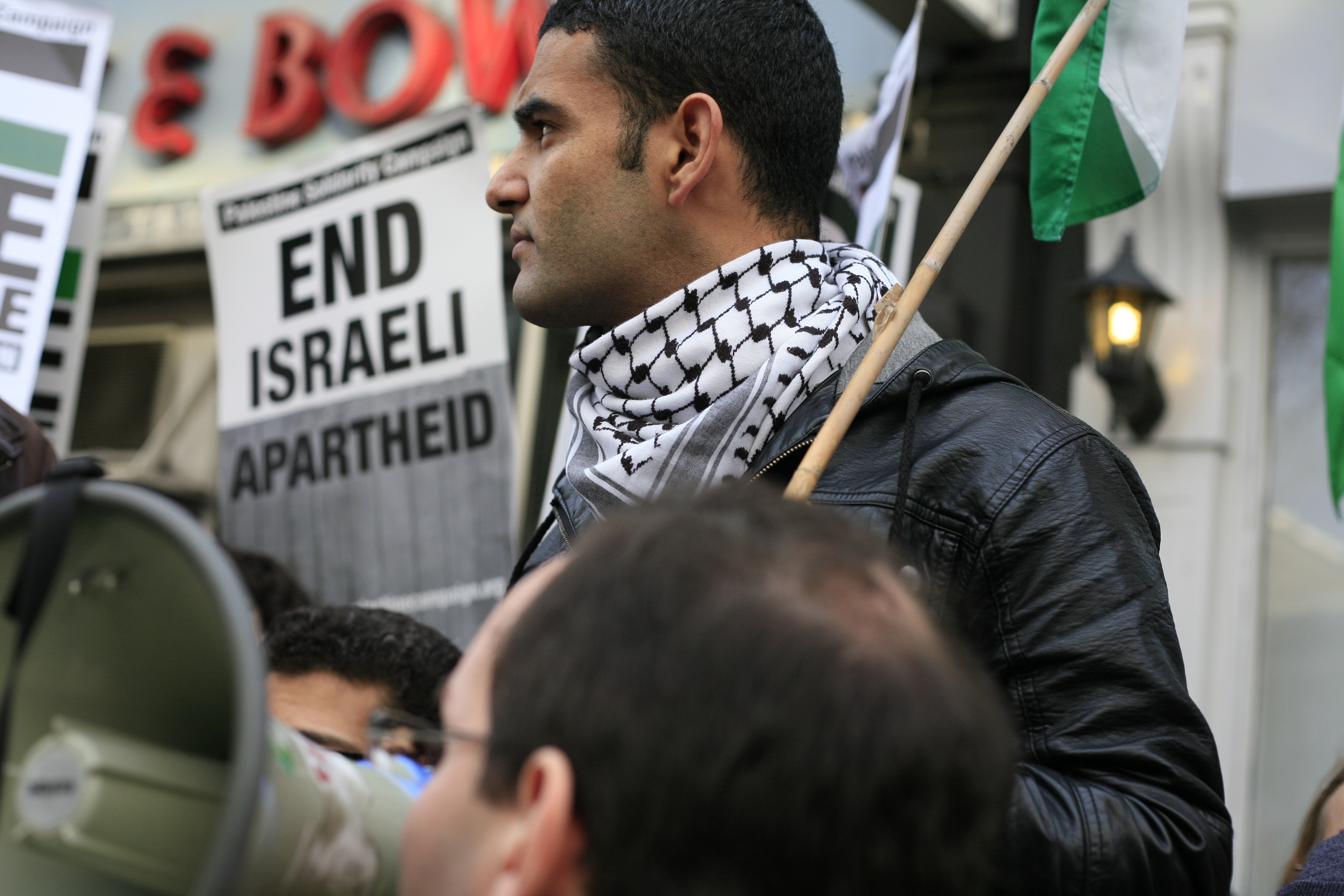
Mahmoud Sarsak

Mahmoud Sarsak (born 1987) is a Palestinian football player who was a member of the Palestine national team. In 2012, Sarsak spent three months on hunger strike while imprisoned in Israel without trial or charges. Israel had accused him of being active in Islamic Jihad, an accusation which he denied. Sarsak was released from prison on 10 July 2012, after being held for three years without formal charges.

== Football career ==
As a child, Sarsak's heroes includes Alessandro Del Piero, Frank Lampard and Zinedine Zidane. He played regularly for the Palestinian Olympic football team and twice for the Palestine national team, competing against China and Iraq. In 2013 Sarsak said he hoped to return to the national team in the future.

== Detention and hunger strike ==
Sarsak was arrested on 22 July 2009 at the Erez Crossing, while travelling between his home in Gaza and the West Bank to link up with his new club Balata Youth in Balata. He was detained for allegedly being an unlawful combatant linked to the Islamic Jihad Movement in Palestine (PIJ). The Shin Bet general security service alleged that he had once planted a bomb that injured an Israeli soldier. The agency said it did not have sufficient evidence for a trial and Sarsak was held for three years without formal charges. In 2013 Sarsak said that during his imprisonment he had been regularly subjected to physical and mental torture.

He began his hunger strike on 19 March 2012, after his administrative detention was renewed for the sixth time. His decision to begin a hunger strike was a response to the death of Zakaria Issa, a Palestinian international football player who died shortly after being released. He received on-off intravenous drips throughout his strike, and on 14 May rejected a deal which ended a month-long hunger strike by other Palestinian prisoners. He insisted on being given prisoner-of-war status, on account of his having been detained under Israel's Unlawful Combatants Law; and refused an offer from Israeli authorities under which he would be exiled to Norway for three months. During his strike, Sarsak lost nearly half his usual weight.

Palestinian officials and doctors said on 14 June that Sarsak had resumed drinking milk after meeting with Israeli officials. On 18 June, Sarsak's lawyer said he had agreed a deal to end his hunger strike in return for being released on 10 July. He was freed 97 days after beginning his hunger strike.

=== Response ===
On 5 June 2012, campaigners in London staged a series of protests aimed to draw attention to Sarsak's cause. He became a cause célèbre for football fans including Celtic F.C.'s Green Brigade.

On 8 June 2012 FIFPro, which represents professional footballers from across the globe, called for his immediate release. This was followed by similar calls from Eric Cantona, Frédéric Kanouté, UEFA President Michel Platini, FIFA President Sepp Blatter. He also received support from footballers Abou Diaby and Lilian Thuram. Outside of football, film director Ken Loach and author Noam Chomsky also requested his release. On 14 June, Amnesty International called for Sarsak to be admitted to hospital or released, saying he had been denied proper access to medical treatment, which they argued amounted to inhuman and degrading treatment.

The Palestinian Football Federation (PFF) asked UEFA to remove Israel as hosts of the 2013 UEFA European Under-21 Football Championship in response to its detention of Sarsak, which the PFF described as being in "direct violation of Fifa regulations". Platini rejected the request and rebuked the PFF for lobbying against Israel. Blatter and International Olympic Committee president Jacques Rogge supported Platini's decision.

=== Release and reaction ===
On 10 July 2012, Israel released Sarsak from prison. On his arrival in Gaza, he was greeted with a welcoming ceremony, at which dozens of PIJ members fired rifles in the air. Senior PIJ members were present at the ceremony, and Nafez Azzam, one of the group's leaders, described Sarsak as "one of our noble members." Women also waved black PIJ banners from nearby homes. Streets were decorated with huge photos of Sarsak, and after emerging from his car, Sarsak was hoisted up on shoulders and kissed and embraced by friends and family. Sarsak stated, "This is a victory for the prisoners and I thank all the Palestinian, Arab and international bodies and people who stood up for me".

==== Response ====
Following his release, Amnesty International expressed "relief" and called on Israel to end the use of administrative detention. FIFPro, the official representative organisation for all professional footballers, also celebrated Sarsak's release, stating "We, FIFPro, the representative of all professional footballers worldwide, expect that every footballer worldwide must be able to play for his country; be it Lionel Messi, Cristiano Ronaldo or Mahmoud al-Sarsak. It is written down in the FIFA regulations that all players must be allowed to play for their country." The PIJ issued a statement declaring Sarsak's release as "a victory of will, determination and steadfastness."

== Life after detention ==
Since his release Sarsak has sought to raise awareness of persecution of Palestinian football players by the Israeli government, and to oppose Israel's hosting of the Under-21 Championship.
