= 2007 Eilat bombing =

2007 Palestinian attack on civilians in Eilat, Israel

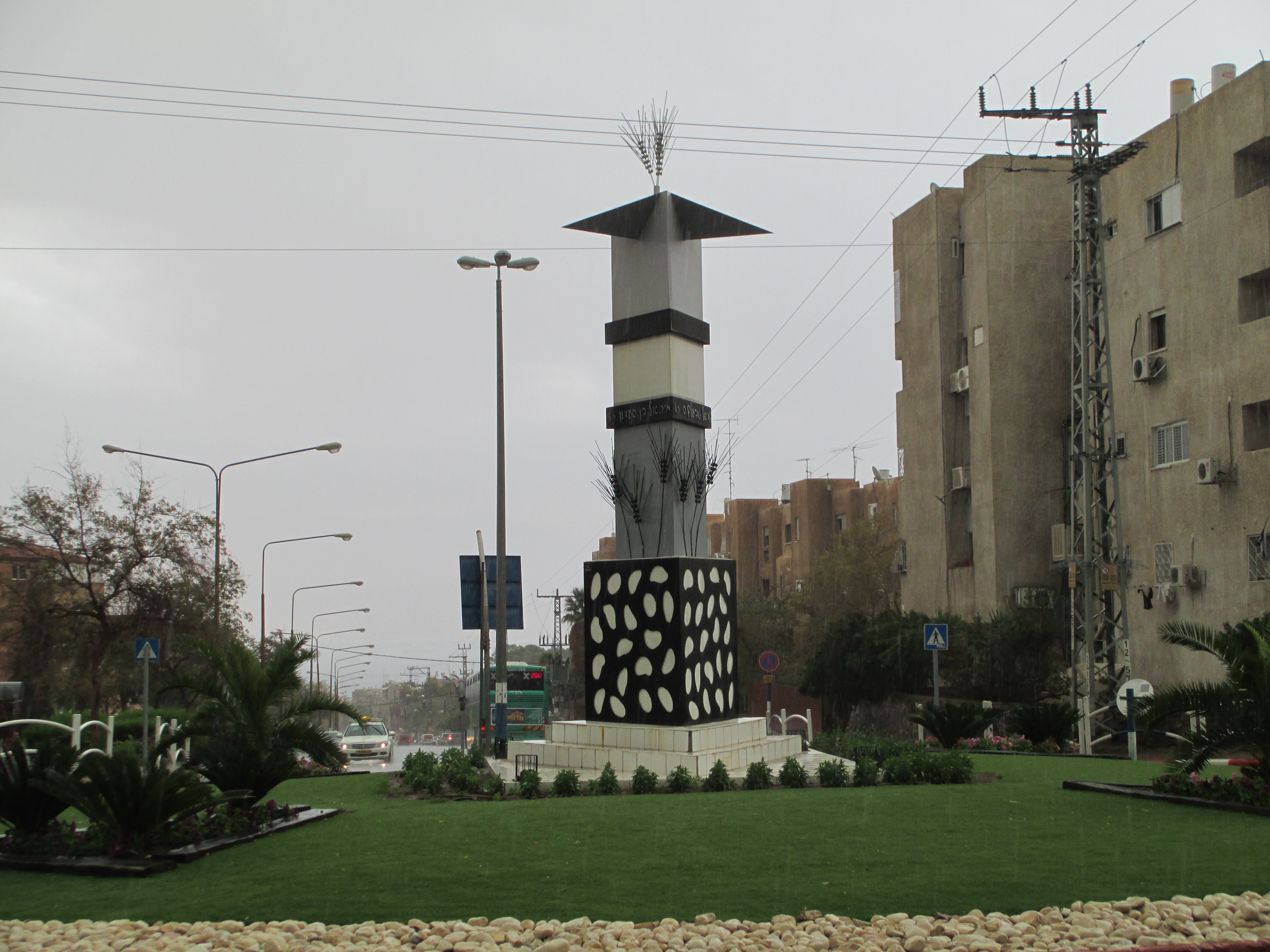
- Memorial to the victims of the suicide attack in Eilat

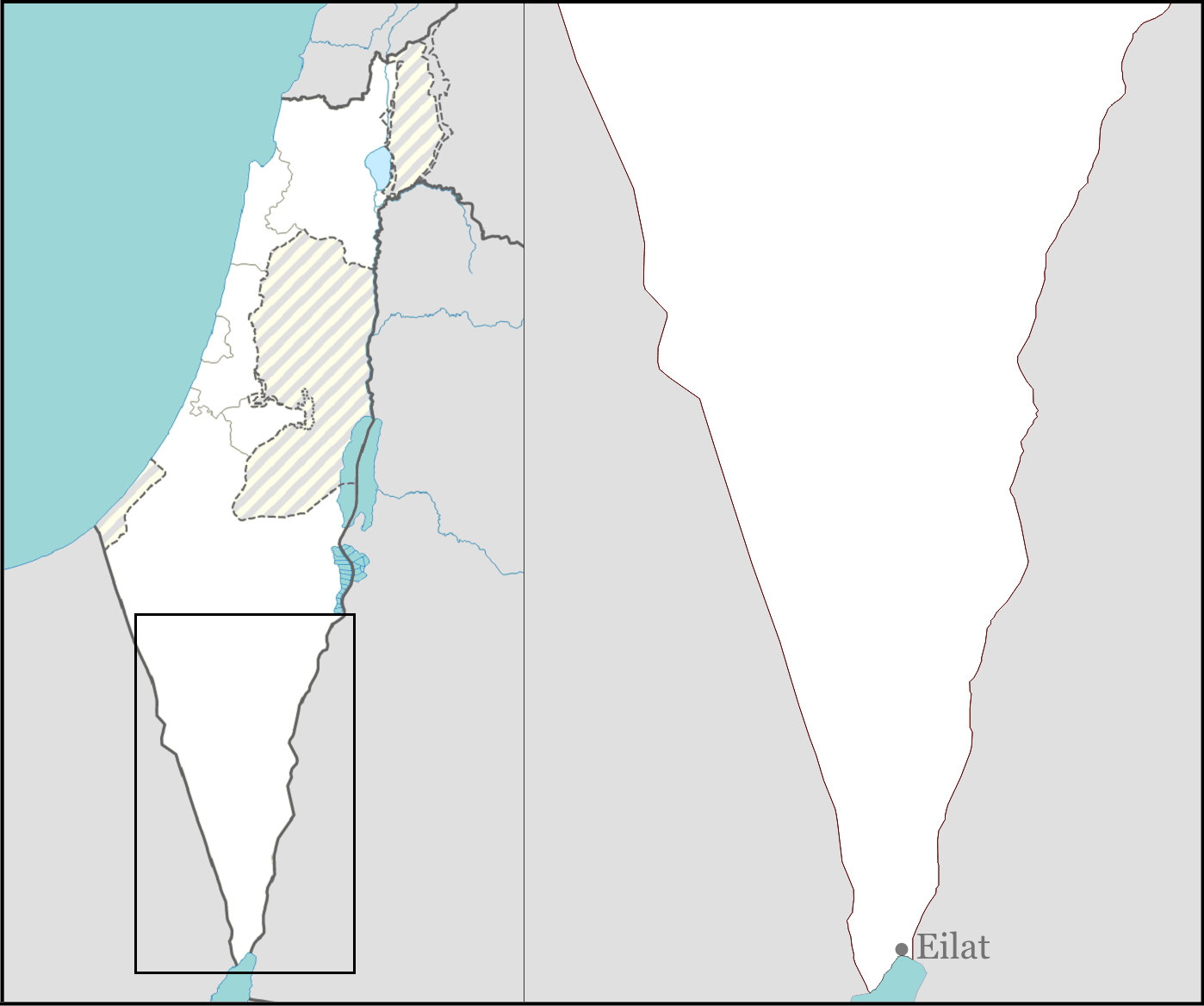
- The attack site
- Native name: פיגוע ההתאבדות באילת
- Location: 29°33′35″N 34°56′43″E; Eilat, Israel
- Date: 29 January 2007; 19 years ago c. 9:40
- Attack type: Suicide attack
- Deaths: 3 civilians (+1 bomber)
- Perpetrators: al-Aqsa Martyrs' Brigades, Islamic Jihad, Islamic Brigade claimed responsibility
- No. of participants: 1

The 2007 Eilat bombing occurred on 29 January 2007 when a Palestinian suicide bomber from the Gaza Strip infiltrated the northern suburbs of Eilat, Israel. Upon seeing the police approaching, he entered a neighbourhood bakery and detonated his bomb, killing three civilians: the bakery's co-owners and an employee.

In the midst of Palestinian factional violence, both the Islamic Jihad and the Fatah-affiliated al-Aqsa Martyrs' Brigades claimed joint responsibility. A third Palestinian group called the Islamic Brigade which was not known also claimed responsibility for the attack along with the other two mentioned above.

== Background ==
The suicide bomber was 21-year-old Muhammad Faisal al-Saqsaq of Beit Lahia, Gaza Strip. He had previously fought against Israeli troops in Jabalia and Beit Hanoun.

According to the Islamic Jihad, Saqsaq initially set out from the West Bank, and later on was smuggled into Jordan. From there he reached Eilat and was given the explosives by militants waiting for him there, after going through seven months of preparations.

Israeli Internal Security Minister Avi Dichter stated that the bomber infiltrated Israel from Egypt, echoing conclusions of the other intelligence agencies. Israel stated that the suicide bomber had infiltrated through the 220 kilometer Israeli-Egyptian border which is fenceless and patrolled by minimal IDF and Border Police forces. The suicide bomber possibly entered Egypt through a tunnel across the Philadelphi Corridor, and was then driven to the Egyptian/Israeli border, which he crossed on foot some 30 km from Eilat.

== The attack ==
After infiltrating Israel on 29 January 2007, Saqsaq made his way to Eilat, and when he was in the Simchon neighborhood, he hitched with an Israeli man who was senior officer in the IDF reserves, Lt. Col. Yossi Waltinsky. Waltinsky stated later on in an interview with Channel 10 that he had suspected the hitchhiker was up to something, mainly due to his suspicious heavy clothing and lack of knowledge of Hebrew, nevertheless, he was not able do anything at that point until the suspicious passenger was out of his car. Waltinsky dropped the passenger off near a gas station, about a kilometer from where the attack took place. He immediately phoned the local police station, explaining his encounter and telling the police he believed the man was a terrorist. The call was made seven minutes before the attack came.

Upon receiving Waltinsky's call, two patrol cars were dispatched to investigate. Meanwhile, Saqsaq, who wore a long black winter coat on a warm sunny day, soon approached a small bakery. The local police later on stated that the suicide bomber was carrying the bomb in a backbag rather than an explosives belt.

Saqsaq apparently only stopped at the bakery for coffee, and planned to proceed to a final destination to detonate the bomb, but when he saw the police approaching, he detonated the bomb in the bakery.

This was Eilat's first suicide bombing, and the first attack to succeed against Israel since 17 April 2006 (others had been attempted, but thwarted by Israeli security forces). Although it was the first suicide bomb to hit the city which is a quiet Red Sea holiday resort, through the years there have been other acts of terror committed near Eilat.

== The perpetrators ==
Palestinian Islamic Jihad claimed responsibility for the attack, together with two other terrorist groups. The bomber was identified as 21-year-old Muhammad Faisal al-Siksik from northern Gaza. Al-Siksik's family noted that he was missing for three days, but they knew he was going on a suicide bombing mission.

== Aftermath ==
Near the site of the attack, a memorial was built in memory of the three people killed in the attack.

In the Gaza Strip, a large crowd gathered outside the perpetrator's home to praise the attack. "Mohammed be happy, You will go directly to heaven." the crowd chanted, while children held pictures of the perpetrator. He looked pensive in one image, and held a machine gun in another.

== Government reactions ==
International

- Germany: Germany, then-holder of the European Union presidency, condemned the attack "in the strongest terms." An EU presidency statement said Germany "urges the Palestinian leadership to do everything in its power to put an end to terror and bring to justice those who support terror."
- Jordan: King Abdullah condemned the bombing, saying in a statement that "such attacks will only increase the sufferings of the Palestinians."
- Sweden: Minister for Foreign Affairs Carl Bildt said, "I condemn today's terrorist attack in Eilat, Israel. Violence that targets civilians is totally unacceptable. [...] The infighting among Palestinian groups is claiming more and more victims. Palestinian leaders must therefore take their responsibility and quickly find a way to resolve the crisis using peaceful means."
- United Kingdom: Foreign Secretary Margaret Beckett said, "We utterly condemn this morning's suicide attack in Eilat. There can be no justification for such attacks."
- United States: White House spokesman Tony Snow said the responsibility of the bombing lies with the Palestinian Authority government. He added, "Failure to act against terror will inevitably affect relations between that government and the international community and undermine the aspirations of the Palestinian people for a state of their own."

== See also ==
- List of Palestinian Islamic Jihad suicide attacks
- Palestinian political violence
