= 2022 in Palestine =

- Decades: 2000s; 2010s; 2020s
- See also: History of Palestine; Timeline of Palestinian history; List of years in Palestine

Events in the year 2022 in Palestine.

== Incumbents ==
| Photo | Post | Name |
|---|---|---|
| | President (PLO) | Mahmoud Abbas |
| | Prime Minister | Mohammad Shtayyeh |

- Government of Palestine – Eighteenth government of Palestine

== Events ==
Ongoing — COVID-19 pandemic in the State of Palestine

- 6 January – A bus crash in the West bank killed eight people.
- 8 February – Shin Bet officers kill three Palestinian al-Aqsa Martyrs' Brigades militants in the West Bank after opening fire on their vehicle. Israel says that the men were armed and were responsible for a series of drive-by shootings in recent weeks. Protests occur in the West Bank in response to the killings.
- 1 March – Palestinian displacement in East Jerusalem: The Israeli Supreme Court rules that four Palestinian families in East Jerusalem's Sheikh Jarrah neighborhood that were expected to be evicted can remain in their homes for the time being.
- 6 March – A 19-year-old Palestinian stabs an Israeli police officer in the Old City of Jerusalem. Police open fire on the attacker, killing him. One of the police is injured by friendly fire.
- 10 March – The Israeli Knesset votes 45–15 to bar Palestinian spouses of Israelis from obtaining citizenship if they came from the West Bank or the Gaza Strip, and blocks family reunification of Israelis and their spouses if they came from "enemy countries" such as Lebanon, Syria, and Iran. This replaces a similar emergency order that was in place from 2003 to last year, when it failed to receive enough votes to be annually renewed.
- 15 March – Two Palestinians are shot and killed in clashes with Israeli forces in the West Bank, according to Palestinian sources. A man is also killed in the Bedouin town of Rahat in the Negev following clashes with members of the Border Police.
- 23 March – The Israel Border Police arrests 17 Palestinians whom it suspects of taking part in riots last month.
- 31 March –
  - Two people are killed and 14 more injured as the Israel Defense Forces raid the city of Jenin in the West Bank in order to capture a suspect linked to Tuesday's shooting in Bnei Brak.
  - A Palestinian militant uses a screwdriver to stab and seriously injure an Israeli civilian on a bus in Neve Daniel, before being shot dead by another passenger.
  - Rock throwing causes a bus to crash into a car in Halhul, West Bank, injuring two people.
- 1 April – A Palestinian man is shot dead by Israeli security forces in Hebron.
- 2 April – Three Palestinian Islamic Jihad members are killed and four Israeli soldiers are injured during a gunfight near Jenin in the West Bank.
- 9 April – 2022 Tel Aviv shooting: Israeli soldiers raid the refugee camp in Jenin where the perpetrator of the Tel Aviv shooting that occurred on 7 April, lived. A Palestinian Islamic Jihad member is killed and 13 other people are injured. In retaliation for the Israeli raid, a group of around 100 Palestinian rioters vandalize Joseph's Tomb in Nablus. The gravestone and some other objects are damaged in the attack.
- 10 April –
  - The Israel Defence Forces perform a raid in the West Bank city of Jenin. Two brothers of dead Palestinian militant Raad Hazem are injured.
  - An Israel Border Police officer is injured in a stabbing attack at the entrance to the Cave of the Patriarchs in Hebron. The attacker is killed.
  - A Palestinian woman is killed in a confrontation with the Israel Defence Forces in Husan.
  - A man is killed after reportedly throwing a Molotov cocktail at Israeli forces in Al-Khader, Bethlehem Governorate.
- 11 April –
  - Two Israelis of the Breslover group are shot in Nablus after they attempted to enter through an unmanned checkpoint in order to pray at Joseph's Tomb. Fire damage is discovered inside several chambers of the tomb and is attributed to Palestinian rioters who were throwing stones at the tomb two days prior.
  - Five people are injured when their car is stoned in East Jerusalem.
  - A Palestinian militant is shot dead after throwing an incendiary device at Israeli security forces in the West Bank.
- 12 April – A police officer is stabbed and injured by a Palestinian militant in Ashkelon, Southern Israel. The attacker is shot dead.
- 13 April – The Israel Defense Forces raid the city of Nablus in the West Bank, killing one person and injuring 31 others.
- 15 April – More than 150 Palestinians and three Israeli police officers are injured after Israeli police stormed the Al-Aqsa Mosque in East Jerusalem. Hundreds of Palestinians across the Gaza Strip protest the storming.
- 18 April – Two Palestinians are seriously injured after being shot by Israeli security forces in the West Bank. The Israel Defense Forces say that the Palestinians were attacking Israeli troops.
- 19 April –
  - The Iron Dome intercepts a Hamas missile fired into Israel's Southern District from the Gaza Strip.
  - Israel fires missiles at a Hamas weapon depot in Gaza in response to the Hamas attack. No injuries are reported.
  - At least 40 Palestinians are injured after the IDF fires tear gas and rubber bullets at Palestinians protesting a march held by right-wing settlers near the former settlement of Homesh.
- 20 April – The Israel Defence Forces launches airstrikes on targets in the Gaza Strip in retaliation for a previous rocket attack launched from Gaza.
- 22 April –
  - At least 57 Palestinians are injured after Israeli police fire stun grenades and rubber bullets at a crowd of worshipers within the Al-Aqsa mosque compound in East Jerusalem, in response to stones and fireworks being thrown at Jewish worshipers.
  - Two rockets are launched into Israel from the Gaza Strip. One rocket lands in Sha'ar HaNegev and the other falls into the Beit Hanoun area, injuring one person.
- 27 April – An armed Palestinian teenager is killed and three more are injured as Israeli soldiers raid a refugee camp in Jenin in an operation to arrest suspects involved in prior terror attacks in Israel. Fifteen others are arrested during raids in other parts of the West Bank.
- 29 April – 2022 Al-Aqsa Mosque storming: Forty-two Palestinians are injured as the Israeli police storm the Al-Aqsa Mosque in Jerusalem in response to crowds within the mosque throwing rocks and fireworks in the direction of Jewish worshippers at the Western Wall.
- 30 April – Hamas warns that, if another attempt to storm the al-Aqsa Mosque is made by Israel, war could break out.
- 5 May – 2022 El'ad stabbing: Three people are killed and four others injured by two Palestinians in a mass stabbing in El'ad, Central Israel.
- 8 May – Two Palestinians are killed by Israeli soldiers during confrontations in the West Bank, while an Israeli policeman is stabbed and wounded in Jerusalem, hours after the perpetrators of the El'ad stabbing are arrested.
- 11 May –
  - Al Jazeera journalist Shireen Abu Akleh is killed while covering a raid in Jenin. Palestinian sources say that Abu Akleh was shot by Israeli soldiers, while Israeli sources say that she was likely killed by indiscriminate fire by Palestinian militants. Another journalist and two other Palestinians are injured in the shooting.
  - A Palestinian is shot dead after charging at police officers in Jerusalem.
- 13 May –
  - Israeli police commando Noam Raz is killed in a shootout with Palestinian Islamic Jihad gunmen in Jenin, West Bank.
  - Israeli riot police beat pallbearers and mourners at the funeral of journalist Shireen Abu Akleh, which was attended by thousands of Palestinians in East Jerusalem. White House Press Secretary Jen Psaki and the deputy speaker for UN Secretary-General António Guterres called the images of the attacks "deeply disturbing".
- 21 May – A 17-year-old member of the Palestinian Islamic Jihad is killed and another is injured during clashes with Israeli soldiers in Kafr Dan, Jenin Governorate.
- 24 May – An independent investigation by CNN, aided by a newly released video by fellow Al Jazeera correspondent, points to late journalist Shireen Abu Akleh having been deliberately targeted by IDF soldiers.
- 25 May – Clashes break out with the IDF after Palestinian rioters attack Joseph's Tomb in Nablus, West Bank. Fifteen Palestinians are injured and one teenager is killed.
- 1 June – A Palestinian man is killed and two others are injured after the IDF raided the town of Ya'bad to demolish the house of the perpetrator of the Bnei Brak shootings, following a confrontation by residents. A woman holding a knife is also shot and killed near the Al-Arroub refugee camp in the West Bank.
- 15 June – Mohammad El Halabi, a Palestinian aid worker at the center of an international controversy over his six-year detention in Israel, was convicted on the basis of 'secret evidence'.
- 17 June –
  - Israel intercepts a rocket fired by suspected Hamas militants over Ashkelon. The Israel Defense Forces respond by launching airstrikes on military targets in Gaza.
  - Three Palestinian militants, including an Izz ad-Din al-Qassam Brigades commander, are killed by Israeli soldiers during a raid in Jenin, West Bank.
- 19 June – A Palestinian man is shot and killed by Israeli forces while attempting to cross the separation barrier.
- 21 June – A Palestinian man is stabbed and killed by an Israeli settler in the West Bank.
- 25 June – A 16-year-old Palestinian teenager dies in Israeli custody after being shot yesterday by soldiers in Silwad, West Bank.
- 29 June – A Palestinian Islamic Jihad member is killed during clashes with Israeli soldiers in Jenin, West Bank.
- 30 June – Two Israeli civilians and a soldier are injured after Palestinian militants open fire inside Joseph's Tomb in Nablus.
- 16 July – Israel launches more than a dozen missiles against two Hamas targets in the Gaza Strip, following a number of rockets fired overnight from Gaza into Israel, causing severe damage. No casualties were reported and no civilian structures were targeted or hit.
- 24 July – Two Palestinian men are killed and 12 others are injured during a raid by Israeli soldiers in Nablus, West Bank.
- 29 July – A 16-year-old Palestinian affiliated with Fatah is killed during clashes with Israeli soldiers in Al-Mughayyir, near Ramallah.
- 5 August – Israel launches a series of airstrikes in the Gaza Strip, including a number against Palestinian Islamic Jihad's facilities. Ten people are killed and 55 others are wounded, including PIJ military leader Tayseer Jabari.
- 6 August – Operation Breaking Dawn: Israel launches airstrikes for the second day in the Gaza Strip, killing 14 people and injuring several others. Nineteen Palestinian Islamic Jihad members are also arrested in the West Bank.
- 9 August – !8 year-old Ibrahim al-Nabulsi, local head of the al-Aqsa Martyrs' Brigades, and two other people are killed during a raid by Israeli soldiers in Nablus. At least 40 others are injured.
- 14 August – A Palestinian gunman opens fire inside a bus in Jerusalem's Old City, injuring eight people, two of them critically. Israeli police later raid the Silwan neighborhood, where the suspect lived, and arrest him.
- 1 September – Two Palestinian men are killed in clashes with Israeli soldiers in the occupied West Bank. One of the men was killed by Palestinian gunfire, according to the Palestinian Health Ministry.
- 2 September – A Palestinian man stabs and injures an Israeli soldier near Kiryat Arba in the West Bank. The attacker is shot dead by security forces.
- 4 September –
  - Six Israeli soldiers and a civilian driver are injured when three gunmen open fire on a bus in Nablus, in the occupied West Bank. Two of the attackers are later arrested.
  - Hamas authorities execute five Palestinians in the first executions in Palestinian territories since 2017. Two of those executed were accused of espionage.
- 14 September – Two al-Aqsa Martyrs' Brigade members and an Israeli soldier are killed during a shootout at a checkpoint in Jenin, West Bank.
- 20 September – A civilian is killed and another is critically injured during clashes between Al-Qassam Brigades' supporters and Palestinian authorities outside a police station in Nablus, West Bank, following the arrest of two militants.
- 28 September – Israeli soldiers storm a refugee camp in Jenin, killing Palestinian terror suspect Abed Hazem, brother of Ra'ad Rezem who carried out the deadly 2022 Tel Aviv shooting. A member of the Palestinian Security Services and two other Palestinian militants are killed as well, leaving 44 others injured.
- 1 October – The death toll of Palestinian deaths in the West Bank reach 100, according to BBC News.
- 2 October – A taxi driver is injured after being shot by Palestinian militants near Elon Moreh in the West Bank. A demonstration by local Israeli settlers in protest at the incident is attacked with gunfire, injuring a soldier. A Palestinian group called The Lions' Den claims responsibility for the incident.
- 12 October – A Palestinian is killed near Hebron, Palestine during clashes with Israeli security forces after protests erupt across the West Bank.
- 13 October – 14 Palestinian factions sign a reconciliation agreement which includes a provision for holding presidential and parliamentary elections within one year of its signing.
- 14 October – Two Palestinians are killed and five more are wounded in exchanges of fire as Israeli soldiers raid Jenin, West Bank, to arrest Hamas operative suspected of involvement in shooting attacks.
- 25 October – Israeli soldiers raid a Lions' Den headquarter in Nablus, in the West Bank, killing three militants, including one of the group's founders. Two other Palestinians are also killed in nearby areas. Protests erupt in the town of Nabi Salih after the raid, resulting in a Palestinian man being killed by Israeli soldiers.
- 3 November – Four Palestinians are killed by Israeli security forces; one in East Jerusalem after stabbing a police officer and three during a raid in the West Bank.
- 9 November – A Palestinian teenager is killed and three others are injured in Nablus as clashes occur between Israeli soldiers and the Al-Aqsa Martyrs' Brigade at Joseph's Tomb when the latter allegedly opened fire on Jewish worshippers.
- 15 November – November 2022 Ariel attack: Three Israelis are killed and three are wounded when a Palestinian militant carries out a vehicle-ramming attack and mass stabbing in Ariel, West Bank.
- 17 November – 2022 Jabalia fire: a fire at a residential building killed 21 people in the Jabalia Refugee Camp in the Gaza Strip.
- 23 November – Two Palestinians are killed and three others injured during a raid by Israeli soldiers at a refugee camp in Nablus.
- 29 November – Three Palestinians are killed during clashes with Israeli forces; one in Hebron and two brothers in Kafr Ein. Eight others are injured. A man is also killed in Kokhav Ya'akov after ramming and injuring a woman. So far, this year is the deadliest in the conflict in the West Bank since 2006.
- 8 December – Three Palestinians are killed and two more injured during a raid by Israeli soldiers at a refugee camp in Jenin.
- 18 December – Israel deports French-Palestinian lawyer and activist Salah Hamouri saying that Hamouri continues to be active with the Popular Front for the Liberation of Palestine, which has been designated as a terrorist organization by Israel, the United States, European Union and other countries.

== Deaths ==
- 13 January – Wajeeh Qassim, 83, politician and diplomat, ambassador to Morocco (1988–2005).
- 2 February – Hanna Abu-Hanna, 93, poet and writer.
- 7 February – Jamal Al-Muhaisen, 72, politician, governor of Nablus Governorate (2007–2009).
- 9 February – Ziad Al-Zaza, 66, politician, COVID-19,
- 11 May – Shireen Abu Akleh, 51, journalist (Al Jazeera)
- 5 August – Tayseer Jabari, 50, Islamic militant, military leader of the Palestinian Islamic Jihad (since 2019)
- 3 November – Fatima Bernawi, 83, militant.
- 14 December – Salim Zanoun, 88, politician, chairman of the PNC (since 1993)
- 20 December – Nasser Abu Hamid, 50, prisoner (al-Aqsa Martyrs' Brigades)

== See also ==
- Timeline of the Israeli–Palestinian conflict in 2022
