= 2016 in Palestine =

- Decades: 1990s; 2000s; 2010s; 2020s
- See also: History of Palestine · Timeline of Palestinian history · List of years in Palestine

Events in the year 2016 in Palestine.

== Incumbents ==
State of Palestine (UN observer non-member State)

- Mahmoud Abbas (PLO), President, 8 May 2005–current
- Rami Hamdallah, Prime Minister, 6 June 2013–current
- Government of Palestine – 17th Government of Palestine

Gaza Strip (Hamas administration unrecognized by the United Nations)

- Ismail Haniyeh (Hamas), Prime Minister, 29 March 2006–current

== Events ==
- Ayman al-Aloul, Editor-in-Chief of Arab Now Agency in Gaza Strip, and another journalist, Ramzi Herzallah, were detained and allegedly tortured from 3–12 January by Hamas following critical Facebook posts.
- Israeli troops raided Birzeit University in Ramallah on 11 January, seizing unidentified materials belonging to Hamas.
- The Israeli military bombed a site near the border fence in Beit Lahiya, killing one and injuring three before they could set off an IED. While the Israeli government attributed the operation to its Air Force, Hamas accused the Israeli Navy of firing shells.

== See also ==
- 2016 in Israel
- Timeline of the Israeli–Palestinian conflict in 2016
