= 2013 in Palestine =

- Decades: 1990s; 2000s; 2010s; 2020s
- See also: History of Palestine · Timeline of Palestinian history · List of years in Palestine

Events in the year 2013 in Palestine.

== Incumbents ==
State of Palestine (UN observer non-member State)

- President – Mahmoud Abbas (PLO)
- Prime Minister – Salam Fayyad (Third Way) (emergency rule) until 6 June, Rami Hamdallah (Fatah) starting 6 June

- Prime Minister of the Palestinian National Authority (in the Gaza Strip) – Ismail Haniyeh (Hamas) (in rebellion against the Palestinian administration in Ramallah)

- Government of Palestine – 14th Government of Palestine (until 6 June), 15th Government of Palestine (from 6 June to 19 September), 16th Government of Palestine (starting 19 September)

== Events ==
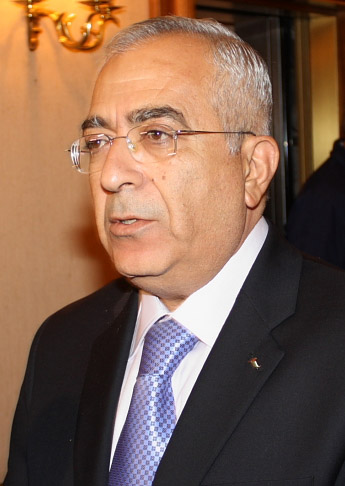
On April 13 Salam Fayyad resigned as Prime Minister of the Palestinian National Authority

=== January ===
- January 4 – Hundreds of thousands of people rally in Gaza in a show of unity between the governing Hamas and Fatah.
- January 6 – Mahmoud Abbas, the President of the Palestinian National Authority, orders that the words "State of Palestine" be used on official documents.

=== February ===
- February 26 – A rocket is fired from the Gaza Strip into Israel, marking the first such attack since a ceasefire was signed in November 2012.

=== March ===
- March 20 – President of the United States Barack Obama begins a four-day visit to Israel, the Palestinian territories and Jordan.

=== April ===
- April 2 – The Palestinian Islamic organization Hamas re-elects Khaled Meshaal as its leader. The group also passes a new law ordering gender segregation in Gaza's schools that will go into effect in September.
- April 13 – Salam Fayyad resigns as Prime Minister of the Palestinian National Authority following an ongoing dispute with the President Mahmoud Abbas.
- April 30 – An Israeli air strike on Gaza City kills Hitham Maskhal, a well known Palestinian militant and injures another in the first such attack since the November ceasefire. Both suspected Palestinian militants were part of the militant group which fired rockets at the southern Israeli city of Eilat two weeks ago.

=== June ===
- June 23 – Mahmoud Abbas, the President of the Palestinian National Authority, accepts the resignation of Prime Minister Rami Hamdallah who had offered his resignation on Thursday.

=== July ===
- July 28 – As a "good will gesture" to restart peace talks with the Palestinian Authority, Israel agreed to release 104 Palestinian prisoners, most of whom have been in jail since before the 1993 Oslo Accords.

=== August ===
- August 7 – Palestinian journalist Mohamed Muna is arrested and put in administrative detention.

=== November ===
- November 15 – Palestine celebrates the 25th anniversary of the Palestinian Declaration of Independence.

== Notable deaths ==
- January 29 – Said al-Muragha, 86, Palestinian militant (Fatah al-Intifada), cancer.
- February 23 – Thurayyā Malḥas, 88, Palestinian poet.
- March 17 – Umm Nidal, 64, Palestinian politician, multiple organ failure.
- April 2 – Maysara Abu Hamdiya, 64, Palestinian general, cancer.
- May 17 – Nasser al-Din al-Nashashibi, 93, Palestinian historian, author and journalist.

== See also ==
- 2013 in Israel
- Timeline of the Israeli–Palestinian conflict in 2013
