= 2019 in Palestine =

- Decades: 1990s; 2000s; 2010s; 2020s
- See also: History of Palestine · Timeline of Palestinian history · List of years in Palestine

Events in the year 2019 in Palestine.

== Incumbents ==
State of Palestine (UN observer non-member State)

- Mahmoud Abbas (PLO), President, 8 May 2005–current
- Rami Hamdallah, Prime Minister, 6 June 2013 – 13 April 2019
- Mohammad Shtayyeh, Prime Minister, 13 April 2019–current
- Government of Palestine – 17th Government of Palestine (until 13 April), 18th Government of Palestine (starting 13 April)

Gaza Strip (Hamas administration unrecognized by the United Nations)

- Yahya Sinwar (Hamas), Prime Minister, 13 February 2017–current

== Events ==
=== February ===
==== February 28 ====
Feminist Palestinian law-maker Khalida Jarrar is released after 20 months in Israeli custody. She had been put under administrative detention, incarceration without trial or charge. According to Jarrar, she does not know what she was arrested for.

=== March ===
==== March 11 ====
Oxford, UK and Ramallah become twin cities.

=== April ===
==== April 8 ====
A hunger strike among Palestinian prisoners protesting the conditions in Israeli jails begins. The number of hunger strikers reaches 400 over the next few days.

==== April 9 ====
Airbnb reverses its plan to delist homes in Israeli settlements in the occupied West Bank but promises to donate all profits from such properties to humanitarian aid organizations. Ben Jamal of the Palestine Solidarity Campaign calls the decision "frankly insulting".

==== April 19 ====
Israel demolishes two apartments in the Wadi al-Harya area in southern Hebron belonging to the Irfiya family. The demolitions are punishment for Palestinian prisoner Arafat Irfaiya, 19, who Israel accuses of having killed an Israeli settler in Jerusalem in February.

=== July ===
==== July 22 ====
Israel demolishes several Palestinian homes it says was built illegally and too close to the Israeli West Bank barrier in Sur Baher, a Palestinian neighborhood in East Jerusalem. The demolition displaces 17 Palestinians.

==== July 30 ====
The Socialist International consisting of 162 left-wing organizations and political parties convenes in Ramallah.

=== September ===
==== September 4 ====
Hundreds of Palestinians march in Ramallah, demanding protection against honor killings after Isra'a Ghrayeb, 22, was allegedly beaten to death by relatives on August 22.

==== September 11 ====
The Israeli army demolishes two Palestinian buildings under construction in Eizariya in East Jerusalem. According to the owner, the Israeli authorities claimed that they were built without permit and too close to the Israeli West Bank barrier.

==== September 15 ====
The Israeli government Israeli officially approves the establishment of the settlement Mevo'ot Yeriho north of Jericho, making it the sixth new authorized settlement since the Oslo accords.

==== September 25 ====
The Palestinian prisoners that began hunger striking in April reaches a deal with the Israel Prison Service (IPS). IPS agreed to remove jamming devices from cells and allow prisoners to call their relatives five days per week using public telephone.

=== October ===
==== October 24 ====
Rioting breaks out as Israeli forces demolish the family home of Islam Yousef Abu Hamid in Ramallah's al-Amari refugee camp for the second time. Abu Hamid is imprisoned in Israel for having killed Israeli soldier Ronen Lubarsky and the demolitions of his home was carried out as punishment.

=== November ===
==== November 12 ====
The European Court of Justice rules that Israeli products produced in the occupied West Bank must be labelled as such. They must not carry the generic "Made in Israel" tag.

Israeli forces demolish four Bedouin homes made of corrugated iron in the E1 zone east of Jerusalem in the West Bank.

=== December ===
==== December 11 ====
Israeli authorities arrest Palestinian journalist Bushra al-Tawil, 27, from Al-Bireh in the West Bank. On December 16, she is put in administrative detention - incarceration without charge.
