= 2017 in Palestine =

- Decades: 1990s; 2000s; 2010s; 2020s
- See also: History of Palestine · Timeline of Palestinian history · List of years in Palestine

Events in the year 2017 in Palestine.

== Incumbents ==
State of Palestine (UN observer non-member State)

- Mahmoud Abbas (PLO), President, 8 May 2005–current
- Rami Hamdallah, Prime Minister, 6 June 2013–current
- Government of Palestine – 17th Government of Palestine

Gaza Strip (Hamas administration unrecognized by the United Nations)

- Ismail Haniyeh (Hamas), Prime Minister, 29 March 2006–current

== Events ==
The Edward Said Public Library opened in Beit Lahia in the northern Gaza Strip.

=== November ===
==== November 1 ====
Israeli forces arrest journalist and prisoners' rights activist Bushra al-Tawil and sentences her to six months in administrative detention.

== Deaths ==
- 6 March – Bassel al-Araj, Palestinian activist and writer.(born 1984)

== See also ==
- 2017 in Israel
- List of violent incidents in the Israeli–Palestinian conflict, 2017
