= 2015 in Palestine =

- Decades: 1990s; 2000s; 2010s; 2020s
- See also: History of Palestine · Timeline of Palestinian history · List of years in Palestine

Events in the year 2015 in Palestine.

== Incumbents ==
State of Palestine (UN observer non-member State)

- Mahmoud Abbas (PLO), President, 8 May 2005–current
- Rami Hamdallah, Prime Minister, 6 June 2013–current
- Government of Palestine – 17th Government of Palestine

Gaza Strip (Hamas administration unrecognized by the United Nations)

- Ismail Haniyeh (Hamas), Prime Minister, 29 March 2006–current

== Events ==
For incidents of violence, see List of violent incidents in the Israeli–Palestinian conflict, 2015.

- January 1 - The Palestinian Authority signs a treaty to join and participate in the International Criminal Court.
- January 25 - Palestinian Authority Preventative Security officers arrest Bara al-Qadi, a 22-year-old undergraduate student at Birzeit University, for a social media post criticising Minister for Sport Jibril Rajoub. The arrest prompted criticism from Amnesty International.
- September 9 - Israel outlaws two grassroots Palestinian Islamist groups, "Mourabitoon" and "Mourabitaat", involved in aggressive protests at Temple Mount against stepped-up visits by religious Jews. This escalates tensions over the status of the Temple Mount and Jerusalem, leading to the 2015-2016 Palestinian unrest.
- September 10 - By a vote of 119 to 8, the United Nations General Assembly adopts a motion to fly the flag of United Nations General Assembly observers, presently including Palestine and the Holy See, at the UN Headquarters and offices.
- September 13 - Israeli police raids the al-Aqsa Mosque compound, with witnesses reporting that the police used rubber bullets and tear gas, and chained the doors of the mosque shut. There are numerous clashes around the site in the following days between Israeli police and Palestinian protestors.
- November 30 - The two Israeli minors involved in the kidnapping and murder of Mohammed Abu Khdeir are found guilty of murder by the Jerusalem district court.
- December 16 - Israeli human rights organisation B'Tselem releases a report listing twelve incidents in which Israeli soldiers and other security forces allegedly used excessive force against Palestinians, by shooting the assailants or suspected assailants even after they no longer posed any danger. B'Tselem accused Prime Minister Netanyahu of overseeing a "new pseudo-normative reality" in which a "shoot to kill" approach should always be adopted by police officers or armed civilians regarding suspected Palestinian assailants.
