= 2014 in Palestine =

- Decades: 1990s; 2000s; 2010s; 2020s
- See also: History of Palestine · Timeline of Palestinian history · List of years in Palestine

Events in the year 2014 in Palestine.

== Incumbents ==
State of Palestine (UN observer non-member State)

- Mahmoud Abbas (PLO), President, 8 May 2005–current
- Rami Hamdallah, Prime Minister, 6 June 2013–current
- Government of Palestine – 16th Government of Palestine (until 2 June), 17th Government of Palestine (starting 2 June)

Gaza Strip (Hamas administration unrecognized by the United Nations)

- Ismail Haniyeh (Hamas), Prime Minister, 29 March 2006–current

== Events ==
=== March ===
- 10 March - Death of Raed Zeiter takes place, with international attention given to the incident.

=== April ===
- 23 April – Signing of the Fatah–Hamas Gaza Agreement occurs, with elections to occur soon.

=== June ===
- 2 June – Palestinian unity government was formed.
- 12 June – Three Israeli teenagers were kidnapped and killed in the West Bank.

=== July ===
- 1 July - Palestinian journalist and prisoners' rights advocate Bushra al-Tawil is arrested by Israeli authorities and put in administrative detention.
- 2 July - Murder of Mohammed Abu Khdeir, followed by days of rioting in Shu'fat (East Jerusalem).
- 8 July - Operation Protective Edge begins, with the Israeli military sending soldiers into the Gaza Strip

== See also ==
- 2014 in Israel
- 2014 in Egypt
- Operation Protective Edge
- Timeline of the Israeli–Palestinian conflict in 2014
