= 2018 in Palestine =

- Decades: 1990s; 2000s; 2010s; 2020s
- See also: History of Palestine · Timeline of Palestinian history · List of years in Palestine

Events in the year 2018 in Palestine.

== Incumbents ==
State of Palestine (UN observer non-member State)

- President: Mahmoud Abbas (PLO)
- Prime Minister: Rami Hamdallah
- Government of Palestine – 17th Government of Palestine

Gaza Strip (Hamas administration unrecognized by the United Nations)

- Prime Minister: Yahya Sinwar (Hamas)

== Events ==
- 30 March - A series of weekly mass demonstrations in the Gaza Strip near the border with Israel are held, demanding that Palestinian refugees be allowed to return to lands that are now part of Israel. They also protested against Israel's crippling blockade of the Gaza Strip, as well as the United States recognizing Jerusalem as the Israeli capital. These protests, first organized by independent activists but later endorsed by Hamas, often devolved into clashes with Israeli security forces, in which 223 palestinians were killed and thousands more injured, whereas one Israeli soldier was killed and around 4 or 11 Israelis wounded. These demonstrations would continue until 27 December 2019.
- 30 May – United Nations warns that escalation in the Gaza Strip puts it on the "brink of war".
- 15 November – Palestine celebrates the 30th anniversary of the Palestinian Declaration of Independence.

== Deaths ==
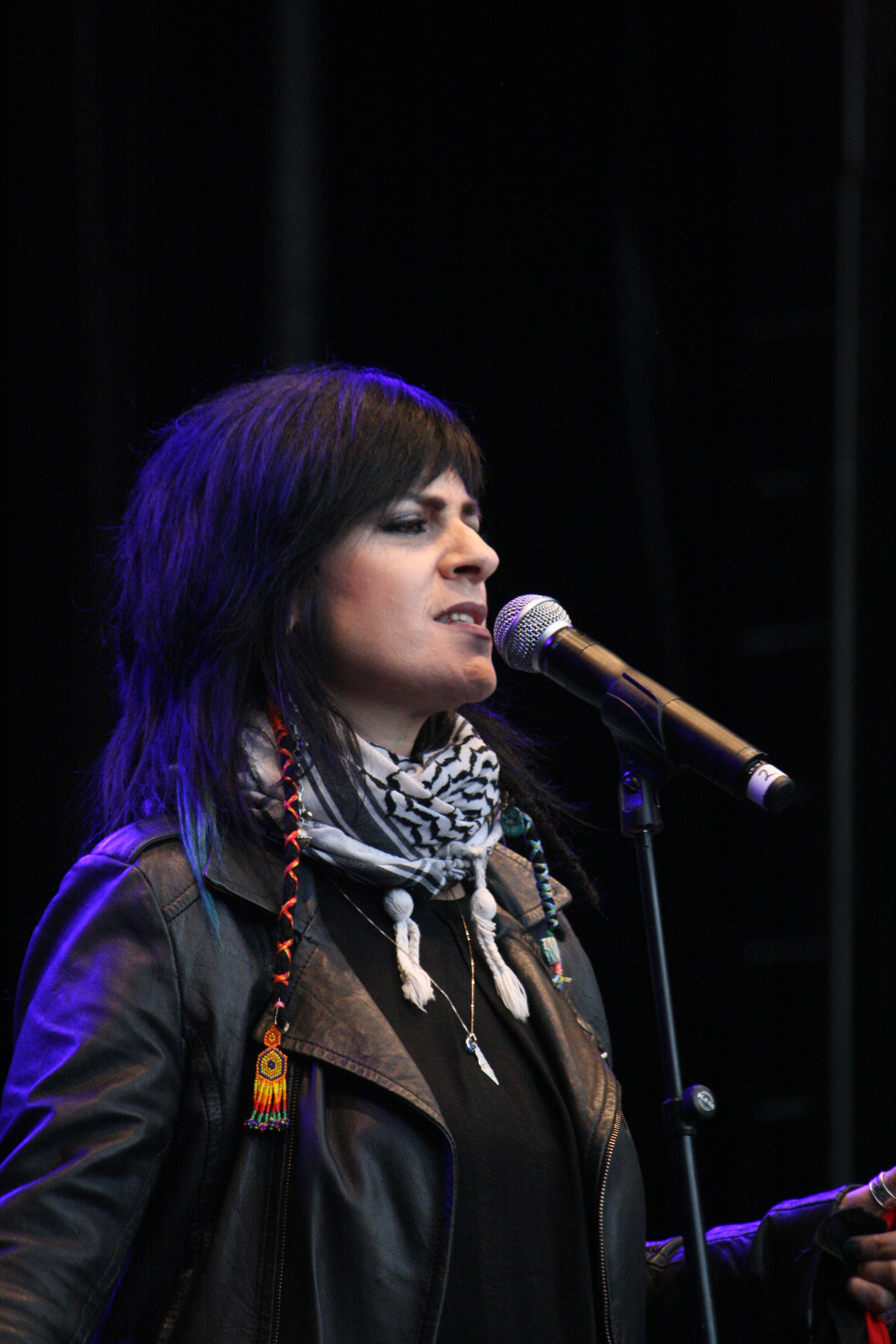
Rim Banna

- 25 January – Ghassan Shakaa, politician, former mayor of Nablus (b. 1943).
- 24 March – Rim Banna, singer, composer and activist (b. 1966)
- 21 April – Fadi Mohammad al-Batsh, engineer and academic (b. 1983)

== See also ==
- Timeline of the Israeli–Palestinian conflict in 2018
