= 2010 in Palestine =

- Decades: 1990s; 2000s; 2010s; 2020s
- See also: History of Palestine · Timeline of Palestinian history · List of years in Palestine

Events in the year 2010 in Palestine.

== Incumbents ==
Palestinian National Authority (non-state administrative authority)

- President – Mahmoud Abbas (PLO)
- Prime Minister –
  - Prime Minister of the Palestinian National Authority (in the West Bank) – Salam Fayyad (Third Way) (emergency rule)
  - Prime Minister of the Palestinian National Authority (in the Gaza Strip) – Ismail Haniyeh (Hamas) (in rebellion against the Palestinian National Authority)
- Government of Palestine – 13th Government of Palestine

== Events ==
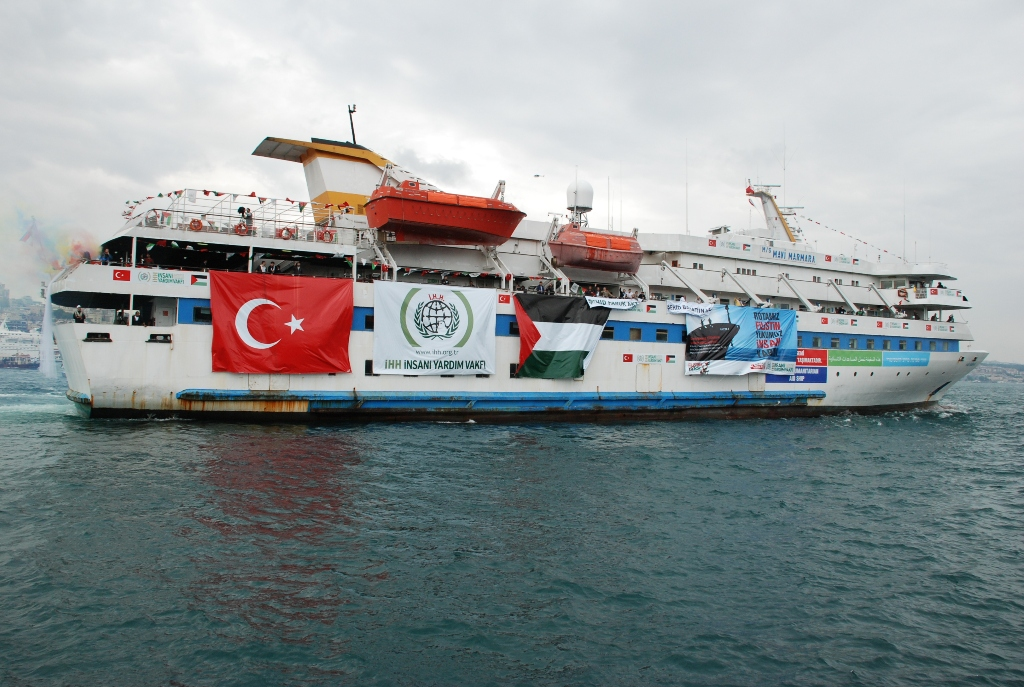
2010 Gaza flotilla raid – photo of the MV Mavi Marmara on which the violent clash erupted.

- January 19 – Assassination of Mahmoud Al-Mabhouh: The senior Hamas commander Mahmoud al-Mabhouh is assassinated in a Dubai hotel room. Al-Mabhouh was wanted by the Israeli government for the kidnapping and murder of two Israeli soldiers in 1989 as well as purchasing arms from Iran for use in Gaza; these have been cited as a possible motive for the assassination.
- February 1 – The Popular Resistance Committees (PRC), a Palestinian militant group in the Gaza Strip with close ties to Hamas, tries to carry out an attack on Israel by means of bombs placed in barrels and sent into the Mediterranean Sea from the Gaza coast.
- March 26 – A team of IDF soldiers from Golani Brigade, who cross the border into the Gaza Strip pursuing several people are seen placing explosive devices near the Israeli border fence, is ambushed and attacked with mortar shells and gunfire from inside the Strip. Two IDF soldiers are killed and three are injured. Hamas and Islamic Jihad claim responsibility for the attack.
- May 26 – Israel launches two night-time air strikes on the Gaza Strip in response to mortar attacks and the detonation of 200 kg of explosives laden on a donkey-cart next to the border fence.
- May 31 – Israeli naval forces raid and capture a flotilla of ships, organized by the Free Gaza Movement and the Turkish Foundation for Human Rights and Freedoms and Humanitarian Relief (IHH), which are attempting to break the Israeli and Egyptian blockade of Gaza. During the takeover, a violent confrontation erupts on board the largest ship of the flotilla. As a result, nine activists are killed and several dozen passengers and seven IDF soldiers are wounded.
- June 11 – A Palestinian attempts to run over two Israeli border policemen in the Jerusalem neighborhood of Wadi al-Joz, close to the Old City Walls. Other members of the border police force, who are at the scene, shoot and critically wound the driver as he tries to escape. The two policemen are lightly injured and receive medical treatment on the spot.
- June 14 – One Israeli policeman is killed and three policemen are injured when Palestinian militants open fire on their vehicle on Highway 60, south of Hebron.
- August 31 – Four Israelis, including a pregnant woman, are killed by Palestinian militants in a shooting in the West Bank next to Kiryat Arba, when a gunman opens fire on their car. Hamas claim responsibility for the attack.
- September 1 – Palestinian militants open fire on an Israeli car near Kochav HaShachar in the West Bank moderately injuring an Israeli man and lightly injuring an Israeli woman. Hamas has claimed responsibility for the attack.
- September 2 – 2010-11 direct talks: U.S. launches direct negotiations between Israel and The Palestinian Authority in Washington D.C, United States
- September 14 – A second round of Middle East peace talks between Israel and the Palestinian Authority concludes in Sharm el-Sheikh, Egypt.
- September 26 – The Israeli 10-month moratorium in construction of new settlement homes in the West Bank expires at 22.00 (GMT).

== Predicted and scheduled events ==
=== August – December ===
- September 25 – the Israeli 10-month moratorium in construction of new settlement homes in the West Bank would expire.

=== Unknown dates ===
- The construction of the West Bank barrier will be completed.

== Notable deaths ==
- January 12 – Hasib Sabbagh, 89, Palestinian businessman.
- January 19 – Mahmoud al-Mabhouh, 50, Palestinian leader of the Izz ad-Din al-Qassam Brigades, murdered.
- February 3 – Elazar ben Tsedaka ben Yitzhaq, 83, Samaritan High Priest.
- April 13 – Nahid al-Rayyis, 73, Palestinian politician and poet.
- April 17 – Abdul Rahman Ahmed Jibril Baroud, c.73, Palestinian poet, heart attack.
- July 3 – Abu Daoud, 73, Palestinian politician and military commander, planned 1972 Summer Olympics Munich massacre, kidney failure.
- August 17 – Amin al-Hindi, 70, Palestinian intelligence chief of the National Authority, pancreatic cancer.
- September 17 – Iyad Shilbayeh, 38, Palestinian Hamas member, shot.
- November 16 – Nimr al-Khatib, Palestinian political reader and author.(born 1918)

== See also ==
- Palestine at the 2010 Summer Youth Olympics
- 2010 in Israel
- 2007–present blockade of the Gaza Strip
- Timeline of the Israeli–Palestinian conflict in 2010
