= 2012 in Palestine =

- Decades: 1990s; 2000s; 2010s; 2020s
- See also: History of Palestine · Timeline of Palestinian history · List of years in Palestine

Events in the year 2012 in Palestine.

== Incumbents ==
Palestinian National Authority (non-state administrative authority)

- President – Mahmoud Abbas (PLO)
- Prime Minister –

- Prime Minister of the Palestinian National Authority (in the West Bank) – Salam Fayyad (Third Way) (emergency rule)
- Prime Minister of the Palestinian National Authority (in the Gaza Strip) – Ismail Haniyeh (Hamas) (in rebellion against the Palestinian National Authority)

- Government of Palestine – 13th Government of Palestine (until 16 May), 14th Government of Palestine (starting 16 May)

== Events ==
The UN General Assembly approves a motion granting Palestine non-member observer state status. UN observer state status voting results were: In favour Against Abstentions Absent Non-members

The most prominent events related to the Israeli–Palestinian conflict which occurred during 2012 include:

- January 3 – Negotiators from Israel and the Palestinian Authority meet in the Jordanian capital, Amman, for the first time in 16 months.
- January 25 – IDF forces capture the Speaker of the Hamas-dominated Palestinian Parliament Aziz Dweik near Ramallah, on charges of membership in an illegal organization. Following his capture, a military court in the Ofer Prison sentences him to six months in prison.
- March 9–16 – March 2012 Gaza-Israel clashes
  - March 9 – March 2012 Gaza-Israel clashes: Secretary-general of the Popular Resistance Committees Zuhir al-Qaisi, a senior PRC member and two additional Palestinian militants are assassinated during a targeted killing carried out by Israeli forces in Gaza. The Palestinian armed factions in the Gaza Strip, led by the Islamic Jihad and the Popular Resistance Committees, fired a massive number of rockets towards southern Israel in retaliation for three consecutive days. This would become the most serious escalation in the Gaza Strip since Operation Cast Lead.
- March 15 – A teenage Palestinian commits a stabbing attack on the Jerusalem Light Rail within Pisgat Ze’ev in Jerusalem, seriously wounding a 19-year-old female soldier before fleeing. The attacker was captured several hours later at the Kalandia north of Jerusalem while trying to flee back to Palestinian Authority-controlled territories.
- April 5 – A rocket fired from Egypt's Sinai desert hits the Israeli city of Eilat causing no injuries or property damage.
- June 6 – Hours after a bill to legalize settlement outposts is rejected, Israeli prime minister Benjamin Netanyahu orders the construction of 300 new homes at the Jewish settlement of Beit El in the West Bank.
- June 7 – An additional 550 settler homes are announced by Israeli construction minister Ariel Attias.
- June – Israeli transfer of Palestinian militant bodies: Israel hands over the bodies of 91 Palestinian suicide bombers and other militants as part of a goodwill gesture to PA chairman Mahmoud Abbas to help revive the peace talks and reinstate direct negotiations between Israel and the Palestinians.
- June 18 – a militant squad kill an Israeli construction worker and wound two of his colleagues in an attack carried out on the border between Israel and Egypt.
- June 23 – Palestinian militants fire rockets from the Gaza Strip into Israel severely injuring an elder. Israel launches a missile strike in return, killing two Palestinians.
- July 2 – Hamas suspends voter registration in the Gaza Strip, stalling Palestinian plans for parliamentary and presidential elections and thwarting moves towards reconciliation with the rival Fatah party.
- July 15 – Saudi Arabia states that it would donate $100 million to the Palestinian Authority.
- September 5 – A Palestinian Authority colonel is killed by gunfire from unknown assailants in Jenin, West Bank.
- November 14 – Operation Pillar of Defense: Hamas military chief Ahmed Jabari is killed in a targeted air strike carried out by the Israel Defense Forces and the Shin Bet.
- November 15 – Operation Pillar of Defense: Three Israeli civilians are killed in Kiryat Malachi, Israel, in a further barrage of rocket attacks on southern Israel from Palestinians in the Gaza Strip. Rockets have hit apartment buildings, schools and private houses so far.
- November 15 – Operation Pillar of Defense: Two rockets are fired from the Gaza Strip at Tel Aviv, with one landing in the sea and the other hitting an uninhabited area in the city's suburbs. Iranian backed Islamic Jihad has claimed responsibility for the incident, which was the first attack against the city since the 1991 Gulf War.
- November 16 – Operation Pillar of Defense: Palestinian militants fired a rocket aimed at Jerusalem setting off air raid sirens in the city.
- November 21 – Operation Pillar of Defense: A ceasefire between Israel and Hamas, announced by Egyptian Foreign Minister Mohamed Kamel Amr and US Secretary of State Hillary Clinton, comes into effect at 7:00 pm local time.
- November 29 – The 67th session of the United Nations General Assembly approves to upgrade Palestine's status from an "observer" to an "observer state", with 138 voting in favor, 9 against and 41 abstaining.
- December 8 – 25th anniversary of Hamas: The 25th anniversary of the founding of Hamas took place in the Palestinian territories. A rally involving at least 200,000 people was held in Gaza and various celebrations were conducted all over the Palestinian territories. Hamas leader Khaled Mashal arrived in Gaza for the first time ever to celebrate as well. In his speech, which Mashal gave at a mass rally attended by hundreds of thousands of supporters, he stated explicitly that the Palestinian people would never compromise with Israel's existence and that the organization will act decisively to gradually conquer and achieve full control over the territories which encompass both Israel and the Palestinian territories in order to establish one Islamic state in that area.

== Notable deaths ==
- March 9 – Zuhir al-Qaisi, Palestinian militant leader, Secretary General of the Popular Resistance Committees (since 2011), air strike.
- July 6 – Hani al-Hassan, 74, Palestinian politician and diplomat, complications of a stroke.
- August 29 – Said Aburish, 77, Palestinian journalist.
- October 13 – Hisham Al-Saedni, 43, Palestinian militant, air strike.
- November 14 – Ahmed Jabari, 52, Palestinian militant leader (Hamas), airstrike.

== See also ==
- 2012 in Israel
- Timeline of the Israeli–Palestinian conflict in 2012
