= 2011 in Palestine =

- Decades: 1990s; 2000s; 2010s; 2020s
- See also: History of Palestine · Timeline of Palestinian history · List of years in Palestine

Events in the year 2011 in Palestine.

== Incumbents ==
Palestinian National Authority (non-state administrative authority)

- President – Mahmoud Abbas (PLO)
- Prime Minister –
  - Prime Minister of the Palestinian National Authority (in the West Bank) – Salam Fayyad (Third Way) (emergency rule)
  - Prime Minister of the Palestinian National Authority (in the Gaza Strip) – Ismail Haniyeh (Hamas) (in rebellion against the Palestinian National Authority)
- Government of Palestine – 13th Government of Palestine

== Events ==
- January 2 – Israel extends a six-month ban on the immigration of Palestinian Arabs married to Israelis.
- January 3 – Israel Air Force planes bomb three targets, including two refugee camps and a weapons factory in the Gaza Strip, Palestine, injuring two people in response to the firing of a Kassam rocket from the Gaza Strip into southern Israel.
- January 6 – Israeli troops kill two Palestinians as they attempted to cross a border fence from the Gaza Strip.
- January 7 – Chile recognizes the State of Palestine.
- January 10 – The Palestinian Authority states it will seek United Nations recognition through both the Security Council and the General Assembly in September. It is currently lobbying nations for recognition during the stalled peace talks with Israel.
- January 11 – An Israeli missile attack kills a Palestinian militant while he was riding a motorcycle in the Gaza Strip.
- January 14 – Guyana formally recognizes Palestine as an independent state.
- January 18 – President of Russia Dmitry Medvedev, on his first visit to the West Bank as head of state, confirms "support [for] the inalienable right of the Palestinian people to an independent state with its capital in East Jerusalem."
- January 23 – The Palestine Papers: thousands of confidential documents relating to diplomatic correspondence detailing the inner workings of the Israeli-Palestinian peace process, are exposed by the Al-Jazeera news network. Following this, the Palestinian Authority condemns Al-Jazeera for releasing the documents and denies that the Palestinian Authority had agreed to make far-reaching concessions on Jerusalem as the documents purportedly reveal.
- January 24 – Peru recognizes Palestine "as a free and sovereign state".
- February 17 – Israeli troops kill three Palestinian militants near Beit Lahia, in the northern Gaza Strip, who were approaching the border apparently in an attempt to plant a bomb; the Democratic Front for the Liberation of Palestine identified one of the men as a member of the group and said he had been killed "during a mission carried out by our military wing."
- February 19 – The U.S. vetoes a draft of a U.N. Security Council resolution which was critical of Israeli settlements in the West Bank. The resolution was supported by all other council members and co-sponsored by almost 120 nations. This veto resolution is the ninth U.N. resolution on the Israel-Palestine conflict to be vetoed by the U.S. since 2000.
- March 12 – Itamar attack: Two Palestinian teens armed with knives infiltrated the West Bank settlement of Itamar and stabbed to death five Israeli family members, including the parents and three of their children, aged 11, 3 and a month old infant.
- March 15 – The Israeli Navy intercepts the cargo ship "Victoria" which was carrying a long list of advanced weapons that were smuggled from Iran and were allegedly bound for the militant organizations operating in the Gaza Strip.
- March 16 – The Israeli Air Force attacks a training site of the Palestinian militant group Al Qassam brigades in the southern part of Gaza city in response to a rocket launched from the Gaza Strip at the Israeli southern communities in the Sdot Negev Regional Council in the southern district of Israel. Palestinians reported that three people were killed in the attack and three were wounded.
- April 4 – Israeli/Palestinian actor and peace activist Juliano Mer-Khamis, of both Jewish and Christian Arab origin, is gunned down in Jenin by masked militants.
- April 7 – 2011 Israeli school bus anti-tank missile attack: An anti-tank missile fired from the Gaza Strip hits a school bus, moderately wounding the bus driver, and critically injuring a 16-year boy who later died of his wounds.
- April 15 – Italian reporter, writer and pro-Palestinian activist, Vittorio Arrigoni, is kidnapped and murdered in Gaza by militants.
- April 27 – Rival Palestinian factions Hamas and Fatah sign a unity deal, calling for the foundation of a single government in the Gaza Strip and Palestinian Authority-controlled areas of the West Bank, presidential and legislative elections in a year, and the release of prisoners.
- July – Freedom Flotilla II
  - July 19 – The French-flagged yacht Dignité Al Karama, which was to have been part of the Freedom Flotilla II, is Illegally intercepted and boarded by Israeli commandos, off the coast of Gaza, and escorted to the Port of Ashdod.
- August 18 – Eight people were killed and dozens are injured in southern Israel after a string of terrorist attacks on a highway targeting two civilian buses and cars as well a military bus responding to the attacks. No organization took responsibility for the attacks. Nevertheless, the Israeli security establishment blamed The Popular Resistance Committees (PRC) in Gaza for carrying out the attacks and in retaliation, Israel launched an air raid on the town of Rafah in which six Palestinians militants from the Popular Resistance Committee were killed, among them Abu Oud al-Nirab, the commander of the organization's military wing and Khaled Shaath, a senior in the organization.
- September 23 – During the opening of the General Assembly of the United Nations, the President of the Palestinian National Authority Mahmoud Abbas makes a bid for a UN recognition in a unilateral declaration of a Palestinian state which would exist in the Gaza Strip, the West Bank and have the East Jerusalem as its capital.

== Notable deaths ==
- April 4 – Juliano Mer-Khamis, 52, Israeli actor, director, filmmaker and political activist of Jewish and Arab origin, murdered in Jenin.
- April 15 – Vittorio Arrigoni, 36, Italian reporter, writer and political activist, murdered in Gaza.
- August 18 – Immad Hammad, 39, Palestinian deputy, air strike.
- December 10 – Mustafa Tamimi, 28, Palestinian protester, killed in Nabi Saleh

== See also ==
- 2011 in Israel
- 2007–present blockade of the Gaza Strip
- List of Palestinian rocket attacks on Israel in 2011
- List of violent incidents in the Israeli–Palestinian conflict in 2011
