= 2020 in Palestine =

- Decades: 2000s; 2010s; 2020s
- See also: History of Palestine; Timeline of Palestinian history; List of years in Palestine

Events in the year 2020 in Palestine.

== Incumbents ==
State of Palestine (UN observer non-member State)

- President (PLO): Mahmoud Abbas
- Prime Minister: Mohammad Shtayyeh
- Government of Palestine – Eighteenth government of Palestine

== Events ==
For incidents of violence, see List of violent incidents in the Israeli–Palestinian conflict, 2020. For events relating to the COVID-19 pandemic, see COVID-19 pandemic in the State of Palestine.

=== February ===
- February 10 – An Israeli court sentences leader of the Northern Branch of the Islamic Movement in Israel, Sheikh Raed Salah, to 28 months in prison for incitement over comments he made at a funeral in 2017.
- February 20 – Israel's Prime Minister Benjamin Netanyahu greenlights the construction of 2,200 units in the Har Homa settlement in East Jerusalem. He estimates that the population of the settlement would increase from 40,000 to 50,000 settlers. Palestinian President Mahmoud Abbas criticizes the plan. Netanyahu also announced the addition of 3,000 homes to the Givat HaMatos settlement and 1,000 to the Palestinian neighborhood Beit Safafa.

=== March ===
- March 5 – In response to the COVID-19 pandemic, the Palestinian government announces a complete ban on the entry of foreign tourists and declares a state of emergency in the West Bank. Schools, universities, mosques and churches are closed for one month.
- March 21 – The first two cases of COVID-19 in Gaza City, Gaza, are diagnosed.

=== May ===
- May 22 – Palestinian President Mahmoud Abbas announces that security coordination with Israel has been halted, in response to Benjamin Netanyahu's controversial plan to annex parts of the occupied West Bank.
- May 30 – Eyad al-Hallaq, a 32-year-old autistic Palestinian man, was shot and killed by Israeli Police after failing to stop at the Lions' Gate checkpoint in Jerusalem after being ordered to do so by officers stationed nearby.

=== June ===
- June 3 – The IDF demolishes eleven Palestinian homes in Masafer Yatta, south of Hebron, due to the lack of proper building permits. In a separate incident, eight homes in the Ein Hajla Bedouin community east of Jericho are demolished by the IDF.
- June 18 – Local sporting events, such as equestrianism, resume in the Gaza Strip. With soccer, competitions will be played to empty audiences starting the next day.

=== July ===
- July 23 – Israeli authorities release Hamas co-founder Hassan Yousef who was held in administrative detention since April 2, 2019.
- July 30
  - Israeli soldiers arrest Mahmoud Nawajaa, the General Coordinator of the Palestinian BDS National Committee, in his home near Ramallah.
  - The Israeli military hands out 36 demolition orders for all standing structures in the village of Farasin, west of Jenin, in the northern West Bank. If the demolitions are carried out, they would displace 200 Palestinians according to local sources.

=== August ===
- August 4 – The Israeli Magistrate Court in Jerusalem orders Adnan Ghaith, the governor for Quds Governorate, to be released. He was arrested by Israeli authorities on July 19 on suspicion of "planning an act of terrorism".
- August 5
  - Israeli bulldozers raze tracts of land in Dura, southwest of Hebron. Local sources suspect that it may have been done to make way for expansion of the nearby Israeli Negohot settlement.
  - In Israel's Huwara jail, 30 Palestinians begin a hunger strike in protest against maltreatment and neglect by the Israel Prison Service.
  - Israeli soldiers demolish three homes in Silwan in East Jerusalem, while in Beit Hanina, a Palestinian was forced to demolish his home. According to Israeli authorities, the structures lacked building permits.
  - The Israeli Central Court rules that 11,500 dunams (11.5 km^{2}) in Al-Sawahreh south-east of Jerusalem belongs to the families Al-Araj and Khalayleh. The families had been embroiled in a legal battle with a suspected forger since 2008.
- August 6
  - The World Bank grants Palestine $30 million in aid to fight the COVID-19 pandemic.
  - Palestine reports that a 15-year-old Palestinian boy held in Shikma Prison in Ashkelon, Israel, has tested positive for COVID-19. The boy was arrested on July 23 in his home in Al Jalazoun refugee camp, north of Ramallah.
- August 7
  - The Palestinian Colonisation and Wall Resistance Commission releases its report for the first half of 2020. The report claims that Israeli authorities had demolished 313 homes and issued 129 eviction notices in Palestinian. It also reports that there were 419 attacks made by Jewish settlers which injured 78 Palestinians, and damaged 1,100 dunums of land and 78 vehicles.
  - Amnesty International calls for Israeli authorities to immediately release human rights defender and General Coordinator of the BDS movement Mahmoud Nawajaa, who they label as a prisoner of conscience.
- August 10
  - According to local sources, Israeli forces demolished a home and well in Farasin, west of Jenin, and a home in Beit Iskaria, south of Bethlehem.
  - Two Palestinians, Ibrahim Sabia and Khaled Abu-Taa, tears down their own homes in Sheikh Jarrah in Jerusalem as they were built without a permit. By demolishing the homes themselves they avoid paying the fee that Israel charges for carrying out demolitions.
- August 11
  - Israeli forces tears down two residential tents in Masafer Yatta in the southern West Bank, displacing at least 10 persons according to local activist Fouad al-Imour.
  - Israeli forces tears down a three-apartment building belonging to the Tahhan family in Silwan in East Jerusalem built without a permit. According to members of the family, they had applied several times for a permit but were denied one. Over 25 persons were displaced.
  - Egypt opens the Rafah Border Crossing for the first time in five months. Only Palestinians holding foreign passports, foreign residency permits or having emergency medical needs are allowed to cross. The crossing is due to stay open for three days. People returning to Gaza are required to stay for three weeks in a dedicated quarantine facility due to the COVID-19 pandemic.
- August 13
  - Several Palestinian organizations criticize the United Arab Emirates in response to it signing a peace agreement with Israel. Hamas calls it "a treacherous stab in the back of the Palestinian people," and Hanan Ashrawi of the PLO Executive Committee states that Israel "got rewarded for not declaring openly what it has been doing to Palestine illegally and persistently since the beginning of the occupation." The UAE "has come out in the open on its secret dealings/normalization with Israel," she says. "Please don’t do us a favor. We are nobody’s fig leaf!" The Palestinian Authority recalls its ambassador to the UAE.
- August 16 – Israel bans Jerusalem's governor Adnan Ghaith from entering the West Bank for six months.
- August 17
  - An Israeli military court releases Mahmoud Nawajaa, General Coordinator of the BDS movement, after having detained him for 19 days. Upon his release, Nawajaa comments: "The Israeli occupation and the settler-colonial apartheid regime arrested me to obstruct the BDS movement, distort its image and intimidate its activists."
- August 23
  - Israel bans all imports to the Gaza strip except food and medical supplies. The ban is part of Israel's punitive actions against Gaza. Over the last two weeks balloons and rockets have been launched from the enclave and Israel has retaliated by bombing it.
  - Israeli forces demolishes several structures in al-Issawiya in East Jerusalem, according to local sources. They were owned by Mohammad Abd Muheisen who the Israeli authorities claimed had built them without Israeli permits.
- August 25 – The first case of COVID-19 is detected in the general population in Gaza. Hamas imposes a 48-hour curfew to contain the spread of the virus.
- August 26 – Two Palestinian brothers, Bilal and Mohammad Dabash, demolishes their own houses in Sur Baher southeast of Jerusalem in order to avoid having to pay fines that the Israeli municipality would have levied for carrying out the demolitions of the houses. The demolitions displaced 11 persons.
- August 29 – Gunmen celebrating a wedding by shooting in the air injure two sisters on a balcony in Am'ari refugee camp near Ramallah in the central West Bank. One sister is taken to a hospital where she is pronounced dead on arrival.

=== September ===
- September 8 – Netanyahu apologizes to the family of Yaqoub Abu al-Qi'an, a Bedouin schoolteacher killed by Israeli police on January 18, 2017 and then falsely accused of being an ISIS terrorist.
- September 10 – Germany pledges to allocate 17 million Euros to Palestine through UNDP to fight the COVID-19 pandemic.
- September 13
  - Israel approves the construction of 980 new settlement units in the Efrat settlement south of Bethlehem, according to a local activist.
- September 22 – Palestine quits its current chairmanship of Arab League meetings in protest over the UAE and Bahrain's normalization of ties with Israel.
- September 24 – Fatah and Hamas announce an agreement to hold elections within six months, for the first time since 2006.

=== October ===
- October 21 – A pregnant 24-year-old woman is found dead in her home in Nabi Elias in the northern West Bank. According to local sources, her husband was detained for the suspected murder.

=== November ===
- November 6 – 73 Palestinians, including 41 children are displaced after the Palestinian Bedouin village of Khirbet Humsa al-Fawqa is razed in the largest demolition in years. Palestinian Prime Minister Mohammad Shtayyeh accused Israel of timing the demolition for election day in the United States, when the world was distracted.
- November 9 – The United Nations Relief and Works Agency for Palestine Refugees (UNRWA) runs out of money. Its 28,000 staff will be forced to take pay cuts.

== Deaths ==
- January 27 – Mohammad Zuhdi Nashashibi, former Finance Minister (b. 1925).
- March 18 – Al Tayeb Abdul Rahim, politician (b. 1944).
- May 9 – Ahmad Kurd, former mayor of Deir al-Balah.
- June 6 – Ramadan Shalah, former leader of Islamic Jihad Movement in Palestine (b. 1958).
- November 10 – Saeb Erekat, politician (b. 1955).
