= 2021 in Palestine =

- Decades: 2000s; 2010s; 2020s
- See also: History of Palestine; Timeline of Palestinian history; List of years in Palestine

Events in the year 2021 in Palestine.

== Incumbents ==
State of Palestine (UN observer non-member State)

- President (PLO): Mahmoud Abbas
- Prime Minister: Mohammad Shtayyeh
- Government of Palestine – Eighteenth government of Palestine

== Events ==
Ongoing — COVID-19 pandemic in the State of Palestine

- 4 February - Israel razed Khirbet Humsa al-Fawqa for the second time because of what it claimed was an illegal settlement next to a military firing range. The Israeli rights group B'Tselem called the demolition "unusually broad," accusing Israel of seeking "to forcibly transfer Palestinian communities in order to take over their land."
- 23 April - More than 100 people are injured after clashes in East Jerusalem.
- 27 April - Palestinian National Authority President Mahmoud Abbas decided to postpone the 2021 Palestinian parliamentary elections.
- 6 May
  - Dozens of Israeli settlers attacked a Palestinian village in West Bank in response to the drive-by shooting of three Israelis days prior.
  - Multiple Palestinian factions including members from Hamas rejected President Mahmoud Abbas' decision to postpone the 2021 Palestinian parliamentary elections.
- 7 May - At least 200 Palestinians and 6 Israeli police officers are injured following clashes in the Al-Aqsa Mosque compound after reports of Israel's intention to evict Palestinians from land claimed by Jewish settlers.
- 8 May - Second night of clashes in Al-Aqsa Mosque injures 100 Palestinians.
- 9 May
  - Clashes intensify after protests spread across major cities in Israel and Palestinian territories.
  - Israeli forces storm Al-Aqsa mosque, injuring more than 300 Palestinians.
- 10 May
  - Hamas launches more than 100 rockets into Jerusalem in retaliation to the storming of Al-Aqsa by Israeli forces a day prior.
  - IDF launches missile attack on Gaza Strip, killing 20 people including 9 children.
- 11 May
  - Hamas launches another 130 barrage of rockets to Israel.
  - A total of 28 Palestinians have been killed since the start of the worsening crisis between Palestine and Israel.
- 7 July - Khirbet Humsa al-Fawqa was demolished by Israel again for at least the third time.
- 6 September - Six Palestinian prisoners escape from Gilboa Prison, a maximum security prison in northern Israel.
- 10 September - Palestinians hold rallies across West Bank following calls from Hamas and other Palestinian factions to hold "day of rage" in solidarity with the escaped Gilboa prisoners.
- 20 October - A Palestinian woman is held in detention and prevented from breastfeeding her baby by Israeli police officers.
- 11 December - 2021 Palestinian local elections
- 23 December - Some 125 Palestinian civilians sustained light to moderate injuries during clashes with the Israel Defense Forces, which erupted shortly after hundreds of Israeli settlers protected by the army attempted to break into and attack the village of Burqa, according to medical sources. The Palestinian Red Crescent (PRC) told that 42 Palestinians, including a journalist, were injured after being hit with rubber-coated steel rounds, while another 83 sustained suffocation from inhalation of teargas fired by the Israeli army. PRC added that a girl was treated for shock after a group of violent Israeli settlers attacked her family's home on the outskirts of the village.

== Deaths ==
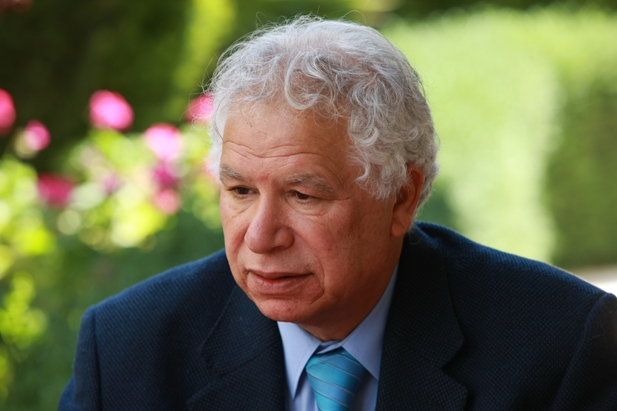
Mourid Barghouti

- 1 February – Abd al-Sattar Qasim, writer (born 1948).
- 2 February – Naim Attallah, Palestinian-born British book publisher (born 1931).
- 14 February – Mourid Barghouti, poet and writer (born 1944).
- 5 May - Izz al-Din Manasirah, poet, critic, intellectual and academic (born 1946).
- 17 July - Mohammed Milhim, politician (born 1929).

== See also ==
- Timeline of the Israeli–Palestinian conflict in 2021
