= Timeline of the Israeli–Palestinian conflict in 2021 =

The following is a timeline of events during the Israeli–Palestinian conflict in 2021, including the 2021 Israel–Palestine crisis.

== February ==
=== February 4 ===
Israel razed Khirbet Humsa al-Fawqa for the second time because of what it claimed was an illegal settlement next to a military firing range. The Israeli rights group B'Tselem called the demolition "unusually broad," accusing Israel of seeking "to forcibly transfer Palestinian communities in order to take over their land."

== April ==
Clashes occur throughout April in the Sheikh Jarrah neighborhood of Jerusalem where dozens of Palestinian families are threatened with eviction due to the long-running Sheikh Jarrah property dispute.

== May ==
=== May 2 ===
2021 Tapuah Junction shooting: Muntasir Shalabi, a Palestinian-American dual citizen opened fire in a drive-by shooting in the Tapuach Junction in the West Bank, killing a 19 years old Yeshiva student named Yehuda Guetta, seriously injured a second teenager and lightly wounded a third.

=== May 5 ===
Negotiations to form a new Israeli government under Benjamin Netanyahu fail and Yair Lapid of the centrist Yesh Atid party is asked by President Reuven Rivlin to try form a government.

=== May 6 ===
The rising tensions in the West Bank and East Jerusalem in recent weeks were confirmed as two Palestinians were killed in clashes with the Israel Defense Forces.

=== May 7 ===
On 7 May, large numbers of police were deployed on the Temple Mount as around 70,000 worshippers attended the final Friday prayers of Ramadan at Masjid Al-Aqsa. After the evening prayers, some Palestinian worshippers began throwing previously stockpiled rocks and other objects at Israeli police officers. Police officers fired stun grenades into the mosque compound, and into a field clinic.

=== May 8 ===
More clashes occurred on 8 May, the date of the Islamic holy night of Laylat al-Qadr. Palestinian crowds threw stones, lit fires, and chanted "Strike Tel Aviv" and "In spirit and in blood, we will redeem al-Aqsa", which The Times of Israel described as in support of Hamas. The Israel Police, wearing riot gear and some on horseback, used stun grenades and water cannons. At least 80 people were injured.

=== May 10 ===
A mosque spokesman stated that major clashes broke out after Israeli police attempted to evacuate the compound, where many Palestinians sleep over in Ramadan, adding that the evacuation was intended to allow access to Israelis. More than 300 Palestinians were wounded as Israeli police stormed the mosque compound. Palestinians threw rocks, firecrackers, and heavy objects, while Israeli police fired stun grenades, tear gas, and rubber bullets at worshippers. The storming came ahead of a Jerusalem Day flag march by Jewish nationalists through the Old City. At least 215 Palestinians were injured, 153 of whom were hospitalised. Militants in Gaza fired rockets into Israel the following night.

The same day, a video showing a raging fire on the al-Haram al-Sharif, caused by the conflagration of a tree near the Al-Aqsa mosque, began to circulate on social media. Below in the Western plaza, a packed group of Jewish Israelis chanted what Yair Wallach called "genocidal songs of vengeance" while cheering the flames with words from a song from Judges 16:28 in which Samson cries out before he tears down the pillars in Gaza, "O God, that I may with one blow take vengeance on the Philistines for my two eyes!"

=== May 11 ===
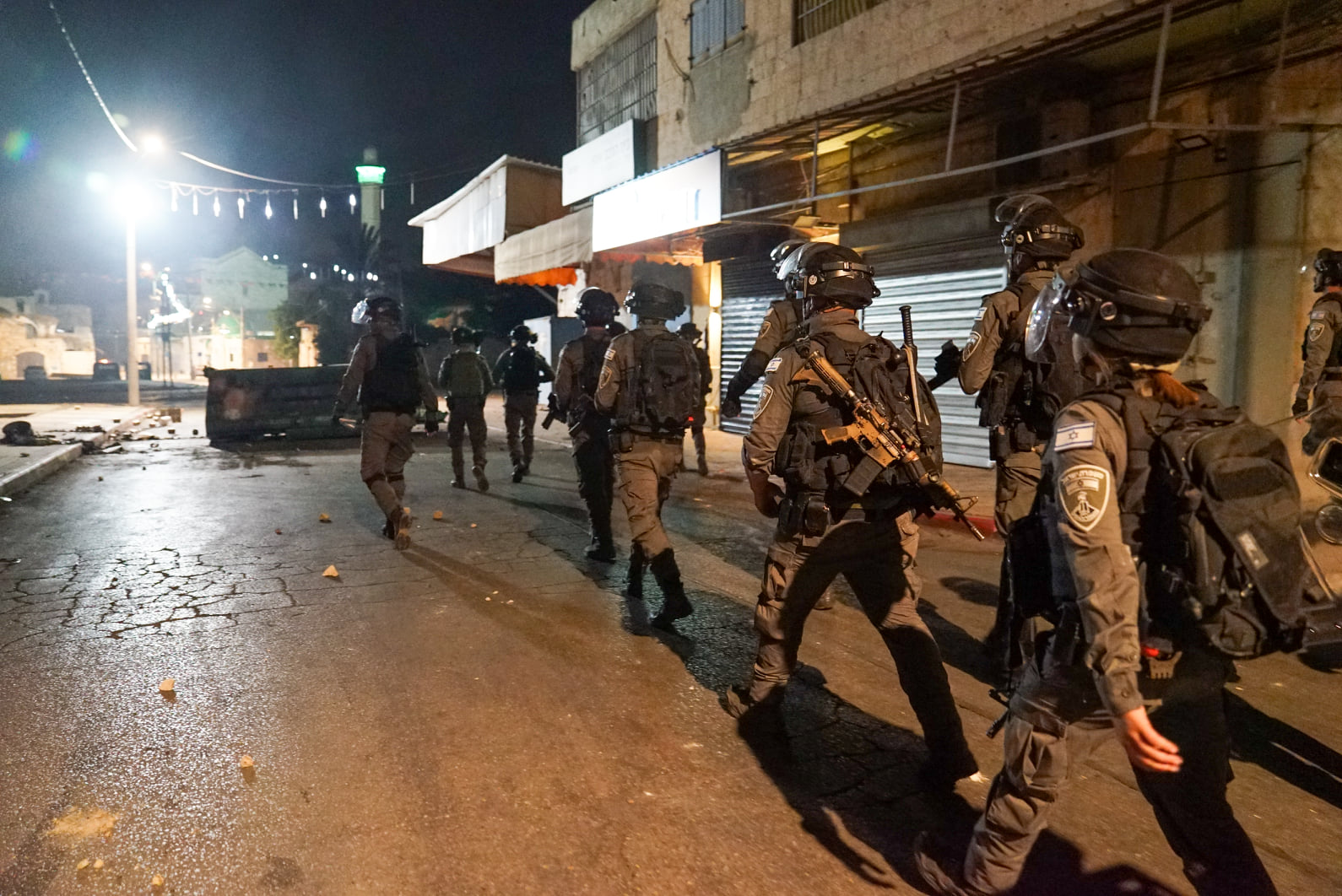
Israeli police officers in Lod, Israel, 11 May

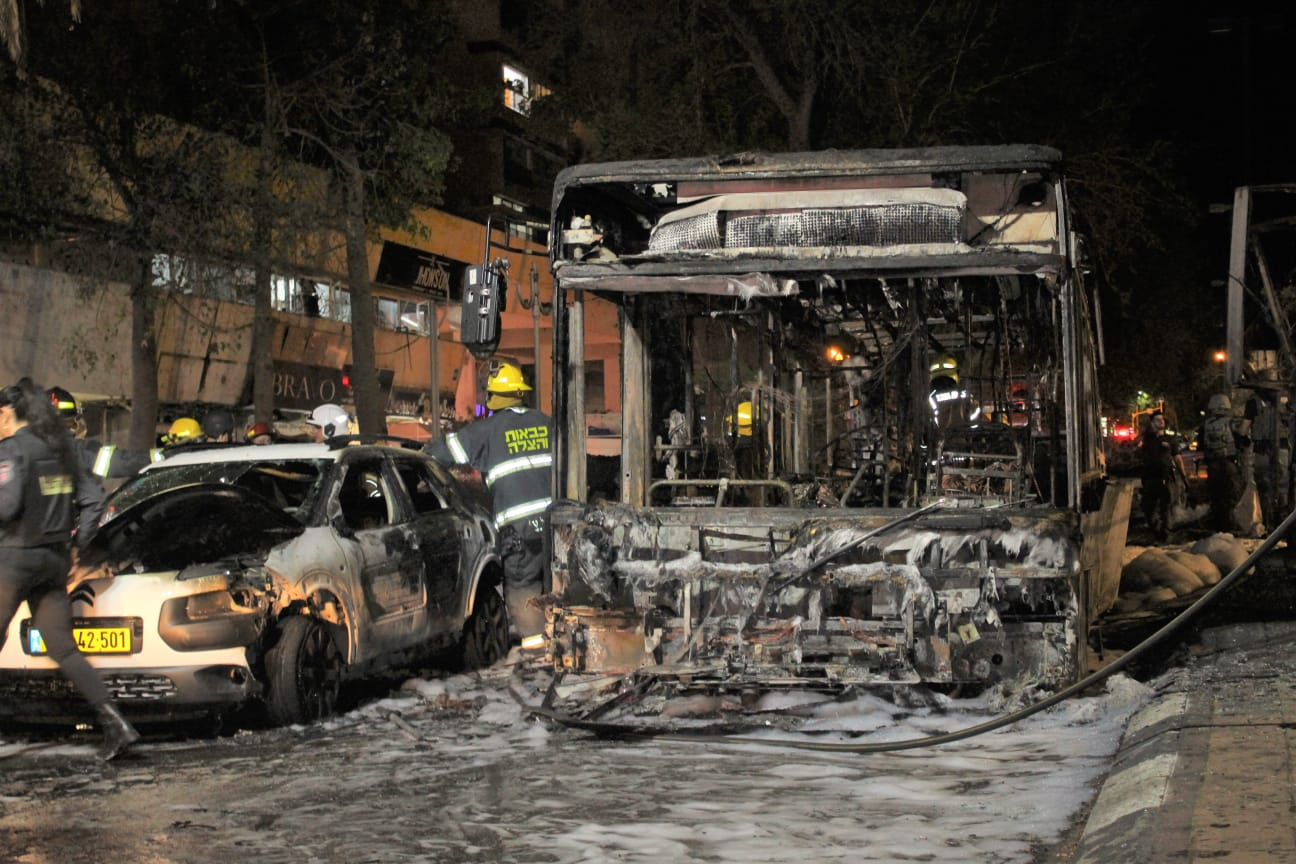
A bus and a car burnt out after a rocket hit in Holon.

Widespread protests and riots intensified across Israel, particularly in cities with a large Arab population. the Mayor of Lod Yair Revivio urged Prime Minister of Israel Benjamin Netanyahu to deploy Israel Border Police units to help quell the violence that saw the burning of three synagogues and dozens of cars in the city, saying that the city had "completely lost control" and describing it as "near civil war". Netanyahu declared a state of emergency in Lod, marking the first time since 1966 that Israel had used emergency powers over an Arab community. Minister of Public Security Amir Ohana has implemented the emergency orders.

On 11 May, the 13-story residential Hanadi Tower in Gaza collapsed after being hit by an Israeli airstrike. The tower housed a mix of residential apartments and commercial offices. IDF said the building contained offices used by Hamas, and said it gave "advance warning to civilians in the building and provided sufficient time for them to evacuate the site"; Hamas and Palestinian Islamic Jihad fired 137 rockets at Tel Aviv in five minutes. Hamas stated that they fired their "largest ever barrage". In addition, an Israeli state-owned oil pipeline was hit by a rocket.

=== May 12 ===
Over 850 rockets crossed into Israeli territory after being launched from Gaza, and another 200 fell inside the Hamas-run coastal enclave. Several rockets have made direct hits on buildings and cars in Israel, killing five Israelis.

An anti-tank guided missile fired from the northern Gaza Strip toward a target inside Israel near the community of Netiv Ha'asara, just north of the enclave. Two people are critically injured and a third is seriously wounded in the attack, according to the Magen David Adom ambulance service. The missile struck a jeep on the border. According to the Times of Israel, Hamas has assumed responsibility for the attack.

Coalition negotiations between Yair Lapid and Naftali Bennett collapse amid the fighting.

=== May 13 ===
Eight victims were confirmed from the May 12 rocket attacks from Hamas, the youngest being five years old. Israel mobilized around 9,000 reservists. The Israel Defense Forces carried out several strikes on Hamas targets in the Gaza Strip.

The Northern District of the Israel Police confirmed that 82 overnight arrests have taken the total number held since the start of Jewish-Arab violence on 10 May 2021 to 232, including suspects as young as 13 and 14 years old.

The Israel Defense Forces confirmed that not including latest over 100 rockets fired toward central Israel, a total of 1,369 rockets have been launched by Hamas since 10 May 2021. Hamas fired rockets to Israel's 2nd international airport, Ramon in the Hevel Eilot region, near Eilat, where flights have been diverted after Ben Gurion Airport was also targeted. The rocket that fell in the Hevel Eilot region, near Israel's southernmost city, Eilat, appears to be the longest-ranged projectile ever fired by Hamas into Israel. The rocket traveled some 250 kilometers into Israeli territory. Hamas launched a number of armed suicide drones from Gaza into southern Israel. One of these crash-landed in an open field, causing no injury or damage, as the aircraft was disarmed by a police sapper.

On 13 May three rockets were fired from the al-Rashidiya Palestinian refugee camp in Lebanon across the Israeli–Lebanese border, landing in the Mediterranean Sea. Hezbollah denied responsibility for the rocket launches and Lebanese Army troops were deployed to the refugee camp, finding several rockets there.

=== May 14 ===
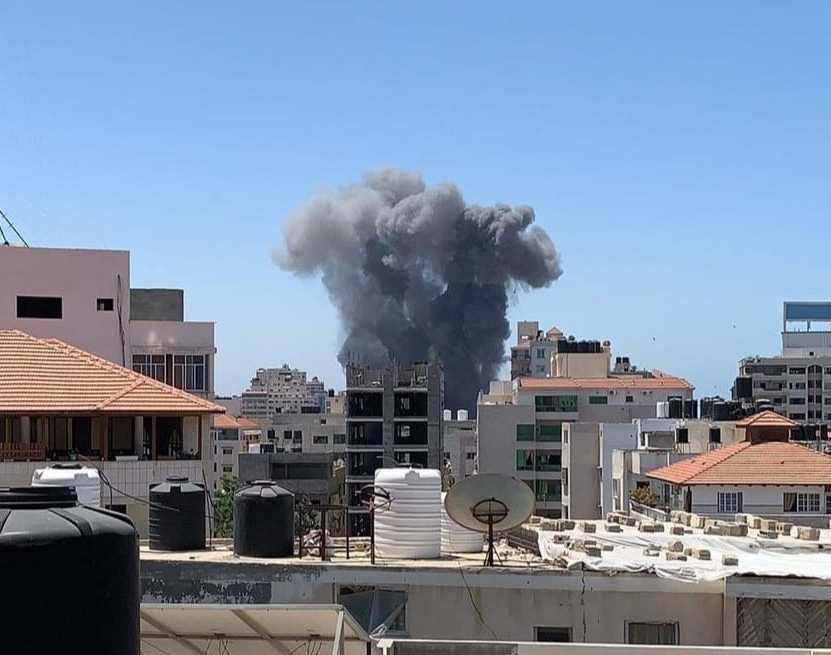
Israeli bombing of the Gaza Strip.

IDF footage of air operations in Gaza on 14 May.

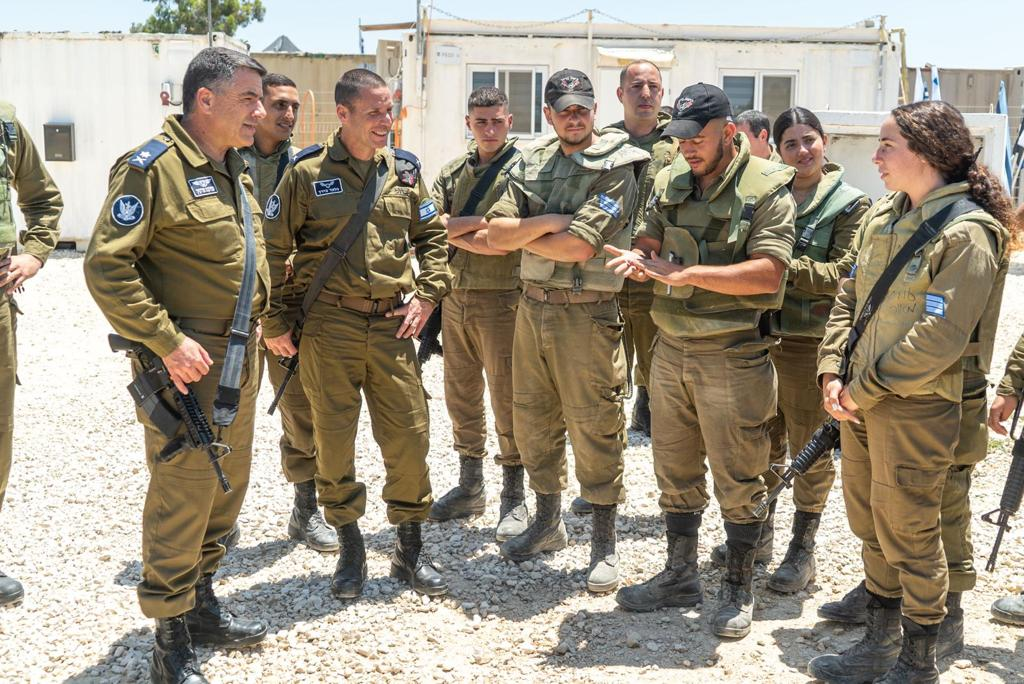
Israeli Air Force commander Amikam Norkin (left) visiting Iron Dome batteries on 14 May.

On 14 May, Israel Defense Forces' ground and air troops claimed they had troops on the ground and in the air attacking the Gaza Strip, although this claim was later retracted and followed with an apology for misleading the press. That same day, the Israeli Air Force launched a massive bombardment of Hamas' tunnel network as well as above-ground positions, reportedly inflicting heavy casualties. It was suspected that the reports of an Israeli ground invasion had been a deliberate ruse to lure Hamas operatives into the tunnels and prepared positions above ground to confront Israeli ground forces so that large numbers could then be killed by airstrikes. According to an Israeli official, the attacks killed hundreds of Hamas personnel, and in addition, 20 Hamas commanders were assassinated and most of its rocket production capabilities were destroyed. Also on 14 May, a Hamas drone was downed by Israeli air defense forces. In total 160 aircraft were used in the Israeli air force's operation.

On the evening of 14 May, three rockets were fired from Syria, while two of them hit the Israeli-occupied Golan Heights but fell in uninhabited places.

=== May 15 ===
On 15 May the IDF targeted the al-Jalaa building in Gaza, which housed Al Jazeera and Associated Press journalists, and a number of other offices and apartments. The building was hit by at least 4 missiles, approximately an hour after Israeli forces called the building's owner, warning of the attack and advising all occupants to evacuate.

An Israeli military spokesperson confirmed the Army struck the media building, saying it contained "Hamas military intelligence". The Associated Press, which had used the building for 15 years, said they had never seen Hamas in the building.

=== May 16 ===
During the night 40 rockets were fired from Gaza towards Ashdod and Ashkelon, according to the IDF. The IDF says they began 'phase II' of the operation to destroy underground tunnel networks in Gaza, dropping 100 bombs from dozens of fighter jets.

The IDF released a video of remote-controlled aircraft operators deciding to give up an attack at the last minute after identifying children in the target area. Dozens more civilian casualties reported in Gaza after airstrikes conducted in response to missile fire.

The IDF reports the total count of missiles launched from Gaza to Israel to be over 3,000.

=== May 17 ===
The Gaza Strip Ministry of Health stated that 212+ Palestinians have died and over 1400 have been injured as of 17 May. An Israeli airstrike hit the only COVID-19 testing lab within the Gaza Strip. The director of the Ministry of Health's preventive medicine department stated that it would take at least a day to get the lab working again.

=== May 18 ===
Egypt has announced they will put $500 million in efforts to rebuild Gaza after Israeli missile strikes.

A missile strike by Hamas killed two foreign workers from Thailand and injured at least seven others.

Israeli Arabs, together with Palestinians in the West Bank and Gaza Strip, held a general strike in protest against Israeli policies actions towards Palestinians. Numerous employers threatened to fire Arab workers who participated in the strike. The management of Rambam Hospital in Haifa sent letters to their Arab employees warning against participating in the strike, and the Ministry of Education came under heavy criticism from teachers throughout Israel after it sent requests to the principals of schools in Arab towns asking for a list of teachers who participated in the strike. There were some instances of employees who participated in the strike being unlawfully dismissed without a prior hearing as required under Israeli law. The Israeli telecommunications company Cellcom paused work for an hour as an act in support of coexistence. The move led to calls for a boycott of Cellcom among Israeli right-wingers who accused it of showing solidarity with the strike, and several Jewish settlement councils and right-wing organizations cut ties with it. Cellcom's stock subsequently dropped by 2%.

=== May 20 ===
Israel and Hamas agree to implement a ceasefire beginning at 2:00am local time on May 21. Egyptian President Abdel Fatah al-Sissi commends U.S. President Joe Biden for joint assistance in brokering the ceasefire.

=== May 21 ===
The IDF reports the total count of targets hit in Gaza as 1500, and reports that 4360 rockets had been fired at Israel since the beginning of the 2021 Israel—Palestine crisis. The report states that approximately 3400 rockets from Gaza landed in Israeli territory, with approximately 680 falling inside the Gaza Strip, and 280 into the sea.

Egypt announces its intent to send a delegation for talks with Palestinians. Ismail Haniyeh states that Hamas will continue to fight Israel until Al-Aqsa Mosque is "liberated".

Despite the ceasefire, violent clashes erupt at Al-Aqsa Mosque. During Friday prayers, worshippers chanted messages in solidarity with Sheikh Jarrah residents and Palestinians in Gaza, and Israeli security forces responded by firing rubber bullets and using stun grenades. CNN reports that journalists in the mosque had been targeted and threatened by Israeli forces. Israel states that it was responding to a "riot" and stone-throwing inside the complex.

== July ==
=== July 7 ===
Khirbet Humsa al-Fawqa was demolished by Israel again for at least the third time.

== September ==
=== September 6 ===
A total of six Palestinian prisoners escaped from Gilboa Prison at dawn on September 6, their fleeing attracting international media attention. They were all recaptured, with the last two individuals rearrested on September 20. An Al Jazeera report referred to the "massive manhunt" by Israelis as taking place in the backdrop of many in the occupied territories having "widely celebrated" the breakout.

=== September 26 ===
Five Hamas fighters were killed in IDF raids in the West Bank against what Israel claimed was a Hamas cell planning attacks against Israel. Two Israeli soldiers were wounded.

== November ==
=== November 21 ===
A Hamas gunman opens fire in the Old City of Jerusalem, killing an Israeli man and wounding four others, before being shot and killed by Israeli police officers.

== See also ==
- 2021 Israel–Palestine crisis
- 2021 in Israel
- 2021 in the Palestinian territories
- List of Palestinian rocket attacks on Israel in 2021
- Timeline of the Israeli–Palestinian conflict
