= Jamal Al-Muhaisen =

Palestinian politician (1949–2022)

Jamal Al-Muhisin

Governor of Nablus Governorate
- In office 2007–2009
- Preceded by: Kamal Sheikh
- Succeeded by: Jibreen Al-Bakri

Personal details
- Born: 15 March 1949 Mount Hebron, Jordanian West Bank
- Died: 7 February 2022 (aged 72) Ein Kerem, Israel
- Party: Fatah
- Education: University of Tripoli; Charles University
- Alma mater: Beirut Arab University

Jamal Al-Muhisin (Arabic: جمال المحيسن; 15 March 1949 – 7 February 2022) was a Palestinian politician.

A member of Fatah, he was Governor of Nablus Governorate from 2007 to 2009.

Al-Muhaisen died from pulmonary fibrosis in Ein Kerem, Israel on 7 February 2022, at the age of 72.
