= Ayman al-Aloul =

Palestinian journalist

Ayman Ghazi Mustafa al-Aloul (Arabic: أيمن غازى مصطفى العالول) is the editor-in-chief of Arab Now Agency, a Gaza Strip-based newspaper. He lives in Gaza City.

Al-Aloul and another journalist, Ramzi Herzallah, were detained from 3–12 January 2016 by Hamas. He has accused the Gazan government of torturing him in prison, in retaliation for his critical Facebook posts. The Palestinian Centre for Human Rights condemned their arrests.

In 2014, Al-Aloul started the Rubble Bucket Challenge, a take on the Ice Bucket Challenge meant to draw attention to the post-war humanitarian situation.
