= Wajeeh Qassim =

Palestinian politician and diplomat (1938–2022)

Palestinian National Authority Ambassador to Morocco
- In office 1988–2005
- Preceded by: position established
- Succeeded by: Hassan Abdel Rahman

Personal details
- Born: 17 February 1938 Silat ad-Dhahr, Mandatory Palestine
- Died: 13 January 2022 (aged 83) Rabat, Morocco
- Party: Fatah

Wajeeh Qassim (Arabic: وجيه قاسم; 17 February 1938 – 13 January 2022) was a Palestinian politician and diplomat. A member of Fatah, he served as the Palestinian National Authority Ambassador to Morocco from 1988 to 2005. He died in Rabat on 13 January 2022, at the age of 83.
