= Mohammad Shtayyeh =

Palestinian politician, academic and economist (born 1958)

- محمد اشتية
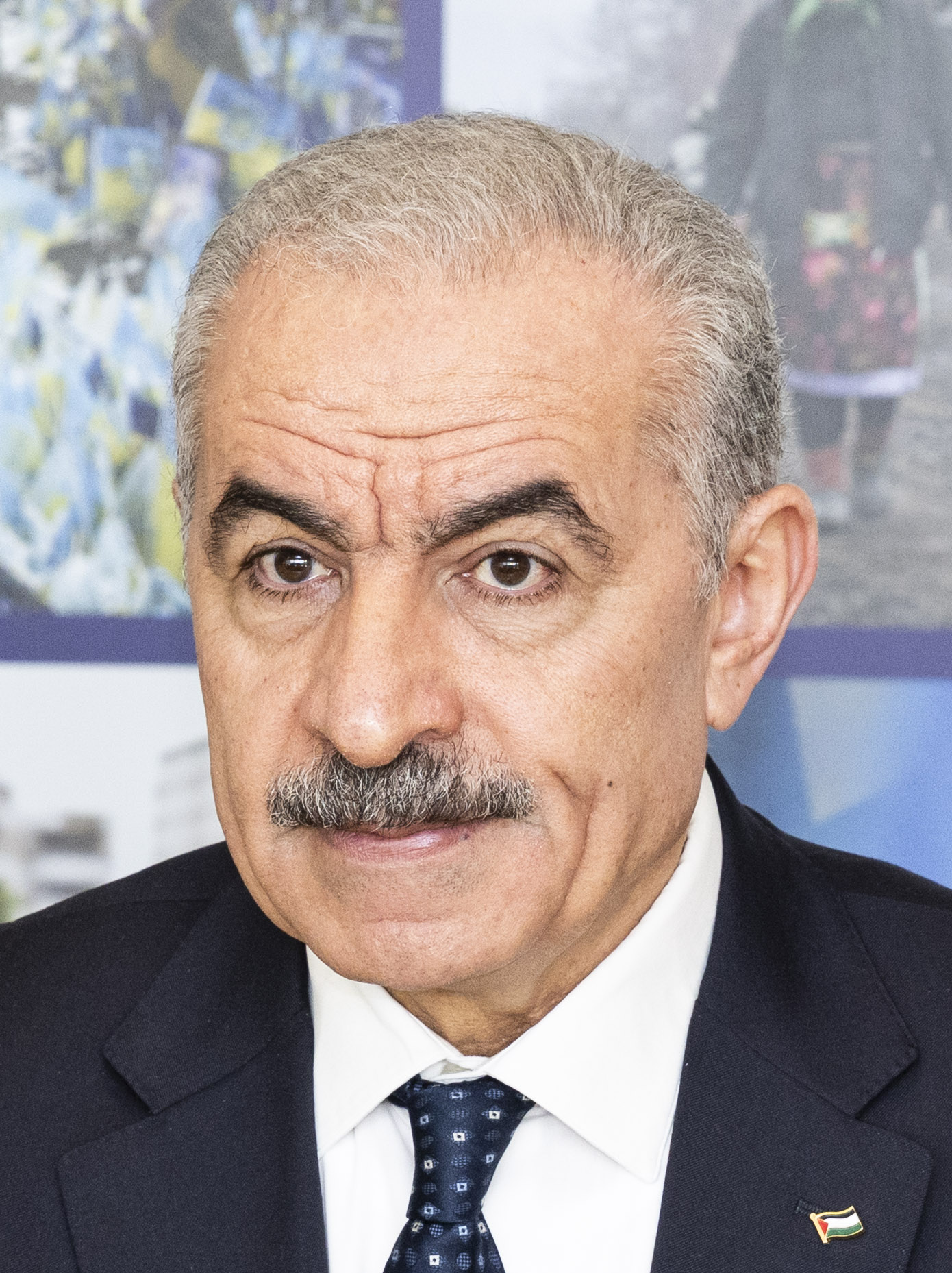
- Shtayyeh in 2025

3rd Prime Minister of Palestine
- In office 13 April 2019 – 31 March 2024
- President: Mahmoud Abbas
- Preceded by: Rami Hamdallah
- Succeeded by: Mohammad Mustafa

Minister of Interior
- In office 13 April 2019 – 1 January 2022
- President: Mahmoud Abbas
- Prime Minister: Himself
- Preceded by: Rami Hamdallah
- Succeeded by: Ziad Hab al-Rih

Minister of Awqaf and Religious Affairs
- In office 13 April 2019 – 1 January 2022
- President: Mahmoud Abbas
- Prime Minister: Himself
- Preceded by: Youssef Ideiss
- Succeeded by: Hatem al-Bakri

Minister of Public Works and Housing
- In office 19 May 2009 – 16 May 2012
- President: Mahmoud Abbas
- Prime Minister: Salam Fayyad
- Preceded by: Mohamed Kamal Hassouna
- Succeeded by: Maher Ghoneim
- In office 24 February 2005 – 29 March 2006
- President: Mahmoud Abbas
- Prime Minister: Ahmed Qurei; Nabil Shaath (acting); Ahmed Qurei
- Preceded by: Abd al-Rahman Hamad
- Succeeded by: Abd al-Rahman Zeidan

Personal details
- Born: Mohammad Ibrahim Shtayyeh; 17 January 1958 (age 68) Tell, Jordanian-administered West Bank, Palestine (present-day Tell, Palestine)
- Party: Fatah
- Education: Birzeit University (BA); University of Sussex (MA, PhD)

Mohammad Ibrahim Shtayyeh (Arabic: محمد اشتية; born 17 January 1958) is a Palestinian politician, academic, and economist who served as the Prime Minister of Palestine from 2019 to 2024. On 26 February 2024, he and his government announced their resignation, remaining in office in a demissionary capacity until a new government was formed on 31 March 2024.

Elected to Fatah's Central Committee in the 2009 and 2016 elections, Shtayyeh is aligned with Palestinian Authority President Mahmoud Abbas.

Shtayyeh was named a minister of Palestinian Economic Council for Development and Reconstruction (PECDAR), a $1.6 billion public investment fund, in 1996. He served as its director of administration and finance from 1994 to 1996.

Shtayyeh was a member of the Palestinian advance team at the Madrid Conference in 1991 and a member of the Palestinian negotiation delegation on subsequent occasions. He was elected minister of public works and housing for the Palestinian Authority in 2005 and 2009.

== Education ==
Shtayyeh graduated from Birzeit University with a bachelor's degree in business administration and economics in 1981. He then attended the Institute of Development Studies at the University of Sussex in Brighton, United Kingdom, receiving his doctorate in economic development in 1989.

== Career ==
Shtayyeh served as a professor of economic development from 1989 to 1991 at Birzeit University. He later became dean of student affairs there until 1993.

From 1995 until 1998, Shtayyeh held the position of Secretary-General of the Central Elections Commission of Palestine. Since 2005, Shtayyeh has been the Palestinian governor for the Islamic Bank. From 2005–2006 and then again from 2009–2012, he was the minister of public works and housing.

== Elections Commission ==
As Secretary-General of the Central Elections Commission of Palestine, he negotiated an agreement with Israel in order to cooperate in the conduct of Palestinian presidential and legislative elections.

== Prime Minister of Palestine (2019–2024) ==
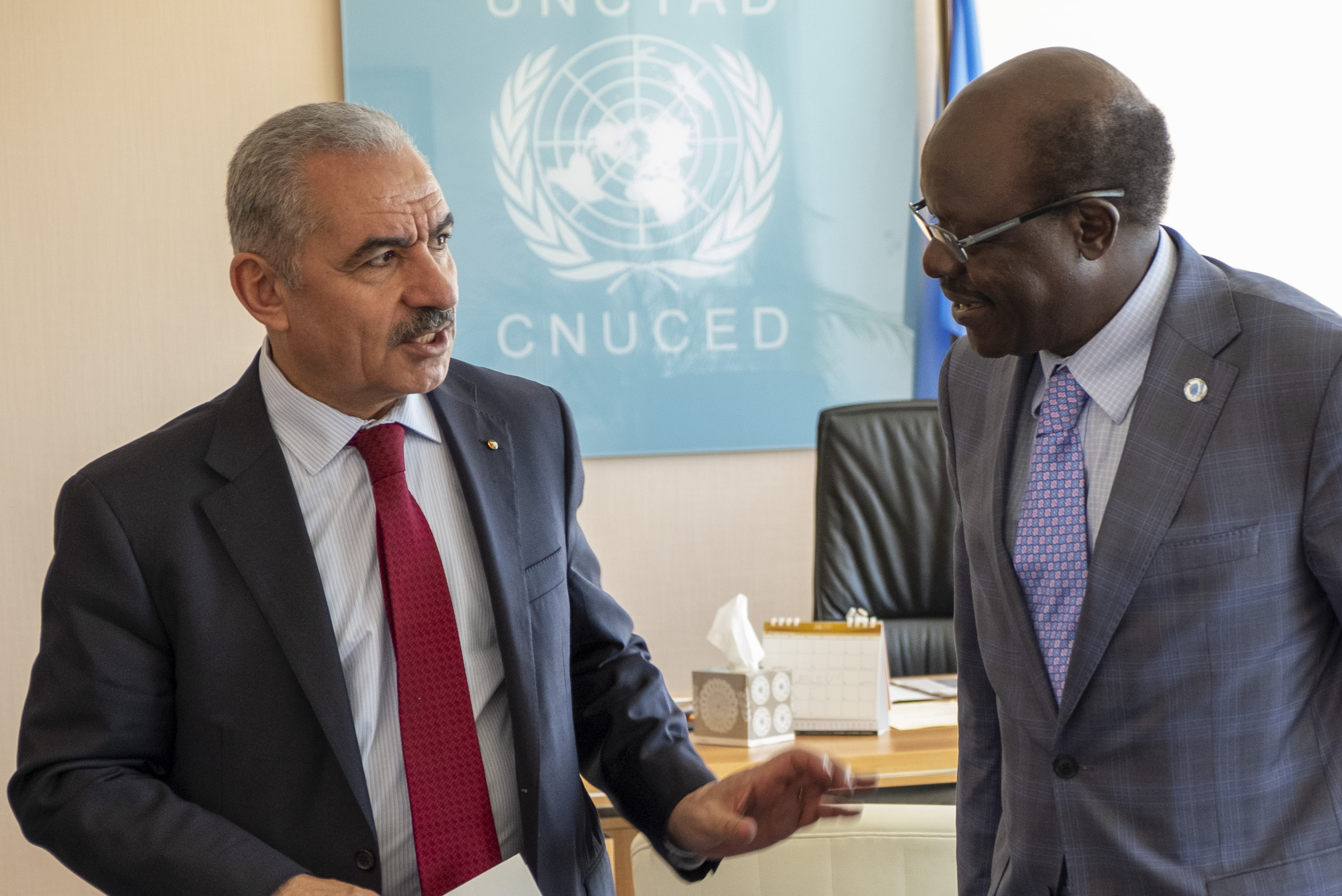
Mohammad Shtayyeh discussing international relations at the Palace of Nations, Geneva in June, 2019.

Shtayyeh was appointed prime minister in March 2019, and took office on 13 April. During his premiership, he has pursued peace negotiations between Hamas, which de facto controls the Gaza Strip, and the Palestinian central government in the West Bank.

When heads of state from the 55-member African Union met for a two-day summit in February 2022, Shtayyeh urged the African Union to remove Israel's observer status.

On 26 February 2024, in the midst of the ongoing Gaza war and its spillover in the West Bank, Shtayyeh announced he would resign, citing dissatisfaction with the current situation in the region and the need for "new governmental and political arrangements" as well as the full extension of Palestinian Authority control over the Palestinian territories. Shtayyeh further underlined unity and consensus between different Palestinian groups had become more urgent in the light of the ongoing genocide and starvation in the Gaza Strip. He remained in office as caretaker prime minister until President Mahmoud Abbas appointed Mohammad Mustafa as his replacement who was sworn in on 31 March 2024.

== Boards and Commissions ==
- President, Board of Trustees, Arab American University, Jenin
- Member, Board of Trustees, Al-Quds University, Jerusalem
- Member, Board of Trustees, Al Najah University, Nablus
- Member, Board of Palestinian Academy for Security Sciences of Alistiqlal University
- Member, Board of Trustees of Middle East Nonviolence Association
- Member, Palestinian Development Fund
- Member, National Committee for Voluntary Work
- Founding member, Palestine Housing Council
- President, Board of Palestinian Economists Association
- Advisory Board, Information and Communication Committee, Office of the President
- Head, Syria Relief Campaign 2012

== Publications ==
- AlMokhtasar Fi Tareekh Falastin, Dar Alshorouk Beirut 2015 (in Arabic)
- Israeli Settlements and the Erosion of the Two- States Solution. Dar Alshorouk Beirut 2015
- Gaza Strip Reconstruction and Development plan, PECDAR, 2014.
- Jerusalem Strategic Development plan, PECDAR, 2013.
- The Palestinian Economy in the Transitional Period. PECDAR, 3d ed., 2010, 2011.
- A Jerusalem Developmental Vision, PECDAR, 2010.
- The Encyclopedia of Palestinian Terms and Concepts, Palestinian Center for Regional Studies, 2009.
- Ikleel Men Shawk (Wreath of Thorns) Arab Scientific Publishers. Beirut, 2009. Collection of short stories.
- The Economies of Islamic Waqf in the Lands of the Palestinian Authority, (with Abdul Aziz Douri & Nael Mousa), PECDAR, 1st ed. 2000 (Arabic) and 2nd ed. 2006 (Arabic).
- Housing Policy in Palestine, Ministry of Public Works & Housing, Ramallah, 2006.
- Israel's Disengagement from the Gaza Strip, (with Tim Sheehi & Eyad Ennab), PECDAR, 2006.
- Palestine: Country Profile, PECDAR, 2006.
- Editor, Vision for Palestine, PECDAR, Jerusalem, 2005.
- Editor, Municipalities and Local Government Units in Palestine – Establishment, Function and its Role in Economic Development, PECDAR, Jerusalem, 2004.
- Editor, The Islamic Movements in the Middle East. Palestinian Center for Regional Studies. Al-Bireh, 2000.
- The Future of the Jewish Settlements. Palestinian Center for Regional Studies, Al-Bireh, 2000.
- Israel in the Region: Conflict, Hegemony, or Cooperation, Palestinian Center for Regional Studies, Al-Bireh, 1998.
- Private-Sector Credits: Donor Assistance, PECDAR, Jerusalem, 1998.
- The Politics of the Middle East Development Bank, Palestinian Center for Regional Studies, Al-Bireh, 1998.
- Palestine: Building the Foundation of Economic Growth, PECDAR, 1st ed. 1987 and 2nd ed. 1998.
- Editor, The Benelux: A Paradigm for the Middle East? Palestinian Center for Regional Studies. Al-Bireh, 1998.
- Editor, Scenarios on the Future of Jerusalem. Palestinian Center for Regional Studies. Al-Bireh, 1998.
- Editor, Labor Migration in the Middle East. Palestinian Center for Regional Studies. Al-Bireh, 1997.
- A’naba: A Palestinian Destroyed Village, Birzeit University, Research Center, 1992.
- The Israeli Immigration and Colonial Settlements: A Zero-sum Situation?, Peter Demand, ed., The Dynamics of Self-Determination. The Hague, 1991.
- Ein Karem: A Palestinian Destroyed Village, Birzeit University, Research Center, 1982.

== Awards ==
- "Chevalier de l'Ordre National du Mérite", awarded by the President of France, Jacques Chirac, May 1999.
- The Samaritan Medal, awarded by the Samaritan Foundation, May 2009.

Political offices
Preceded by Abd al-Rahman Hamad	Minister of Public Works and Housing; 2005–2006	Succeeded by Abd al-Rahman Zeidan
Preceded by Mohamed Kamal Hassouna	Minister of Public Works and Housing; 2009–2012	Succeeded by Maher Ghoneim
Preceded by Rami Hamdallah	Prime Minister of Palestine; 2019–2024	Succeeded by Mohammad Mustafa
Preceded by Rami Hamdallah	Minister of Interior; 2019–2022	Succeeded by Ziad Hab al-Rih
Preceded by Youssef Ideiss	Minister of Awqaf and Religious Affairs; 2019–2022	Succeeded by Hatem al-Bakri
