= Salam Fayyad =

Prime Minister of Palestine from 2007 to 2013

- سلام فياض
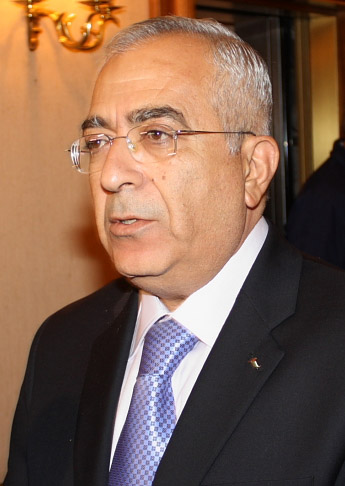
- Fayyad in 2008

1st Prime Minister of the State of Palestine
- In office 6 January 2013 – 6 June 2013
- President: Mahmoud Abbas
- Preceded by: Himself (as Prime Minister of the Palestinian National Authority)
- Succeeded by: Rami Hamdallah

4th Prime Minister of the Palestinian National Authority
- In office 15 June 2007 – 6 January 2013 (disputed with Ismail Haniyeh)
- President: Mahmoud Abbas
- Preceded by: Ismail Haniyeh (Note: Haniyeh was dismissed on 14 June 2007 by Abbas, who appointed Fayyad instead. This was deemed illegal by the Legislative Council, which continued to recognise Haniyeh. The Palestinian Authority govern the West Bank while Hamas govern the Gaza Strip. A unity government was formed in 2014.)
- Succeeded by: Himself (as Prime Minister of the State of Palestine)

Member of the Palestinian Legislative Council
- Incumbent
- Assumed office 18 February 2006

Minister of Finance
- In office 3 March 2013 – 6 June 2013
- Prime Minister: Himself
- Preceded by: Nabeel Kassis
- Succeeded by: Shoukry Bishara
- In office 17 March 2007 – 16 May 2012
- Prime Minister: Ismail Haniyeh; Himself
- Preceded by: Samir Abu Eisheh (acting)
- Succeeded by: Nabeel Kassis
- In office 13 June 2002 – 19 November 2005
- Prime Minister: Yasser Arafat; Mahmoud Abbas; Ahmed Qurei
- Preceded by: Mohammad Zuhdi Nashashibi
- Succeeded by: Ahmed Qurei (acting)

Minister of Foreign Affairs and Expatriates
- In office 15 June 2007 – 19 May 2009
- Prime Minister: Himself
- Preceded by: Ziad Abu Amr
- Succeeded by: Riyad al-Maliki

Minister of National Economy
- In office 7 October 2003 – 12 November 2003
- Prime Minister: Ahmed Qurei
- Preceded by: Maher al-Masri
- Succeeded by: Maher al-Masri

Minister of Planning
- In office 7 October 2003 – 12 November 2003
- Prime Minister: Ahmed Qurei
- Preceded by: Nabeel Kassis
- Succeeded by: Nabeel Kassis

Minister of Agriculture
- In office 7 October 2003 – 12 November 2003
- Prime Minister: Ahmed Qurei
- Preceded by: Rafiq Al-Natsheh
- Succeeded by: Rawhi Fattouh

Minister of Tourism and Antiquities
- In office 7 October 2003 – 12 November 2003
- Prime Minister: Ahmed Qurei
- Preceded by: Mitri Abu Aita
- Succeeded by: Mitri Abu Aita

Minister of Energy and Natural Resources
- In office 7 October 2003 – 12 November 2003
- Prime Minister: Ahmed Qurei
- Preceded by: Azzam Shawwa
- Succeeded by: Azzam Shawwa

Personal details
- Born: 12 April 1952 (age 74) Nablus or Deir al-Ghusun, Jordanian-administered West Bank, Palestine
- Party: Third Way (2005–present)
- Other political affiliations: Independent (before 2005)
- Education: American University of Beirut; St. Edward's University; University of Texas at Austin
- Occupation: Politician, economist

Salam Fayyad (Arabic: سلام فياض, romanized: Salām Fayāḍ; born 12 April 1952) is a Palestinian politician and economist who served as the first prime minister of Palestine from January 2013 until his resignation in June of that same year. He was previously the fourth prime minister of the Palestinian National Authority from 2007 until the post was replaced in 2013. He was minister of finance from June to November 2005 and from March 2007 to May 2012.

Fayyad resigned from the cabinet in November 2005 to run as founder and leader of the new Third Way party for the legislative elections of 2006. The party was not successful, and Fayyad returned as Finance Minister in the March 2007 Unity Government. Fayyad's first appointment as Prime Minister on 15 June 2007, which was justified by Palestinian president Mahmoud Abbas on the basis of "national emergency", was not confirmed by the Palestinian Legislative Council. His successor, Rami Hamdallah, was named on 2 June 2013.

Fayyad is a visiting senior scholar and the Daniella Lipper Coules '95 Distinguished Visitor in Foreign Affairs at the Princeton School of Public and International Affairs at Princeton University. He is widely known for introducing various reforms that improved the Palestinian economy.

== Early life and education ==
Salam Fayyad was born in Nablus or Deir al-Ghusun in northern West Bank on 12 April 1952 (according to some sources in 1951). He graduated from the American University of Beirut in 1975 and received his MBA from St. Edward's University in 1980. Fayyad has a PhD in economics, which he received from the University of Texas at Austin, where he was a student of William Barnett and did early research on the American Divisia Monetary Aggregates, which he continued on the staff of the Federal Reserve Bank of St. Louis.

== Academic and banking career ==
Fayyad began his teaching career at Yarmouk University in Jordan. He then worked at the International Monetary Fund in Washington from 1987 to 1995 and from 1996 to 2001 as the International Monetary Fund's representative to Palestine based in Jerusalem.

== Political career ==
Fayyad served as the regional manager of the Arab Bank in the West Bank and Gaza until he accepted an offer to become Yasser Arafat's Finance Minister in the Palestinian Authority Government of June 2002. He held this post until November 2005, when he resigned from the cabinet to run as founder and leader of the new Third Way party in the legislative elections of 2006 alongside Hanan Ashrawi and Yasser Abd Rabbo. Fayyad and Ashrawi won their seats with only 2.41% of the popular vote. On 17 March 2007, Fayyad was again appointed Finance Minister, this time in the Fatah-Hamas unity government.

== Prime Minister (2007–2013) ==
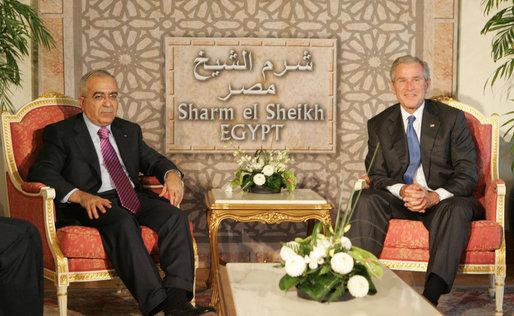
Meeting George W. Bush, 2008

On 15 June 2007, following Hamas' takeover of Gaza, Fayyad was appointed Prime Minister of an emergency government formed by President Abbas. This appointment was challenged as illegal, because it was not approved by the Legislative Council as required by the Palestinian Basic Law.

In late February 2009, Hamas and Fatah started a new round of talks in Cairo. On 7 March 2009, Salam Fayyad submitted his resignation to pave the way for the formation of a national unity government. Eventually, the negotiations broke down. On 19 May 2009, Fayyad was reappointed PM in a new government without Hamas.

On 14 February 2011, Fayyad tendered his government's resignation after PLO negotiator Saeb Erekat resigned over the leakage of the Palestine Papers and Abbas called for elections before September. Abbas asked Fayyad to form a new cabinet. Both Fatah and Hamas opposed this. On 4 May, however, Abbas and Khaled Mashal signed the Cairo agreement to form a transitional government to prepare for legislative and presidential elections. In June, the negotiations were postponed indefinitely and Abbas changed the focus to a bid for UN recognition for Palestinian statehood in September 2011. Abbas expressed his concern over a government with any Hamas involvement because of the international opposition to such a government. Pending further Fatah–Hamas negotiations, Fayyad remained PM of the caretaker government.

Following the February 2012 Doha agreement and the successive May 2012 Cairo accord, which also failed to be implemented, Mahmoud Abbas asked Fayyad to form a new Cabinet, without Hamas' involvement. On 16 May 2012, a reshuffled Cabinet saw the light. Fayyad gave up his post as Finance Minister in favour of Nabeel Kassis. The PA faced an estimated financing gap of about $500 million. Eight new ministers were added to the new 21-member cabinet, with two ministers specifically replaced due to corruption.

On 3 March 2013, Finance Minister Kassis resigned amid deepening economic malaise in the West Bank. The PA faced a huge budget deficit due to insufficient donor funds and financial sanctions regularly imposed by Israel to punish them, and salary payments for some 150,000 PA employees were delayed. Kassis also questioned the state-building agenda adopted by the PA under Fayyad's leadership.

=== Fayyadism: Reform plans ===
Between 2007 and 2013, Fayyad introduced national reform plans sometimes referred to as "Fayyadism". In 2008, he launched his "Palestinian Reform and Development Plan 2008–2010" (PRDP), a West Bank First strategy, aimed to isolate and weaken Hamas in Gaza by developing the West Bank over Gaza, in compliance with American and Israeli desires. It was based on firm control by the PA security and a market-based economic agenda. In 2009, he presented a reform and development plan called "Palestine: Ending the Occupation, Establishing the State." In 2011, he introduced a national development plan for 2011–2013 entitled "Establishing the State, Building our Future."

A major component of Fayyad's plans was modernizing and professionalizing of the Palestinian Security Services under the banner of "One Homeland, One Flag, and One Law".

==== 2009–2010 reform plans ====
On 23 August 2009, Fayyad came out with a plan to reform the fundamental infrastructure of a Palestinian State, called "Palestine: Ending the Occupation, Establishing the State". He detailed a two-year working plan for reinforcing the institutions of the future Palestinian State. This included, among other elements, a separation of powers, a free market, the development of existing infrastructure, and the building of new infrastructure such as government offices, a stock market, and an airport, all with the purpose of establishing a "de facto Palestinian State," based on the premise that the peace talks with Israel were faltering.

In October 2010, The New York Review of Books published an article by Nathan Thrall on Fayyad's security strategy. At the center are "special battalions" of the National Security Forces (NSF), referred to by Hamas as "the Dayton forces". The officer in charge of the vetting, training, equipping, and strategic planning of these special battalions was Lieutenant General Keith Dayton, the United States security coordinator (USSC) for Israel and the Palestinian Authority. Security cooperation between Israel and Palestine reached unprecedented levels in the West Bank. Together they have largely disbanded Fatah's al-Aqsa Martyrs Brigades, attacked Islamic Jihad groups, and all but eliminated Hamas's social institutions, financial arrangements, and military activities in the West Bank.

=== Resignation ===
On 13 April 2013, Prime Minister Fayyad resigned again. Abbas accepted his resignation but asked him to remain as interim prime minister of the Palestinian Authority until a new government could be formed. He resigned because of political differences with Abbas over economic policy. On 6 June 2013, Fayyad was replaced by Rami Hamdallah, who became Prime Minister of the Palestinian Authority Governments of 2013.

== Post-premiership (2013–present) ==
Fayyad's premiership ended on 6 June 2013. In September 2017, the Middle East Initiative (MEI) at Harvard Kennedy School's Belfer Center for Science and International Affairs announced that Salam Fayyad, former prime minister of the Palestinian Authority, will join the Harvard Kennedy School (HKS) community as a Senior Fellow that academic year. As a Senior Fellow, Fayyad would deliver several public and closed addresses, engage with Harvard Kennedy School students, faculty, and affiliates, and participate in various events and activities at MEI, HKS and the broader Harvard campus.

Since 2017, Fayyad has been visiting senior scholar in the School of Public and International Affairs (SIPA) at Princeton University.

== Political views ==
Fayyad has rejected calls for a binational state and unilateral declaration of statehood. In 2012, he said: "[Statehood] is not something that is going to happen to the Israelis, nor something that is going to happen for the Palestinians.... is something that will grow on both sides as a reality... creating a belief that this was inevitable through the process, a convergence of two paths, the political and the process, from the bottom up and the top down."

On 29 June 2011, in contravention of the Palestinian Authority's official position, and that of president Mahmoud Abbas, Fayyad expressed skepticism about its approach to the United Nations for a vote on statehood, saying it would be only a symbolic victory. In 2007, Fayyad was quoted by Forbes: "It's the responsibility of men of religion to ... present religion as a way of tolerance, not as a cover for bloodshed."

He has condemned violence against Israel as detrimental to Palestinian national aspirations, stated that Palestinian refugees could be resettled not in Israel but in a future Palestinian state, and suggested that this state would offer citizenship to Jews. Fayyad condemned the October 7 attacks, expressing grief for the hundreds of Israeli civilians killed. He also expressed grief for civilians in Gaza killed by Israeli airstrikes.

== Public views ==
Fayyad won international and domestic approval for his management of the West Bank. The World Bank credited him with making substantial improvements in Palestinian state institutions.

Thomas Friedman, an American columnist, praised Fayyad for trying to build functioning institutions of a Palestinian state, and not focusing on Israel. Unlike Yasser Arafat, Fayyad "calls for the opposite—for a nonviolent struggle, for building non-corrupt transparent institutions and effective police and paramilitary units, which even the Israeli Army says are doing a good job; and then, once they are all up and running, declare a Palestinian state in the West Bank by 2011."

== See also ==
- Divisia monetary aggregates index

== Notes ==
Political offices
Preceded by Mohammad Zuhdi Nashashibi	Minister of Finance; 2002–2005	Succeeded by Ahmed Qurei; Acting
Preceded by Maher al-Masri	Minister of National Economy; 2003	Succeeded by Maher al-Masri
Preceded by Nabeel Kassis	Minister of Planning; 2003	Succeeded by Nabeel Kassis
Preceded by Rafiq Al-Natsheh	Minister of Agriculture; 2003	Succeeded by Rawhi Fattouh
Preceded by Mitri Abu Aita	Minister of Tourism and Antiquities; 2003	Succeeded by Mitri Abu Aita
Preceded by Azzam Shawwa	Minister of Energy and Natural Resources; 2003	Succeeded by Azzam Shawwa
Preceded by Samir Abu Eisheh; Acting	Minister of Finance; 2007–2012	Succeeded by Nabeel Kassis
Preceded by Ziad Abu Amr	Minister of Foreign Affairs and Expatriates; 2007–2009	Succeeded by Riyad al-Maliki
Preceded by Ismail Haniyeh	Prime Minister of the Palestinian National Authority; Prime Minister of the State of Palestine; 2007–2013	Succeeded by Rami Hamdallah
Preceded by Nabeel Kassis	Minister of Finance; 2013	Succeeded by Shoukry Bishara
