= Rami Hamdallah =

Palestinian politician (born 1958)

- رامي الحمد الله
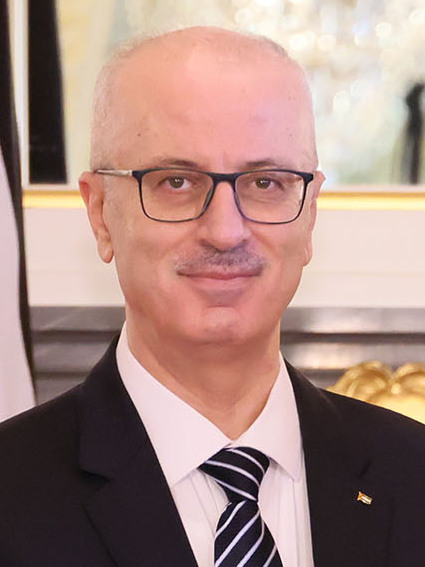
- Hamdallah in 2022

2nd Prime Minister of Palestine
- In office 6 June 2013 – 14 April 2019
- President: Mahmoud Abbas
- Preceded by: Salam Fayyad
- Succeeded by: Mohammad Shtayyeh

Minister of Interior
- In office 2 June 2014 – 14 April 2019
- Prime Minister: Himself
- Preceded by: Saeed Abu Ali
- Succeeded by: Mohammad Shtayyeh

Personal details
- Born: Rami Walid Kamel Hamdallah; 10 August 1958 (age 68) Anabta, Jordanian-administered West Bank, Palestine (present-day Anabta, Palestine)
- Party: Fatah
- Education: University of Jordan (BA); University of Manchester (MA); Lancaster University (PhD)
- Occupation: Politician; academic
- Religion: Sunni Islam

Rami Hamdallah (Arabic: رامي الحمد الله, romanized: Rāmī al-Ḥamd Allāh; born 10 August 1958) is a Palestinian politician and academic. He served as Prime Minister of Palestine from 2013 to 2019 and was previously the president of An-Najah National University in Nablus from 1998 to 2013.

On 2 June 2013, the Palestinian President Mahmoud Abbas named him to succeed Salam Fayyad as prime minister. His appointment was not recognized by Hamas, who were not consulted. He is a member of Fatah although the BBC described him as a political independent. On 20 June 2013, Hamdallah tendered his resignation, which Abbas accepted on 23 June. Six weeks later, Abbas asked Hamdallah to form a new government, which he did on 19 September 2013. He was appointed the head of the unity government on 2 June 2014, a position from which he resigned on 29 January 2019.

== Early life and education ==
Rami Hamdallah was born in Anabta in the northern West Bank, Palestine on 10 August 1958. He graduated from the University of Jordan in 1980 and received his MA from the University of Manchester in 1982. Hamdallah completed a PhD in English linguistics at Lancaster University in 1988.

== Career ==
Hamdallah, known as Abū Wālid ('Father of Walid', after one of his deceased children) is a professor at An-Najah National University. In 1982, he worked there as English instructor, where he met his future wife. He was appointed president of the university in 1998. During his 15 years' term, he tripled the student enrollment and opened a 400-bed teaching hospital. He served as the secretary general of Palestinian Central Elections Commission from 2002 to 2013. He was the commission's deputy chairman in 2011.

== Prime Minister of Palestine (2013–2019) ==
He was sworn in as prime minister on 6 June 2013 and replaced Salam Fayyad in the post. Only two weeks into the job, he tendered his resignation, citing interference from Abbas' aides. Abbas accepted Hamdallah's resignation, but appointed him head of the interim government. Hamdallah's resignation was praised by Mohammed Dajani, the founder of the Wastia Movement of Moderate Islam in the West Bank, who stated that "I respect him for taking this decision. They thought he would be window dressing and he would not accept that."

Six weeks later, Abbas asked him to form a new government, which he did on September 19, 2013.

On 13 March 2018, Hamdallah survived an assassination attempt during his visit to the Gaza Strip. Hamdallah was travelling at the time with Majid Faraj, the Palestinian security chief, and neither man was injured. Hamdallah's spokesperson blamed Hamas for the attempted assassination, saying that Hamas bore "full criminal responsibility." Hamas claimed that it had shot and killed the suspect and an accomplice to the attempted assassination on March 22 in a shootout in which two of its own members also died. However, Hamdallah's spokesperson continued to put the blame on Hamas for the attempted assassination.

On 29 January 2019 Hamdallah and his government handed their resignation to President Abbas, who accepted the request on the following day. He was replaced by Mohammad Shtayyeh on 14 April 2019.

== Post Prime Minister ==
In April 2024 Hamdallah was appointed by Abbas to head the Central Election Commission.

== Personal life ==
Three of his children, 11-year-old twins and a 9-year-old boy, were killed in a car accident in 2000. He and his wife had another daughter afterwards.

== See also ==
- Salah Zawawi

Political offices
Preceded by Salam Fayyad	Prime Minister of Palestine; 2013–2019	Succeeded by Mohammad Shtayyeh
Preceded by Saeed Abu Ali	Minister of Interior; 2014–2019	Succeeded by Mohammad Shtayyeh
