= Prime Minister of the Palestinian National Authority =

Former official head of government of the Palestinian Authority government

The prime minister of the Palestinian National Authority was the position of the official head of government of the Palestinian Authority government, which operated between March 2003 and January 2013, when it was officially transformed into the State of Palestine. Some still refer to the position of the prime minister of the Gaza Strip as the prime minister of the Palestinian National Authority.

The Prime Minister's Office was created in 2003 to manage day-to-day activities of the Palestinian government, which had previously been performed by Yasser Arafat. The position was created because both Israel and the United States refused to negotiate directly with Arafat. The executive structure of the government lies under the president of the Palestinian National Authority.

== History ==
The first prime minister of the Palestinian National Authority was Mahmoud Abbas. He was nominated on 19 March 2003 by President Arafat. On 29 April, the Palestinian Legislative Council approved the appointment and his government. Abbas's short term was marked by a power struggle with Arafat over control of the Palestinian Security Services, with Arafat refusing to relinquish control to Abbas. The issue was critical because the Roadmap for peace plan required the Palestinian side to stop violent attacks by various Palestinian militant groups, which Arafat refused to do. Abbas resigned as prime minister on 6 September 2003, citing lack of support from Israel and the United States as well as "internal incitement" against his government.

Abbas was followed in the office by Ahmed Qurei, who as Speaker of the Palestinian Legislative Council became acting prime minister. Arafat nominated Qurei for the post of prime minister, who agreed to form an "emergency government" on 10 September. The next day, Qurei decided to form a full government rather than a trimmed one. Arafat appointed Qurei Prime Minister on 5 October 2003 by presidential decree, and Qurei's eight-member emergency government was sworn in on 9 October. The Fatah dominated PLC refused to a vote of confidence in the government. Arafat and Qurei were in a standoff over the division between them of security powers, essentially the issue of control of the Palestinian Security Services, which was the same issue that led to Abbas's resignation. Another issue was Arafat's opposition to Qurie's nomination of General Nasser Yousef as Interior Minister who would control the security forces. On 4 November, as the term of the emergency government was about to expire, they agreed for Qurei to stay on on a caretaker basis. On 12 November 2003, the caretaker government was replaced by Qurei's 2003 government, which was confirmed by the PLC. Hakam Balawi, described as an Arafat "loyalist", was appointed Interior Minister, with control of the security forces. After Arafat's death in November 2004 and Mahmoud Abbas' subsequent victory in the Palestinian presidential election in January 2005, which was boycotted by Hamas, Qurei was asked to continue in his post and form a new government, which took place on 24 February 2005. On 15 December 2005, Qurei resigned, and Nabil Shaath, the deputy prime minister, became acting prime minister. He lost the position nine days later when Qurei returned to office.

Hamas decisively won the PLC election held on 25 January 2006. Qurei resigned, but at the request of President Abbas remained as interim prime minister until 19 February 2006. Ismail Haniyeh of Hamas was nominated Prime Minister on 16 February 2006 and the new government was formally presented to Abbas on 20 February and the government led by Haniyeh was sworn in on 29 March 2006. A struggle for power between President Abbas and the new government emerged over the security services. Abbas made Fatah-affiliated Rashid Abu Shbak head of the three branches of the Palestinian Security Services, with authority to hire and fire officers in the three security branches, bypassing the authority of the Hamas Interior Minister Said Seyam. Abbas also ordered all diplomatic statements and dealings be coordinated with the Fatah-dominated Palestine Liberation Organization, and not the Hamas Foreign Minister Mahmoud Zahar. Haniyeh also led the Unity Government formed on 17 March 2007, which was approved by the PLC. After the Hamas takeover of Gaza, the government was dismissed by President Abbas on 14 June 2007.

Abbas declared a state of emergency and on 15 June appointed an emergency caretaker government led by Salam Fayyad and suspended articles of the Basic Law to dispense with the needed PLC approval. On 13 July 2007, the state of emergency expired in accordance with the Basic Law, and President Abbas issued a new decree to continue the state of emergency. The Fayyad government continued functioning as a caretaker government. On 22 July 2007, Prime Minister Fayyad presented his government for PLC approval. As the quorum requirement could not be met, as Hamas members were boycotting the PLC, the approval was given in "extraordinary" session.

Meanwhile, Haniyeh and Hamas refused to accept the dismissal, and claimed to still be the legitimate government of the Palestinian Authority. The basis of the challenge was that under the Basic Law, the president may dismiss a sitting prime minister, but may not appoint a replacement without the approval of the PLC (which was controlled by Hamas), and that until a new prime minister is properly appointed, the outgoing prime minister heads a caretaker government.

== Term ==
The prime minister is appointed by the president of the Palestinian National Authority and not directly elected by the Palestinian Legislative Council or Palestinian voters. The president can dismiss the prime minister at any time. The Basic Law requires that a new prime minister and his government are presented to the Palestinian Legislative Council for approval or confirmation. In the event of a vacancy in the office, the Speaker of the Palestinian Legislative Council becomes acting prime minister. If an emergency government is formed by presidential decree, it is only valid for thirty days. The president can nominate a caretaker prime minister, pending the formation of a new government. Prime ministers appointed on an acting, caretaker or emergency basis do not need to obtain approval or confirmation of the PLC.

Unlike the prime minister's office in many other nations, the Palestinian prime minister is not required to be a member of the legislature while in office. Instead, the nomination is made independently by the president, taking into account the political situation at the time. Following the international sanctions against the government led by Hamas, which was designated a terrorist organisation by several countries between 2006 and 2007, Abbas instead appointed experts as prime ministers since 2007, who are considered rather independent from party interests by observers.

== List of prime ministers (2003–2013) ==
| No. | Portrait | Name (Birth–Death) | Term | | | Political party |
| No. | Portrait | Name (Birth–Death) | Took office | Left office | Duration | Political party |
|---|---|---|---|---|---|---|
| 1 | | Mahmoud Abbas (born 1935) | 19 March 2003 | 6 September 2003 | 171 days | Fatah (PLO) |
| 2 | | Ahmed Qurei (1937–2023) | 7 October 2003 | 15 December 2005 | 2 years, 69 days | Fatah (PLO) |
| – | | Nabil Shaath (born 1938); Acting Prime Minister | 15 December 2005 | 24 December 2005 | 9 days | Fatah (PLO) |
| (2) | | Ahmed Qurei (1937–2023) | 24 December 2005 | 29 March 2006 | 95 days | Fatah (PLO) |
| 3 | | Ismail Haniyeh (1962–2024) (Note: Prime Minister of the Palestinian National Authority of the Government in the Gaza Strip.) | 29 March 2006 | 14 June 2007 (Note: Disputed from 14 June 2007.) (Dismissed) | 1 year, 77 days | Hamas |
| 3 | | Ismail Haniyeh (1962–2024) | 29 March 2006 | 2 June 2014 (Unrecognized) | 8 years, 65 days | Hamas |
| 4 | | Salam Fayyad (born 1952) (Note: Prime Minister of the Palestinian National Authority of the Government in the West Bank.) | 15 June 2007 | 6 January 2013 (Note: Became the Prime Minister of the State of Palestine.) | 5 years, 205 days | Third Way |

== See also ==
- Chairman of the Palestine Liberation Organization
- President of Palestine
- President of the Palestinian National Authority
- Speaker of the Palestinian Legislative Council
- Leaders of Palestinian institutions
