= Prime Minister of Palestine =

Head of government

Prime Minister of State of Palestine
- رئيس وزراء دولة فلسطين
- Emblem of Palestine

- Flag of Palestine

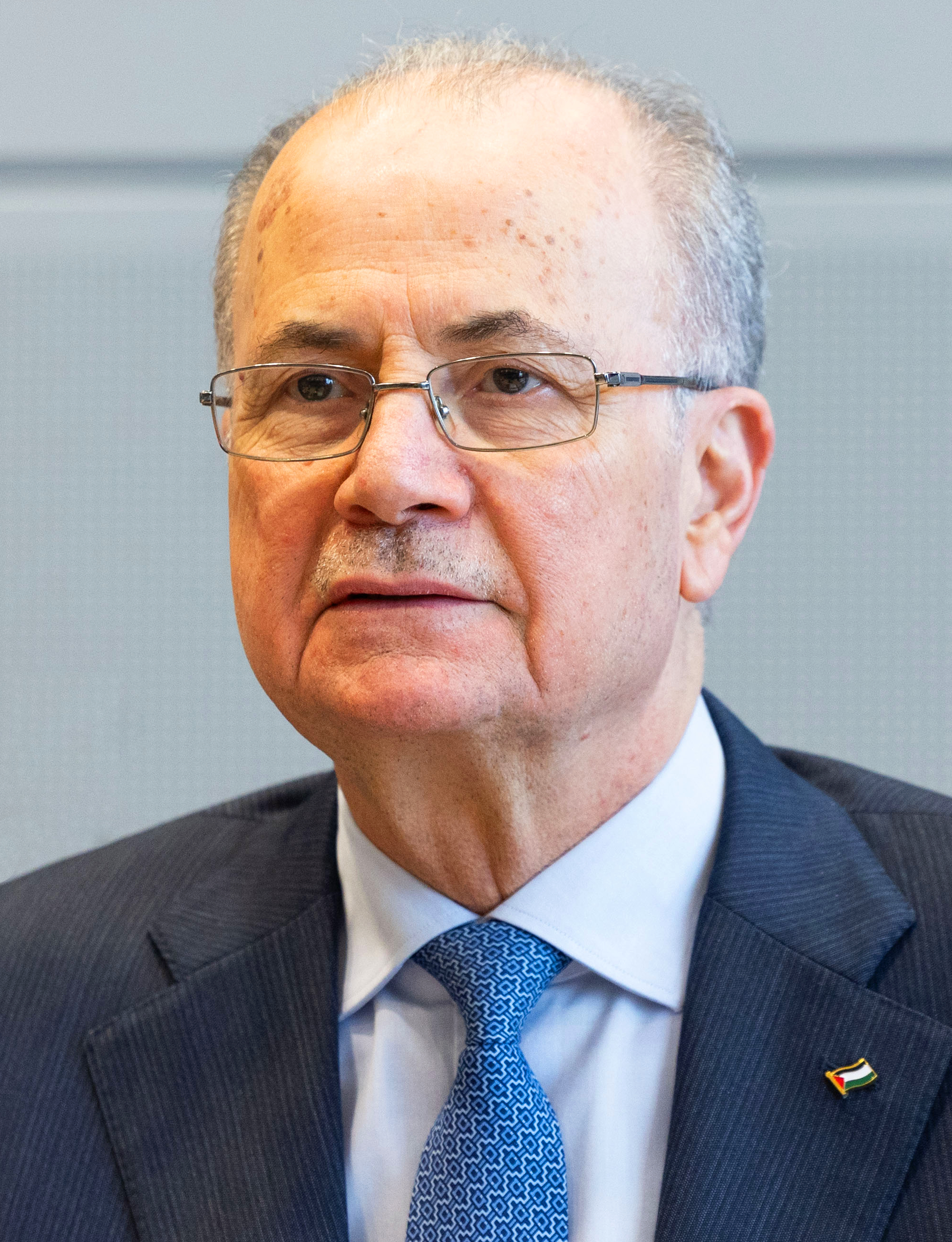
- Incumbent; Mohammad Mustafa since 31 March 2024
- Palestinian government
- Style: His Excellency
- Appointer: The president
- Term length: 4 years
- Precursor: Prime Minister of the Palestinian National Authority
- Formation: 6 January 2013
- First holder: Salam Fayyad
- Salary: US$48,000 annually

The prime minister of the State of Palestine is the head of government of Palestine. The post has been in existence since January 2013, when the Palestinian National Authority was officially renamed into the State of Palestine and replaced the previous position of the prime minister of the Palestinian National Authority.

== Term ==
The prime minister is appointed by the president of Palestine.

== List of prime ministers (2013–present) ==
No.	Portrait	Name (Birth–Death)	Term			Political party
No.	Portrait	Name (Birth–Death)	Took office	Left office	Duration	Political party
1	Salam Fayyad	Salam Fayyad (born 1951)	6 January 2013	6 June 2013	151 days	Third Way
2	Rami Hamdallah	Rami Hamdallah (born 1958)	6 June 2013	14 April 2019 (Note: Resigned on 23 June 2013; reappointed on 19 September 2013 and 2 June 2014.)	5 years, 312 days	Independent
3	Mohammad Shtayyeh	Mohammad Shtayyeh (born 1959)	14 April 2019	31 March 2024	4 years, 352 days	Fatah
4	Mohammad Mustafa	Mohammad Mustafa (born 1954)	31 March 2024	Incumbent	2 years, 160 days	Independent

== See also ==
- Prime Minister of the Palestinian National Authority
- Speaker of the Palestinian Legislative Council
- Leaders of Palestinian institutions
