= Government of Palestine =

Government of the State of Palestine حكومة دولة فلسطين
- Formation: 22 September 1948 (first form); 5 July 1994 (current form)
- Founding document: Basic Law of Palestine
- Country: Palestine

Legislative branch
- Legislature: Palestinian Legislative Council
- Speaker: Speaker of the Palestinian Legislative Council
- Assembly members: 132
- Meeting place: Legislative Council Building, Ramallah, Palestine

Executive branch
- Head of state: President of Palestine
- Head of government: Prime Minister of Palestine
- Appointed by: President of Palestine
- Headquarters: Ramallah, Palestine
- Main organ: Cabinet of Palestine

Judicial branch
- Court: Supreme Court of Palestine
- Chief Justice: President of the Supreme Court of Palestine
- Seat: Supreme Court Building, Ramallah, Palestine

The government of Palestine (Arabic: حكومة فلسطين) is the government of the Palestinian Authority or the State of Palestine. Since June 2007, there have been two separate administrations in Palestine, one in the West Bank and the other in the Gaza Strip.

The Fatah government in the West Bank was generally recognised as the Palestinian Authority Government. The Fatah-dominated Executive Committee of the Palestine Liberation Organization (EC) is the highest executive body of the Palestine Liberation Organization and acts as the government. On the other hand, the Hamas government in the Gaza Strip also claimed to be the legitimate government of the Palestinian Authority.

Until June 2014, when the Palestinian Unity Government was formed, the government in the West Bank was the Fatah-dominated Palestinian government of 2013. In the Gaza Strip, the government was the Hamas government of 2012. Following two Fatah–Hamas Agreements in 2014, on 25 September 2014 Hamas agreed to let the PA Government resume control over the Gaza Strip and its border crossings with Egypt and Israel. However, that agreement had broken down by June 2015, after President Abbas said the PA government was unable to operate in the Gaza Strip.

== History ==
The following organizations have claimed or exercised authority over the Palestinian people or a Arab state in Palestine in the past:

- Arab Higher Committee, the central political organ of the Arab community of Mandatory Palestine. It was established on 25 April 1936 and was sidestepped by the All-Palestine Government in 1948.
  - First Committee 1936-1937 (Arab Higher Committee)
  - Second Committee 1945-1948 (Arab Higher Committee)
- All-Palestine Government, a Palestinian entity set-up by the Arab League in Egypt-occupied Gaza Strip on 22 September 1948. It was dissolved by Egypt in 1959.
- Palestine Liberation Organization has been the official representative of the Palestinian people internationally since 1964. On 22 November 1974, United Nations General Assembly Resolution 3236 recognized the right of the Palestinian people to self-determination, national independence and sovereignty in Palestine. It also recognized the PLO as the sole legitimate representative of the Palestinian people, and accorded it observer status in the United Nations.
  - Executive Committee of the Palestine Liberation Organization (EC) is the highest executive body of the PLO. Mahmoud Abbas has been Chairman of the EC since the death of Yasser Arafat in November 2004. The EC represents the Palestinian people, supervises the various PLO bodies, executes the policies and decisions of the PNC, and handles the PLO’s financial issues. The EC represents the PLO internationally, and acts as the government of the State of Palestine.

=== PNA governments ===
Palestinian National Authority was formally an interim administrative body established by the PLO pursuant to the Oslo Accords of 1993. Pursuant to the Oslo Accords, the PA Government had only authority over some civil rights of the Palestinians in the West Bank Areas A and B and in the Gaza Strip, and over internal security in Area A and in Gaza. One of the security tasks was the security cooperation between Israel and the Palestinian Authority, which among other things aimed at the prevention of Palestinian attacks on the Israeli army and settlers. Until 2007 it exercised control of populated areas in Area A and B of the West Bank and in the Gaza Strip:

- Palestinian Authority Government of 1996—formed following the first general elections held on 20 January 1996. It was headed by Chairman of the PLO Yasser Arafat, and functioned until 29 April 2003.
- Palestinian government of October 2002 (PNA)
- Palestinian government of November 2003 (PNA)
- Palestinian government of March 2006 (PNA)
- Palestinian government of March 2007 (PNA, unity of Hamas and Fatah)

=== Split of Fatah and Hamas ===
Since June 2007, the Fatah-led government has exercised authority in Ramallah, West Bank, and has been recognized as the official government of the Palestinian Authority; while since Hamas took control in the Gaza Strip, it has exercised de facto control there, ousting Fatah PNA representatives in June 2007.

- Fatah government in the West Bank
  - Palestinian governments of June–July 2007 (PNA, Fatah)
  - Palestinian government of 2009 (PNA, Fatah)
  - Palestinian governments of 2013 (PNA, Fatah)—two governments were formed in 2013, in June and September, after the upgrade in the United Nations of Palestine to the status of non-member observer state. Both were led by Rami Hamdallah.
  - Palestinian government of 2015 (PNA, Fatah)—led by Hamdallah.
  - Palestinian government of 2019 (PNA, Fatah)—the 18th Palestinian government since the establishment of the PA in 2004, led by Mohammad Shtayyeh, member of the Fatah Central Committee, the 23-member government includes 16 new ministers.
- Hamas government in the Gaza Strip
  - First Hamas government 2007–12 (Hamas Administration in Gaza)
  - Second Hamas government September 2012–14 (Hamas Administration in Gaza)
  - Third Hamas government 2016–present is the Gaza-based Hamas-dominated de facto government in Gaza. It is made up of Deputy Ministers, Directors General and other high-level officials, not directly bound to the Ramallah administration. It was initially speculated that the 2016 Hamas government is an attempt by Ismail Haniyeh to return to full control of the Gaza enclave. The United States, Canada, the European Union, Japan and Israel classify Hamas as a terrorist organization and do not recognize the government. Hamas government is not recognized by the Ramallah administration of the State of Palestine.
- Palestinian Unity Government
  - The Palestinian Unity Government was formed on 2 June 2014, following the Fatah-Hamas Reconciliation Agreement of 23 April 2014. However, the Government was not presented for approval by the Legislative Council, leading to its legitimacy being questioned. The ministers were nominally independent, but overwhelmingly seen as loyal to President Abbas and his Fatah movement or to smaller leftist factions, none of whom were believed to have close ties to Hamas. A feature of this government is the appointment of Deputy Ministers, Directors General and other high-level officials for Gaza, and not directly bound to the Ramallah administration. The government of 2014 resigned on 17 June 2015, under protest from Hamas which was not consulted. In July and December 2015, Abbas reshuffled the cabinet and appointed new ministers without consulting Hamas, which was denounced by Hamas. Although Hamas did not recognize the new ministers and rejected the changes, the reshuffling was called "technical and not political", and the new cabinet was presented as a slightly changed existing government, still called "consensus government".

=== 2024 Beijing Declaration ===
Following talks mediated by China, on 23 July 2024, Palestinian groups including Hamas and Fatah reached an agreement to end their divisions and form an interim unity government, which they announced in the "Beijing Declaration". The agreement was designed to address governance for "the day after" a ceasefire with Israel.

=== Gaza Strip under United Nations Security Council Resolution 2803 ===
A peace plan agreed by both Hamas and the Israeli government includes provisions for a Board of Peace and National Committee for the Administration of Gaza to administer the Gaza Strip for a transitional period, before turning over administration to a reformed Palestinian Authority.

== Current cabinet of Palestine ==
#	Office	Portrait	Name	Party	Took office
1	Prime Minister		Muhammad Abdullah Muhammad Mustafa	Independent	31 March 2024
2	Minister of Foreign Affairs and Expatriates		Farsin Ohanes Vartan Aghabikan	Independent	23 June 2025
3	Minister of Justice		Sharhabeel Youssef Saad al-Din al-Zaim	Independent	31 March 2024
4	Minister of Interior		Ziad Mahmoud Muhammad Hab al-Rih	Fatah	1 January 2022
5	Minister of Finance and Planning		Estephan Salameh	Independent	15 December 2025
6	Minister of Local Government		Sami Ahmed Arif Hijjawi	Independent	31 March 2024
7	Minister of Health		Majid Awni Muhammad Abu Ramadan	Independent	31 March 2024
8	Minister of Education and Higher Education		Amjad Saad Suleiman Barham	Independent	31 March 2024
9	Minister of Labor		Enas Hosni Abdel Ghani Attari	Independent	31 March 2024
10	Minister of Awqaf and Religious Affairs		Sharhabeel Youssef Saad al-Din al-Zaim	Independent	19 October 2026
11	Minister of Industry		Arafat Hussein Suleiman Asfour	Independent	31 March 2024
12	Minister of National Economy		Muhammad Youssef Muhammad al-Amour	Independent	31 March 2024
13	Minister of Telecommunications and Digital Economy		Abdel Razek Maher Abdel Razek Natsheh	Independent	31 March 2024
14	Minister of Public Works and Housing		Ahed Faeq Atef Bseiso	Independent	31 March 2024
15	Minister of Social Development		Samah Abdul Rahim Hussein Abu Aoun	Independent	31 March 2024
16	Minister of Agriculture		Rizq Abdul Rahman Salem Salimiya	Independent	31 March 2024
17	Minister of Tourism and Antiquities		Hani Naji Atallah al-Hayek	Fatah	31 March 2024
18	Minister of Jerusalem Affairs		Ashraf Hassan Abbas al-Awar	Independent	31 March 2024
19	Minister of Culture		Imad al-Din Abdullah Salim Hamdan	Independent	31 March 2024
20	Minister of Transport and Communications		Mohammed al-Ahmad	Independent	15 November 2025
21	Minister of Women's Affairs		Mona Muhammad Mahmoud al-Khalili	Independent	31 March 2024
22	Minister of State for Relief Affairs		Samah Abdul Rahim Hussein Abu Aoun (Interim)	Independent	20 January 2025
	General Secretariat of the Council of Ministers		Dawas Tayseer Rasheed Dawas	Independent	31 March 2024
	Government Spokesperson		Muhammad Abu al-Rub	Independent	31 March 2024

== List of cabinets ==
Government	Dates in office	Prime Minister
All-Palestine	22 September 1948 – June 1959	Ahmed Hilmi Pasha
1st	5 July 1994 – 17 May 1996	Yasser Arafat
2nd	17 May 1996 – 9 August 1998	Yasser Arafat
3rd	9 August 1998 – 13 June 2002	Yasser Arafat
4th	13 June 2002 – 29 October 2002	Yasser Arafat
5th	29 October 2002 – 30 April 2003	Yasser Arafat
6th	30 April 2003 – 7 October 2003	Mahmoud Abbas
7th	7 October 2003 – 12 November 2003	Ahmed Qurei
8th	12 November 2003 – 24 February 2005	Ahmed Qurei
9th	24 February 2005 – 29 March 2006	Ahmed Qurei
10th	29 March 2006 – 17 March 2007	Ismail Haniyeh
11th	17 March 2007 – 14 June 2007	Ismail Haniyeh
12th	14 June 2007 – 19 May 2009	Salam Fayyad
13th	19 May 2009 – 16 May 2012	Salam Fayyad
14th	16 May 2012 – 6 June 2013	Salam Fayyad
15th	6 June 2013 – 19 September 2013	Rami Hamdallah
16th	19 September 2013 – 2 June 2014	Rami Hamdallah
17th	2 June 2014 – 13 April 2019	Rami Hamdallah
18th	13 April 2019 – 31 March 2024	Mohammad Shtayyeh
19th	31 March 2024 – present	Mohammad Mustafa

== Public opinion ==
During the backdrop of the Gaza war in 2024, Zogby Research Services conducted a poll of Palestinians from the West Bank and from Gaza Strip regarding prospects of future governance in Gaza. A majority of respondents from the Gaza Strip (52%) supported some form of governance from the Palestinian Authority, either directly by a reformed PA (23%) or indirectly by Gazan administrators linked to the PA (29%). A much-smaller percentage (24%) supported any Hamas involvement, either as the sole party in government (7%) or in a unity government with Fatah (17%). Conversely, only 20% of respondents from the West Bank prefer any PA involvement, either directly (9%) or indirectly (11%), but massively prefer Hamas involvement, either exclusively (38%) or in unity with Fatah (34%). One point of unity is the unpopularity of president Mahmoud Abbas, with strong majorities from respondents in both regions (>70%) supporting his resignation.

== See also ==
- Finance Minister of the Palestinian National Authority
- Foreign Affairs Minister of the Palestinian National Authority
- Foreign relations of Palestine
- Foreign relations of the Palestine Liberation Organization
- International recognition of the State of Palestine
- Israeli Civil Administration
- Palestinian Declaration of Independence
- Palestinian Ambassador to the United Nations
