= Ar-Rifa'iyya =

Village in Hebron Governorate, Palestine

Arabic transcription(s)
  - Arabic: الرّفاعية
- Location of Ar-Rifa'iyya within Palestine
- Coordinates: 31°26′50.2224″N 35°9′12.9708″E
- State: State of Palestine
- Governorate: Hebron

Government
  - Type: Village

Area
  - Total: 200 dunams (20 ha; 49 acres)

Population (2007)
  - Total: 360
  - Density: 1,800/km^{2} (4,700/sq mi)

Ar-Rifa'iyya (Arabic: الرفاعيّة), is a Palestinian village in the Hebron Governorate, located east of the city of Yatta and south of the city of Hebron in the West Bank, and within the lands occupied after the 1967 war.

== Population ==
The population of the village of Ar-Rifa'iyya and Ad-Deirat in 2017, according to the Palestinian Central Bureau of Statistics, was 1,301 people, and it is part of the village council (Khallet Al-Mayya, Ad-Deirat, Ar-Rifa'iyya, Umm Lasafa,Umm Ashoqan, Wadi Al-Maa Plain, Al-Buweib) affiliated with the Palestinian Ministry of Local Government.
