= Umm Ashoqan =

Village in Hebron Governorate, Palestine

Umm Ashoqan Arabic: أم الشقحان
- Umm Ashoqan
- Location of Umm Ashoqan within Palestine
- Coordinates: 31°27′07″N 35°08′27″E
- Country: Palestine
- Governorate: Hebron Governorate

Population (2017)
  - Total: 605

Umm Ashoqan is a Palestinian village in the Hebron Governorate, located east of Yatta in the southern West Bank.

== Geography ==
It is bordered by the village of Ar-Rifa'iyya to the east, the village of Al-Buweib to the north, Umm al-Amad to the west, and Khalet al-Maiyya to the south.

== Population ==
It is considered part of the Khalet al-Maiyya Municipality (Palestinian Authority). The village's population in 2017 was approximately (605) people, according to the Palestinian Central Bureau of Statistics.

== See also ==
- Hebron Governorate
