= Sahel Wadi Elma =

Village in Hebron Governorate, Palestine

Sahel Wadi Elma Arabic: أم العمد أو سيل وادي الما
- Sahel Wadi Elma
- Location of Sahel Wadi Elma within Palestine
- Country: Palestine
- Governorate: Hebron Governorate

Population (2017)
  - Total: 397

Sahel Wadi Elma Umm al-Amad, also known as the Wadi al-Ma Plain, is a Palestinian village located in the southern West Bank, south of Hebron and east of Yatta.

== Population ==
According to 2017 estimates from the Palestinian Central Bureau of Statistics, the population of Sahel Wadi Elma (Umm al-Amad) was 397.

== Local Governance ==
Umm al-Amad is administered by the Khalet al-Maiyya Municipal Council, which operates under the jurisdiction of the Palestinian Ministry of Local Government.

== See also ==
- Hebron Governorate
