= Mohammed Dajani Daoudi =

Palestinian professor and peace activist

Mohammed Shihad Dajani Daoudi
- محمد الدجاني الداودي
- Mohammed Dajani Daoudi, in an interview to Davar.co.il, August 2026
- Born: March 19, 1946 (age 80); Jerusalem
- Education: American University of Beirut; University of South Carolina; University of Texas at Austin
- Employer: Al-Quds University

Mohammed Shihad Dajani Daoudi (Arabic: محمد الدجاني الداودي; born March 19, 1946) is a Palestinian professor and peace activist. Dajani gained international recognition for his work in helping to raise awareness concerning the Holocaust through a variety of media. Dajani has also been active in forming relationships with Jewish and Christian religious leaders and peace activists to spread the Wasatia message of understanding, tolerance, coexistence and brotherhood. Dajani is tackling the ideological roots of extremism. In 2014, he became the center of a controversy when he led a group of students from Al-Quds University to Auschwitz.

== Early life ==
Dajani was born to one of Jerusalem's historic Arab families. The honorific "Daoudi" was added to the family name in 1529 when Suleiman the Magnificent designated an ancestor keeper of the Tomb of King David on Mount Zion. His family fled to Egypt when Israel declared its independence in 1948, but returned to the Old City of Jerusalem the following year (then under Jordanian rule).

Dajani's parents, well-educated secular Muslims, sent him to English-speaking Quaker-run schools. As an engineering student at the American University of Beirut, Dajani joined Fatah. Although he received military training, he was put to work in the English-language public relations department of the Palestine Liberation Organization.

In 1975, Lebanon deported Dajani. Banned from both Israel and Jordan because of his Fatah activities, he decided to travel to the United States to continue his education. He eventually earned a Ph.D. in government from the University of South Carolina and another Ph.D. in political economy at the University of Texas at Austin.

== Career ==
By this time, Dajani's father was successful in getting his son a pardon from King Hussein of Jordan. Dajani was hired by the Applied Science Private University in Amman, where he created and chaired the political science and diplomacy department. In 1993, his father won permission from Israel for Dajani to return to Jerusalem.

Dajani accompanied his father to chemotherapy treatments at Hadassah Medical Center, Ein Kerem, an Israeli hospital in Jerusalem, where the younger man was surprised at the way his father was being treated: "I was expecting that they would be treating him differently—with discrimination—as a Palestinian, as an Arab, as a Muslim. I found out that this was not the case. They were treating him like a patient." Dajani saw many other Palestinians receiving medical care from Israeli doctors. Several years later, a second experience with Israeli health care affected Dajani; his mother became ill near Ben Gurion Airport. "I did not believe that anybody would help her, being an Arab and coming to an airport where Israelis are very keen about security." Dajani was surprised when an ambulance was called and paramedics tried to revive his mother for more than an hour. "I became confused about my enemy, who did their best to help my father and my mother. I started to see the other side of my enemy, which is the human side."

During the late 1990s, Dajani trained Palestinian civil servants for the United Nations Development Programme and various Palestinian organizations. In 1999, he was invited to Turkey to lead a program for Israeli and Palestinian religious leaders, which he developed into a conflict-resolution model called "Big Dream, Small Hope".

Dajani was invited to join the faculty at Al-Quds University in 2001, and the following year he established its American Studies Institute. In 2007, with his brother, Munther Dajani Daoudi, he co-founded Wasatia ("Moderation"), an organization that promotes the Islamic traditions of nonviolence and compromise.

== Auschwitz trip ==
In March 2014, Dajani took a group of 27 students from Al-Quds University to visit the Nazi death camps at Auschwitz. They are believed to be the first group of students from Palestine to visit the Auschwitz-Birkenau State Museum. The trip to Auschwitz was part of a joint project with the Friedrich Schiller University Jena and Ben-Gurion University of the Negev, whose purpose was to teach Palestinian and Israeli students about the "suffering that has helped shape the historical consciousness of the other side". (For their part, the Israeli students visited the Dheisheh refugee camp near Bethlehem.)

After the Israeli newspaper Haaretz wrote about the trip, and the Hebrew article was mistranslated into Arabic, Dajani was vilified as a "traitor" and "collaborator" by some Palestinians. Al-Quds University issued a statement saying Dajani and the students were acting in a "personal capacity", and the faculty union expelled Dajani. On May 18, he submitted a letter of resignation, "hoping the university authorities would reject it and denounce the campaign against him. Instead, he received a response from the university personnel department that his resignation would take effect on June 1."

In January 2015, Dajani's car was set on fire and destroyed in front of his home. Dajani told The Times of Israel that the attack saddened him more than it frightened him. Later that year, he moved to Washington, D.C., where he served as a fellow at the Washington Institute for Near East Policy.

In September 2016, Dajani told Haaretz he was moving back to Jerusalem and that he was "hoping and thinking about organizing" another trip to Auschwitz, but he didn't want the details published.

== See also ==
- List of peace activists

== Published works ==
=== Books ===
- The Meaning of Kahlil Gibran (Secaucus, N. J.: Citadel Press, 1982)
- Economic Sanctions: Ideals and Experiences (London: Routledge and Kegan Paul, 1983) with M. S. Dajani
- Economic Diplomacy: Embargo Leverage and World Politics (Boulder, Colo.: Westview Press, 1985) with M. S. Dajani
- Politics: Theories and Concepts (in Arabic) (Amman: Palomino Press, 1986) with M. S. Dajani
- An Introduction to the Jordanian Political System (in Arabic) (Amman: Palomino Press, 1993) with M. S. Dajani
- Democracy in Palestine: Palestinian General Elections 1996 (in Arabic) (Ramallah, Palestine: Palestinian Central Elections Committee, 1997)
- Research Methodology in Political Science (in Arabic) (Jerusalem: Al-Quds University and Palestinian Center for regional Studies, 1997) with M. S. Dajani
- Democracy and Political Pluralism (in Arabic) (Al-Bireh: Palestinian Center for Regional Studies, 1998) with M. S. Dajani
- Palestine: The Holy Land (PECDAR: Emerezian Press, 2000)
- Al-Quds Glossary for International Terms (in Arabic) (Jerusalem: Palestinian Center for Regional Studies, 2001)
- Governance and Administration (in Arabic) (Jerusalem: Al-Quds University, 2001) with M. S. Dajani
- The Strategy of Palestinian Monetary Policy (Jerusalem: Israel/Palestine Center for Research and Information, 2001) with others
- Yes PM: Years of Experience in Strategies for Peace Making, Looking at Israeli-Palestinian People-to-People Activities, 1993-2002 (Jerusalem: IPCRI – Israel/Palestine Center for Research and Information, 2002) with Raviv Schwartz
- Biblographia Al-Quds (Jerusalem Bibliography) (in Arabic) (Jerusalem: Al-Quds University, 2003)
- Wasatia (in Arabic) (Jerusalem: Wasatia Publications, 2007)
- Wasatia: From Theory to Practice (in Arabic) (Jerusalem: Wasatia Publications, 2008)
- A Bibliography of Arab Books on American Affairs (in Arabic) (Jerusalem: Al-Quds University, 2009)
- Introduction to Political Science (is Arabic) (Jerusalem: Al-Quds University, 2009)
- Wasatia: The Spirit of Islam (in Arabic) (Jerusalem: Wasatia Publications, 2009)
- Jerusalem from the Lens of Wasatia (Jerusalem: Wasatia Publishing, 2010) with others
- Readings in American Democratic Culture (Jerusalem: Al-Quds University, 2010) with other editors

HOLOCAUST: HUMAN AGONY: IS THERE A WAY OUT OF VIOLENCE.With Zeina Barakat and Martin Rau. Jerusalem: Dar al-Mishkat Publishing, 2012. (in Arabic); EXPLORING AMERICAN STUDIES: A SUCCESS STORY. Jerusalem: Al-Quds University, 20123. DAJANI GLOSSARY OF ISLAMIC TERMS. Jerusalem, Wasatia Publishing, 2015. THE HOLY BOOKS AS GUIDING LIGHTS. Jerusalem, Wasatia Publishing, 2015. TEACHING EMPATHY AND RECONCILIATION IN MIDST OF CONFLICT. Jerusalem: Wasatia Press, 2016.

=== Articles ===
- with M. S. Dajani. "The Control of Oil by John Blair, A Review Article". India Quarterly, Vol. 39, No.1 (January 1983), pp. 79–82.
- with M. S. Dajani. "Sanctions: The Falklands Episode". The World Today, Vol.39, No.4 (April 1983), pp. 150–160. JSTOR 40395502
- with M. S. Dajani. "Contending Approaches to Social Change and Political Development: A Comparative Analysis". The Indian Political Science Review, Vol. 17, No. 2 (July 1983), pp. 117–130.
- with M. S. Dajani. "The 1967 Oil Embargo Revisited". Journal of Palestine Studies, Vol. 13, No. 2 (Winter 1984), pp. 65–90. doi:10.2307/2536897
- with M. S. Dajani. "Exploring at the Fringes: The Bibliography as Data Base". Teaching Political Science, Vol. 11, No. 3 (Spring 1984), pp. 106–109. doi:10.1080/00922013.1984.9942363
- with M. S. Dajani. "Contending Theories in International Relations: Marxism and Realism in World Perspectives". The Indian Political Science Review, Vol. 19, No. 1&2 (January–December 1985), pp. 73–90.
- with M. S. Dajani. "Poland: The Politactics of Sanctions". The Polish Review, Vol. 30, No. 2 (1985), pp. 149–166. JSTOR 25778127
- with M. S. Dajani. "New Frontiers in the Search for Peace: The Saudi Initiative". International Studies, Vol. 23, No. 1 (January–March 1986), pp. 63–74. doi:10.1177/0020881786023001004
- with M. S. Dajani. "Religion and the State: Islam in the Contemporary World". Orbis, Vol. 33, No. 2 (1989), pp. 1–12.
- with Barry Feinstein. "Permeable Fences Make Good Neighbors: Improving a Seemingly Intractable Border Conflict Between Israelis and Palestinians". Archived 2019-01-08 at the Wayback Machine American University International Law Review, Vol. 16, No. 1 (2000), pp. 1–176.
- "Press Reporting During the Intifada: Palestinian Coverage of Jenin". Archived 2017-09-08 at the Wayback Machine Palestine–Israel Journal, Vol. 10, No. 2 (June 2003).

=== Interviews ===
- Al-Wasatia: Reviving the Palestinian Peace Camp | an interview with Professor Mohammed Dajani Daoudi. Fathom, February 2020. Archived at the Wayback Machine Al-Wasatia: Reviving the Palestinian Peace Camp
