= Ad-Deirat =

Palestinian village

Ad-Deirat الديرات (Arabic)

Arabic transcription(s)
  - Arabic: الدّيرات
- Location of Ad-Deirat within Palestine
- Coordinates: 31°26′38.9364″N 35°9′47.1456″E
- Palestine grid: 163/094
- State: State of Palestine
- Governorate: Hebron

Government
  - Type: Village

Area
  - Total: 10,000 dunams (10 km^{2}; 3.9 sq mi)

Population (2007)
  - Total: 435
  - Density: 44/km^{2} (110/sq mi)

Ad-Deirat (Arabic: الديرات), is a village on the outskirts of Yatta in the Palestinian Hebron Governorate. It is part of the Khalet al-Maiyya village cluster, 11 km to the southeast of Hebron in the southern part of the West Bank. It was occupied in 1967.

== Geography and borders ==
It is bordered by:

- Bani Na'im village to the East.
- Ar Rifa'iyya village to the North.
- Umm Lasafa village in the West.
- Yatta Bedouin in Masafer Yatta in the South.

== Population ==
In 2007, the population of Ad-Deirat was estimated at 435 people according to the Palestinian Central Bureau of Statistics.
