= Ministry of Labor (Palestine) =

Government ministry of Palestine

- وزارة العمل الفلسطينية

Agency overview
- Formed: 1994
- Jurisdiction: Government of Palestine
- Headquarters: Ramallah, Palestine
- Minister responsible: Enas Dahadha Attari, Minister of Labor
- Website: mol.ps

The Ministry of Labor is a government agency in the State of Palestine established in 1994, responsible for labor and employment issues. Its mission is to create a favourable work environment, promote social justice, protect the rights of workers, and ensure that employers comply with labor laws and regulations. Enas Dahadha Attari is the current Minister of Labor.

== Functions ==
The Ministry of Labor of Palestine is responsible for the following key functions:

- Developing policies and strategies related to labor and employment.
- Administering labor laws and regulations, and ensuring compliance with them.
- Providing employment services, including job placement and vocational training.
- Protecting workers' rights and ensuring fair working conditions.
- Regulating the labor market and addressing issues related to labor mobility.
- Ensuring workplace safety and health, and preventing occupational hazards.
- Addressing the needs of vulnerable groups in the labor market, such as women, youth, and people with disabilities.

== List of ministers ==
#	Name	Party	Government	Term start	Term end	Notes
1	Samir Ghawshah	Palestinian Popular; Struggle Front	1, 2	5 July 1994	9 August 1998	
2	Rafiq Al-Natsheh	Fatah	3	9 August 1998	13 June 2002	
3	Ghassan Khatib	Palestinian People's Party	4, 5, 6	13 June 2002	7 October 2003	
4	Naim Abu al-Hummus	Fatah	7	7 October 2003	12 November 2003	
(3)	Ghassan Khatib	Palestinian People's Party	8	12 November 2003	24 February 2005	
5	Hasan Abu-Libdeh	Fatah	9	24 February 2005	29 March 2006	
6	Mohammad Barghouti	Hamas	10	29 March 2006	17 March 2007	
7	Mahmoud Aloul	Fatah	11	17 March 2007	14 June 2007	
8	Samir Abdullah	Independent	12	14 June 2007	19 May 2009	
9	Ahmed Majdalani	Palestinian Popular; Struggle Front	13, 14, 15, 16	19 May 2009	2 June 2014	
10	Mamoun Abu Shahla	Independent	17	2 June 2014	13 April 2019	
11	Nasri Abu Jaish	Palestinian People's Party	18	13 April 2019	31 March 2024	
12	Enas Dahadha Attari	Independent	19	31 March 2024	Incumbent	
