= Umm Lasafa =

Umm Lasafa Arabic: أم لصفا
- Umm Lasafa
- Location of Umm Lasafa within Palestine
- Country: Palestine
- Governorate: Hebron Governorate

Population (2007)
  - Total: 854

Umm Lasafa is a Palestinian village in the Hebron Governorate, located southeast of Yatta, in the southern West Bank.

== Geography ==
It is bordered to the north by the villages of Ad-Deirat and Ar-Rifa'iyya, to the east by Bedouin communities, to the south by the town of al-Karmil, and to the west by the village of Khalet al-Maiyya.

== Population ==
The population of Umm Lasafa in 2007 was approximately 854, according to the Palestinian Central Bureau of Statistics.

== See also ==
- Hebron Governorate
