= Embassy of Palestine, Islamabad =

Diplomatic mission of the State of Palestine in Pakistan

Embassy of Palestine, Islamabad سفارة دولة فلسطين لدى باكستان
- Location: Islamabad, Pakistan
- Address: Plot # 4, Block 11 Diplomatic Enclave-II G-5, Islamabad.
- Coordinates: 33°44′00.2″N 73°07′48.6″E
- Ambassador: Ahmad Rabaie

The Embassy of Palestine in Islamabad (Urdu: فلسطینی سفارتخانہ، اسلام آباد; Arabic: سفارة دولة فلسطين لدى باكستان) is the diplomatic mission of the State of Palestine in Pakistan. The present Palestinian Ambassador to Pakistan is Ahmad Rabaie

== Location ==
The embassy is located at Plot # 4, Block 11 Diplomatic Enclave-II G-5, Islamabad, accessible by the Diplomatic Enclave.

== History ==
During the previous decades, the Palestine Liberation Organization (PLO) maintained diplomatic missions in Karachi and Islamabad. The missions received full diplomatic recognition in 1975.

Following the state visit of President Mahmoud Abbas to Islamabad in February 2013 where he met President Asif Ali Zardari, Pakistan pledged a grant of $1 million for the construction of a new Palestinian embassy to be located inside the Diplomatic Enclave of Islamabad. The cheque was presented by Foreign Secretary Jalil Abbas Jilani to the Palestinian ambassador, Walid Abu Ali. Jilani stated that the grant was "one of the many gestures presented by Pakistan to express their solidarity with the people of Palestine". Pakistan also voiced support for Palestine at the United Nations General Assembly. The foundation stone of the embassy was laid during Abbas' visit.

== Consular services ==
The embassy provides services to the Palestinian community in Pakistan, as well as promoting bilateral relations and trade between the two states and managing other Palestinian interests in the country. Consular services offered include attestations, power of attorney documentation, and passport renewals and applications. The embassy operates from Monday to Friday on daytime and afternoon hours.

== See also ==
- Pakistan–Palestine relations
- List of diplomatic missions of Palestine
- List of diplomatic missions in Pakistan
