= Mohammad Barghouti =

Palestinian politician

- محمد برغوثي

Minister of Local Government
- In office 17 March 2007 – 14 June 2007
- President: Mahmoud Abbas
- Prime Minister: Ismail Haniyeh
- Preceded by: Issa al-Jabari
- Succeeded by: Ziad al-Bandak

Minister of Labour
- In office 29 March 2006 – 17 March 2007
- President: Mahmoud Abbas
- Prime Minister: Ismail Haniyeh
- Preceded by: Hasan Abu-Libdeh
- Succeeded by: Mahmoud Aloul

Personal details
- Born: 1968 (age 57–58) Kobar, Palestine
- Party: Hamas
- Education: Al-Quds University (bachelor's); An-Najah National University (master's)
- Occupation: Politician

Mohammad Barghouti (Arabic: محمد برغوثي; born 1968) is a Palestinian politician. He served as the Minister of Labour in the first Haniyeh government and as the Minister of Local Government in the second Haniyeh government.

Barghouti was arrested by Israel on 29 June 2006 as part of Israel's Operation Summer Rains. Bargouti was on his way to a village north of Ramallah when his car was stopped by jeeps and placed under arrest. He was released on 14 August 2006.

Political offices
Preceded by Hasan Abu-Libdeh	Minister of Labour; 2006–2007	Succeeded by Mahmoud Aloul
Preceded by Issa al-Jabari	Minister of Local Government; 2007	Succeeded by Ziad al-Bandak
