= Majdi al-Saleh =

Palestinian politician (born 1963)

- مجدي الصالح

Minister of Local Government
- In office 13 April 2019 – 31 March 2024
- Prime Minister: Mohammad Shtayyeh
- Preceded by: Hussein al-Araj
- Succeeded by: Sami Hijjawi

Personal details
- Born: 1 April 1963 (age 63) Nablus, Palestine
- Party: Independent
- Education: University of Damascus
- Profession: Politician, civil engineer

Majdi al-Saleh (Arabic: مجدي الصالح; born 1 April 1963) is a Palestinian politician and civil engineer who served as the Minister of Local Government from 13 April 2019 to 31 March 2024 in the Shtayyeh Government.

== Early life and education ==
He was born on 1 April 1963 near Nablus. He earned his bachelor's degree in Civil Engineering from the University of Damascus in Syria.

== Career ==
Al-Saleh, an engineer by profession, had a background in the private sector prior to his notable roles in Palestinian organizations. He was the founder of the General Union of Palestinian Contractors and went on to be elected as the Secretary General of the Palestinian General Federation of Engineers. Additionally, he held the position of head of the Engineer's Syndicate.

In April 2019, Majdi al-Saleh assumed the position of Minister of Local Government in the Palestinian Authority (PA) government led by Mohammad Shtayyeh. Notably, he is a member of the Palestinian Central Council (PCC).

Al-Saleh possesses extensive experience in overseeing and executing infrastructure projects. He has played a crucial role in offering support and guidance to various local government institutions, including municipalities, village councils, and other local authorities as Minister of Local Government.

Political offices
Preceded by Hussein al-Araj	Minister of Local Government; 2019–2024	Succeeded by Sami Hijjawi
