= Munther Dajani Daoudi =

Palestinian university administrator

Munther Dajani
- منذر سليمان الدجاني الداوودي
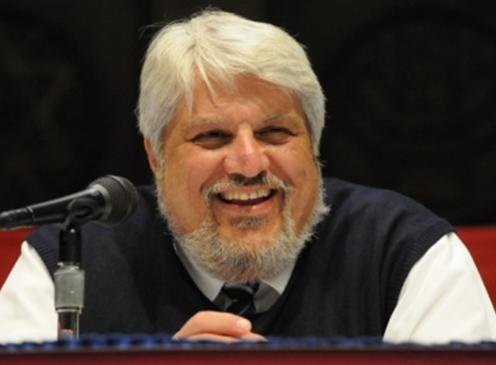
- Born: 22 February 1951 (age 75); Jerusalem, Jordanian West Bank
- Occupation: Dean at Al Quds Bard Honors College

Munther Suleiman Dajani Daoudi (Arabic: منذر سليمان الدجاني الداوودي, born 22 February 1951) is Dean at Al Quds Bard Honors College and former Dean of the Faculty of Arts at Al-Quds University in Jerusalem and Director of the Issam Sartawi Center for the Advancement of Peace and Democracy. He is also the co-founder of the Wasatiyya ("Moderation") a movement committed to finding alternatives to extremism on both sides of the Israeli-Palestinian conflict. He has written extensively on Palestinian issues, as well as on economics and democracy. Between 1996 and 1997, he served as the Director General of the Palestinian Ministry of Economy and Trade. Subsequently, he assumed the role of Director of Research at the Palestinian Centre for Regional Studies.

== Personal life ==
Dajani was born in the ancient city of Jerusalem in Souk el Bazar on February 22, 1951. His parents where Sulieman Dajani and Abla Aweidah. He is the youngest of four, two brothers Mohammed and Muhsen, and sister May.

The Dajani family is one of the prominent five families of Jerusalem and has been the custodians of Prophet David's Tomb on Mount Zion for eight hundred years.

== Education ==
Dajani commenced his schooling at the Friends School in Ramallah and then attended Victory College in Ma'adi, Egypt, before finishing his education at St George's School in Jerusalem. During his formative years, he experienced several significant wars in the region and lived under occupation until he migrated from Palestine to further his education in the United States.

In 1974, he obtained a B.Sc. degree in Management Systems and Social Sciences. The following year, he received a master's degree encompassing Social Studies, Economics, History, and Political Sciences. He achieved another master's degree in 1981, and in 1982, by the time he finished his Doctoral degree dissertation on Initiative for Peace in the Middle East: Conflict and Conflict Resolution, he and his elder brother Mohammed had two manuscripts at major publishing houses: Routledge, in London, where they published their first book in 1983, Economic Sanctions: Ideal and Experience, and Westview Press, in Colorado, where they published their second book on the Arab oil embargo.

== Career ==
Later on he moved to Amman, Jordan and joined the University of Jordan in Amman where he published more than five books and several articles. He served in different capacities at the university and outside.

In 1995, upon his father's death from cancer, Dajani left Jordan with his wife and three children to move back and settle in Jerusalem, where he became a peace activist and a public servant as the Director General of the Ministry of Economy and Trade in Palestine. In the meantime, he was appointed Director of the Palestinian Centre for Regional Studies (Pal-CRS), and he also taught as part-time Professor at both Birzeit University and Al Quds University until 1999.

Dajani resigned from three positions in PNA (Palestinian National Authority) to go back to teaching. In 1999, he joined Al Quds University as Professor and Chair of the Political Science Department, which he founded. Also served as Director of the Issam Sartawi Centre for the Advancement of Peace. During this time, he participated in tens of conferences on the Peace Process, he was involved in second track diplomacy as a group of academics began to meet to overcome some of the complicated problems, and he was awarded several Medals and Awards' certificates by many International and regional organizations.

In January 2006, he was knighted by the Italian President. Later that year in November, he attended the 28th World Federation Japanese Religionists Conference for World Peace in Tokyo, where he concluded that "The Palestinians have to give up their big dream of historical Palestine and to accept the 1967 borders for their State. Similarly, the Israelis have to give up their dream of Greater Israel and to accept the land of Israel to be within the 1948 borders." Two years later, in April 2008, he was one of the main speakers at the Doha Debates: "This House believes the Palestinians risk becoming their own worst enemy" in Qatar.

Currently, Dr. Dajani is a professor of Political Science and Dean of the Faculty of Arts at Al Quds University. On August 10, 2010, he was recommended for his work by colleague Samira Barghouthi, the Vice President of International Cooperation at the university, for being an exceptional speaker on issues in the fields of Humanities. "I heard him a few times speaking about the politics in the Middle East and it was fascinating how he blends the presentation of facts, analyses the possible future solutions, and ties everything to history in a subtle way," she says "Munther is the most caring Dean as he treats both students and Faculty with the utmost respect and patience."

== See also ==
Wasatiyyah Institute Malaysia
