= Palestinians in Pakistan =

Palestinians in Pakistan الفلسطينيون في باكستان
Regions with significant populations
- Karachi · Islamabad · Lahore

Languages
- Arabic (Palestinian Arabic) · English (Pakistani English) · Urdu · other Palestinian languages

Religion
- Predominantly Islam (mostly Sunni), with a very small minority of Christianity (Christian Palestinians)

Related ethnic groups
- Other Palestinian diaspora, Arabs in Pakistan

Palestinians in Pakistan (Arabic: الفلسطينيون في باكستان) once comprised a population of 8,000 during the 1970s. Now, however, the community has considerably grown to figures ranging between 40,000 and 50,000. Most Palestinians found in Pakistan are most commonly students of medicine and engineering, seeking education in various universities and institutions across the country such as Karachi, Lahore, Hyderabad, Quetta and Multan. Settled families on the other hand, are primarily based in Islamabad and Karachi.

The recent years have shown an increase in the number of Palestinians migrating to the country, as students increasingly opt to complete undergraduate degrees in Universities in Islamabad and Karachi. Pakistani government reserves 50 seats for Palestinian students in each major university across the country: 13 are for medicine, 4 for dentistry, 23 for engineering, and 10 for pharmacy. Eight scholarships are also offered. Over 45,000 Palestinian students have graduated from universities and institutes in Pakistan.

== History ==
From the post Zulfiqar Bhutto-era of the 1970s, Palestinian families settled across Pakistan in large numbers, as many seats and employment opportunities were offered to students and professionals. After the 1990s however, tougher-implemented foreign policies restricted the open mass-migration patterns and only a limited number of people entered the country. During the Afghan-Russian Cold War, there were numerous Palestinians who took aid and shelter in Pakistan while fighting alongside the U.S.-backed guerillas against the Soviet Union. A particular incident citing the presence of these fighters was the November 24, 1989 Peshawar car bomb-explosion, which killed three Palestinians who had lived in Pakistan (including Abdullah Yusuf Azzam) for 15 months, embroiled in Afghanistan's decade-old war, fighting on the side of anti-Communist guerrillas.

There is an organisation of Palestinian students, called the General Union of Palestinian Students (Islamabad).

The Pakistan Military's academy's foreign gentlemen batch also includes Palestinians among other nationalities.

== See also ==
- Pakistan–Palestine relations
- Arabs in Pakistan
- Pan Am Flight 73 -a scheduled Pan-Am flight through Karachi to New York hijacked by Palestinian militants.
- Embassy of Palestine, Islamabad
