= Wasatiyyah Institute Malaysia =

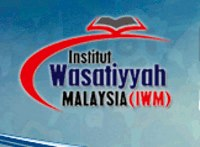
- Founded: 2012
- Founder: Malaysian Government
- Type: Non-Profit Education Centre
- Purpose: Promoting Education and Thinking Based on the Wasatiyyah @ Moderation Concept
- Region served: Malaysia and South East Asia
- Volunteers: 1,000 person

Wasatiyyah Institute Malaysia (Malay: Institut Wasatiyyah Malaysia) was an idea conjured by the former Malaysian Prime Minister YAB Dato' Sri Mohd. Najib Bn Tun Abdul Razak to fend off extremism in the religion of Islam. The institute will stand as one of the main platforms to promote moderation and harmony in Islam and to ensure modern Muslims adhere to the real message of Muhammad The Prophet as to spread love and peace throughout the world.

The institute will interact with Muslim professionals, community leaders, scholars, students, non government organisation and the masses to spread the word of peace and moderation as the basis of Islamic teachings. It is also said that the institution is an alternative to combat terrorism and extremism that has been a plague in the Muslim world for so long.

== Objective of the organisation ==
To ensure that the Malaysian People understands and practice the concept of wasatiyya in moderation in their everyday lives. To promote the sense of respect towards the idea of democracy, rules and laws, education, honour and pride and also social justice. The institute will also focus on communication and sending messages public about issues pertaining the Islamic faith and education.

The institute will frequently organise events to invite religious scholars from all over the world to educate and rehabilitate certain aspects of the religion that may have been tainted with ideologies that are not coherent with the Islamic religion.

The institute also acknowledge that there are growing needs for reform in the current understanding of Islam, to fend off extremism. The institute has devised a plan to enhance the real Islamic understanding among the Muslim population in Malaysia and also the South East Asian region.

== Board of directors ==
Patron: YAB Dato' Sri Mohd Najib Bin Tun Hj Abd Razak

Chairman: YB Dato' Seri Dr Abdullah Bin Md Zain

Director: YBHG Tuan Haji Mohd Yusof Din

Board Members: Dato' Akmar Hisham Mokhles

== Malay Archipelago Seminar: Islam in South East Asia ==
From 18 to 20 January FELDA, with the co-operation of Persatuan Generasi Bestari and MYKMU, organised a seminar focusing on "Islam in South East Asia" located in Kuala Lumpur, Malaysia. The event was attended by Muslim representatives from all over Southeast Asia. Its main mission is to discuss issues pertaining the development of Islam in the South East Asian region.

Using the slogan "Hope And Challenges" the seminar hoped to initiate changes in the continuing the survival of Muslims in South East Asia.

=== Research presenters ===
- Zakaryya Adam; Cambodia
- Ali Mustafa Bin Yakub; Indonesia
- Muhammad Hussin Bin Mutalib; Singapore
- Mohiyuddin Solaiman; Myanmar
- Zainal Bin Kling; Malaysia
- Murad Ebrahim; Philippines
- Ahmad Omar Chapakia; Thailand

=== Controversy during the seminar ===
During the seminar, a research presenter from Singapore, Muhammad Hussin Bin Mutalib explicitly stated that Singaporean Muslims were better off than Muslims in other countries.

One of the participants, Ahmad Shafie Ahmad Hambali, stood up and questioned Muhammad Hussin for giving that statement. Another participant ensued with full support from the crowd.

However, some of the participants questioned Ahmad Shafie Ahmad Hambali's attacks on Muhammad Hussin. One participant stated that even though Muhammad Hussin's facts were wrong, he must be respected as a presenter of the seminar and also as a fellow Muslim.

== See also ==
- Munther Dajani Daoudi
