= Mahmoud Aloul =

Palestinian politician (born 1950)

- محمود العالول
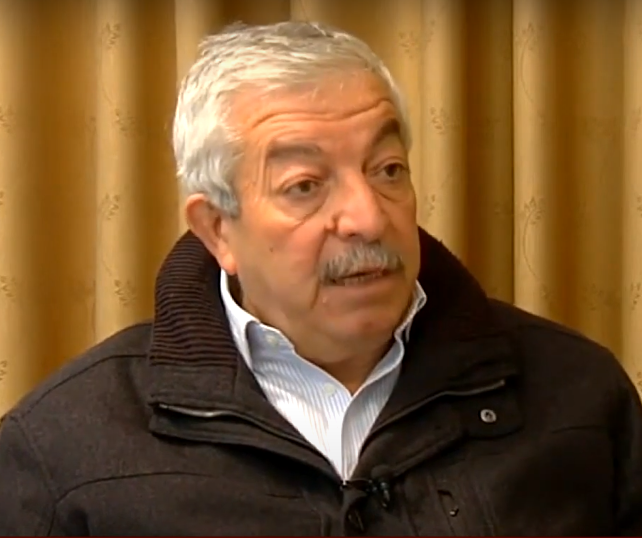
- Al-Aloul in 2020

Vice Chairman of Central Committee of Fatah
- In office 15 February 2017 – 3 June 2026
- President: Mahmoud Abbas
- Preceded by: Position established
- Succeeded by: Hussein al-Sheikh

Member of Central Committee of Fatah
- Incumbent
- Assumed office August 2009

Minister of Labour
- In office 17 March 2007 – 14 June 2007
- President: Mahmoud Abbas
- Prime Minister: Ismail Haniyeh
- Preceded by: Mohammad Barghouti
- Succeeded by: Samir Abdullah

Member of the Palestinian Legislative Council for Nablus Governorate
- Incumbent
- Assumed office 18 February 2006

Governor of Nablus Governorate
- In office 1995 – 15 December 2005
- President: Yasser Arafat
- Preceded by: Office established
- Succeeded by: Saeed Abu Ali

Personal details
- Born: 11 December 1950 (age 75) Nablus, Jordanian-administered West Bank, Palestine
- Party: Fatah
- Education: Beirut Arab University (BA)
- Profession: Politician, activist

Mahmoud Aloul (Arabic: محمود العالول) (born 11 December 1950) is a Palestinian politician who formerly served as the governor of Nablus Governorate in the Palestinian Authority in the Central Highlands of the West Bank from 1995 to 2005. Aloul was elected to the Central Committee of Fatah in August 2009 during the 6th General Conference, and later became Vice Chairman following the 7th General Conference held in 2016.

In early 2018, he was widely discussed as the likely successor to Mahmoud Abbas as President of the Palestinian National Authority. After the Six-Day War, Aloul was arrested by Israel and sent to live in Jordan, where he joined Fatah. He rose within Fatah, and, in the 1970s, moved to Lebanon. There he served under Khalil al-Wazir, as commander of a Fatah brigade that captured eight Israeli soldiers in 1983. The Israeli prisoners were exchanged for Palestinian prisoners in Israeli hands.
