= Nasri Abu Jaish =

Palestinian dentist, diplomat and politician

Nasri Abu Jaish Abu Jaish

Minister of Labour
- In office 13 April 2019 – 31 March 2024
- Prime Minister: Muhammad Shtayyeh
- Preceded by: Mamoun Abu Shahla

Ambassador of Palestine to Turkey
- Incumbent
- Assumed office 6 October 2025

Personal details
- Born: April 20, 1967 (age 59) Beit Dajan, Nablus Governorate, West Bank
- Education: University of Dar es Salaam, Harari, Sofia
- Profession: Dentist, politician, diplomat, lecturer

Nasri Abu Jaish Abu Jaish (Arabic: نصري خليل سليم أبو جيش; born 20 April 1967) is a Palestinian dentist, politician, diplomat and lecturer who holds a PhD in developmental studies and political science. He is the Labor Minister in the 18th Palestinian government. He is a member of the Palestinian National Council.

== Background ==
Nasri Khalil Salim was born in the village of Beit Dajan in Nablus Governorate in the West Bank on 20 April 1967, where he received his elementary and preparatory education in the village schools, and secondary in the Qadri Touqan School in Nablus. Then he began his university education in Sofia to obtain a bachelor's degree in dentistry, and later obtained a diploma in protocol from Jakarta. Nasri Abu Jaish completed his university studies at the University of Dar es Salaam in Tanzania to obtain a master's degree in international relations, as well as a doctorate in development studies and political science from the universities of Dar es Salaam and Harari.

== Positions ==
Nasri Abu Jaish held the position of ambassador to several African states, with residence in Tanzania and concurrently accredited to Seychelles, Mauritius, Ethiopia, Kenya, and Uganda. On 13 April 2019, Abu Jaish was sworn in front of Palestinian President Mahmoud Abbas as Minister of Labor in the government of Muhammad Shtayyeh.
