= Akmar Hisham =

Malaysian bureaucrat

Yang Berbahagia Datuk Akmar Hisham Bin Mohd Yusof @ Mokhles

Press secretary to the prime minister of Malaysia
- Incumbent
- Assumed office 16 September 2009

Personal details
- Born: 1 January 1971 (age 55) Parit, Perak

Datuk Akmar Hisham Bin Mohd Yusof @ Mokhles (born 1972) is the press secretary for the prime minister of Malaysia. Akmar Hisham is also a member of the advisory panel for Wasatiyyah Institute Malaysia which promotes moderate Islamic values. He is also involved in non-governmental and charity organization.

== Personal life ==
Akmar Hisham was born and raised in Parit, Perak, Malaysia. He is married to Datin Hazrina Binti Abdul Rahman. The couple have a daughter Aisyah Nabilah Binti Akmar Hisham.

== Education ==
A native of Parit, Perak, Akmar Hisham completed his primary and secondary education from January 1979 to December 1991 at Sekolah Rendah Kebangsaan Iskandar Shah (Primary) and later Sekolah Menengah Iskandar Shah (Secondary) both in Parit Perak. He completed his school studies after obtaining his Sijil Tinggi Persekolahan Malaysia. After that, he continued his studies in University Malaya, Kuala Lumpur from July 1992 to March 1996. He was awarded a Bachelor of Literature (Social Administration).

== Professional experience ==
Akmar Hisham started his career as a journalist for Utusan Malaysia (M) Bhd from May 1997 till September 2004.

Akmar Hisham was the press secretary for the Defence Minister (May 2004 – September 2008) and for the Finance Minister (September 2008 -September 2009) before becoming the Press Secretary for the Prime Minister (16 September 2009).

== Community activity ==
Akmar Hisham is also actively involved in community, youth and charity project. He is the Deputy President of Kelab Sahabat Bina Negara (Nation Building Club), advisor of the Kelab Eksporasi 7 Benua Malaysia (Malaysia's 7 Continent Exploration Club), Patron of the Persatuan Generasi Bestari Selangor (Selangor's Intelligent Generation Association) and Advisor of the 1 Malaysia English Channel Unity Mission. Akmar Hisham is the advisor of the Felda Everest Project 2013 and also the KE7B Felda Greenland 2014 Expedition.

== Awards and recognition ==
=== Knighthood ===
Darjah Pangkuan Seri Melaka (DPSM) which carries the title Datuk, the lowest level title compare to the English title of Sir.

=== Pingat Kedaulatan Negara ===
During the 2013 Lahad Datu standoff, Datuk Akmar Hisham Mokhles was ordered by the Malaysian Prime Minister to assist the Malaysian security forces in the said conflicts area. For his courage and valor he was conferred the Pingat Kedaulatan Negara Medal. Akmar Hisham is one of the 227 media operatives who receive the medal from the Prime Minister.

== Publications ==
2002: Magazine: Columnist for Massa magazine published by Utusan Melayu (M) Bhd

2006: Book:”Petronas Silk Road Adventure 2001: Istanbul-Putrajaya Experience The Expedition” published by Petronas Motorsports. Photographer

2007: Book:“Sehati Sejiwa Najib Tun Razak” author and coordinator.

2009: Book: “Inheriting A Legacy, Fast Tracking Change” editor.

2009: Book: “Najib Tun Razak Pewaris Kepimpinan, Pemacu Perubahan” author and editor.

2010: Book: “Najib: Beginning of A Legacy”. Commemorating One Year As Prime Minister of Malaysia. Editor

2010: Comic: “Transformasi Najib” and “Najib Transformation” author

2011: Book:“Menyelami Denyut Nadi Rakyat” author

2012: Book: “Berkongsi Denyut Nadi Rakyat” author

2013: Book: "Najib Razak: Merintis Jalan Damai" author

== Expedition ==
May 2001: Elephant Mud Hole 2: 4X4 Challenge 2001

July 2001: Petronas Silk Road Adventure 2001, Istanbul- Putrajaya

April 2004: Army Chaellenge 2004

November 2010: Cosciousco Mountain Australia

July 2011: A Step to the Earth's Roof (Everest Base Camp and Kalapatar Mountain, Nepal)

September 2012: 1Malaysia English Channel Mission.

October 2012: Ranjini Mountain Expedition, Indonesia.

March 2013: Mendaki Gunung Kinabalu

May 2013: Projek Everest Felda 2013

March 2014: Mendaki Gunung Cosciousco, Australia.

April 2014: Ekspedisi KE7B Greenland Felda 2014
