= Wafa al Bass =

Palestinian attempted suicide bomber

Wafa al Bass (Wafa al-Biss; b. 1984) is a Palestinian Arab resident of northern Gaza and a student at Al Quds University who was permitted to enter Israel for the purpose of being treated at an Israeli hospital in 2005 for burns she experienced after a gas cooker had blown up while she was making dinner. She wore a suicide bomb strapped to her legs which she planned to detonate at the hospital and attempted to explode the device after she was detained while trying to enter Israel via the Erez Crossing.

== Early life and injuries ==
Raised in the Jabalia refugee camp as one of 12 children, Al Bass described being beaten by her father and brothers. After experiencing burns from a cooking gas explosion that caused wounds covering almost half her body, Al Bass was treated at Al-Shifa Hospital, where her wounds became infected; she was given permission to enter Israel to receive hospital treatment for severe burns at Soroka Hospital in Beer Sheva. In the months before her attempted suicide mission, her family sent a message of thanks to the staff at Soroka hospital for their "great efforts and wonderful, warm attitude" in treating her.

== Attempted suicide bombing ==
Her engagement was broken after the cooking gas explosion. Her handler from the Al-Aqsa Martyrs' Brigades told her that her injuries would mean that she would never find a husband or succeed in life. Her parents encouraged her on the path of martyrdom and she recorded a video about her planned bombing in her parents' home. In terms of the decision of where to detonate her explosive device, she was given the choice of a bus, a café or the hospital where she had been treated; she selected the hospital. Her mother helped her get dressed and fixed her clothing after she put on the explosive device when heading out to a hospital appointment as part of a suicide mission. She was targeting the outpatient clinic where she was being treated and said that she was hoping to kill 30 to 50 people, including children.

On 20 June 2005, during one of her return visits, guards at the crossing became suspicious given that she was walking awkwardly, and discovered that under her traditional black robes she had strapped a 22-pound (10.0 kg) bomb to her legs. She unsuccessfully attempted to then detonate the bomb, and when questioned, she said that she hoped to explode the bomb after arriving at the hospital where she had been treated. She said "I am a member of Al Aqsa Brigades .. I believe in death."

== Release ==
She was sentenced for 12 years, but was released early in the 2011 Gilad Shalit prisoner exchange.

Upon release from prison she immediately attained further notoriety by urging Gazans to "take another Shalit" every year until all convicted Palestinian prisoners held in Israeli prisons were freed. As schoolchildren gathered at her home in northern Gaza to welcome her home, she told them, "I hope you will walk the same path we took and God willing, we will see some of you as martyrs."

In 2011, Leland Vittert interviewed al Bass in Gaza for Fox News and replayed for her the video of her arrest at the border crossing in possession of a bomb. He asked her for her thoughts on seeing it again, expecting her to have changed her perspective. Al Bass responded that she was very proud of what she did had done, that she wanted to carry out a suicide bombing and looked forward to re-experience the opportunity she had to taste and smell paradise.

== Video ==
- NBC News video La belle histoire de Wafa Al-Bass
- Fox News interview Failed Suicide Bomber Hopes for Another Chance to Kill
