= Mohiyedine Sharif =

Alleged Hamas bombmaker Palestinian militant

Mohiyedine al-Deen al-Sharif
- محيي الدين الشريف
- Mohiyedine Sharif
- Born: 5 January 1966; Beit Hanina
- Died: 29 March 1998 (aged 32); Palestine
- Cause of death: Murder / Assassination
- Alma mater: Al-Quds University
- Military career
- faction: Hamas
- Unit: Ezzedeen Al-Qassam
- Alleged attacks: Jaffa Road bus bombings; Ashkelon bus station bombing

Mohiyedine Sharif (Arabic: محيي الدين الشريف; killed 29 March 1998), also known as The Electrician, was a master bombmaker for Hamas. A protégé of Yahya Ayyash, Sharif was responsible for the First and second Jerusalem bus 18 massacres, and the Ashkelon bus station bombing.

Sharif gained a Bachelor of Arts degree in electronic engineering at the Al-Quds University. Sharif died in a car explosion near a garage in Ramallah on 29 March 1998. Many Palestinians believe that he was a victim to internal struggles between Palestinian militias.

Following his death, the Palestinian Authority arrested five members of Hamas for his killing. But Hamas said that the Preventive Security Force by its commander Jibril Rajoub killed Sharif after they arrested him.
