= Ahmad Rabaie =

Palestinian politician and diplomat

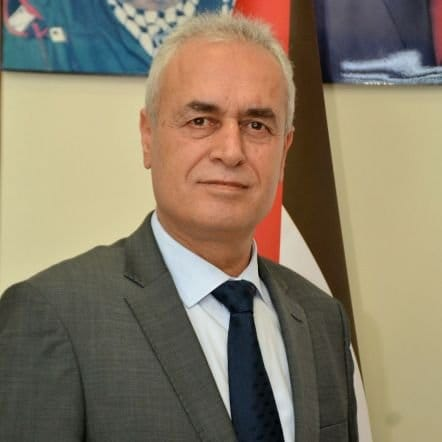
- Rabaie in 2021

Ambassador Extraordinary and Plenipotentiary of the State of Palestine to Pakistan
- In office 2019–2024

Assistant Secretary General of the Council of Arab Interior Ministers

Assistant Minister of Interior and Director General of Arab and International Relations

Personal details
- Born: 2 July 1964 (age 61) Dura, Hebron Governorate, Jordanian-administered West Bank, Palestine
- Education: PhD in Law and Political Sciences (University of Tunis El Manar, Tunisia); M.A. in Strategic Planning and State Administration (Mutah University, Hashemite Kingdom of Jordan); Diploma of Higher Studies in National Resources Management (National Defense College, Hashemite Kingdom of Jordan); B.A. in Management (Al-Quds University, Palestine); Diploma in Criminal and Security Sciences (Institute of Competency Upgrading and Capacity Development, Russian Federation); Civil Engineering (Palestine Polytechnic University)

Ahmad Rabaie (Arabic: أحمد ربعي; born 2 July 1964) is a Palestinian politician and diplomat. He was appointed as Ambassador Extraordinary of the State of Palestine to Pakistan in 2019 to 2024.

== Political and diplomatic life ==
- Appointed as Ambassador Extraordinary and Plenary of the State of Palestine to Pakistan
- Assistant Secretary General of the Council of Arab Interior Ministers
- Assistant Minister of Interior and Director General of Arab and International Relations

== Education ==
- PhD in Law and Political Sciences (University of Tunis El Manar, Tunisia).
- M.A. in Strategic Planning and State Administration (Mutah University, the Hashemite Kingdom of Jordan).
- Diploma of Higher Studies in National Resources Management (National Defense College, the Hashemite Kingdom of Jordan).
- B.A. in management (Al-Quds University, the State of Palestine).
- Diploma in Criminal and Security Sciences (Institute of Competency Upgrading and Capacity Development, the Russian Federation).
- Civil Engineering (Palestine Polytechnic University, the State of Palestine).
