= Saeed Abu Ali =

Palestinian politician and jurist (born 1955)

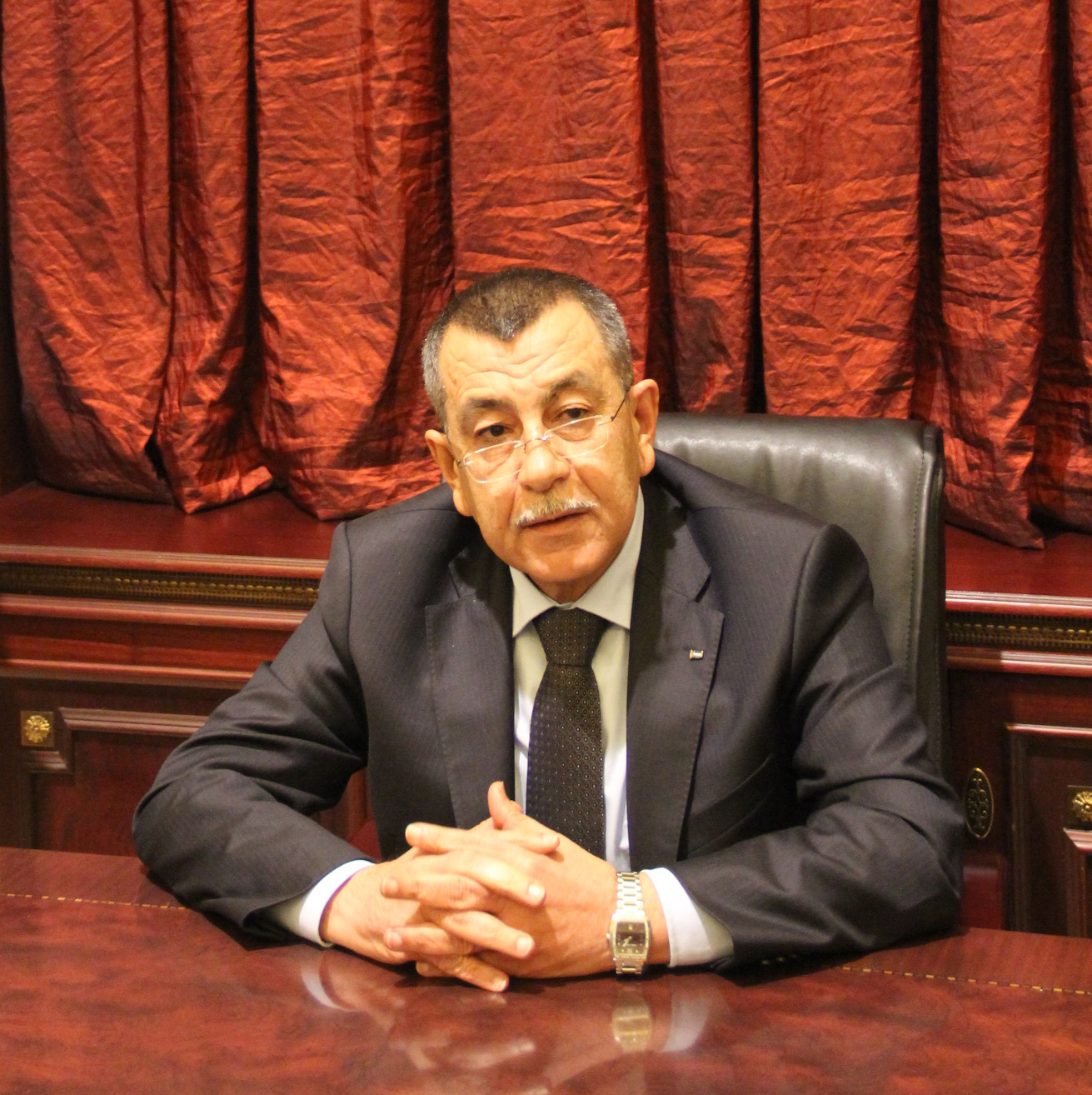

Minister of Interior
- In office 19 May 2009 – 2 June 2014
- Prime Minister: Salam Fayyad; Rami Hamdallah
- Preceded by: Abdel Razak al-Yehiyeh
- Succeeded by: Rami Hamdallah

Governor of Ramallah and Al-Bireh Governorate
- In office 10 September 2006 – May 2009
- Succeeded by: Laila Ghannam

Governor of Nablus Governorate
- In office 2005–2006
- Preceded by: Mahmoud Aloul
- Succeeded by: Kamal Sheikh

Personal details
- Born: 13 January 1955 (age 71) Jenin, All-Palestine Protectorate (present-day Palestine)
- Party: Fatah
- Children: 4
- Education: Al-Quds University; Tunis University; University of Toulouse
- Profession: Politician, jurist

Saeed Abdul Rahman Ahmed Abu Ali (Arabic: سعيد عبد الرحمن أحمد أبو علي; born 13 January 1955) is a Palestinian politician and jurist. He headed the governorates of Nablus, Ramallah and Al-Bireh. He was also the Palestinian Minister of Interior, and serves as Assistant Secretary-General of the League of Arab Nations.

== Early life and education ==
Saeed Abu Ali was born on 13 January 1955, in the Jenin Governorate, northern part of West Bank, State of Palestine. He studied law at Al-Quds University. After moving to Tunisia, he joined the Palestine Liberation Organization. He obtained a bachelor's degree in journalism and information, a master's degree in 1989 in political science and a doctorate in law in 1995. In 1992 he earned a doctorate in international organizations from University of Toulouse, France.

== Political career ==
- 1980–1984: Member of the Permanent Delegate of Palestine to the Arab League of Nations.
- 1984–1989: Director of Arab Affairs at the Palestinian Planning Center in Tunis.
- 1989–1995: Adviser to the Embassy of the Palestine Liberation Organization
- 1995–2002: Director General of the Presidential Secretariat.
- 2002–2005: Assistant Secretary of the Presidential Secretariat.
- 2005: Governor of the Ministry of the Interior and National Security and Coordinator for Governor's Affairs.
- 2005: Assistant to the Secretary General of the Presidency in the Ministry of the Interior and National Security to the Palestinian Presidency & coordinator for governorate affairs.
- 2005–2006: Governor of Nablus Governorate.
- 2006–2009: Governor of Ramallah and Al-Bireh Governorate.
- 2009–2014: Minister of Interior.

Political offices
Preceded by Abdel Razak al-Yehiyeh	Minister of Interior; 2009–2014	Succeeded by Rami Hamdallah
