= Al-Quds University Teaching Hospital =

Hospital in Jerusalem Governorate, Palestine

- Al Quds University

Geography
- Location: Jerusalem

Organisation
- Type: Teaching
- Affiliated university: Al Quds University

Services
- Beds: 700

History
- Construction started: 1994
- Opened: 2000

Al Quds University Teaching Hospital is a Palestinian healthcare foundation based in Jerusalem Governorate, Palestine. It is affiliated with the Al-Quds University and operates four facilities in Palestine. The hospital serves as a teaching hospital for medical students and provides healthcare services to the local community.

Its hospital offers a range of medical services, including outpatient clinics, inpatient care, emergency services, diagnostic imaging, laboratory services, and various specialized departments such as surgery, internal medicine, pediatrics, obstetrics and gynecology, and more. Al Quds University Teaching Hospital operates one of the largest hospital networks in Palestine, spread throughout the territory of the West Bank. The Medical Clinic is located on Abu Dies Main Campus, at the center of Al-Quds University AQU- Health Complex Building, and is staffed by registered nurses.

== History ==
Al-Quds University itself was founded in 1984 as a response to the need for higher education opportunities for Palestinians in Jerusalem. The university aimed to provide quality education in various fields, including medicine. The teaching hospital affiliated with Al-Quds University was established to complement the medical education offered by the university. It serves as a practical training ground for medical students, interns, and resident physicians, allowing them to gain hands-on experience in a clinical setting.

Oslo Accords signed between Yitzhak Rabin and Yasser Arafat, led establishment of the Palestinian National Authority, which formed the new healthcare system for Palestine. As a result, the new Al Quds University Teaching Hospital was established in 1994, based on a decree issued by Arafat. In 1998, the hospital was further equipped with many more equipment and tools. It was funded by the Arab Fund.

The Foundation for Al Quds University Medical School was formed on 3 July 1997. At that time, it was the only medical school in the entire state of Palestine. Later on, the foundation also expanded its operations in other universities of the country — An-Najah National University in Nablus and Al-Azhar University and Islamic University, both in Gaza.

Since the ongoing war in Gaza, the hospital and university have also faced many political and military issues.

== Academics ==
The hospital ranked 2nd for Biology in the Palestine. Rua Rimawi, an alumnus of the college is organizing a fundraiser program.

== See also ==
- Al-Quds University
