= Bayt Mal Al Qods Acharif Agency =

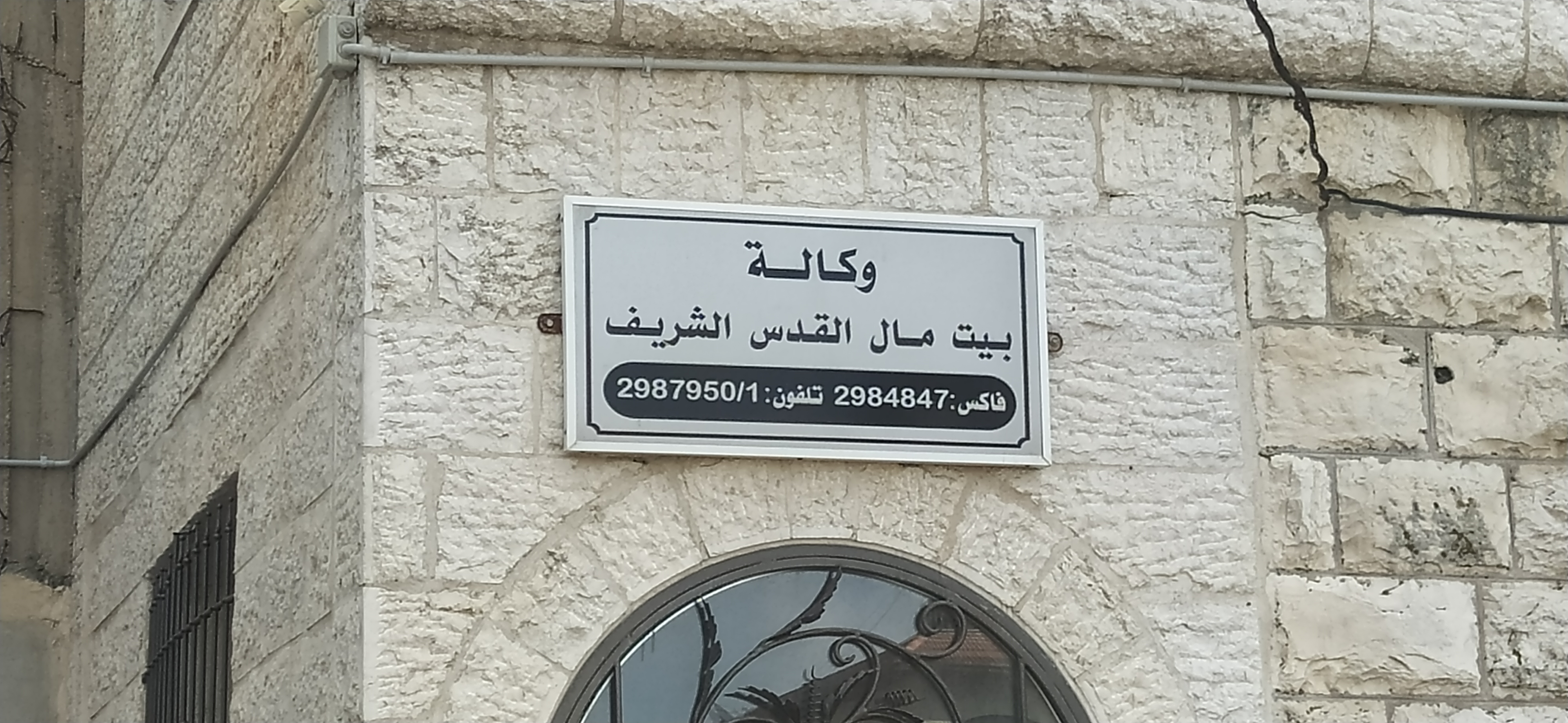
- Headquarters: Rabat, Morocco
- Region served: Al Quds
- Fields: Humanitarian and Social Support, Education, Health, Human Development
- Director: Mohamed Salem Echarkaoui
- Key people: King Mohammed VI of Morocco
- Parent organization: Al-Quds Committee
- Budget: 3.4 million dollars (2023)
- Website: www.bmaq.org

Bayt Mal Al Qods Acharif Agency (BMAQ), based in Rabat and created in 1998, is an agency whose mission is to preserve the cultural and historical heritage of the holy city of Al Quds and to support its populations. The Agency (BMAQ) reports to the Al Quds Committee, chaired by His Majesty Mohammed VI, King of Morocco.

== Activity ==
The Bayt Mal Al Qods Acharif Agency (BMAQ) is active in several areas, including the renovation and restoration of historic buildings, the development of public spaces, the protection of archaeological sites and the promotion of cultural tourism in the city of Al Quds. It is also involved in human, economic and social development projects aimed at improving the living conditions of the Palestinian population of the city.

== Management ==
The Bayt Mal Al Qods Acharif Agency (BMAQ) has an administration which is responsible for managing the organization and finances. Under the direction of the Director General, the administration draws up the Agency's action plan and reports, which it then submits to the Trusteeship Committee. For the execution of its actions in Al-Quds, the administration of the Agency is assisted by an executive and administrative team headed by the coordinator projects and programs, based in the city of Al-Quds. Similar to the international organizations, the Agency (BMAQ) uses accounting, evaluation and monitoring models to proactively and reactively evaluate its projects. To this end, it has created an observatory in Al-Quds to monitor the social situation linked to the specificity of the city. The Agency (BMAQ) regularly publishes reports that help it develop its projects according to an established order of priorities.

== Funding ==
According to article (16) of the statutes of the Bayt Mal Al Qods Acharif Agency (BMAQ), it is funded by donations from states, governments, private and public economic institutions, as well as individuals.

== History ==
The Bayt Mal Al Qods Acharif Agency (BMAQ) was created in 1998 as a non-profit institution, on the initiative of His Late Majesty King Hassan II, Chairman of the Al Quds Committee, emanating from the Organization of Islamic Cooperation (OIC), the latter had adopted this initiative aimed at preserving the Arab-Islamic rights of the sacred city, its cultural heritage and to contribute to the improvement of the living conditions of its inhabitants through the financing of programs in the field of health, education, as well as the mobilization of the financial resources of the BMAQ Agency so that it can carry out its missions.

In 2006, the Bayt Mal Al Qods Acharif Agency launched a scholarship program for Palestinian students in Jerusalem. This program aims to encourage academic excellence and support students who are experiencing financial difficulties.

In 2010, the Bayt Mal Al Qods Acharif Agency organized a festival of Palestinian culture in Rabat, the capital of Morocco. This festival included art exhibitions, film screenings, concerts and lectures.

In 2013, the BMAQ Agency decided to launch a rehabilitation project for the Al Qattanin souq, one of the main markets in the old city of Jerusalem.

In 2014, the Bayt Mal Al Qods Acharif Agency signed a partnership agreement with UNESCO for the preservation of the cultural heritage of the city of Al Quds.

In 2018, the Bayt Mal Al Qods Acharif Agency inaugurated a project to rehabilitate the wall of the old city of Al Quds, which is one of the main symbols of the city.

In 2020, the Bayt Mal Al Qods Acharif Agency launched a support program for Palestinian small businesses in Jerusalem, which have been hit hard by the COVID-19 pandemic. This program aims to help businesses survive.

In September 2021, the Agency introduces an e-commerce platform named "DLALA Marketstore". This platform will be accessible, in a spirit of solidarity, to producing entities and establishments as well as to associations of artisans in Al-Quds in order to help them sell their products.

In February 2022, the Bayt Mal Al Qods Acharif Agency and the Higher Institute of Information and Communication (ISIC) jointly decided to create the Al Quds Acharif Award for Journalistic Excellence in Development Media.

In May 2022, the Bayt Mal Al Qods Acharif Agency launched the Shireen Abu Akleh Journalism Award, as a tribute to the journalist killed by an Israeli Defense Force shot.

In September 2022, the Bayt Mal Al Qods Acharif Agency donated electronic devices and equipment to the library of Al-Aqsa Mosque. This donation includes 20 tablets, 10 laptops, a large screen TV, 3 overhead projectors, a projection screen and a mobile cart.

In January 2023, during a press conference, the BMAQ Agency announced that it had received a total of 65 million dollars of donations during its 25 years of existence: 22.3 million of donations from States (including Morocco the main contributor up to 75%), 27.1 million from institutional donations and 15.5 million from individuals'. The Bayt Mal Al Qods Acharif Agency unveiled an action plan for 2023 divided between social support, education, health and human development projects, with a budget of 3.4 million dollars.

On January 20, 2023, the Bayt Mal Al Qods Acharif Agency and the Digital Development Agency (ADD) entered into a cooperation and partnership agreement with the aim of modernizing the Agency's working methods and digitizing its administration using the technologies and digital advances available in this field.

In March 2023, the Bayt Mal Al-Quds Acharif Agency decided to organize an exhibition of Palestinian products from the city of Al-Quds, during the 1st edition of the Joint Investment Forum between Mauritania and the Organization of Islamic Cooperation (OIC).

On June 24, 2024, King Mohammed VI issued directives to launch a humanitarian operation aimed at providing medical aid to the Palestinian population in Gaza. This aid comprises forty tons of medical supplies, including burn treatment equipment, emergency surgical tools, orthopedic and fracture surgery instruments, as well as essential medications. These medical supplies are intended for both adults and young children.

== Projects ==
- Support of social sectors.
- Charity and social complex.
- Community Initiatives for Sustainable Human Development.
- Bayt Mal Al Quds Education and Training System.
- Bayt Mal Al Quds Research and Studies Center.
- Campus of Al-Quds University in Beit Hanina.
- Hospitals and health centers.
- Ramadan Action.
- The Children Club for Al Quds.
- "Arribat" Monitoring and Evaluation Observatory of the Bayt Mal Al Qods Agency.
- Commerce and marketing platform.
- Free Days Forum.
- "Al Quds Winter" Campaign.
- Reconstruction of dilapidated buildings.

== Directors ==
- 2006–2015: Abdelkebir Alaoui M'daghri.
- 2015–present: Mohamed Salem Cherkaoui.

== Partnerships ==
- Government of the Kingdom of Morocco.
- Palestinian institutions in the city of Al Quds.

== Awards ==
- G2T Global Awards 2019 – Social Action.
