= Abdel Razak al-Yehiyeh =

Palestine politician (1929–2020)

Abdel-Razak al-Yehiyeh
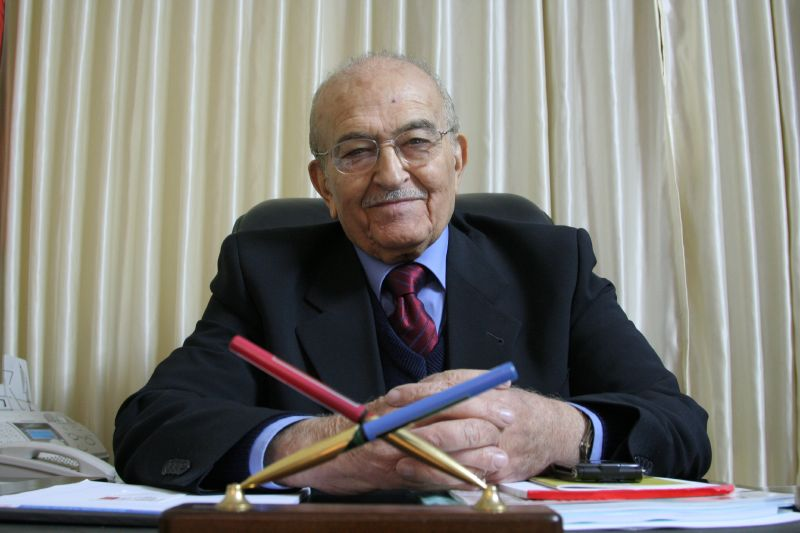

Minister of Interior
- In office 15 June 2007 – 19 May 2009
- President: Mahmoud Abbas
- Prime Minister: Salam Fayyad
- Preceded by: Ismail Haniyeh
- Succeeded by: Saeed Abu Ali
- In office 13 June 2002 – 29 October 2002
- President: Yasser Arafat
- Preceded by: Yasser Arafat
- Succeeded by: Hani al-Hassan

Personal details
- Born: 15 March 1929 Tantura, British Mandate of Palestine
- Died: 9 March 2020 (aged 90) Amman, Jordan
- Party: Fatah
- Children: 4 daughters and 1 son from his first marriage; 1 daughter and 1 son from his second marriage
- Education: Damascus University
- Occupation: Politician, military strategist, author

Abdel-Razak al-Yehiyeh or Abdul-Razzaq Al-Yahya (15 March 1929 – 9 March 2020) born in Tantura, near Haifa, then in the British Mandate of Palestine, also known as Abu Anas, was a Palestinian politician who served as Minister of Interior of the Palestinian National Authority.

Al-Yehiyeh trained as a military strategist and served as chief operations officer and then deputy chief-of-staff of the PLA brigade in Syria before 1967. In August 1968, he led an attempt to make PLA Syria brigades more independent of Syrian control, and was made PLA chief-of-staff by the Palestine Liberation Organisation (PLO) Executive Committee. But with Syria opposed, he resigned to become military advisor to the PLO Executive Committee from 1969 and chief-of-staff of the Palestinian Armed Struggle Command (PASC) in February 1969.

He was reappointed to the PLA as commander-in-chief by the PLO Executive Committee in June 1969. Then when Yasser Arafat took on that role in September 1970, al-Yehiyeh became chief-of-staff of all Palestinian forces.

Due to Syrian pressure, he was replaced in 1971, becoming director of the PLO's political department from 1971 to 1976, He was a member of the PLO Executive Committee from 1984 to 1991. Al-Yehiyeh headed security committees in talks with Israel from 1993 to 1995, including final status talks, and also headed negotiations on Hebron security arrangements and safe passage.

He was appointed as Interior Minister of the Palestinian Authority in June 2002, charged with overhauling Palestinian security forces. He was a member of the three-man delegation to Washington in August 2000. He was involved in security talks with Israel, and headed a centralized security apparatus for the Palestinian Authority.

Al-Yehiyeh left the PA cabinet in late 2002, feeling that Arafat had prevented him from making any significant reforms. He published his book Between militarism and politics in 2006, and he was working on publishing a new book about peace negotiations between the Palestinian National Authority (PNA) and Israel.

He was appointed Interior Minister on 15 June 2007.

== Personal life ==
From his first marriage, he had 4 daughters: Jomana, Lina, Roula and Rejwan. After the death of his first wife, he remarried and had a daughter Rana, and a son, Anas.

Political offices
Preceded by Yasser Arafat	Minister of Interior; 2002	Succeeded by Hani al-Hassan
Preceded by Ismail Haniyeh	Minister of Interior; 2007–2009	Succeeded by Saeed Abu Ali
