= Hussein al-Araj =

Palestinian minister

Hussein Abdallah al-Araj
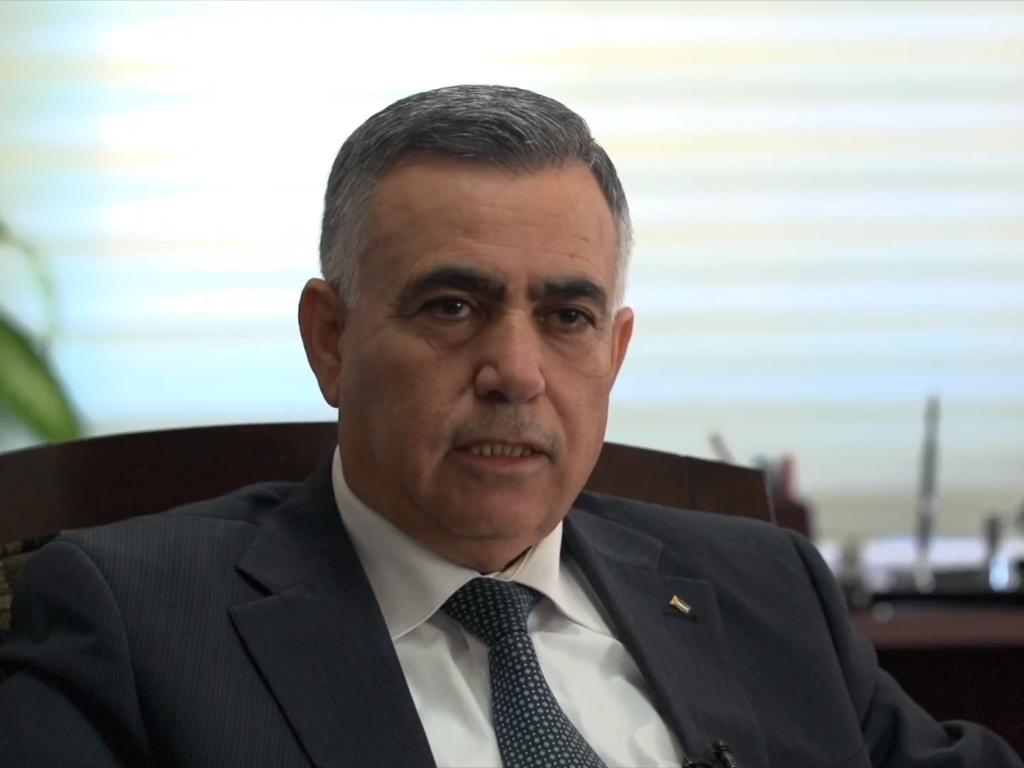

Governor of Hebron Governorate
- In office 2007–2010

Acting Mayor of Nablus
- In office April 2004 – April 2005
- Succeeded by: Ghassan Hammouz

Deputy Minister of Local Government
- In office 2004–2005
- Prime Minister: Ahmad Qurei

Hussein Abdallah al-Araj (Arabic: حسين الأعرج) is a Palestinian former mayor and government minister. He was the acting mayor of Nablus, one of the largest cities in the West Bank. He was in office, heading a local government committee, from April 2004 to April 2005. He was succeeded by another local government committee led by Ghassan Hammouz. Al-Araj was also the Palestinian National Authority's Deputy Minister of Local Government in 2004-05.

In 2005, he complained that Nablus was closed off by the Israel Defense Forces for three years and concerning the Israeli West Bank barrier, he stated "Walls don't build peace, we learned that in Berlin... face to face contact do [build peace]."
