= Pakistan–Palestine relations =

Diplomatic relations between Pakistan and the State of Palestine

- Pakistan: Palestine

Diplomatic mission
- Embassy of Palestine, Islamabad

Pakistan–Palestine relations refer to the bilateral relations between Islamic Republic of Pakistan and the State of Palestine. The State of Palestine established an embassy in Islamabad on 31 January 2017. Pakistan remains one of the most staunch supporters of a fully independent and sovereign Palestinian state, and in line with its pro-Palestinian approach, does not recognize the State of Israel (see Israel–Pakistan relations). Pakistan currently hosts between 40 to 50,000 Palestinian migrants, primarily students in Pakistani universities; and frequently provides various forms of humanitarian aid to Palestine.

Former Pakistani president and military dictator Pervez Musharraf stated that Pakistan will recognize Israel if the latter withdraws its forces from the West Bank and allows the remaining Palestinian land to continue to exist, within the Green Line that served as the international border between the occupation force, Israel, and Palestine from the First Arab–Israeli War of 1948 to the Third Arab–Israeli War of 1967 — however successive governments have rejected recognizing Israel.

The second President of Palestine, Mahmoud Abbas, has visited Pakistan three times.

== Historical relationship ==
Before the Partition of India, future founder of Pakistan Muhammad Ali Jinnah stated:

"The Muslims of India will stand solid and will help the Arabs in every way they can in the brave and just struggle that they are carrying on against all odds. May I send them a message on behalf of the All-India Muslim League - of cheer, courage and determination in their just cause and struggle, and that I am sure they will win through"

Pakistan and the Palestinian Authority have a very close and political relationship. During the 1948 Palestine War (1947–1949), Israel's diplomatic mission in Washington, D.C. received information that Pakistan was trying to provide military assistance to the Arabs, including rumors that a Pakistani battalion would be sent to Palestine to fight alongside them. Pakistan bought 250,000 rifles in Czechoslovakia that apparently were meant for the Arabs. Also, it became known that Pakistan bought three planes in Italy for the Egyptians. The Pakistan Air-Force participated in the 1967 and 1973 Arab–Israeli wars, Pakistani pilots flying Jordanian and Syrian planes downed some Israeli planes, whereas in the 1982 battle for Beirut between Israel and the PLO, fifty Pakistani volunteers serving in the PLO were taken prisoner by Israel. After the 1973 war, Pakistan and the PLO signed an agreement for training PLO officers in Pakistani military institutions. Pakistan and the Palestine Liberation Organization (PLO) had developed close ties. The PLO was first recognized as the sole legitimate representative of the Palestinians at an Islamic summit in Lahore in February 1974. This was approved six months later at an Arab summit in Rabat. PLO missions in Karachi and Islamabad (Pakistan's capital since 1960) received full diplomatic recognition in 1975. Also in 1975, Pakistan had supported and voted in favor of UN General Assembly Resolution 3379 which had equated Zionism with racism (the resolution was later revoked with Resolution 4686 but Pakistan voted against revoking it). During the First Intifada that began in 1987, pro-PLO rallies were held in Pakistan and the government sent the organization food and medical supplies. After the Palestinian Declaration of Independence on November 15, 1988, Pakistan recognized the Palestinian Authority on 16 November 1988 and had established full diplomatic relations with it by the end of 1989.

== Bilateral visits ==
The Palestinian President, Mahmoud Abbas, also paid an official visit to Pakistan in 2005, during his tour of Asia. During his stay in Islamabad, he met Pervez Musharraf who was the President of Pakistan at that time as well as the then-Prime Minister Shaukat Aziz and Senate Chairman of Pakistan, Muhammad Mian Soomro. In the meeting, he made political talks with the Pakistani leaders regarding the current situation of the Middle East and the peace process between Palestinian Authority and Israel. He also discussed about the developments in the occupied territories and the international efforts exerted so far to attain peace in the region, and to implement related agreements in addition to the support Pakistan provides to Palestinian Authority. When leaving Pakistan, Abbas said that he supports the right to self-determination of the Palestinians and the solidarity of the Arab World with the Pakistanis against the Israeli occupation of Palestine, Abbas thanked Musharraf and the people of Pakistan for their continued and devoted support to the Palestinian cause.

== Relations with Hamas ==
After the January 2006 Palestinian legislative elections, Pakistani President Pervez Musharraf called on the world to accept the choice and reality of the Palestinian people and must not shut the doors to the Palestinian people. The Palestinian Foreign Minister Mahmoud al-Zahar paid a visit to Pakistan in June 2006 and thanked Pakistan for supporting the rights of the Palestinian people. He also received $3 million in aid for the democratically elected Palestinian government from the Pakistani government.

== Gaza ==
During the 2008-2009 Israel-Gaza conflict, President Asif Ali Zardari, Prime Minister Yousuf Raza Gilani and Foreign Minister Shah Mahmood Qureshi have condemned the Israeli attacks in Gaza that killed over 1500 people on Saturday and have appealed for cessation of hostilities. President Asif Ali Zardari further said Israel's air raids on Gaza Strip have "violated the Charter of United Nations". He also urged the entire world to take swift action of Israel's raids on Gaza as it was as open violation of UN Charter. On January 11, the Permanent Representative of Pakistan to the UN, Hussain Haroon, called for an immediate ceasefire and calm. He criticised Israel saying the unrestrained use of force, scale of destruction, killing of innocent civilians, including women and children, the violation of UN safe havens, and the collective punishment of an entire people were blatant breaches of international law. He said that those act, in their totality, constituted war crimes and crimes against humanity. He also called for the end of Israel's blockade in Gaza.

Also during the 2008-2009 Israel-Gaza conflict, Pakistan's GEO News was one of the only few foreign news channels that provided exclusive coverage of the situation that was prevailing after the war, right from Gaza. The reporting hosted by the Pakistani journalist, Hamid Mir, in January 2009. After the Gaza flotilla raid on May 31, 2010, Pakistan strongly condemned the Israeli action, calling it a cruel act and an open violation of international laws and ethics. Foreign Minister Shah Mahmood Qureshi stated that "Pakistan strongly condemns this incident. Our point of view was that there was no moral or legal reason for this attack". The Pakistani government also expressed deep concern over the well-being of Pakistanis and journalists on board and Pakistani missions are in touch with Arab countries of the region to get information about the status of the Pakistani nationals in the flotilla. President of Pakistan Asif Ali Zardari and Prime Minister of Pakistan Yousuf Raza Gilani strongly condemned the Israeli actions. They further said that the Government of Pakistan is exerting all its efforts to find out what had happened to the Pakistanis aboard the flotilla. Among the people who were aboard the Gaza flotilla ship and arrested by Israeli forces during that time was Pakistani journalist Syed Talat Hussain with his producer. He was the only Pakistani journalist that time who traveled with the flotilla and garnered wide attention in Pakistani media. During the November 2012 Operation Pillar of Defense in the Gaza Strip, the Pakistani Prime Minister Raja Pervez Ashraf spoke to Egyptian President Mohamed Morsi and said that Pakistan strongly condemns Israeli air attacks in Gaza "that have targeted not only the Hamas leadership but also innocent civilians". He said Pakistan considers Israeli action as "a grave violation of international law and all humanitarian norms". He added that Israeli threats of a ground offensive against Gaza were even more disturbing. Raja also said that unless the Palestinian problem was resolved, peace in the Middle East would remain elusive. He expressed concern that the escalation in violence could lead to a spreading of conflict, which may engulf the region.

On 14 April 2012, Pakistani Delegation led by Allma Qazi Norani, Sabir Karbali, Hasnat Qadri, Arsalan Ayaz others participated in a Global road Caravan towards Jerusalem. On November 29, 2012, Pakistan voted in favor of UN General Assembly Resolution 67/19 Palestine to non-member observer state status in the United Nations. During the 2014 Israel-Gaza conflict, Prime Minister Nawaz Sharif said: "I am saddened and disappointed to note the silence of international community against this injustice, the silence and ineffectiveness of the Muslim Ummah has made Palestinians more vulnerable and made Israel more aggressive. The world must stop Israel from this naked and brutal aggression".He termed the Israeli atrocities against Palestinians in Gaza as 'genocide,' urging the world to stop Israel's naked and brutal aggression. In his Independence Day speech Prime Minister Nawaz Sharif said Israeli atrocities on Gaza citizens were no lesser a tragedy. He said the bombardment on human settlements and massacre of innocent people was a moment of thought for the world community as well as the human conscience. He said: "Pakistan strongly condemns it. The civilized world must take cognizance of the situation because it was a tragedy for the whole humanity."

During the May 2021 conflict, PM Imran Khan strongly condemned the Israeli police's attack on Palestinian worshippers at Jerusalem's Al-Aqsa Mosque. The Prime Minister Imran Khan also urged the international community to take immediate action to protect Palestinians and their legitimate rights.

In January 2026, Pakistan's Foreign Office stated that even though the country has agreed to join the Board of Peace, this does not mean it will join the Abraham Accords, as it is obligated to Palestine.

=== Support for Gaza flotillas ===
In September 2025, Pakistan expressed full support for the "Global Sumud Flotilla", a civil society initiative involving ships from more than a dozen countries aimed at delivering humanitarian aid to the Gaza Strip. The Pakistani Ministry of Foreign Affairs, along with counterparts from Bangladesh, Brazil, Colombia, Indonesia, Ireland, Libya, Malaysia, the Maldives, Mexico, Oman, Qatar, Slovenia, South Africa, Spain, and Turkey, issued a joint statement warning against any threats or unlawful actions targeting the flotilla or its participants. The statement emphasized that the fleet sought to deliver humanitarian assistance to Gaza's residents and raise awareness about the urgent need to end the blockade. Pakistan also warned that any violation of international law, such as attacks on the ships in international waters or unlawful seizures, would result in accountability.

== See also ==
- Foreign relations of Pakistan
- Foreign relations of the State of Palestine
- Israel–Pakistan relations
- Pan Am Flight 73
- Palestinians in Pakistan
