= Al-Quds University =

Public university in Palestine

Coordinates: 31°45′21.27″N 35°15′40.97″E

- جامعة القدس
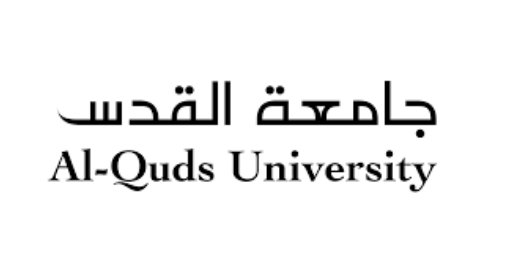
- Type: Public university
- Established: 1970
- Founder: Zuhair Al-Karmi
- Accreditation: Ministry of Education
- President: Imad Abu Kishek
- Administrative staff: 1,000
- Undergraduates: 13,000
- Postgraduates: 2,000
- Location: Abu Dis, University Street, Jerusalem Governorate, Palestine
- Campus: 47 acres (190,000 m^{2})
- Other Campus: Beit Hanina; Sheikh Jarrah; Hebron; Al Bireh
- Website: www.alquds.edu/en/

Al-Quds University (Arabic: جامعة القدس, romanized: Jāmiʿat al-Quds, lit. 'Jerusalem University') is a public university in the Jerusalem Governorate, Palestine. The main campus is located in Abu Dis town, near Jerusalem, with three more campuses in Jerusalem and other campuses in Ramallah and Hebron. It was established in 1984, by merger of more local institutions in Jerusalem.

It is one of the highly ranked universities in Palestine. In 2023, Al Quds University achieved 5–star rating in Quality Standards. The university is locally known for its innovation programs in the field of high–tech industry and collaborations. In 2017, it was ranked as "most socially responsible university" in the Arab world. In 2002, Al–Quds Medical School, the medical branch of the university, received official recognition from governing bodies in the United States and Europe.

== History ==
=== Foundation and establishment ===
The idea to establish "Al Aqsa" university in Jerusalem was proposed in 1931 but remained a concept. The occupation of West Jerusalem and the Palestinian Diaspora hindered its realization. In the 1950s, the idea was revived, but Jordan focused on establishing a university in Amman instead. The Israeli occupation of East Jerusalem further delayed the establishment of an Arab university. In the early 1970s, discussions resumed to establish a Palestinian university, resulting in the transformation of existing institutions into universities in the West Bank. Jerusalem was overlooked once again.

In the late 1970s, independent colleges were established in Jerusalem and its surroundings. The College of Daawa and Religious Principles, College of Medical Professions, and College of Science and Technology were founded in 1978 and 1979. In 1982, the College of Hind Al-Husseini for Women and the Center for Islamic Archaeology were established.

In 1984, steps were taken to unify these colleges, aiming for recognition by the Union of Arab Universities. A coordinating committee was formed, allowing the colleges to maintain their separation. The Faculty of Medicine was founded in 1994. In 1995, all colleges and faculties officially amalgamated, establishing Al-Quds University. New centers and colleges were opened or merged, offering a comprehensive range of academic programs. The university emphasized engagement with society, becoming a distinct entity.

=== Contemporary ===
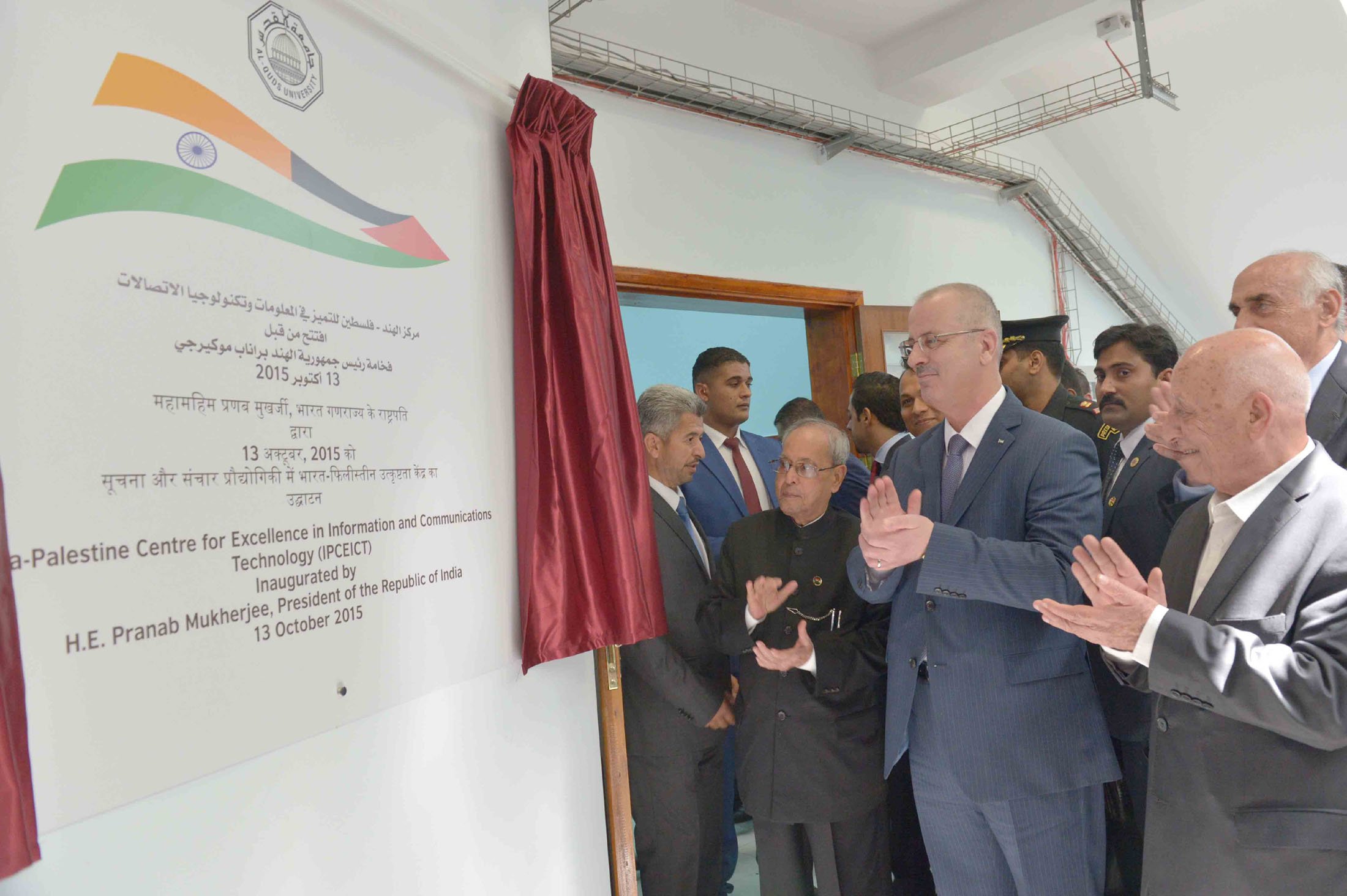
Indian president Pranab Mukherjee at the university campus, 2015

Over the past years, Al Quds University has experienced mounting pressure from the Israeli government, both politically and militarily. The Israeli West Bank barrier built in 2004 have impeded university operations. Students have been injured and many of the students studying at the university have faced tear gas and some students have been shot.

In 2013 alone, the Israeli army launched 26 separate attacks on the university campus in Abu Dis, resulting in 1,769 injuries to students and staff. In the early weeks of 2014, the Israeli army conducted three additional attacks on the Abu Dis campus. Staff and students frequently face summonses, arrests, and intimidation, both at the Abu Dis campus and the premises in the Old City, which have been raided and occasionally closed on multiple occasions.

Simultaneously, the university has been engaged in legal and political battles to secure its existence. Since 17 years, it has faced the threat of closure by the Israeli authorities. Despite being fully accredited and licensed by relevant Palestinian bodies, and internationally recognized, the Israeli authorities in occupied East Jerusalem, insist that the university obtain Israeli accreditation or face closure and arrests of its administration. However, Israel has also prevented the university from functioning as a unified entity, forcing it to split into two separate institutions. Al Quds University's attempts to meet Israeli requirements have been unsuccessful thus far. In 2023, Israeli Finance Minister Betzalel Smotrich, planned to freeze funds for the university, which was heavily criticized by Hebrew University director, Mona Kassabri, calling it "discrimination".

== Campuses ==
=== Abu Dis ===
Al–Quds University's main campus is located in town of Abu Dis, which borders Jerusalem and have close proximity to the Temple Mount. The university campus is spread across an area of 47 acres (190,000 m^{2}). On several occasion, exhibitions are organized by the university at its campus premises. There is a large botanic garden known as "Andalusian Garden", in backyard of the campus. There are three museums in the campus. These are Abu Jihad Center, Meet Math Museum and Science Museum. Abu Jihad Center and Museum was originally established in Ramallah in 1997. The facility was opened in the university campus in 2007. It consists of three floors, displaying artworks. The Said Khoury IT Center was inaugurated in 2004, by Palestinian entrepreneur Said Khoury.

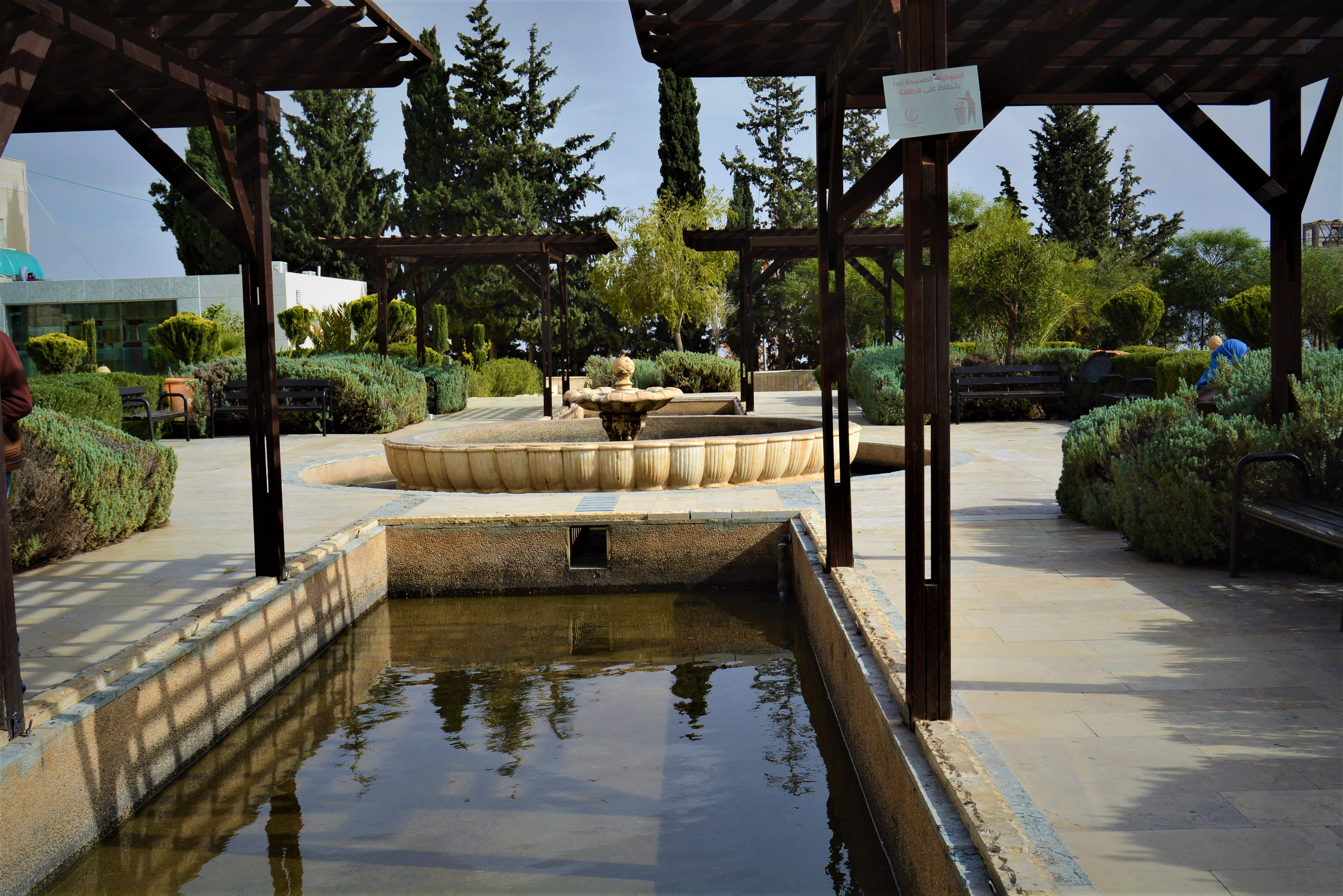
A man–made pond in campus

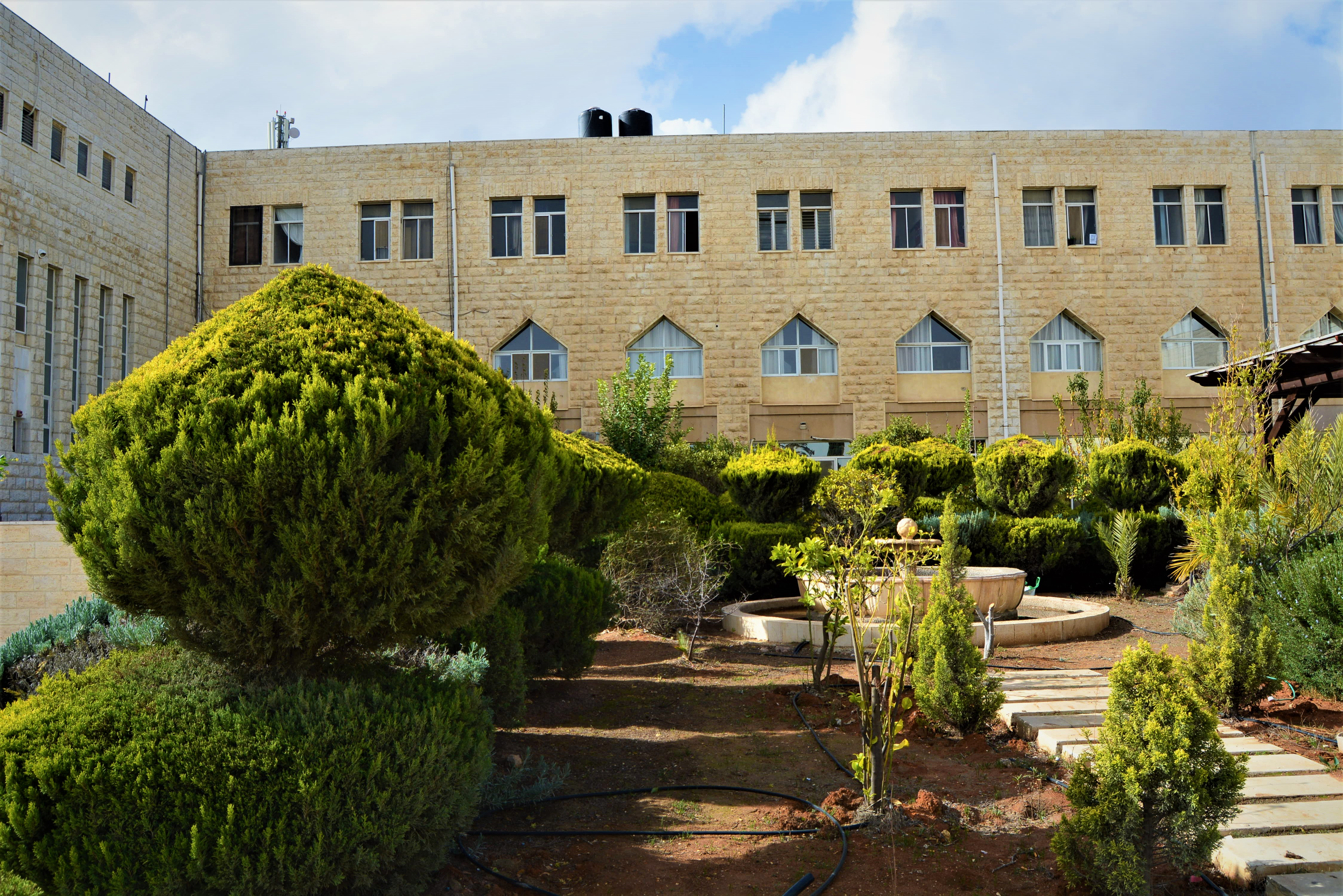
Main building of the campus

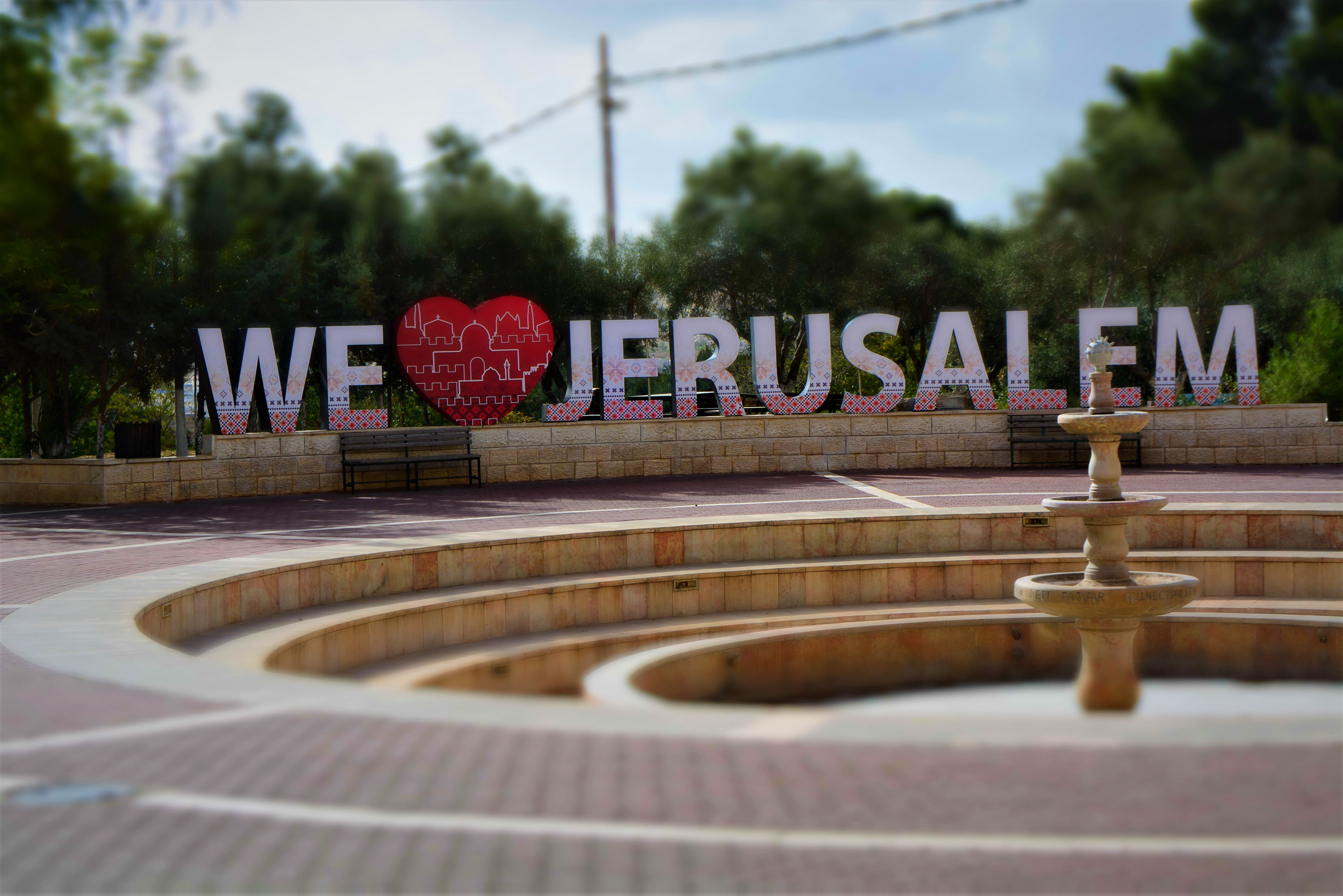
"We Love Jerusalem" at Abu Dis campus of the university

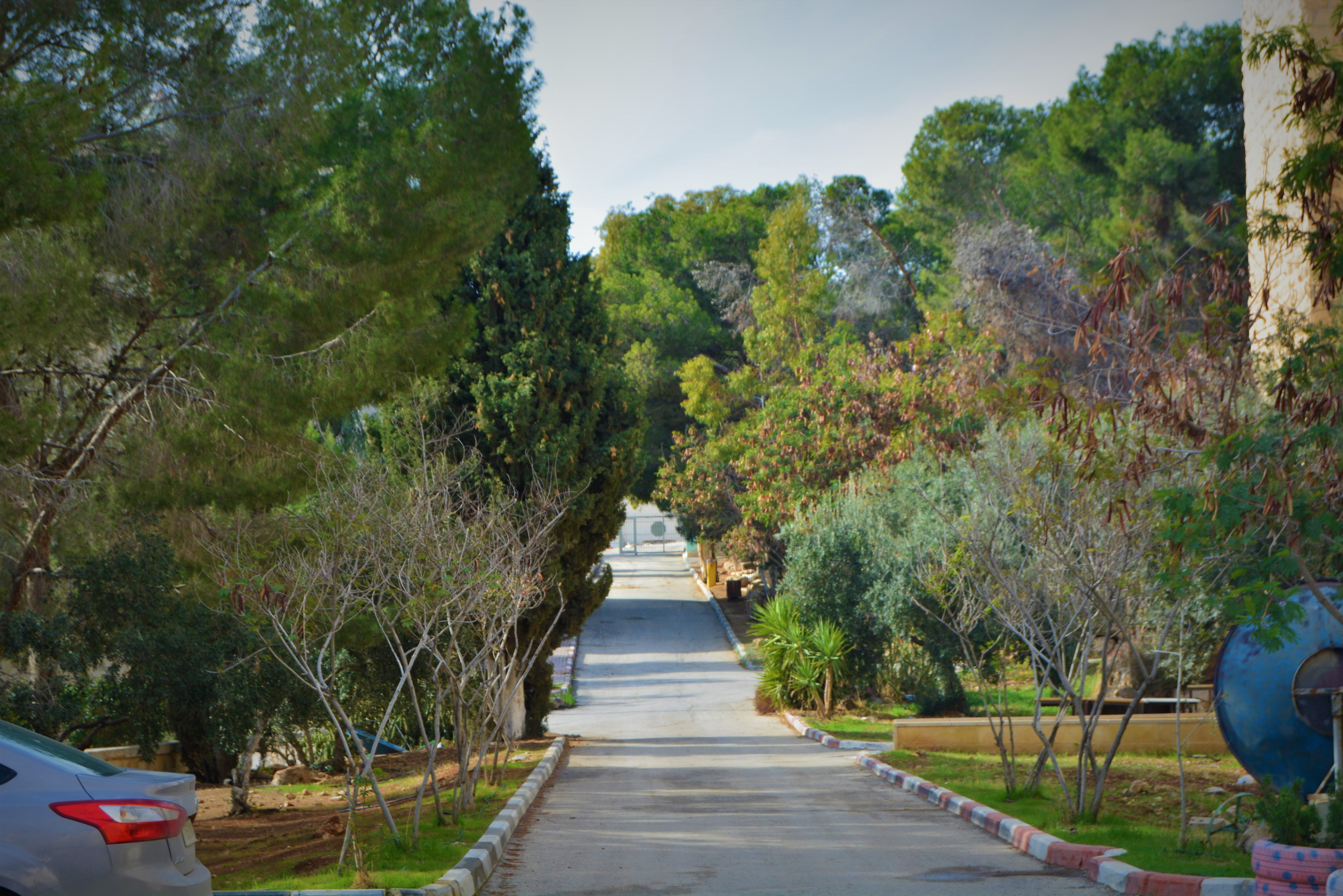
A road towards Al–Quds University, picture taken in 2018

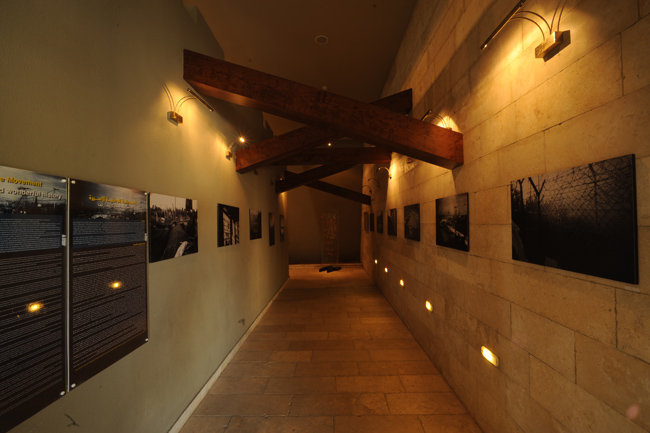
Abu Jihad Museum

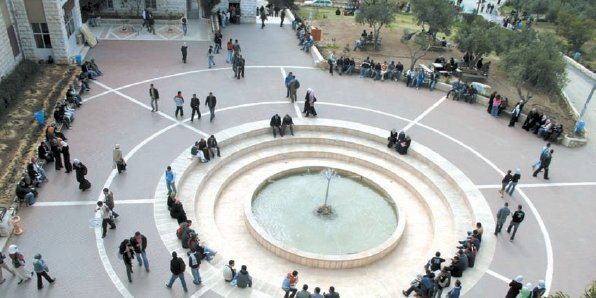
Faculty of Science & Technology

=== Old City ===
The Old City campus located in the Old City of Jerusalem, consists of three floors. It is designed in an Islamic architecture. Nearby notable landmarks are the Mosque of Omar, the Al-Aqsa Mosque, Building Complex (Dar al-Immara) and the Temple Mount (Haram Al Sharif). In 2015, Al Quds University inaugurated the first Palestinian public university in the Old City of Jerusalem, with funding from the Royal Charity Organization of Bahrain. The library consists of a collection of books of information and computer technology.

=== Sheikh Jarrah ===
There is a small girls' campus in Sheikh Jarrah neighborhood of Jerusalem, which is known as the Hind Al–Husseini College for Women. It was founded by Hind al-Husseini, a Palestinian activist, who rescued orphaned survivors of Deir Yassin massacre, by Zionist militants. Known as one of the oldest faculty, the Sheikh Jarrah campus provides programs in arts and culture. It was a mansion of her grandfather Salim al-Husayni, which was later converted into an orphanage, named as "Children's Home in Jerusalem". Dar al-Tifl al-Arabi was established as a school, which in 1972, became a college.

=== Beit Hanina ===
The Faculty of Business & Economics is located in another campus, known as "Beit Hanina Campus". It is located on the Abdel Hamaid Shoman Street in Jerusalem neighborhood of Beit Hanina. Beit Hanina campus also serves as an administrative office of the university. Al Quds Bard College, which was opened in association with the Bard College is the campus of Beit Hanina.

Bayt Mal Al Quds Al–Sharif Agency, a Moroccan organization have planned to construct a new campus of the university in neighborhood of Beit Hanina. The budget is estimated to US$500,000. The upcoming campus also includes stadium, green areas equipped with irrigation systems, rainwater recycling station and experimental farm. It will also include fully–equipped ecological museum and installation of solar panels.

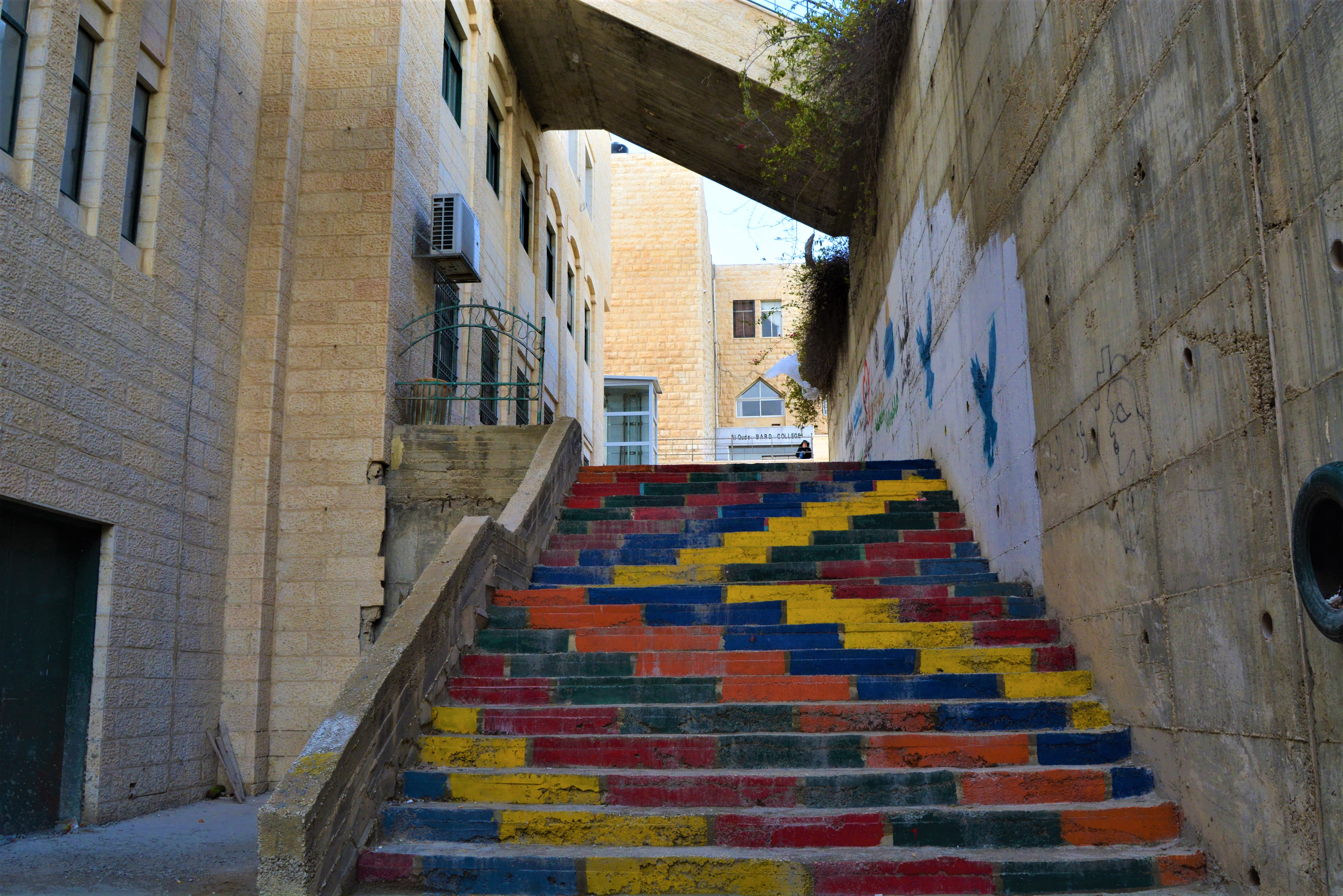
A staircase in the campus

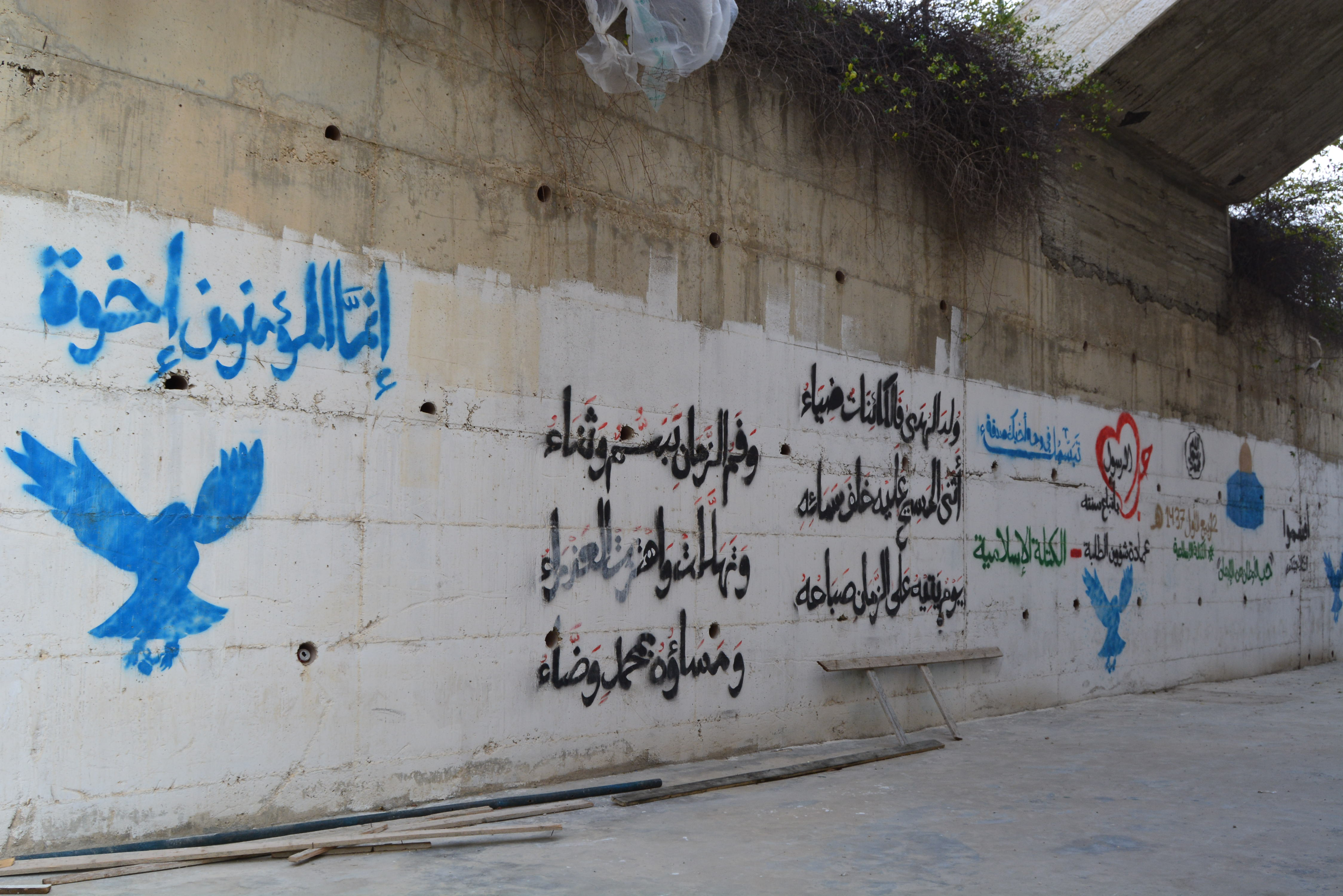
Arabic paintings on the walls of the Beit Hanina campus

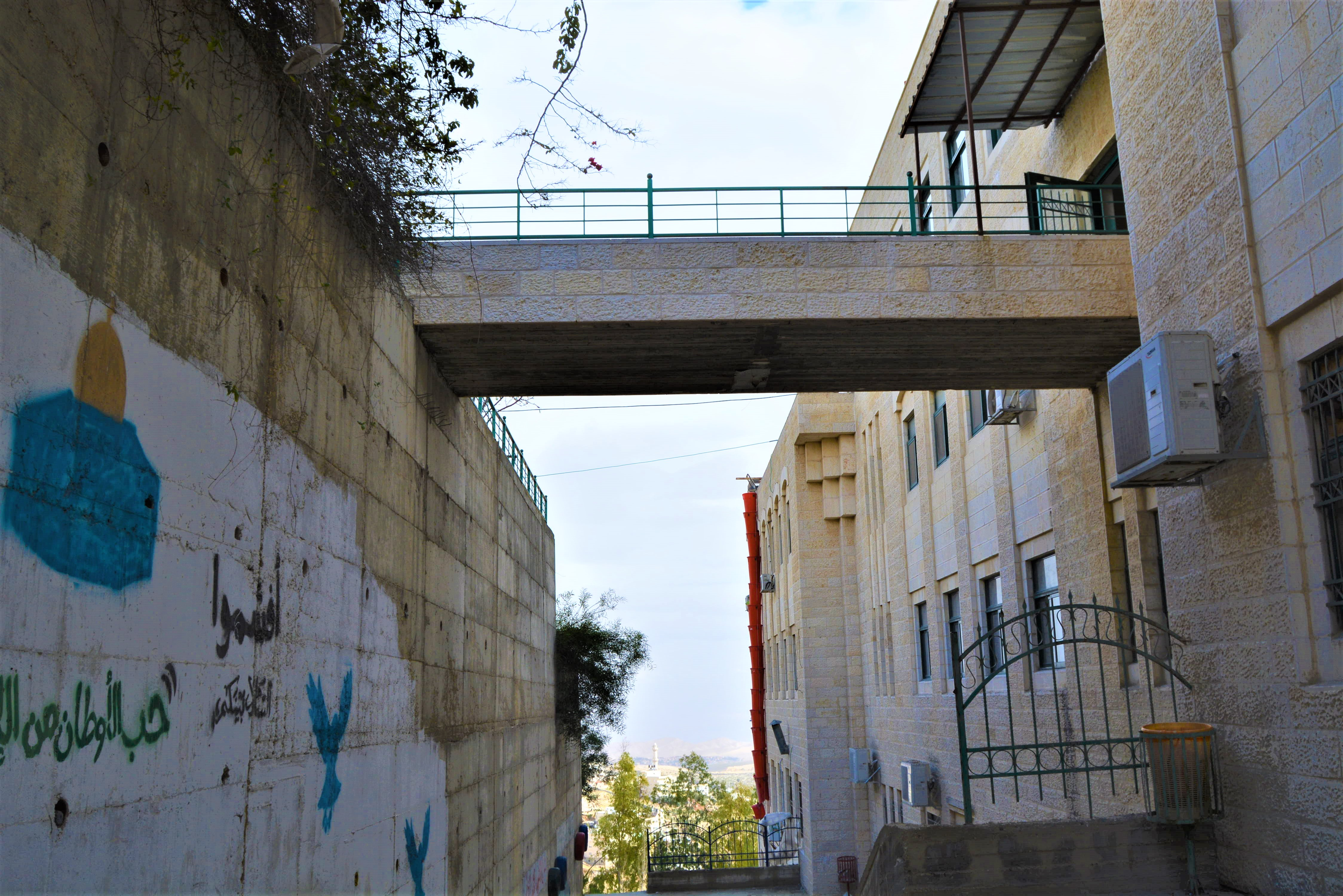
A pathway crossbridge on the campus

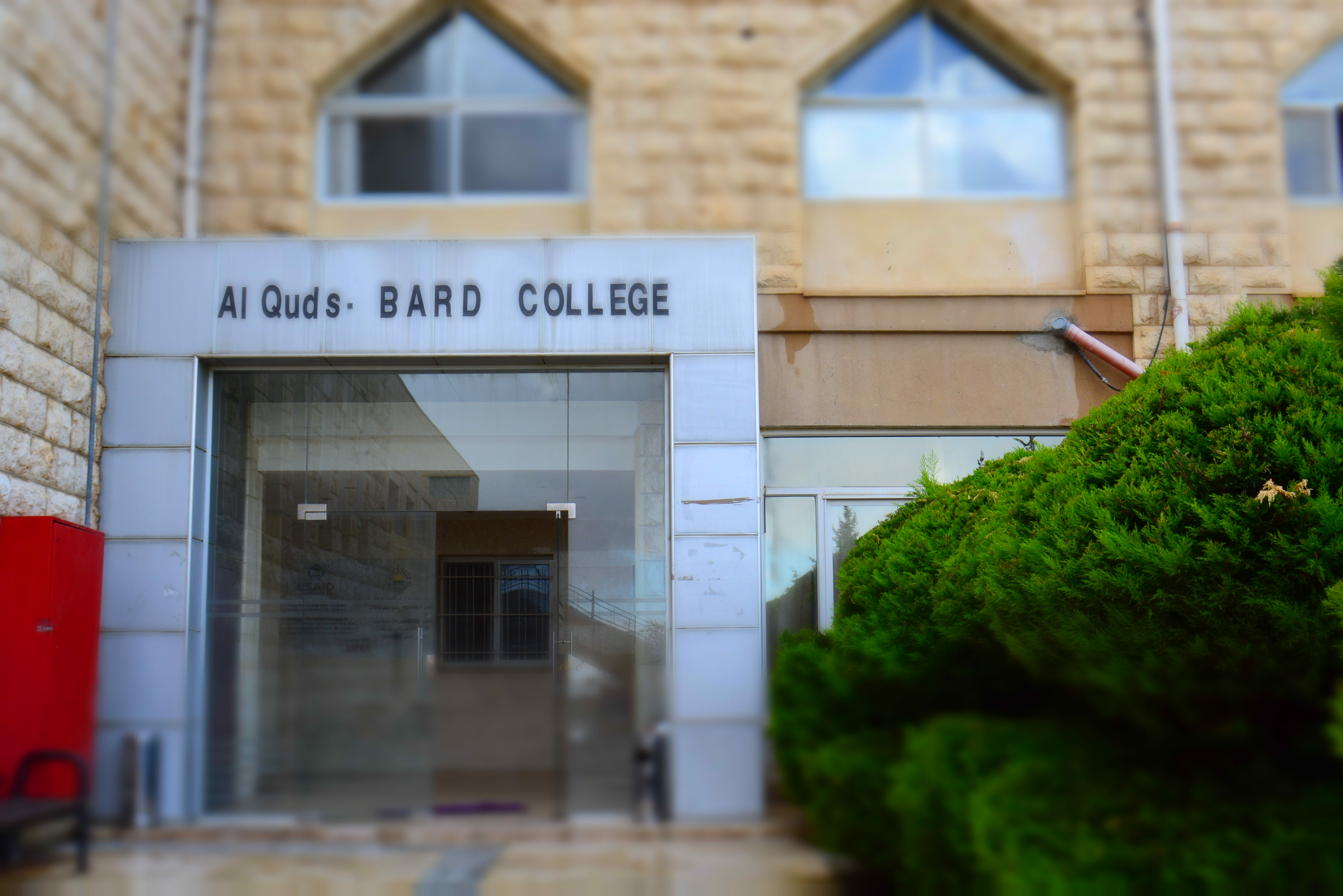
Al Quds Bard College campus in Beit Hanina

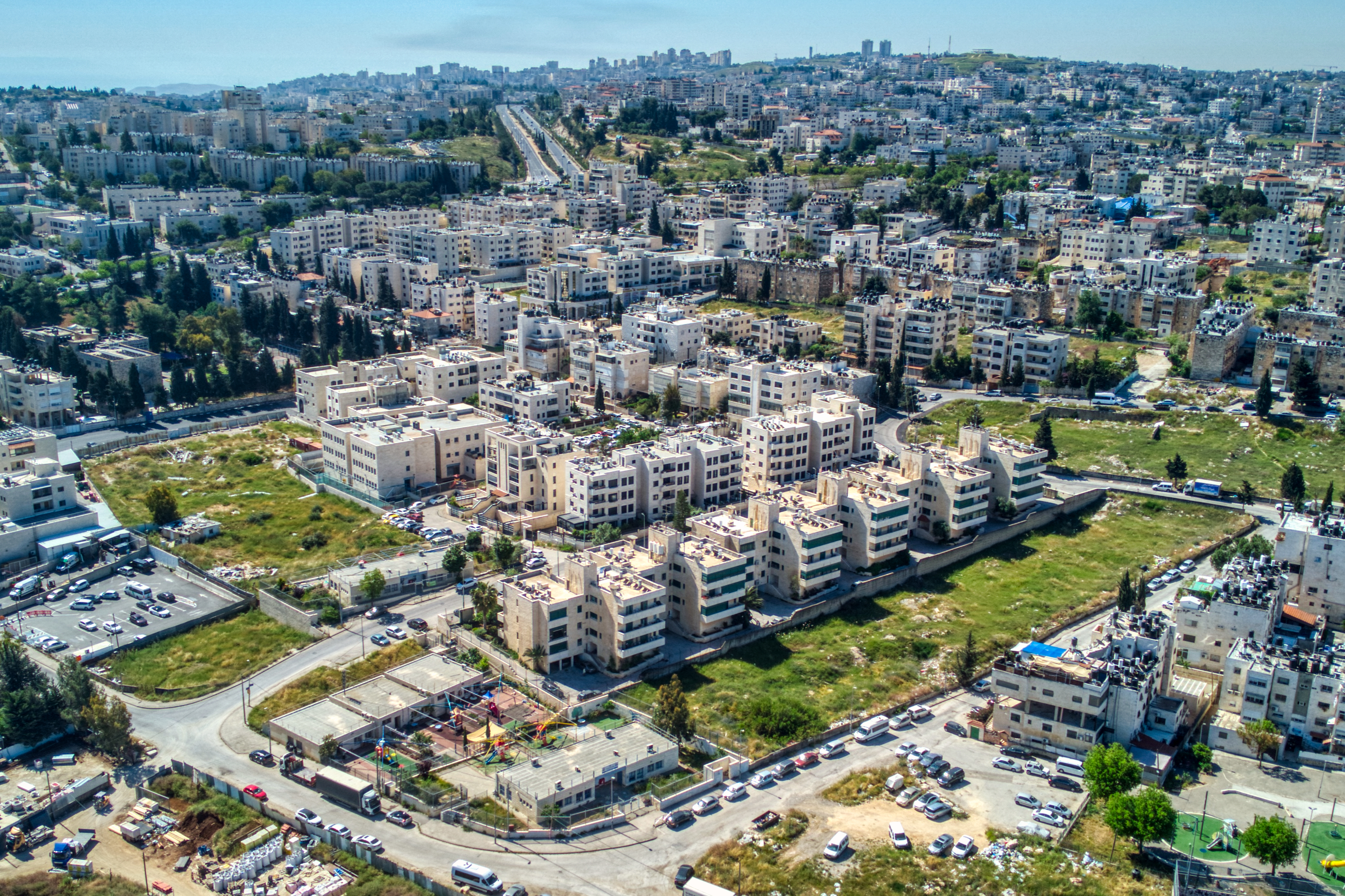
A residential area near the Beit Hanina campus

== Academics ==
=== Partnerships ===
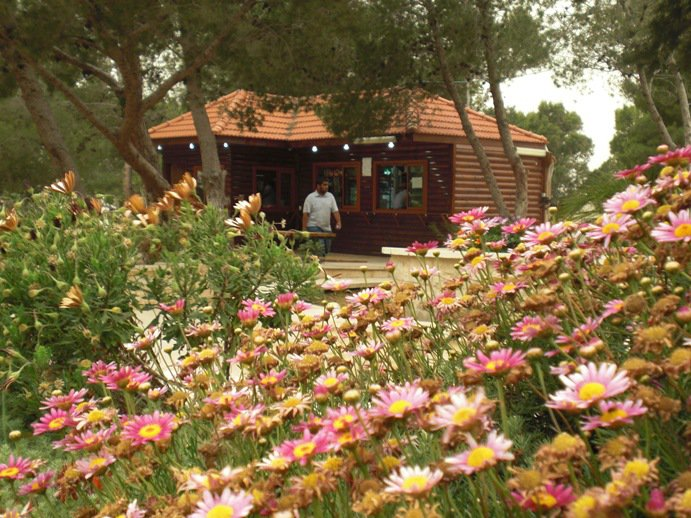
Faculty of Science & Technology and SKITCE

Brandeis University and Al-Quds had a partnership from 1998 to 2013. The partnership ended in 2013 following a demonstration at Al-Quds in which students in military gear performed a Nazi salute and Brandeis deemed the response from the Al-Quds University administration to be "unacceptable and inflammatory". Syracuse University also terminated its partnership in 2013 following the demonstration.

Bard College has dual degree program with Al-Quds University which leads to a bachelor of arts from both institutions. It also grants master's degrees in teaching, European studies, and American studies. The partnership, which was first announced in February 2009, is the first dual degree program between a Palestinian university and an American institution of higher education. The college entered into a collaboration with Al-Quds University, which included founding an honors college, a masters program in teaching and a model high school.

=== Faculty ===
Al-Quds University's faculties:

- Faculty of Medicine
- Faculty of Dentistry
- Faculty of Pharmacy
- Faculty of Law
- Faculty of Medical Professionals
- Faculty of Arts and Humanities
- Faculty of Business and Economics
- Faculty of Science and Technology
- Faculty of Quran and Islamic Studies
- Faculty of Education
- Faculty of Public Health
- Faculty of Dual Studies

==== Academy for Global Justice ====
In 2018, Al-Quds University launched the Al-Quds Academy for Global Justice, an institute that will focus on teaching, training, and research in the areas of international criminal law and human rights. Palestinian Justice Minister Ali Abu Diak also delivered a speech at the event.

== Notable alumni ==
- Saeed Abu Ali
- Wafa al Bass
- Mohammad Barghouti
- Fadwa Barghouti
- Wael Al-Dahdouh
- Hassan Yousef
- Mohiyedine Sharif
- Ahmad Rabaie
- Abbas Zakour
- Samah Jabr
- Kholoud Faqih
- Ameen Nayfeh
- Lama Khater

== See also ==
- Al-Quds University Teaching Hospital
- List of Islamic educational institutions
- List of universities and colleges in Palestine
- Education in Palestine
- Category:Al-Quds University alumni
