= Al-Buweib, Hebron =

Al-Buweib, Hebron Arabic (البويب (الخليل
- Al-Buweib, Hebron
- Location of Al-Buweib, Hebron within Palestine
- Coordinates: 31°27′55″N 35°09′18″E
- Country: Palestine
- Governorate: Hebron Governorate

Population (2017)
  - Total: 728

Al-Buweib is a village in the Palestinian Hebron Governorate, located east of Yatta and south of Hebron in the southern West Bank.

== Population ==
According to the Palestinian Central Bureau of Statistics, the population of Al-Buweib was approximately 728 in 2017.

== See also ==
- Hebron Governorate
