= Ministry of Local Government (Palestine) =

Government ministry of Palestine

- وزارة الحكم المحلي

Agency overview
- Formed: 1994
- Jurisdiction: Government of Palestine
- Headquarters: Ramallah, Palestine
- Minister responsible: Sami Hijjawi, Minister of Local Government
- Website: www.molg.ps

The Ministry of Local Government (MoLG; Arabic: وزارة الحكم المحلي) is a governmental body in Palestine that is responsible for overseeing the local government system and ensuring that it functions effectively. The ministry is responsible for providing support and guidance to local government institutions, including municipalities, village councils, and other local authorities.

The current Minister of Local Government of Palestine is Sami Hijjawi.

== History ==
The Ministry of Local Government was founded in 1994, coinciding with the formation of the Palestinian National Authority. Upon its inception, 483 local government units were established, including 103 municipalities, village councils, and small clusters. Additionally, 16 governorates were set up as a deconcentrated level of government.

The ministry has a specific structure in place to effectively carry out its mandated responsibilities, which include planning, guiding, and supervising the local government sector. It has oversight over 121 Palestinian municipalities, distributed as 96 in the West Bank and 25 in Gaza. Notably, this excludes those in Israeli-annexed East Jerusalem and UNRWA-administered refugee camps, which are managed by service committees. Additionally, there are approximately 355 village councils, along with local councils in Jerusalem.

== List of ministers ==
#	Name	Party	Government	Term start	Term end	Notes
1	Saeb Erekat	Fatah	1, 2, 3, 4, 5	5 July 1994	30 April 2003	
2	Jamal Al Shobaki	Fatah	6, 7, 8	30 April 2003	24 February 2005	
3	Khalid al-Qawasimi	Fatah	9	24 February 2005	29 March 2006	
4	Issa al-Jabari	Hamas	10	29 March 2006	17 March 2007	
5	Mohammad Barghouti	Hamas	11	17 March 2007	14 June 2007	
6	Ziad al-Bandak	Independent	12	14 June 2007	19 May 2009	
(3)	Khalid al-Qawasimi	Fatah	13, 14	19 May 2009	6 June 2013	
7	Sa'ed al-Kuni	Independent	15, 16	6 June 2013	2 June 2014	
8	Nayef Abu Khalaf	Independent	17	2 June 2014	31 July 2015	
9	Hussein al-Araj	Independent	17	31 July 2015	13 April 2019	
10	Majdi al-Saleh	Independent	18	13 April 2019	31 March 2024	
11	Sami Hijjawi	Independent	19	31 March 2024	Incumbent	
