= Palestinian Economic Council for Development and Reconstruction =

Palestinian Economic Council for Development and Reconstruction (PECDAR)
Agency overview
- Jurisdiction: Palestine Liberation Organization
- Agency executive: Muhammad Abu Awad, President
- Website: www.pecdar.ps

The Palestinian Economic Council for Development and Reconstruction (PECDAR) (Arabic: المجلس الاقتصادي الفلسطيني للتنمية والإعمار) is an independent institution established by the Palestine Liberation Organization in 1993. Its main responsibilities are coordination with donor communities in projects building the Palestinian National Authority's infrastructure, as well as economic policy advocacy. It is headed by Muhammad Abu Awad and is accountable to a Board of Trustees headed by Mahmoud Abbas.
