= Khalet al-Maiyya =

Village in West Bank, Palestine

Khalet al-Maiyya خلة المية
- Municipality type D (Village council)

Arabic transcription(s)
  - Arabic: خلة المية
- Location of Khalet al-Maiyya and in arabic= خلة المية within Palestine
- Coordinates: 31°26′45″N 35°08′36″E
- State: State of Palestine
- Governorate: Hebron

Government
  - Type: Village council

Population (2017)
  - Total: 2,149

Khalet al-Maiyya (Arabic: خلة المية), is a Palestinian village located nine kilometers south of Hebron and four kilometers west of Yatta. The village is in the Hebron Governorate Southern West Bank. According to the Palestinian Central Bureau of Statistics, the village had a population of 2,149 in 2017. The primary health care facilities for the village is designated by the Ministry of Health as level 2.
