= Palestinian Central Bureau of Statistics =

Palestine's principal government institution in charge of statistics and census data

State of Palestine Palestinian Central Bureau of Statistics (PCBS)
- الجهاز المركزي للإحصاء الفلسطيني

Agency overview
- Formed: 1993; 33 years ago
- Headquarters: Ramallah, Palestine
- Agency executives: Sufian Abu Harb, President
- Website: pcbs.gov.ps

The Palestinian Central Bureau of Statistics (PCBS; Arabic: الجهاز المركزي للإحصاء الفلسطيني, romanized: al-Jihāz al-Markazī lil-Iḥṣāʼ al-Filasṭīnī) is the official statistical institution of Palestine. Its main task is to provide credible statistics at the national and international levels. It is a state institution that provides service to the governmental, non-governmental and private sectors, in addition to research institutions and universities. It was established as an independent statistical bureau in 1993. The PCBS publishes the Statistical Yearbook of Palestine and the Jerusalem Statistical Yearbook annually.

The head office of the agency is in Ein Munjed Quarter, Ramallah.

== Activities ==
Besides general statistics, such as the Retail Price Index, the PCBS also carries out special projects. It conducted the first Palestinian census in 1997, although Israel prevented the national census team from surveying the population in East Jerusalem. In 2007, the second census was carried out. In the 2007 census, a limited census was carried out in East Jerusalem. The latest census was conducted in 2017.

Also, the PCBS provided the 2003 "Survey on the Impact of separation Wall on the Location Where it Passed Through".

The PCBS publishes the Statistical Yearbook of Palestine and the Jerusalem Statistical Yearbook annually.

== Offices ==
The PCBS has its main office in the Balu'a area of Ramallah. In October 2001, the building was raided by the Israeli Defence Forces. The soldiers confiscated hard drives and vandalized a number of the offices. In March and April 2002, its Fieldwork section in downtown Ramallah was raided four times; soldiers searched the apartments.

== Presidents ==
- Hasan Abu-Libdeh (1993–2005)
- Luay Shabeneh (2005–2010)
- Ola Awad (2011–2025)
- Sufian Abu Harb (2026–present)

== See also ==
- List of regions of Israel and Palestine by life expectancy
