= Al-Aqsa clashes =

List of clashes that have occurred in the Al-Aqsa mosque

Coordinates: 31°46′34.45″N 35°14′8.08″E

Al-Aqsa has been the site of frequent clashes between Palestinian Arab visitors and both Israeli security forces and Israeli groups, beginning with the 1990 Temple Mount killings, or Al-Aqsa Massacre, and most recently culminating in the 2023 Al-Aqsa clashes.

== 1990 Temple Mount killings ==
The 1990 Temple Mount killings, or Al Aqsa Massacre, took place in the Al-Aqsa compound on the Temple Mount, Jerusalem at 10:30 am on Monday, 8 October 1990 before Zuhr prayer during the third year of the First Intifada. Following a decision by the Temple Mount Faithful to lay the cornerstone for the Temple, mass riots erupted, In the ensuing clashes, 17 Palestinians died, (Note: "All accounts originally reported anywhere between 19 and 21 deaths. At a 15 October press conference, however, the Jerusalem-based Palestine Human Rights Information Center (PHRIC) lowered the death count to 17, and other organizations and reports followed. Of the deaths initially reported, one had died of a heart attack, two thought to have died were only injured and survived, and one had been shot by an Israeli civilian in another section of Jerusalem (and later died)") more than 150 Palestinians were wounded by Israeli security forces, and more than 20 Israeli civilians and police were wounded by Palestinians. United Nations Security Council Resolution 672, which was rejected by Israel, "condemned especially the acts of violence committed by the Israeli security forces" and United Nations Security Council Resolution 673 urged that Israel reconsider its refusal to allow United Nations Secretary-General Javier Pérez de Cuéllar to carry out an investigation.

== 2009 Al-Aqsa clashes ==
The 2009 Al-Aqsa clashes started followed rising tensions beginning on 2 August with the forcible evictions of nine Palestinian families in Sheikh Jarrah. During Ramadan, the Palestinian access to Al Aqsa Mosque was increasingly restricted. During the last week of Ramadan ending on 19 September, Palestinians from the rest of the West Bank were barred from entry into East Jerusalem for the Jewish New Year.

== 2017 Temple Mount crisis ==
The 2017 Temple Mount crisis was a period of violent tensions related to the Temple Mount, which began on 14 July 2017, after a shooting incident in the complex in which Palestinian gunmen killed two Israeli police officers. Following the attack, Israeli authorities installed metal detectors at the entrance to the Mount in a step that caused large Palestinian protests and was severely criticized by Palestinian leaders, the Arab League, and other Muslim leaders, on the basis that it constituted a change in the "status quo" of the Temple Mount entry restrictions.

The Jerusalem Islamic Waqf called on Muslims to pray outside the Temple Mount, and not enter the mosque complex until the metal detectors were removed.

On 25 July the Israeli Cabinet voted to remove the metal detectors and replace them with other surveillance measures. Nevertheless, Palestinian activists decided to continue protesting, claiming those cameras represent a greater degree of control than the metal detectors. On 27 July, Israel removed the new security measures from the Mount, which led to the Waqf telling Muslims they could return to pray inside the compound. 113 Palestinians were reportedly injured in clashes with police after thousands of Muslims returned to pray at Temple Mount.

Within an 11-day period, eleven people had died due to the crisis.

== 2021 Israel–Palestine crisis ==
In April 2021, during both Passover and Ramadan, the site was a focus of tension between Israeli settlers and Palestinians. Jewish settlers broke an agreement between Israel and Jordan and performed prayers and read from the Torah inside the compound, an area normally off limits to non-Muslims. On 14 April, Israeli police entered the area and forcibly cut wires to speakers in minarets around the mosque, silencing the call to prayer, claiming the sound was interfering with an event by the Israeli president at the Western Wall. On 16 April, seventy thousand Muslims prayed in the compound around the mosque, the largest gathering since the beginning of the COVID pandemic; police barred most from entering the structure itself. In May 2021, hundreds of Palestinians were injured following clashes in the compound after reports of Israel's intention to proceed to evict Palestinians from land claimed by Israeli settlers.

== 2022 Al-Aqsa Mosque storming ==
The 2022 Al-Aqsa Mosque storming occurred on 15 April 2022, when Israeli forces entered the Temple Mount and used tear gas shells and sound bombs to disperse Palestinians who, they said, were throwing stones at policemen. Some Palestinians barricaded themselves inside the Al-Aqsa mosque, where they were detained by Israeli police. Over 150 people ended up injured and 400 arrested.

== 2023 Al-Aqsa clashes ==
The 2023 Al-Aqsa clashes were a series of violent confrontations that occurred between Palestinians and Israeli police at the Al-Aqsa Mosque compound in Jerusalem in April 2023. After the evening Ramadan prayer, Palestinians barricaded themselves inside the mosque, prompted by reports that Jews planned to sacrifice a goat at the site (which is forbidden by Israeli law). In response, Israeli police raided the mosque in riot gear, injuring 50 people.
