= 1990 in Palestine =

- Decades: 1970s; 1980s; 1990s; 2000s; 2010s
- See also: History of Palestine; Timeline of Palestinian history; List of years in Palestine

Events in the year 1990 in Palestine.

== Incumbents ==
- President of Palestine – Yasser Arafat

== Events ==
- 23 February – US secretary of state James Baker tells Israeli foreign minister Moshe Arens the time is ripe for Israel to accept his compromise formula for an Israeli-Palestinian dialogue.
- 28 February – US secretary of state James Baker asks for assurances that the housing guarantees requested by Israel for the resettlement of Soviet Jews will not be used to support settlements in the occupied Palestinian territories.
- 3 March – US president George H. W. Bush declares that the United States does "not believe there should be new settlements in the West Bank or in East Jerusalem."
- 16 March – Israeli army kill three alleged Democratic Front for the Liberation of Palestine (DFLP) members in the South Lebanon security zone.
- 29 March – The senior Israeli officer, Colonel Yehuda Meir, who was accused of ordering soldiers to "systematically break the bones" of nearly two dozen bound Palestinian demonstrators, denied the eight charges filed against him in the court martial proceedings, which included abuse, intentionally causing serious damage and behavior unacceptable for an officer.
- 7 April – Hamas declines the invitation to participate in the Preparatory Committee for Restructuring the PNC.
- 14 May – Rabbi Moshe Levinger, who shot and killed the Palestinian store owner Khayed Salah and injured the customer Ibrahim Bali when he was attacked by stone throwers in the center of the city Hebron on 30 September 1988, was convicted after signing a plea bargain. Levinger was sentenced to five months in prison.
- 20 May – Ami Popper, a former dishonorably-discharged Israeli soldier, kills seven Palestinian workers from the Gaza Strip in the Israeli town of Rishon Lezion. Popper committed the murder with a rifle that he stole from his soldier brother.
- 30 May – Palestinian Liberation Front (PLF) militants attempt an attack on Nitzanim beach, near Tel Aviv with speedboats. Israeli ships and aircraft intercepted the militants, killing four militants and capturing 12.
- 11 June – The Palestine Liberation Organization (PLO) issues a statement opposing any military action targeting civilians in response to the 30 May 1990 PLF attempted attack.
- 20 June – US president George H. W. Bush announces the suspension of the US-PLO dialogue due to the 30 May 1990 attempted attack which PLF militants had tried to attack civilians near Tel Aviv.
- 17 July – Palestinian president Yasser Arafat marries Suha Arafat in a secret ceremony on her 27th birthday when he was 61 years old. Her mother, Raymonda Tawil, introduced her to him in France, after which she worked as his secretary in Tunis. Their marriage was not announced until 1992. Suha Arafat becomes First Lady of Palestine.
- 21 September – The Lebanese Parliament amends the Lebanese Constitution to reject resettlement. The rejection of resettlement, which is reference to Palestinian refugees in Lebanon, is in accordance with Palestinian political forces who call for the right of the refugees to return to their homes.
- 8 October – First Intifada: 1990 Temple Mount killings: Following a decision by the extremist Jewish group Temple Mount Faithful (TMF) to lay the cornerstone for the Temple, mass riots erupted and in the ensuing clashes, 17 Palestinians died, more than 150 Palestinians were wounded by Israeli security forces, and more than 20 Israeli civilians and police were wounded by Palestinians.
- 12 October – In the aftermath of the 1990 Temple Mount killings, the United Nations Security Council passes United Nations Security Council Resolution 672, in which it unanimously "condemns especially the acts of violence committed by the Israeli security forces resulting in injuries and loss of human life," welcomes the Secretary-General's decision to send a mission to the region, and requests that "he submit a report to it before the end of October 1990."
- 24 October – The United Nations Security Council unanimously deplores, in its United Nations Security Council Resolution 673, the refusal of the Israeli government to receive the mission of the Secretary-General to the region and "urges the Israeli Government to reconsider its decision and insists that it comply fully with resolution 672 (1990)."
- 20 December – The United Nations Security Council adopts United Nations Security Council Resolution 681 which states that it's "gravely concerned at the dangerous deterioration of the situation in all the Palestinian territories occupied by Israel since 1967, including Jerusalem," referring the West Bank and the Gaza Strip as being Palestinian and includes Jerusalem as part of it. The resolution urges Israel "to accept de jure applicability of the Fourth Geneva Convention of 1949, to all the territories occupied by Israel since 1967" and "calls upon the high contracting parties to the Fourth Geneva Convention of 1949 to ensure respect by Israel" of its obligations under the convention. The resolution is adopted unanimously.

== See also ==
- 1990 in Israel
