= 1986 in Palestine =

- Decades: 1960s; 1970s; 1980s; 1990s; 2000s
- See also: History of Palestine; Timeline of Palestinian history; List of years in Palestine

Events in the year 1986 in Palestine.

== Incumbents ==
- Chairman of the Palestine Liberation Organization – Yasser Arafat

== Events ==
=== January ===
- 8 January: Minor rioting breaks out in East Jerusalem due to a visit to the Temple Mount by members of the Knesset's Interior Committee to investigate complaints of illegal construction.
- 13 January: 17 Palestinians are arrested in the West Bank in connection to the 1985 West Bank land fraud case.

=== February ===
- 19 February: King Hussein of Jordan declares the failure of the Palestinian-Jordanian Joint Action Agreement signed in 1985. In his declaration, Hussein accuses the PLO of breaking their promise to recognise United Nations Security Council Resolution 242 and United Nations Security Council Resolution 338.

=== March ===
- 2 March: Mayor of Nablus Zafer al-Masri is assassinated by Palestinian extremists.
- 14 March: The body of Sergeant David Manos, an Israeli soldier who disappeared in Israel in late 1984, is discovered in the West Bank. Four Palestinians from Deir Ballut would later be charged with his kidnapping and murder.
- 30 March: Land Day demonstrations are held across the occupied Palestinian territories.

=== April ===
- Former Mayor of Gaza City Rashad al-Shawwa meets with Egyptian President Hosni Mubarak to propose a new peace initiative using a Gaza First approach which would see the Gaza Strip be granted autonomy under Egyptian rule.

=== May ===
- 23 May: Meron Benvenisti's West Bank Data Base Project publishes a report warning that conditions in the Gaza Strip were significantly deteriorating.

=== June ===
- 5 June: The nineteenth anniversary of the Six-Day War is marked. The anniversary would see a spate of attacks by Palestinian terrorists on Israeli civilians.

=== July ===
- 24 July: The Popular Front for the Liberation of Palestine carries out a terrorist attack against Israeli tourists visiting the West Bank town of Jericho, injuring thirteen.
- 25 July: American Vice-President George H. W. Bush arrives in Israeli for an official visit, during which he would meet with a group of Palestinian moderates. Following the visit, Bush would announce additional aid for Palestinian development, to be used under a Jordanian-led programme, a move that the PLO denounces.

=== September ===
- 9 September: Palestinian newspaper Al Fajr publishes the results of an opinion poll overseen by An-Najah University, Meron Benvenisti, the Australian Broadcasting Corporation, and Newsday. The poll finds that 78% would prefer the establishment of a "democratic Palestinian state in all of Palestine" as the solution to the Israeli-Palestinian conflict compared to 17% supporting a two-state solution, with 88% saying that the 1978 Coastal road massacre was justified. The An-Najah University professor who led the poll would subsequently have his visa revoked for engaging in non-academic activity.
- 16 September: The Cairo Amman Bank announces its intention to open a branch in Nablus, the first Arab bank to resume operations in the West Bank since the 1967 Six-Day War.
- 27 September: First of the 1986 Ashkelon stabbings. Over the next month and a half, a group of Palestinian terrorists would carry three separate stabbing attacks against Israeli civilians from Ashkelon while they were visiting the Gaza Strip to shop.
- 28 September: The Israeli government appoints Abdel Majid E-Zir as Mayor of Hebron, Halil Mussa Halil as Mayor of Ramallah, and Hassan A-Tawil as Mayor of Al-Bireh.

=== October ===
- 15 October: A Palestinian terrorist attack in Jerusalem kills one Israeli, Dov Porat, and injures sixty-nine.
- 22 October: The Israeli Hadassah Medical Organization establishes a liaison office with the Israeli Civil Administration to improve healthcare in the occupied Palestinian territories. The same day, the Israeli government appoints Tahir Hijazi as Mayor of Anabta.

=== November ===
- 2 November: Balfour Day is marked by demonstrations across the occupied territories.
- 3 November: Controversy is sparked after the Israeli government orders Palestinian Akram Haniyah deported for "hostile activity" and Fatah militancy.
- 15 November: Killing of Eliahu Amedi. Three Popular Front for the Liberation of Palestine members murder Israeli yeshiva student Eliahu Amedi in Jerusalem.

=== December ===
- 4 December: December 1986 Birzeit University protests. A significant wave of rioting and violence breaks out across the occupied Palestinian territories following the deaths of two Birzeit University students in a riot at the university.

== Deaths ==
- 22 November - Anwar Nuseibeh

== See also ==
- 1986 in Israel
- 1986 in Jordan
