= 1985 in Palestine =

- Decades: 1960s; 1970s; 1980s; 1990s; 2000s
- See also: History of Palestine; Timeline of Palestinian history; List of years in Palestine

Events in the year 1985 in Palestine.

== Incumbents ==
- Chairman of the Palestine Liberation Organization – Yasser Arafat

== Events ==
=== January ===
- 10 January – The Israeli government announces that it has approved the establishment of six new settlements in the West Bank by the end of the year.
- 25 January – Israeli civilian David Pinhas is murdered when Palestinian terrorists throw a Molotov cocktail at the vehicule he was driving near Qalqilya, during a wave of Palestinian attacks against Israeli vehicules in the West Bank.

=== February ===
- 4 February – Israeli soldier Aharon Avidar is assassinated in Ramallah by the Popular Front for the Liberation of Palestine, the first Israeli soldier to be killed while on duty in the West Bank in over a year. In the aftermath, the Israeli government pledges to take a harsher line on Palestinian violence.
- 5 February – The Israeli military government orders the closure of 150 shops in Ramallah and El Bireh.
- 11 February – PLO chairman Yasser Arafat and King Hussein of Jordan sign the Palestinian-Jordanian Joint Action Agreement.

=== March ===
- 1 March – The Israeli raids the campuses of Birzeit University. Following the raid, the Israeli authorities order the university's new campus closed for two months, saying that the raids had found "inciting material."
- 21 March – Israeli Minister of Defence Yitzhak Rabin visits the Gaza Strip for the first time as Minister of Defence. During the visit, he tells settlers in Gush Katif that Gaza "must remain an inseparable part of the State of Israel."

=== April ===
- 19 April – Bethlehem University is ordered indefinitely closed by the Israeli authorities following an Israeli military raid of the campus.

=== May ===
- 21 May – 1150 Palestinians in Israeli custody are released for three Israeli soldiers in the Jibril Agreement.

=== July ===
- 7 July – The Israeli government orders the Austrian Pilgrim Hospice to the Holy Family in the Old City of Jerusalem permanently closed, saying that the hospital's facilities were unable to provide adequate medical care. The closure proves controversial, leading to a general strike by Palestinians in East Jerusalem.

=== August ===
- 2 August – An-Najah National University is ordered closed for two months by Israeli authorities, who claim that a stash of pro-terrorist propaganda material was found in a search of the student union's office.
- 4 August – The Israeli government announces the Iron Fist policy, reinstating a range of security measures in the occupied territories that had lapsed over the last few years, including increased use of administrative detention, deportations, demolitions, house searches, checkpoints, and mass arrests.
- 17 August – The 1985 West Bank land fraud case is revealed.
- 28 August: Israeli authorities begin the first major series of arrests of Palestinians under the Iron Fist policy. Over the next few days, dozens of Palestinians would be placed in administrative detention under suspicion of subversive activity, and roadblocks would be erected across the West Bank.

=== October ===
- 1 October – Israel carries out Operation Wooden Leg bombing the PLO headquarters in Hammam Chott, Tunisia. Killing 50 Palestinians and 18 Tunisians and wounding over 100 people.

=== November ===
- 3 November –Controversy involving Israeli settlers breaks out after the Yesha Council declares its willigness to lead a "nonviolent civil rebellion" if the Israeli government cedes control over the occupied territories and a West Bank settlers' newspaper calls for every settler to "prepare himself spiritually to stand in Judaea, Samaria and the Gaza region, and to raise his arm-and his gun-against his brother. In that hour of national emergency, most of the means will be legitimate, in the absence of a more comfortable and acceptable choice."

=== December ===
- A study by the CUNY Graduate Center that claims to be "the first non-partisan study of health conditions in the West Bank and Gaza Strip" is published, finding "third World patterns of health" in the occupied territories.
- 2 December– Aziz Shehadeh, a Palestinian moderate and long-advocate for Palestinian independence, is murdered in Ramallah by the hardline anti-PLO splinter Abu Nidal Organization.
- 17 December – An-Najah National University is ordered closed for several days by the Israeli authorities, who say that it was necessary to prevent a symposium on armed struggle from being held and to confiscate PLO propaganda material being held on campus.

== See also ==
- 1985 in Israel
- 1985 in Jordan
