= 1988 in Palestine =

- Decades: 1960s; 1970s; 1980s; 1990s; 2000s
- See also: History of Palestine; Timeline of Palestinian history; List of years in Palestine

Events in the year 1988 in Palestine.

The State of Palestine was declared during the First Intifada, which was raging since 9 December 1987 in Palestine.

== Incumbents ==
- Chairman of the Palestine Liberation Organization – Yasser Arafat

== Events ==
=== February ===
- 25 February – Two Palestinians, 17- year old Wael Joudeh and his cousin Osamah are beaten by Israeli soldiers, footage of the beating is captured on camera and aired to the world, which is considered the first recorded incident of Israel's “breaking the bones” policy.

=== June ===
- 7 - 9 June – the Arab League summit is held and the participants affirm their support for the Palestinian intifada.

=== August ===
- 18 August – Hamas issues their Charter which outlines the organization's founding identity, positions, and aims.

=== November ===
- 12 November – The first day of the 19th session of the Palestinian National Council begins in Algiers, Algeria. The First Intifada brings attention to the Israeli occupation and Palestinian rights and the PNC begins to draft a declaration of independence and a political communiqué.
- 13 November – The second day of the 19th session of the Palestinian National Council in Algiers.
- 14 November – The third day of the 19th session of the Palestinian National Council in Algiers.
- 15 November – The Palestinian Declaration of Independence is made in Algiers. The Palestinian National Council vote in favor 253–46 of the declaration and the State of Palestine comes into being. Algeria is the first country to recognize the State of Palestine. Bahrain, Indonesia, Iraq, Kuwait, Libya, Malaysia, Mauritania, Morocco, Somalia, Tunisia, Turkey, and Yemen also recognizes the State of Palestine.
- 16 November – Afghanistan, Bangladesh, Cuba, Jordan, Madagascar, Nicaragua, Pakistan, Qatar, Saudi Arabia, United Arab Emirates, Yugoslavia, and Zambia recognizes the State of Palestine. Serbia continues this recognition as the claimed successor state of Yugoslavia and adheres to all recognitions it conducted. The other post-Yugoslav states would start new policies about the recognition of the State of Palestine.
- 17 November – Albania, Brunei, Djibouti, Mauritius, and Sudan recognizes the State of Palestine.
- 18 November – Cyprus, Czechoslovakia, Egypt, Gambia, India, Nigeria, Seychelles, and Sri Lanka recognizes the State of Palestine. The Czech Republic and Slovakia continue this recognition following the 1992 dissolution of Czechoslovakia.
- 19 November – The Soviet Union grants recognition to the State of Palestine, becoming the first country from the permanent members of the United Nations Security Council to do so. Russia continues this recognition as the successor state of the Soviet Union and as a permanent member of the United Nations Security Council. Belarus continues this recognition as the successor state of the Byelorussian SSR. Ukraine continues this recognition as the successor state of the Ukrainian SSR. The other 12 post-Soviet states would start new policies about the recognition of the State of Palestine. Namibia and Vietnam also recognizes the State of Palestine.
- 20 November – China grants recognition to the State of Palestine, becoming the second country from the permanent members of the United Nations Security Council to do so.
- 21 November – Burkina Faso, Comoros, Guinea, Guinea-Bissau, Cambodia, and Mali recognizes the State of Palestine.
- 22 November – Mongolia and Senegal recognizes the State of Palestine.
- 23 November – Hungary recognizes the State of Palestine.
- 24 November – Cape Verde, North Korea, Niger, Romania, and Tanzania recognizes the State of Palestine.
- 25 November – Bulgaria recognizes the State of Palestine.
- 27 November – The United States denies PLO Chairman Yasser Arafat a visa to enter the United States to address the United Nations General Assembly in New York City, citing national security concerns.
- 28 November – Maldives recognizes the State of Palestine.
- 29 November – Ghana, Togo, and Zimbabwe recognizes the State of Palestine. 61 countries recognized the State of Palestine by the end of November which is now counted as 64 countries due to the 1991 dissolution of the Soviet Union and the 1992 dissolution of Czechoslovakia.

=== December ===
- 1 December – Chad recognizes the State of Palestine.
- 2 December – Laos recognizes the State of Palestine.
- 3 December – Sierra Leone and Uganda recognizes the State of Palestine.
- 5 December – The Republic of the Congo recognizes the State of Palestine.
- 6 December – Angola recognizes the State of Palestine.
- 7 December – Yasser Arafat recognizes the right of Israel to exist.
- 8 December – Mozambique recognizes the State of Palestine.
- 9 December –
  - The UN General Assembly approves UNGA Resolution 43/160 which granted the Palestine Liberation Organization the right to circulate communications without an intermediary.
  - Operation Blue and Brown: A failed Israeli commando raid on a Palestinian base near Na'ameh, 10 km South of Beirut, in which the commanding officer was killed.
- 10 December – São Tomé and Príncipe recognizes the State of Palestine.
- 12 December – Gabon recognizes the State of Palestine.
- 13 December –
  - Yasser Arafat addresses the United Nations General Assembly in Geneva. The UN General Assembly moved its session from New York City to Geneva to deliberate on the "Question of Palestine" after the United States refused to grant a visa to Arafat.
  - Oman recognizes the State of Palestine.
- 14 December –
  - After Yasser Arafat renounced violence, the United States said it would open dialogue with the Palestine Liberation Organization (PLO).
  - Poland recognizes the State of Palestine.
- 15 December – The UN General Assembly approves UNGA Resolution 43/177, acknowledging the Palestinian Declaration of Independence and replacing the designating "Palestine" rather than "PLO" in the United Nations system. 72 countries recognized the State of Palestine by time of the passage of UNGA Resolution 43/177 which is now counted as 75 countries due to the 1991 dissolution of the Soviet Union and the 1992 dissolution of Czechoslovakia.
- 18 December – The Democratic Republic of the Congo recognizes the State of Palestine.
- 19 December – Botswana and Nepal recognizes the State of Palestine.
- 22 December – Burundi recognizes the State of Palestine.
- 23 December – The Central African Republic recognizes the State of Palestine.
- 24 December – PLO leaders met at Yasser Arafat's home outside Baghdad, Iraq, to discuss forming a government for a Palestinian state.
- 25 December – Bhutan recognizes the State of Palestine. 78 countries recognized the State of Palestine by the end of December and the year which is now counted as 81 countries due to the 1991 dissolution of the Soviet Union and the 1992 dissolution of Czechoslovakia.

== Births ==
- 22 November – Muhammad Jamal Al-Durrah, Palestinian child killed during the second Intifada (d.2000)

== Deaths ==
- 16 April – Khalil al-Wazir, PLO leader and co-founder, was assassinated in his house in Tunis.
- 28 September – Rashad al-Shawwa, Palestinian politician who served as mayor of Gaza between 1971 and 1982.

== See also ==
- 1988 in Israel
