= 1992 in Palestine =

- Decades: 1970s; 1980s; 1990s; 2000s; 2010s
- See also: History of Palestine; Timeline of Palestinian history; List of years in Palestine

Events in the year 1992 in Palestine.

== Incumbents ==
- President of Palestine – Yasser Arafat

== Events ==
- 2 January – The Israeli government announces the deportation of 12 Palestinians, who are accused of "inciting terrorism".
- 6 April – Kazakhstan recognizes the State of Palestine.
- 7 April – The plane carrying Palestinian president Yasser Arafat and 12 others crashes during sandstorm in Libya.
- 8 April – Wreckage of President Arafat's plane is found by a Libyan Air Force plane. Arafat is found alive and bruised while 3 of the 13 aboard the plane are found dead.
- 15 April – Azerbaijan recognizes the State of Palestine.
- 17 April – Turkmenistan recognizes the State of Palestine.
- 25 April – Georgia recognizes the State of Palestine.
- 24 May – Murder of Helena Rapp: 18-year-old Palestinian Fuad Muhammad Abdulhadi Amrin stabbed to death 15-year-old Israeli Helena Rapp. Palestinian Islamic Jihad claimed responsibility.
- 27 May – Bosnia and Herzegovina recognizes the State of Palestine. 94 countries recognized the State of Palestine by the end of 1992 which is now counted as 95 countries due to the dissolution of Czechoslovakia.
- 10 October – One Palestinian is killed and 49 injured as the IDF tried to disperse protests in the West Bank, East Jerusalem and Gaza in solidarity with the prisoner's hunger strike.

== Births ==
- 28 April – Rima Hassan, French-Palestinian activist and politician.
- 11 September – Mustafa Moien Ayyash, Palestinian journalist and founder of Gaza now.
- 17 November – Mosab Abu Toha, Palestinian poet.
- 25 November – Tamer Seyam, Palestinian footballer.

=== Full date unknown ===
- Motaz Malhees, Palestinian actor, best known for 200 Meters, and The Voice of Hind Rajab.
- Lamis Ammar, Palestinian actress best known for Sand Storm (2016).

== Deaths ==
- 13 May – Zulaija Al-Shahabi, Palestinian women's rights and anti-colonialism activist. (born 1903)

== See also ==
- 1992 in Israel
