= 1997 in Palestine =

- Decades: 1970s; 1980s; 1990s; 2000s; 2010s
- See also: History of Palestine; Timeline of Palestinian history; List of years in Palestine

Events in the year 1997 in Palestine.

== Incumbents ==
- President of Palestine – Yasser Arafat (Fatah)
- President of the Palestinian National Authority – Yasser Arafat (Fatah)
- Government of Palestine – 2nd Government of Palestine

== Events ==
- 17 January – The Protocol Concerning the Redeployment in Hebron is signed by Palestinian President Yasser Arafat and Israeli Prime Minister Benjamin Netanyahu, under the supervision of US Secretary of State Warren Christopher.
- 1 December – The Palestinian Information Center news website is established in Arabic.

== Establishments ==
- The Al-Aqsa Islamic Bank was established.
- Kfar HaOranim was founded.
- Sansana was founded.

== Sports ==
- Markaz Shabab Al-Am'ari was in the 1997 Arab Club Champions Cup.

== See also ==
- 1997 in Israel
- Palestinian law
