= 1981 in Palestine =

- Decades: 1960s; 1970s; 1980s; 1990s; 2000s
- See also: History of Palestine; Timeline of Palestinian history; List of years in Palestine

Events in the year 1981 in Palestine.

== Incumbents ==
=== PLO ===
- Chairman of the Palestine Liberation Organization – Yasser Arafat

=== Israeli Military Governorate ===
- Military Governor of the Gaza Strip – Yitzhak Segev
- Military Governor of the West Bank – Binyamin Ben-Eliezer
- Coordinator of Government Activities in the Territories – Danny Matt

== Events ==
=== January ===
- Israeli taxi driver Yehezkel Mizrahi is murdered by Palestinian militants in the Gaza Strip while taking his taxi to a garage known to be cheaper than Israeli garages for repairs.
- The Israeli government approves the establishment of three new settlements in the West Bank.

=== February ===
- 9 February: The Israeli government seizes several thousand acres of land around Salfit for the purposes of expanding the settlement of Ariel.
- 27 February: Israeli Prime Minister and Likud leader Menachem Begin visits the settlement of Elon Moreh for the first time since 1977, accompanied by several government ministers.

=== March ===
- 13 March: The Israeli government expropriates several hundred acres of land in the West Bank for the purposes of expanding the settlement of Shavei Shomron.

=== April ===
- 7 April: Palestinian Abdul Rahman Otman Mustafa Abu Hasnin dies following a controversial incident involving Israeli Border Police.
- 22 April: The Israeli government indicates that it may be willing to back down from its controversial plans to take over the Palestinian Jerusalem District Electricity Company.

=== June ===
- 1 June: PLO representative in Belgium Naim Khader is assassinated in Brussels.
- 12 June: Palestinian Mohammed Mustapha Jibril dies in an incident involving the Israeli military in Dheisheh.

=== July ===
- 29 July: A group of Palestinian militants ambushes a civilian bus near Jerusalem, severely wounding 23-year-old Israeli Dvora Arent. In response, the Israeli authorities impose a six-day curfew on several West Bank villages.

=== August ===
- 29 August: The hardline Abu Nidal Organization perpetrates the 1981 Vienna synagogue attack in Austria. The attack is widely condemned by both nationalist and moderate Palestinian mayors in the occupied territories.

=== October ===
- 23 October: 22-year-old Palestinian Fayez Tarairah dies in Israeli custody four months after his arrest in a controversial case.

=== November ===
- 1 November: Israeli academic Menahem Milson is appointed as the West Bank head of the newly reorganised Israeli Civil Administration, sparking the outbreak of the November–December 1981 Palestinian protests.
- 2 November: Balfour Day is marked by demonstrations across Palestine. The same day, the Israeli government also approves three new settlements in the Gaza Strip. Both events inflame the outbreak of the protests against the Civil Administration.
- 4 November: Israeli authorities order Birzet University closed for two months, additionally carrying out arrests of several of the university's administration and the student council.
- 17 November: Yusuf Khatib, head of the Ramallah Village League, and his son are assassinated by Palestinian militants. Following the assassination, the Israeli government begins distributing weapons to Village League members.

=== December ===
- 2 December: The December 1981 Gaza general strike breaks out as part of the protests against the Civil Administration, sparked by the Israeli government's decision to appoint General Yosef Luntz as the head of the Civil Administration in Gaza.
- Palestinian terrorist Ziad Abu Ein is extradited from the United States to Israel.

== See also ==
- 1981 in Egypt
- 1981 in Israel
- 1981 in Jordan
