= 1993 in Palestine =

- Decades: 1970s; 1980s; 1990s; 2000s; 2010s
- See also: History of Palestine; Timeline of Palestinian history; List of years in Palestine

Events in the year 1993 in Palestine.

== Incumbents ==
- President of Palestine – Yasser Arafat

== Events ==
- 16 April – Mehola Junction bombing: A Hamas militant carries out the first suicide bombing by Palestinian Arab militants from the Palestinian territories against Israeli targets. A Palestinian Arab bystander and the bomber are killed in the attack and seven IDF soldiers and a Palestinian Arab are injured.
- 20 August – The first agreement in the Oslo Accords is signed in Oslo, between by Foreign Minister Shimon Peres for Israel, Mahmoud Abbas for the Palestine Liberation Organization and Secretary of State Warren Christopher for the United States.
- 9 September – The Letters of Mutual Recognition are exchanged between Israel and the Palestine Liberation Organization. The PLO recognized Israel's right to exist in peace, renounced Palestinian militancy and terrorism, and accepted UNSC Resolution 242 and UNSC Resolution 338. Israel recognized the PLO as a legitimate authority representing the Palestinian people and agreed to commence comprehensive negotiations for the Israeli–Palestinian peace process.
- 13 September –
  - The Oslo I Accord is officially signed at a public ceremony in Washington, DC in the presence of Israeli Prime Minister Yitzhak Rabin, Palestinian President Yasser Arafat and US President Bill Clinton. The Accord provided for the creation of a Palestinian interim self-government, the Palestinian National Authority (PNA). The Palestinian Authority would have responsibility for the administration of the territory under its control. The Accords also called for the withdrawal of the Israel Defense Forces (IDF) from parts of the Gaza Strip and West Bank.
  - The First Intifada ends with the signing of the Oslo I Accord.

== Births ==
- 18 July – Mohammed Saleh, Palestinian footballer.

== See also ==
- 1993 in Israel
