= 1996 in Palestine =

- Decades: 1970s; 1980s; 1990s; 2000s; 2010s
- See also: History of Palestine; Timeline of Palestinian history; List of years in Palestine

Events in the year 1996 in Palestine.

== Incumbents ==
- President of Palestine – Yasser Arafat
- President of the Palestinian National Authority – Yasser Arafat
- Government of Palestine – 1st Government of Palestine (until 17 May) and 2nd Government of Palestine (starting 17 May)

== Events ==
- 5 January – The Mossad assassinates Yahya Ayyash, the chief bombmaker of Hamas and the leader of the West Bank battalion of the Izz ad-Din al-Qassam Brigades, via a bomb-laden mobile phone.
- 19 January – Three Hamas members are killed in an attack on an Israeli army roadblock. One Israeli soldier is injured.
- 20 January – 1996 Palestinian general election:
  - 1996 Palestinian presidential election: Incumbent Palestinian President Yasser Arafat defeats challenger Samiha Khalil, consolidating his position as president.
  - 1996 Palestinian legislative election: Fatah wins 50 seats out of 88, becoming the majority party in the Palestinian Legislative Council.
- 22 January – Yasser Arafat receives congratulatory phone calls in his Gaza headquarters. U.S. Consul General Edward R. Abington, who visited Arafat there, said their meeting was interrupted by calls from Nelson Mandela and the prime ministers of Turkey and Algeria.
- 12 February – 1996 Palestinian presidential inauguration: Palestinian President Yasser Arafat is sworn in to office and begins a new term as President of Palestine, 23 days after the election.
- 25 February – Ashkelon bus station bombing: Killing two Israelis. Hamas claims responsibility for the bombing.
- 25 February – First Jerusalem bus 18 suicide bombing: A Hamas suicide bomber blows himself up in a commuter bus in Jerusalem, killing 26 and injuring 80 others.
- 3 March – Second Jerusalem bus 18 suicide bombing: A Hamas suicide bomber detonates a bomb on a bus in Jerusalem, killing 19 and injuring six others.
- 4 March – Dizengoff Center suicide bombing: A Hamas suicide bomber detonates a bomb outside the Dizengoff Center, Tel Aviv's largest shopping mall, killing 20 and wounding 75 others, including children celebrating the Jewish Purim holiday.
- 7 March – The first Palestinian Legislative Council (PLC) is sworn in and meets for the first time, 47 days after the election. Ahmed Qurei becomes the first Speaker of the Palestinian Legislative Council.
- 24 April – After a two-day meeting in Gaza City, the PNC adopts two resolutions amending the PLO Charter.
- 9 May – Yasser Arafat announces names of new cabinet ministers.
- 15 May – Yasser Arafat tells the Palestinian National Council that it might take another week or so before he finalizes the list of portfolio assignments.
- 17 May – 2nd Government of Palestine is sworn in, with Palestinian President Yasser Arafat heading the government.
- 24 September – Israeli Prime Minister Benjamin Netanyahu authorize the opening of an exit in the Arab Quarter of Jerusalem for the Western Wall Tunnel, which prior Israeli Prime Minister Shimon Peres had instructed to be put on hold for the sake of peace. This sparked violent riots throughout the West Bank and northern Gaza Strip. Over the subsequent three days, 16 Israeli soldiers and about 60 Palestinians were killed in the riots.
- 11 December – PFLP gunmen attack a car carrying Israeli settlers near the settlement of Bet El, killing a woman and her 12-year-old son.

== See also ==
- 1996 in Israel
