= 2001 in Palestine =

- Decades: 1980s; 1990s; 2000s; 2010s; 2020s
- See also: History of Palestine · Timeline of Palestinian history · List of years in Palestine

Events in the year 2001 in Palestine.

== Incumbents ==
Palestinian National Authority (non-state administrative authority)

- President – Yasser Arafat (Fatah)
- Government of Palestine – 3rd Government of Palestine

== Events ==
=== Israeli–Palestinian conflict ===
The most prominent events related to the Israeli–Palestinian conflict which occurred during 2001 include:

- January 21–27 – Taba Summit: Peace talks between Israel and the Palestinian Authority aimed at reaching the "final status" of negotiations. Ehud Barak temporarily withdraws from negotiations during the Israeli elections, subsequently Ariel Sharon refuses to continue negotiating in the face of the newly erupted violence.

Notable Palestinian militant operations against Israeli targets

The most prominent Palestinian militant acts and operations committed against Israeli targets during 2001 include:

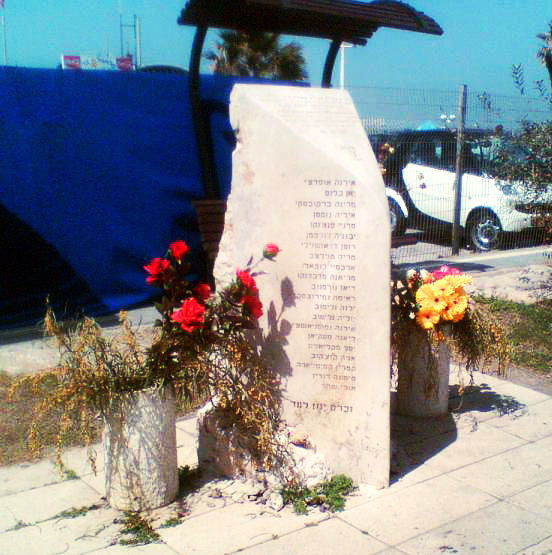
Memorial for the victims of the Dolphinarium discothèque suicide bombing

- January 1 – Netanya center bombing: 54 people are injured when a car, containing 44 pounds of explosives, explodes near a bus stop in Netanya's shopping district. Hamas claimed responsibility.
- March 1 – Mei Ami junction bombing: An Israeli is killed and nine other people are injured when a Palestinian suicide bomber detonates a bomb in a service taxi. Hamas responsibility suspected.
- March 4 – Netanya bombing: 3 elderly Israelis are killed in a suicide bombing in downtown of the coastal city of Netanya. Hamas claims responsibility.
- March 27 – Talpiot industrial zone bombing: 7 people are injured when a car explodes during the morning rush hour in the Talpiot neighborhood in southeast Jerusalem. Palestinian Islamic Jihad claimed responsibility.
- March 27 – Egged bus No. 6 French Hill junction bombing: 28 people were injured, two seriously, in a suicide bombing on a northbound No. 6 bus at the French Hill Junction. Hamas claimed responsibility.
- March 28 – Mifgash Shalom attack: 3 Israelis are killed in a suicide bombing. Hamas claims responsibility.
- April 16 - Five mortar shells land, for the first time in the history of Israel, in the Israeli city Ashdod.
- April 22 – Kfar Saba bombing: A Palestinian Arab suicide bomber kills an Israeli doctor of American origin in Kfar Saba and injures 60 others. Hamas claims responsibility.
- April 23 – Or Yehuda bombing: 8 people are lightly injured when a car explodes in the town of Or Yehuda. Hamas claimed responsibility. Hamas claimed responsibility.
- May 18 – Kenyon HaSharon bombing: 5 Israelis are killed in a suicide bombing in a shopping mall in Netanya and over 100 are wounded. Hamas claims responsibility.
- May 25 – Hadera bus station suicide bombing: at least 12 people are injured when a car explodes near the bus station in the city Hadera. Hamas claimed responsibility.
- May 27 – Jerusalem bombings: two car bombs explode in the center of Jerusalem. The explosions caused no serious injuries. PFLP claimed responsibility.
- May 30 – Netanya school bombing: a car bomb explodes outside a school in the coastal city of Netanya. The explosion caused no serious injuries. Palestinian Islamic Jihad claimed responsibility.
- June 1 – Dolphinarium discothèque suicide bombing: A Hamas suicide bomber blows himself up at the entrance of a club on a beachfront in Tel Aviv. 21 Israelis are killed and 132 were wounded, all youths.
- June 22 – Dugit bombing: 2 Israeli soldiers are killed when a Booby trapped car explodes near the Jewish settlement of Dugit. Hamas claimed responsibility.
- July 2 – Yehud suburb bombing: 2 bombs which were planted in cars of 2 Yehud residents explode. The explosion caused no serious injuries. PFLP claimed responsibility.
- July 9 – Kissufim bombing: A Palestinian suicide bomber detonates his car near a in the Southern Gaza Strip crossing point of Kissufim. The explosion caused no serious injuries. Hamas claimed responsibility.
- July 16 – Binyamina Railway Station bombing: 2 Israeli soldiers are killed and 8 civilians are injured when a Palestinian suicide bomber detonates himself near the entrance to the Binyamina railway station.
- August 7 – Zohar Shurgi, 40, of moshav Yafit, was fatally shot in a drive-by shooting on Trans-Samaria Highway.
- August 9 – Sbarro restaurant massacre: A Palestinian suicide bomber wearing an explosive belt weighing five to ten kilograms, containing explosives, nails, nuts and bolts, detonates his bomb. In the blast 15 people (including seven children) are killed, and 130 wounded. Both Hamas and the Islamic Jihad initially claim responsibility.
- August 12 – Wall-Street cafe bombing: One Israeli is killed and 15 others are injured when a Palestinian suicide bomber detonates himself at the "Wall-Street" cafe in Kiryat Motzkin. The Islamic Jihad claim responsibility.
- August 21 – Russian Compound bombing: Palestinian militants explode a bomb in the center of Jerusalem. The explosions caused no serious injuries.
- September 4 – Jerusalem car bombings: Four bombs explode at the same time in Jerusalem. The explosions caused no serious injuries.
- September 9 – Nahariya Railway Station bombing: an Arab-Israeli who was sent by Hamas detonates himself on the crowded platform of the Nahariya Railway Station, killing 3 Israelis and injuring 94. Hamas claim responsibility.
- September 9 – Beit Lid Junction bombing: 12 Israelis are injured when 2 car bombs explode near a bus at the Beit Lid junction near Netanya. The Islamic Jihad claim responsibility.
- September 15 – Meir Weisshaus, 23, of Jerusalem, was fatally shot in a drive-by shooting on the Ramot-French Hill road.
- October 1 – Talpiot neighborhood bombing
- October 7 – Erez Crossing bombing
- October 7 – Kibbutz Shluhot bombing
- October 17 – Tourism minister Rehavam Zeevi is assassinated in Jerusalem Hyatt hotel by four Palestinian Arab gunmen, members of the PFLP terrorist organization
- November 4 – Shoshana Ben Ishai, 16, of Betar Illit, and Menashe (Meni) Regev, 14, of Jerusalem were killed when a Palestinian terrorist opened fire with a sub-machine gun shortly before 16:00 at a No. 25 Egged bus at the French Hill junction in northern Jerusalem. 45 people were injured in the attack.
- November 26 – Erez Crossing bombing
- November 29 – Wadi Ara bombing: Three people are killed and nine wounded in a suicide bombing of a bus near Hadera. Both Islamic Jihad and Fatah claimed responsibility.
- December 1 – Ben Yehuda Street Bombing
- December 2 – Haifa bus No. 16 attack
- December 5 – Hilton Mamilla bombing
- December 9 – Check Post Junction bombing
- December 12 – Neve Dekalim bombing

Notable Israeli military operations against Palestinian militancy targets

The most prominent Israeli military counter-terrorism operations (military campaigns and military operations) carried out against Palestinian militants during 2001 include:

- May 7 – Israel seizes the Palestinian freighter "Santorini" near the shores of Haifa which was on her way from Lebanon to the shores of the Gaza Strip and was found to be carrying a massive amount of weaponry.
- August 27 – Abu Ali Mustafa, the General Secretary of the Popular Front for the Liberation of Palestine, is assassinated by an Israeli missile shot by an Apache helicopter through his office window in Ramallah.

== Notable deaths ==
- May 31 - Faisal Husseini, 60, Iraqi-born Palestinian politician and senior member of PLO.
- August 27 - Abu Ali Mustafa, 63 Palestinian politician, member of the PLO executive.

== See also ==
- 2001 in Israel
