= 1998 in Palestine =

- Decades: 1970s; 1980s; 1990s; 2000s; 2010s
- See also: History of Palestine; Timeline of Palestinian history; List of years in Palestine

Events in the year 1998 in Palestine.

== Incumbents ==
- President of Palestine – Yasser Arafat
- President of the Palestinian National Authority – Yasser Arafat
- Government of Palestine – 2nd Government of Palestine (until 9 August) and 3rd Government of Palestine (starting 9 August)

== Events ==
- 9 August – The 3rd Government of Palestine is sworn in, continued to be headed by Yasser Arafat.
- 23 October –
  - Palestinian President Yasser Arafat and Israeli Prime Minister Benjamin Netanyahu sign the Wye River Memorandum which details the steps to be taken by the Palestinian Authority and the Israeli government to implement the earlier Interim Agreement of 1995.
  - Malawi recognizes the State of Palestine. 101 countries recognized the State of Palestine by the end of 1998.
- 15 November – Palestine celebrates the 10th anniversary of the Palestinian Declaration of Independence.
- 24 November – The Yasser Arafat International Airport opens.

== Deaths ==
- 30 March – Elias Freij, Palestinian politician who served as the mayor of Bethlehem for 25 years.(born 1918)

== See also ==
- 1998 in Israel
