= 2003 in Palestine =

- Decades: 1980s; 1990s; 2000s; 2010s; 2020s
- See also: History of Palestine · Timeline of Palestinian history · List of years in Palestine

Events in the year 2003 in Palestine.

== Incumbents ==
Palestinian National Authority (non-state administrative authority)

- President – Yasser Arafat (Fatah)
- Prime Minister – Mahmoud Abbas (Fatah) from 19 March to 6 September, Vacant from 6 September to 7 October, Ahmed Qurei (Fatah) from 7 October
- Government of Palestine – 5th Government of Palestine (until 30 April), 6th Government of Palestine (from 30 April to 7 October), 7th Government of Palestine (from 7 October to 12 November), 8th Government of Palestine (starting 12 November)

== Events ==
- March 19, Mahmoud Abbas is appointed as the first Prime Minister of the Palestinian Authority.
- September 6, Ahmed Qurei replaces Mahmoud Abbas as Prime Minister of the Palestinian Authority.

=== Israeli–Palestinian conflict ===
The most prominent events related to the Israeli–Palestinian conflict which occurred during 2003 include:

- March 16 – Rachel Corrie, an American member of the International Solidarity Movement in Rafah, in the Gaza Strip, is killed in a residential area of Rafah by an Israel Defense Forces (IDF) bulldozer while she was kneeling in front of the home of a local Palestinian Arab, acting as a human shield and attempting to prevent IDF forces from demolishing the home. The IDF has claimed that the death was due to the restricted angle of view of the IDF Caterpillar D9 bulldozer driver, while ISM eyewitnesses said "there was nothing to obscure the driver's view."
- March 24 – Hilltop 26, an illegal Israeli settlement near the city of Hebron, is peacefully dismantled by the IDF.
- April 30 – A road map for peace sponsored by the US, UN, EU, and Russia is delivered to the Israeli government and the Palestinian Authority.
- May 25 – Israeli Prime Minister Ariel Sharon wins cabinet approval for a peace plan that includes the creation of a Palestinian Arab state by 2005.
- May 27 – Israeli prime minister Ariel Sharon states that the "occupation" of Palestinian territories is "a terrible thing for Israel and for the Palestinians" and "can't continue endlessly." Sharon's phraseology prompts shock from many in Israel, leading to a clarification that by "occupation," Sharon meant control of millions of Palestinian Arab lives rather than actual physical occupation of land.
- June 3 – Israel frees about 100 Palestinian Arab prisoners before the Mideast peace summit with President George W. Bush in a sign of goodwill.
- June 4 – "Road map" for peace: Israeli Prime Minister Sharon promises to dismantle illegal settlements in the West Bank, while new Palestinian Authority Prime Minister Mahmoud Abbas renounces all terrorism against Israel.
- August 14 – Israel frees another 76 prisoners, a week after releasing more than 300 people. Israel argues that it is a gesture of goodwill and in accordance with agreements. The Palestinian Authority disagrees and says that most were not arrested for terrorist activities, and that it was the people arrested for the latter that Israel originally agreed to release.
- September 7 – Israel's Prime Minister Ariel Sharon declares that Hamas leaders are "marked for death" and will not have a moment's rest, after Israel failed in an attempt to kill the top-ranking members of Hamas with a 550-pound bomb dropped on a Gaza City apartment.
- September 24 – A protest letter by a group of 27 Israeli pilots to the Israeli air force is publicized. In the letter, the pilots announce their refusal to fly further missions to bomb leaders of Palestinian terrorist groups in civilian areas. The pilots' letter calls the attacks "illegal and immoral". It draws quick condemnation from commentators, from politicians and from military leaders, with calls for severe punishment including jail, although a dismissal is considered the most likely result. The pilots' protest is a reaction to attacks like the one on Hamas leader Salah Shehade in July 2002, which killed Shehade, his bodyguard and 15 civilians, among them nine children.
- October 21 – The UN General Assembly approves a resolution demanding that Israel remove a security fence in the West Bank. The resolution passes by an overwhelming majority of 144 to 4 with the US voting against the motion.

Notable Palestinian militant operations against Israeli targets

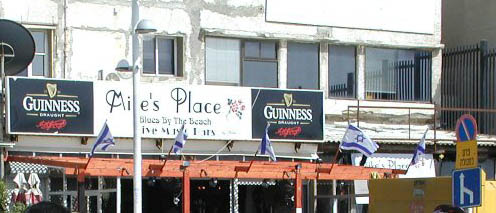
Mike's Place a few days after the suicide bombing, April 2003

The most prominent Palestinian militant acts and operations committed against Israeli targets during 2003 include:

- January 5 – Tel Aviv central bus station massacre: Two Palestinian Arab suicide bombers blow themselves up about two minutes apart at a crowded neighborhood near the Old Tel Aviv Central Bus Station, killing 23 Israelis and wounding 80 others. Both the Islamic Jihad and Hamas claim responsibility for the double bombing.
- January 13 – Tel Aviv suicide bombing
- March 5 – Haifa bus 37 suicide bombing: A Hamas suicide bomber kills 17 people and wounds 53 when he detonates a bomb hidden under his clothing on an Egged bus No. 37 in Haifa.
- March 30 – London Cafe bombing
- April 24 – Kfar Sava train station bombing: A 23-year-old Israeli security guard is killed and 13 others are wounded in a suicide bombing outside of the Kfar Saba – Nordau Railway Station. Groups related to the Al-Aqsa Martyrs' Brigades and the PFLP claim joint responsibility for the attack.
- April 30 – Mike's Place bombing: A Muslim British citizen suicide bomber blows himself up at "Mike's Place", a Tel Aviv restaurant, killing four Israelis and injuring 50 others. Hamas and Al-Aqsa Martyrs' Brigades claim joint responsibility for the attack.
- May 17 – Gross Square attack: An Israeli couple are killed by a Palestinian Arab suicide bomber in Hebron. Hamas claims responsibility for the attack.
- May 18 – Jerusalem bus 6 bombing: A Palestinian Arab suicide bomber kills seven Israelis and wounds 20 on a bus in Jerusalem's French Hill district. Hamas claims responsibility for the attack.
- May 19 – Kfar Darom bombing attack
- May 19 – Kenyon Afula bombing: A suicide bomber blows herself up at the entrance to a mall in the northern Israeli town of Afula. Three people are killed and about 60 wounded. Islamic Jihad and the Al-Aqsa Martyrs' Brigades both claim responsibility for the attack.
- May 22 – Netzarim bus bombing
- June 11 – Davidka Square bus bombing: Disguised as an Orthodox Jew, a Palestinian Arab suicide bomber blows up a bus in Jerusalem, killing at least seventeen Israelis.
- June 19 – Sdei-Trumot bombing: An Israeli shopkeeper is killed in the moshav of Sdei Trumot when a Palestinian Arab suicide bomber blows himself up inside the shop. Islamic Jihad claimed responsibility for the attack.
- July 7 – Kfar Yavetz bombing: A Palestinian Arab suicide bomber blows himself up inside a residential home in Moshav Kfar Yavetz, killing a 65-year-old Israeli woman and lightly wounding three of her grandchildren. Islamic Jihad claims responsibility for the attack.
- August 12 – Bus station Ariel bombing: Two Israelis are killed and about a dozen are wounded in two separate suicide bombings by Palestinian Arab terrorists in the towns of Rosh Ha'ayin and Ariel. Hamas and the Al-Aqsa Martyrs' Brigades claim responsibility for the attacks.
- August 12 – Rosh Ha'ayin bombing: A 43-year-old Israeli is killed by a teenage Palestinian suicide bomber who detonated himself in a Rosh Ha'ayin supermarket.
- August 19 – Jerusalem bus 2 suicide bombing: A Hamas-affiliated Palestinian Arab, disguised as a Haredi Jew, blows himself up with a bomb spiked with ball-bearings on an Egged bus No. 2 in Jerusalem, crowded with children. 23 Israelis are killed and over 130 are wounded, all civilians.
- September 9 – Tzrifin attack: A Palestinian Arab suicide bomber kills at least eight Israelis and seriously wounds 15 others at a bus stop near Tzrifin, close to Rishon LeZion. Several hours later this is followed by a second suicide bombing at a Jerusalem café, in which seven more people are killed and dozens are wounded.
- September 9 – Café Hillel bombing: Seven people are killed and over 50 wounded when a Palestinian Arab suicide bomber blows himself up at the Café Hillel in Jerusalem. Hamas claims responsibility.
- September 26 – A Palestinian Arab gunman enters a home in Negohot, an Israeli settlement in the West Bank near Hebron, and murders seven-month-old Shaked Avraham and 27-year-old Eyal Yeberbaum, and wounds both of the baby girl's parents as they are celebrating the Jewish New Year. The gunman is later killed by Israeli security forces. Islamic Jihad claims responsibility for the attack.
- October 4 – Maxim restaurant suicide bombing: A 28-year-old Palestinian Arab female suicide bomber, Hanadi Jaradat, blows herself up inside the Maxim restaurant in Haifa. 21 Israelis, Jews and Arabs, are killed, and 51 others are wounded. The restaurant is co-owned by Christian Arab and Jewish Israelis, and was a symbol of co-existence.
- October 9 – Tulkarem bombing
- October 15 – Beit Hanoun Junction bombing
- November 3 – Azun bombing
- December 25 – Geha Junction bus stop bombing: A Palestinian Arab suicide bomber blows himself up at a bus stop near Tel Aviv, killing four Israeli civilians and himself.

Notable Israeli military operations against Palestinian militancy targets

The most prominent Israeli military counter-terrorism operations (military campaigns and military operations) carried out against Palestinian militants during 2003 include:

- August 21 – Israel kills senior Hamas official, Ismail Abu Shanab, by a missile strike in the Gaza Strip.
- October 5 – Ain es Saheb airstrike: Israeli warplanes attack an alleged Islamic Jihad training base in Syria, 24 kilometres (15 mi) northwest of the Syrian capital Damascus, in response for a suicide bombing at a Haifa restaurant that killed 19 people. The Israel Defense Forces claimed the camp was used to train recruits in bomb assembly and guerrilla warfare and has released footage of the camp taken from the Al-Arabia TV station showing hundreds of weapons and tunnels packed with arms and ammunition.
- December 25 – An Israeli helicopter gunship attacks a car in Gaza City, killing Islamic Jihad commander Mekled Hameid and two fellow militants, together with two bystanders.

== Notable deaths ==
- August 21 – Ismail Abu Shanab, engineer and Hamas leader (born 1950)
- September 25 - Edward Said, 67, Palestinian-American literary theorist.

== See also ==
- 2003 in Israel
