= 1994 in Palestine =

- Decades: 1970s; 1980s; 1990s; 2000s; 2010s
- See also: History of Palestine; Timeline of Palestinian history; List of years in Palestine

Events in the year 1994 in Palestine.

== Incumbents ==
- President of Palestine – Yasser Arafat
- President of the Palestinian National Authority – Yasser Arafat (starting 5 July)
- Government of Palestine – 1st Government of Palestine (starting 5 July)

== Events ==
- 25 February – Cave of the Patriarchs massacre: Israeli Kahanist Baruch Goldstein opens fire inside the Cave of the Patriarchs, Hebron, in the West Bank; he kills 29 Muslims.
- 2 April – Tajikistan recognizes the State of Palestine.
- 6 April – Afula bus suicide bombing: Eight Israelis are killed by a Palestinian Arab suicide car bomb, which explodes in Afula.
- 13 April – Hadera central station suicide bombing: Five Israelis are killed and another 30 are wounded during a Palestinian Arab suicide attack on a public bus in Hadera during Israel's Fallen Soldiers Remembrance Day.
- 25 April – Uzbekistan recognizes the State of Palestine.

Establishment of the Palestinian National Authority:

- 4 May – Israel and the PLO sign the Gaza–Jericho Agreement. The Palestinian National Authority is formed.
- 18 May – Israeli forces withdraw from Jericho and Gaza City in compliance with the Oslo accords.
- 1 July – Palestinian President Yasser Arafat returns to Palestine after 27 years of exile by crossing the border from Egypt to the Gaza Strip, arriving first in Rafah and then Gaza City.
- 5 July – 1994 Palestinian presidential inauguration: Palestinian President Yasser Arafat is sworn in as the 1st President of the Palestinian National Authority. The 1st Government of Palestine is sworn in and holds first official meeting in Jericho. The oath was administered in front of Muslim, Christian and Jewish clerics.
- 26 July – 1994 London Israeli embassy bombing: A vehicle packed with 30 pounds of explosives exploded at the Israeli Embassy in London, wounding 20. Five Palestinians were arrested in London in January 1995 in connection with both bombings.
- 4 October – Papua New Guinea recognizes the State of Palestine. 98 countries recognized the State of Palestine by the end of 1994.
- 9 October – Kidnapping of Nachshon Wachsman: IDF soldier Corporal Nachshon Wachsman is kidnapped by Hamas militants disguised as Jewish settlers. They later demand the release of Sheikh Ahmed Yassin and another 200 Palestinian Arab prisoners from Israeli prison in return for Wachsman's release.
- 14 October – Israeli elite special forces unit Sayeret Matkal attempt to free the kidnapped IDF hostage Nachshon Wachsman held by Palestinian assailants in the village of Bir Nabala in the West Bank; Wachsman and Nir Poraz, the commander of the rescue force, are killed by the assailants during the raid.
- 19 October – Dizengoff Street bus bombing: 21 Israelis and a Dutch national are killed after a suicide attack on a bus in Tel Aviv. This was the first major suicide bombing in Tel Aviv. Hamas claims responsibility for the bombing.
- 11 November – Netzarim Junction bicycle bombing: Three Israeli soldiers are killed when a Palestinian Arab detonated explosives strapped to his body as he rode his bicycle into an Israeli Army checkpoint at a road junction close to the former Israeli settlement of Netzarim.
- 30 November – 19-year-old female Israeli soldier Sgt. Liat Gabai is axed to death by the Palestinian Arab Islamic militant Wahib Abu Alrub in the center of the Israeli city of Afula.
- 10 December – Palestinian President Yasser Arafat, Israeli Prime Minister Yitzhak Rabin, and Israeli Minister of Foreign Affairs Shimon Peres receive the Nobel Peace Prize.
- 25 December – Jerusalem Binyanei HaUma suicide bombing: 13 people are injured by a suicide bomber in Jerusalem. Hamas claims responsibility.

== Births ==
- 27 February – Yacoub Shaheen, Palestinian Assyrian singer.
- 17 March – Huda Ammori, British activist of Palestinian and Iraqi heritage, co-founder of Palestine Action.
- 24 March – Rami Hamadeh,Palestinian footballer.

== Deaths ==
- December – Jabra Ibrahim Jabra, Palestinian writer and intellectual. (Born 1919)

== See also ==
- 1994 in Israel
