= 1991 in Palestine =

- Decades: 1970s; 1980s; 1990s; 2000s; 2010s
- See also: History of Palestine; Timeline of Palestinian history; List of years in Palestine

Events in the year 1991 in Palestine.

== Incumbents ==
- President of Palestine – Yasser Arafat

== Events ==
- 14 January – Salah Khalaf, also known as Abu Iyad, is assassinated.
- 1 July – Eswatini (then Swaziland) recognizes the State of Palestine. 87 countries recognized the State of Palestine by the end of 1991 which is now counted as 90 countries due to the 1991 dissolution of the Soviet Union and the 1992 dissolution of Czechoslovakia.
- 18 October – Al-Azhar University – Gaza opens in Gaza City with a two-story building and 725 students enrolled in two faculties.
- 30 October-1 November – The Madrid Conference of 1991 takes place over 3 days. Some consider the end of the conference to be the last day of the First Intifada while others consider 13 September 1993, the day the Oslo I Accord was signed, as the last day.

== Births ==
- 10 March – Bahaa al-Farra, Palestinian Olympic sprinter.
- 24 June – Hiba Abu Nada,Palestinian poet and writer. (d.2023)

== Deaths ==
- 14 January – Salah Khalaf, also known as Abu Iyad, 57, Palestinian militant and the deputy chief and head of intelligence for the Palestine Liberation Organization.

== See also ==
- 1991 in Israel
