= Mazen Faqha =

Hamas military commander (1978-2017)

Mazen Muhammad Suleiman Faqha (Arabic: مازن فقها, romanized: Māzen Faqhā; 24 August 1979 – 24 March 2017) was a senior commander in the Izz al-Din al-Qassam Brigades, the military wing of the Islamic Resistance Movement (Hamas). He was sentenced by Israel to 9 life terms in 2003 for his involvement in the planning and execution of multiple terrorist acts beginning in 2001. He was released as part of the 2011 Gilad Shalit prisoner exchange and deported to Gaza. After his release, he was one of the founders and leaders of Hamas' section in the West Bank.

== Biography ==
Faqha was born in 1978. He was from Tubas, northeast of Nablus in the West Bank. He completed his education in Tubas, then studied economics at An-Najah National University in Nablus. During his first year at the university, he joined the Izz ad-Din al-Qassam Brigades, Hamas' military wing.

He was arrested in Tubas on 5 August 2002, during the Second Intifada and jailed by Israel in 2003 for planning attacks against Israelis. He was sentenced to nine life terms for his role in the Meron Junction Bus 361 attack that left nine Israelis dead, but was one of more than 1,000 Palestinians released and deported to Gaza as part of the Gilad Shalit prisoner exchange in 2011. He was also associated with the Sbarro restaurant suicide bombing.

After his release, Faqha and Abd el-Rahman Ghanimat founded Hamas' West Bank section, which operated under Saleh al-Arouri, and consisted of fighters from the West Bank who had been deported to Gaza. At his death, Faqha was one of Hamas' senior military commanders in the West Bank.

== Death and aftermath ==
Faqha was fatally shot in the head and chest in front of his home in an apparently professional hit job in the Tel al-Hawa neighborhood of Gaza City on 24 March 2017. Thousands of people attended his funeral. After the assassination, the Israeli Defense Force Southern Command was placed on high alert, as Israel feared retaliation from Hamas. At Faqha's funeral procession in Gaza City on March 25, marchers shouted, "Revenge, revenge." Khalil al-Hayya, deputy to Yahya Sinwar, promised retaliation. Hamas set up checkpoints throughout Gaza and barred residents and foreign workers from leaving.

Hamas announced on 11 May that it had arrested Faqha's alleged killer. Hamas international spokesman Husam Badran and newly elected Hamas political leader Ismail Haniyeh stated that the assassin had been working with Israel, but he did not identify them. Israel did not issue a comment on the killing.

According to the Times of Israel, Faqha's assassination at his beachfront home in Gaza shocked Hamas and may have been Israel sending a message that Hamas leaders were not safe even during times of relative calm in the conflict. However, there was no evidence linking the hit with Israel.

Hamas announced that it would execute the three men it blamed for Faqha's death on 25 May. Amnesty International stated that the trial "utterly disregarded international fair trial standards" and the execution would "constitute an appalling breach of international human rights law." According to Palestinian Basic Law of 2003, PA President Mahmoud Abbas must approve death sentences. However, Hamas had carried out executions in the Gaza Strip since 2010 without obtaining such approval. Hamas conducted the executions as planned, hanging two of the men and killing one by firing squad. The execution was livestreamed by the Gaza Now News Network. Human Rights Watch condemned the executions in a statement.

On 8 June, Israel arrested seven Arabs it said were involved in a plot to kill Israeli soldiers to avenge Faqha's killing.

== See also ==
- Human rights in the Gaza Strip
- Targeted killing by Israel
- Sinai insurgency § In the Gaza Strip
