= 1989 in Palestine =

- Decades: 1960s; 1970s; 1980s; 1990s; 2000s
- See also: History of Palestine; Timeline of Palestinian history; List of years in Palestine

Events in the year 1989 in Palestine.

== Incumbents ==
- President of Palestine – Yasser Arafat (starting 2 April)
- Chairman of the Palestine Liberation Organization – Yasser Arafat

== Events ==
- 2 January – Rwanda recognizes the State of Palestine.
- 4 February – Ethiopia and Iran recognizes the State of Palestine.
- 8 March – PLO Chairman Yasser Arafat visits Pakistan and lays the cornerstone for a Palestinian embassy in Islamabad.
- 21 March – 1989 Tel Aviv stabbing attack: A knife-wielding Palestinian Arab attacks Israeli civilians at random in Tel Aviv, killing two and wounding a third.
- 2 April –
  - 1989 Palestinian presidential election: The Central Council of the Palestine National Council, the governing body of the PLO, elects Yasser Arafat as President of Palestine.
  - 1989 Palestinian presidential inauguration: Yasser Arafat assumes office as the first president of the State of Palestine, the same day he was elected.
- 10 April – Lone gunman wearing an Israeli army-issue uniform shot down four Arabs outside Jerusalem's Old City with a sub-machine gun. Sicarii claims responsibility for the shooting.
- 3 May – Hamas; Kidnapping and murder of Avi Sasportas and Ilan Saadon.
- 12 May – Benin, Equatorial Guinea, and Kenya recognizes the State of Palestine.
- 19 May – First Intifada: The Palestinian leader Ahmed Yassin, the founder and spiritual leader of Hamas, was arrested by Israel. Yassin was later on sentenced to life imprisonment for his involvement in attacks against Israelis.
- 6 July – Tel Aviv Jerusalem bus 405 attack: The first Palestinian Arab suicide attack is carried out inside Israel's borders on a crowded Egged bus when a Palestinian Islamic Jihad member seizes the steering wheel from the driver and pulls the bus over a steep precipice into a ravine in the area of Qiryat Ye'arim. 16 passengers are killed.
- 21 August – Vanuatu recognizes the State of Palestine.
- 4 September – The Philippines recognizes the State of Palestine. 86 countries recognized the State of Palestine by the end of 1989 which is now counted as 89 countries due to the 1991 dissolution of the Soviet Union and the 1992 dissolution of Czechoslovakia.
- 21 September – Palestinian president Yasser Arafat holds a press conference with Egyptian president Hosni Mubarak, after having a meeting with him, where he endorses open talks with Israel, urges citizens to resist the most recent crackdown on Palestinians in the West Bank and Gaza Strip, and answers and debates with Israeli journalists.

== Births ==
- 1 September – Mohammed Assaf, Palestinian pop singer and winner of the 2nd season of Arab idol.

== See also ==
- 1989 in Israel
