= 1984 in Palestine =

- Decades: 1960s; 1970s; 1980s; 1990s; 2000s
- See also: History of Palestine; Timeline of Palestinian history; List of years in Palestine

Events in the year 1984 in Palestine.

== Incumbents ==
- Chairman of the Palestine Liberation Organization – Yasser Arafat

== Events ==
- January 10 – Two hand grenades are found at the Haram Al Ibrahimi in Hebron. The attack was attributed to the organization Terror against Terror.
- March 4 – Gunmen opened fire on a bus in Ramallah, injuring at least six Palestinian workers. Terror against Terror claimed responsibility.
- April 13 – Two Palestinians who were captured after a bus hijacking are killed by Shin Bet officers, attempts to later coverup the scandal were termed the Kav 300 affair.
- April 29 – Three Members of a Jewish terrorist organization attach explosives to buses of Arab drivers in Jerusalem, the bombs were dismantled and the perpetrators arrested.
- September 22 – Four Palestinians are injured in a grenade attack on a cafe in Jerusalem.
- 21 November – 23 year old Birzeit university student, Sharaf Tibi from Khan Yunis, is shot and killed by Israeli soldiers.
- October 29 – An Israeli soldier, David Ben Shimol, fires a "Kav" rocket at a Palestinian bus, killing one person and injuring ten others. The same soldier was later charged with the 22 September attack on a cafe.

Full date unknown

- Israeli authorities arrest Ahmed Yassin, the founder of Hamas, and sentence him for 13 years in prison on charges of alleged possession of weapons.

== Births ==
Full date Unknown

- Wissam Nassar, Photojournalist from Gaza.
- Mohammed Omer, Award winning Palestinian Journalist.
- Ahmad Balshe (Belly), Palestinian-Canadian rapper and singer.
- Bassel al-Araj, Palestinian activist and writer.(died 2017)

== Deaths ==
- 23 January –Muin Bseiso – Palestinian poet. (Born 1926)

== See also ==
- 1984 in Israel
