= United Nations Security Council Resolution 681 =

UN Security Council Resolution 681
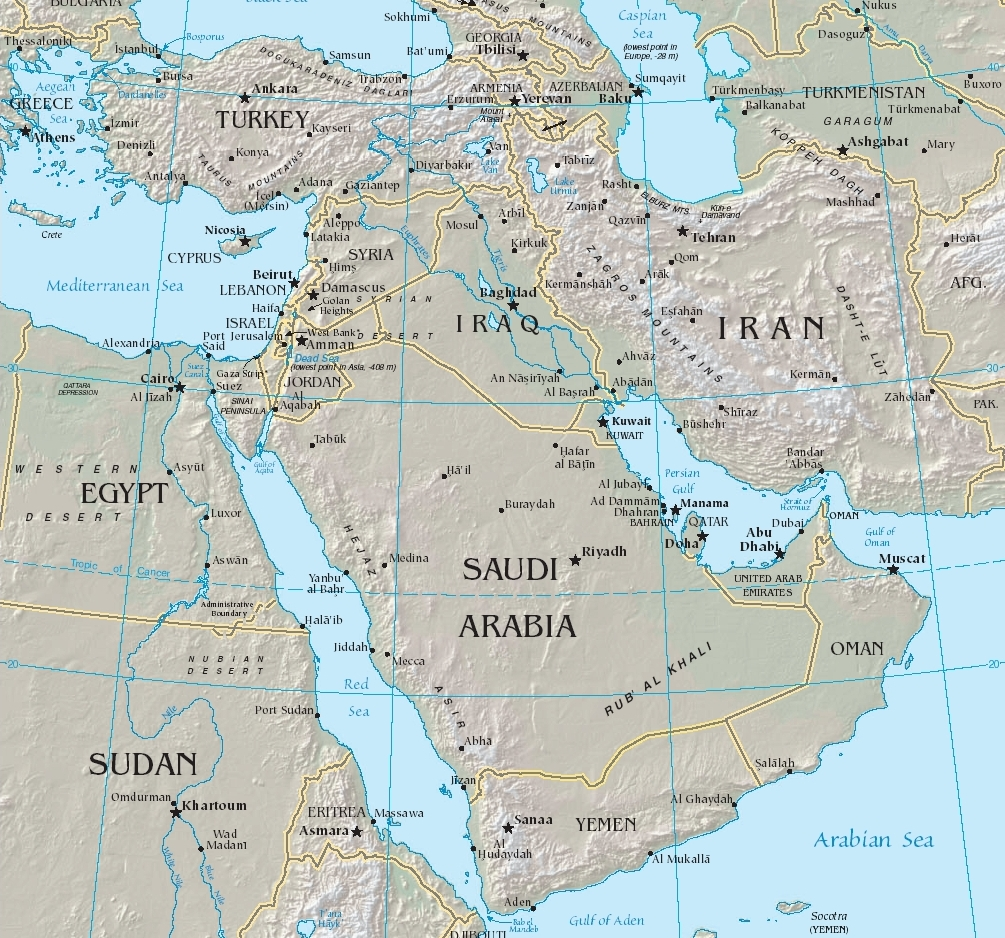
- The Middle East
- Date: 20 December 1990
- Meeting no.: 2,970
- Code: S/RES/681 (Document)
- Subject: Territories occupied by Israel
- Voting summary: 15 voted for; None voted against; None abstained
- Result: Adopted

Security Council composition
- Permanent members: China; France; Soviet Union; United Kingdom; United States
- Non-permanent members: Canada; Colombia; Côte d'Ivoire; Cuba; Ethiopia; Finland; Malaysia; Romania; Yemen; Zaire

United Nations Security Council resolution 681, adopted unanimously on 20 December 1990, after receiving the report from the Secretary-General Javier Pérez de Cuéllar authorised in Resolution 672 (1990) regarding the riots at Temple Mount, the council expressed its concern over Israel's rejection of resolutions 672 (1990) and 673 (1990).

The Council went on to condemn Israel for its decision to resume the deportation of Palestinians from the occupied territories, urging the Israeli government to accept the de jure applicability of the Fourth Geneva Convention of 1949 and abide by it. Israel said they were deported for "inciting violence".

Resolution 681 went on to request the Secretary-General, in accordance with his recommendation in the report, to examine possible measures that may be taken by him, the High Contracting Parties of the Fourth Convention and the International Committee of the Red Cross, under the convention, reporting to the council the progress of discussions. It also required the Secretary-General to continue to monitor the situation in the area, reporting back in the first week of March 1991 and every four weeks thereafter.

The resolution was passed during tensions regarding the invasion of Kuwait by Iraq, with which Saddam Hussein had been attempting to link the resolution of the Kuwaiti problem with a solution to the Palestinian issue.

== See also ==
- Arab–Israeli conflict
- First Intifada
- Israeli–Palestinian conflict
- List of United Nations Security Council Resolutions 601 to 700 (1987–1991)
