= 1995 in Palestine =

- Decades: 1970s; 1980s; 1990s; 2000s; 2010s
- See also: History of Palestine; Timeline of Palestinian history; List of years in Palestine

Events in the year 1995 in Palestine.

== Incumbents ==
- President of Palestine – Yasser Arafat
- President of the Palestinian National Authority – Yasser Arafat
- Government of Palestine – 1st Government of Palestine

== Events ==
- 22 January – Beit Lid massacre: 19 Israelis, mostly soldiers, are killed and 62 others are injured when two Palestinian suicide bombers detonated themselves at the Beit Lid junction near Netanya. The Palestinian Islamic Jihad claim responsibility.
- 15 February – South Africa recognizes the State of Palestine.
- 9 April – Kfar Darom bus attack
- 24 July – Ramat Gan bus 20 bombing
- 21 August – Ramat Eshkol bus bombing
- 24 September – The first signatures of the Oslo II Accord is signed in Taba, Egypt by Palestinian President Yasser Arafat and Israeli Foreign Minister Shimon Peres.
- 28 September – The Oslo II Accord is officially signed at a public ceremony in Washington, DC by Israeli Prime Minister Yitzhak Rabin and Palestinian President Yasser Arafat and witnessed by US President Bill Clinton, which includes provision for the transfer of control of Bethlehem, Jenin, Nablus, Qalqilya, Ramallah, Tulkarm and some 450 villages to the Palestinian Authority.
- 26 October – Mossad agents assassinate Islamic Jihad leader Fathi Shaqaqi in his hotel in Malta.
- 1 November – Kyrgyzstan recognizes the State of Palestine. 100 countries recognized the State of Palestine by the end of 1995.
- 12 December – The city of Nablus passes from Israeli to Palestinian Authority control.
- 21 December – The city of Bethlehem passes from Israeli to Palestinian Authority control.

== Deaths ==
- 26 October – Fathi Shaqaqi, 44, Palestinian physician, militant leader and the founder and Secretary-General of the Palestinian Islamic Jihad (PIJ)

== See also ==
- 1995 in Israel
