= 2002 in Palestine =

- Decades: 1980s; 1990s; 2000s; 2010s; 2020s
- See also: History of Palestine · Timeline of Palestinian history · List of years in Palestine

Events in the year 2002 in Palestine.

== Incumbents ==
Palestinian National Authority (non-state administrative authority)

- President – Yasser Arafat (Fatah)
- Government of Palestine – 3rd Government of Palestine (until 13 June), 4th Government of Palestine (from 13 June to 29 October), and 5th Government of Palestine (starting 29 October)

== Events ==
- January 2 - Karine A Affair: Israeli naval commando captures the Palestinian Authority owned freighter "Karin A" in the Red Sea, en route to Gaza. The vessel is found to be carrying 50 tons of weapons from Iran, including short-range Katyusha rockets, antitank missiles and high explosives.
- February 16 – Karnei Shomron pizzeria bombing: Three Israeli teenagers are killed in a suicide bombing at a pizzeria in the Israeli settlement of Karnei Shomron in the northern West Bank. The PFLP claims responsibility.
- February 22 – Bombing attack on a supermarket in the Israeli settlement of Efrat.
- March 7 – Bombing attack on a hotel in Ariel.
- March 29 – May 3 Operation Defensive Shield – Large-scale Israeli operation conducted into Palestinian towns and villages in the West Bank aimed at halting Palestinian suicide bombings against civilians in Israel during the Second Intifada.
- March 31 – Bombing attack on a medical center in the Israeli settlement of Efrat.
- April – The Israeli government approves the construction of a continuous security barrier which would separate the Palestinians in the West Bank from Israeli population centers, in order to prevent the infiltration of Palestinian Arab terrorists.
- April 1 - April 11 Battle of Jenin – Israel attacks Palestinian militants in the city of Jenin.
- April 2 – May 10 Battle of Bethlehem – Israel occupies Bethlehem and tries to capture wanted Palestinian militants who were hiding in the Church of the Nativity.
- April 3 – April 8 Battle of Nablus – Israel attacks Palestinian militants in the city of Nablus.
- April 15 – Palestinian political figure Marwan Barghouti is captured by the Israel Defense Forces in Palestinian Authority administered city of Ramallah.
- June 22 – Israel launches Operation Determined Path.
- July 16 – Emmanuel bus attack: Nine Israelis are killed in an attack on Dan bus No. 189 traveling from Bnei Brak to Emmanuel in the northern West Bank.
- July 22 – An Israeli warplane fires a one-ton bomb at an apartment in a densely populated neighborhood of Gaza City, killing Salah Shehade, top commander of Hamas's military wing (the Izz ad-Din al-Qassam Brigades), and 14 civilians are killed including Shehade's wife and nine children.
- August 14 – Palestinian leader Marwan Barghouti is sentenced to five life sentences after being convicted by a civilian Israeli court on charges of murdering Israeli civilians and membership in a terrorist organisation.
- October 25 – Hundreds of Israeli soldiers, backed by scores of tanks and other military vehicles, take control of the Palestinian administered city of Jenin in response to a suicide bombing that killed 14 people.

== Notable deaths ==
- August 16 - Abu Nidal, 65, founder of Fatah - The Revolutionary Council, a militant Palestinian group, commonly known as the Abu Nidal Organization.

== See also ==
- 2002 in Israel
