= 1999 in Palestine =

- Decades: 1970s; 1980s; 1990s; 2000s; 2010s
- See also: History of Palestine; Timeline of Palestinian history; List of years in Palestine

Events in the year 1999 in Palestine.

== Incumbents ==
- President of Palestine – Yasser Arafat (Fatah)
- President of the Palestinian National Authority – Yasser Arafat (Fatah)
- Government of Palestine – 3rd Government of Palestine

== Events ==
- 29 April – The Palestinian Central Council decided to put off declaring independence until after the Israeli elections, triggering riots in the territories.
- 4 May – The five-year interim period, which was agreed to in the 1993 Oslo I Accord and began with the signing of the Gaza–Jericho Agreement on 4 May 1994, ends without reaching a comprehensive peace agreement.
- 3 June – 3,000 Palestinians participated in a "Day of Rage"/"Day of Wrath" in protest of the expansion of Israeli settlements in the West Bank at the call of the Palestinian Authority. Sociologist Baruch Kimmerling notes the result of the call was ultimately "minimal."
- 17 June – The Palestinian Authority joined the Parliamentary Union of the OIC Member States upon its inception in Iran.
- 4 September – Palestinian President Yasser Arafat and Israeli Prime Minister Ehud Barak signed the Sharm el-Sheikh Memorandum, an interim peace agreement.
- 10 September – The Israeli government pre-emptively handed civilian control of 7% of the West Bank to the Palestinian Authority, the first transfer of legal authority in 1999, in preparation for peace talks later that week.
- 13 September–3 October – Bilateral negotiations over Palestine's final status are conducted but no deal was signed due to disputes over Jerusalem, Palestinian refugees, and travel rights between Gaza and the West Bank.
- General trends
  - Unemployment in the West Bank was estimated at 9.6%.
  - Unemployment in Gaza was estimated at 17%.

== Deaths ==
- 10 September – Mohammed Shreiteh, father of eight who allegedly sustained terminal injuries stemming from police beating him a day earlier while he was in custody, died in Hebron.
- 3 December – Mahmoud Mohammed al-Bajjali, father of three who died in prison after serving five years in prison without trial, died in Ramallah.

== See also ==
- 1999 in Israel
