= 2000 in Palestine =

- Decades: 1980s; 1990s; 2000s; 2010s; 2020s
- See also: History of Palestine · Timeline of Palestinian history · List of years in Palestine

Events in the year 2000 in Palestine.

== Incumbents ==
Palestinian National Authority (non-state administrative authority)

- President – Yasser Arafat (Fatah)
- Government of Palestine – 3rd Government of Palestine

== Events ==
- May 2000 – Al Deira Hotel is established.

=== Israeli–Palestinian conflict ===
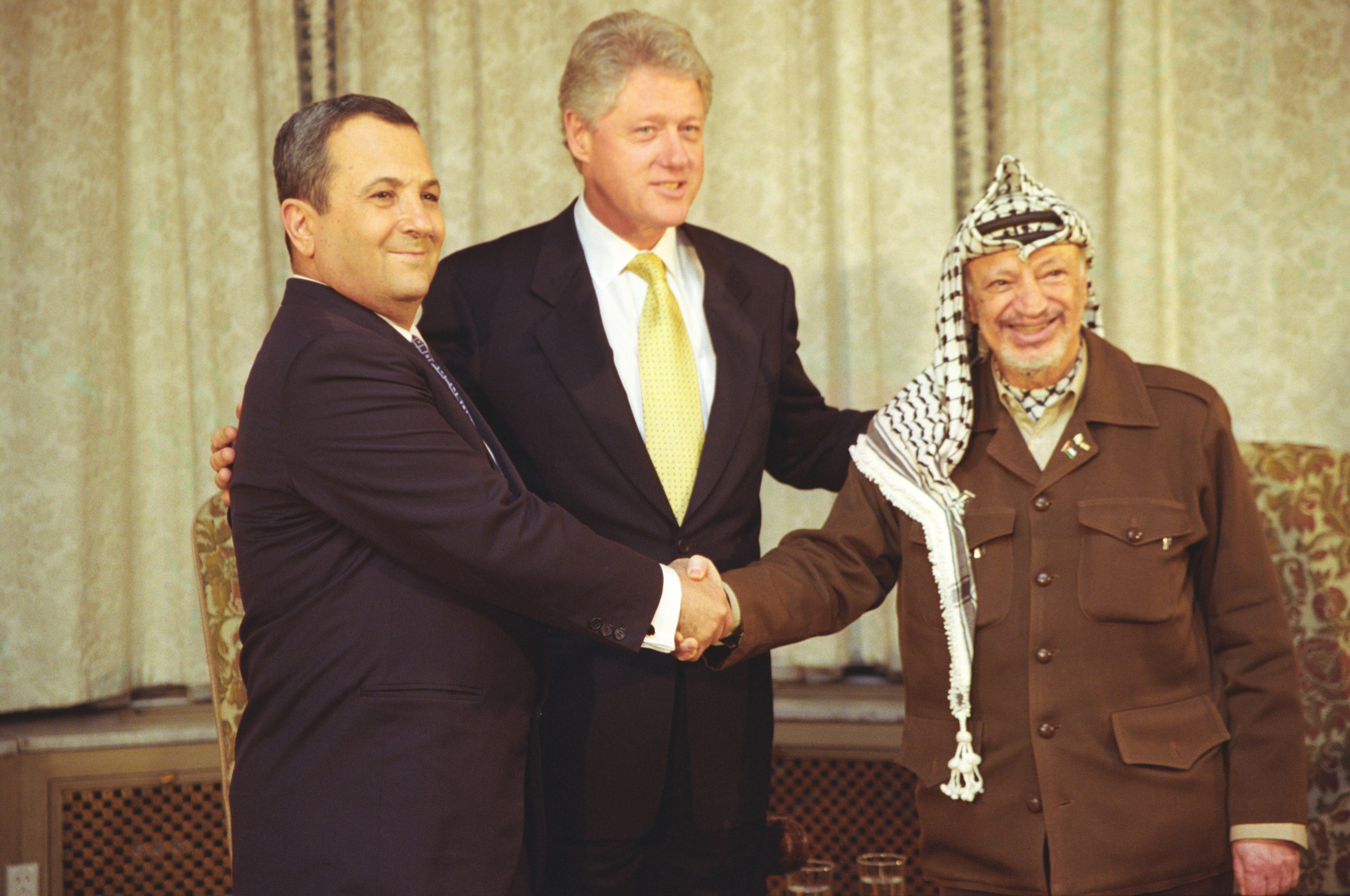
Ehud Barak, Bill Clinton, and Yasser Arafat during the 2000 Camp David Summit

The most prominent events related to the Israeli–Palestinian conflict which occurred during 2000 include:

- July 11–25 – The Camp David 2000 Summit is held which is aimed at reaching a "final status" agreement. The summit collapses after Yasser Arafat would not accept a proposal drafted by American and Israeli negotiators. Ehud Barak is prepared to offer the entire Gaza Strip, part of East Jerusalem as capital of a Palestinian Arab state, 73% of the West Bank (excluding eastern Jerusalem) raising to 90–94% after 10–25 years, and financial reparations for Palestinian Arab refugees for peace. Arafat turns down the offer without making a counter-offer.
- September 28 – Israeli opposition leader Ariel Sharon visits the Temple Mount, protected by a several-hundred-strong Israeli police force. Riots by Palestinian Arabs erupt, leading to a full-fledged armed uprising and the start of the Second Intifada (also called the Al-Aqsa Intifada by sympathizers and the Oslo War by opponents).
- October 12 – 2000 Ramallah lynching – A Palestinian Arab mob lynches two Israel Defense Forces reservists, Vadim Nurzhitz and Yossi Avrahami, who had accidentally entered the Palestinian Authority-controlled city of Ramallah in the West Bank. The brutality of the event, captured in a photo of one of the perpetrators proudly waving his blood-stained hands to the crowd below, sparks international outrage and further intensifies the ongoing conflict between Israel and Palestinian Arabs.

Notable Palestinian militant operations against Israeli targets

The most prominent Palestinian militant acts and operations committed against Israeli targets during 2000 include:

- November 2 – 2 Israelis are killed and 10 are wounded when a car bomb explodes near the Mahane Yehuda Market in Jerusalem, one of the victims was Ayelet Hashahar-Levy, the daughter of the MK and former housing minister Yitzhak Levy. Islamic Jihad claims responsibility for the attack.
- November 20 – Kfar Darom bombing: an Israeli school bus was struck by a roadside bomb at the Jewish settlement of Kfar Darom killing 2 adults and injuring several others. Hamas claimed responsibility.
- November 22 – Hadera's main street bombing: Two Israeli women are killed and 60 civilians are wounded in a car bomb attack in Hadera. Hamas claimed responsibility.
- December 22 – Mechola bombing: Palestinian suicide bomber injures 3 Israeli soldiers. Hamas claimed responsibility.

Notable Israeli military operations against Palestinian militancy targets

The most prominent Israeli military counter-terrorism operations (military campaigns and military operations) carried out against Palestinian militants during 2000 include:

- September 30 – Second Intifada: Muhammad al-Durrah incident – Ten Palestinian Arabs are killed during crossfire between Israeli forces and Palestinian Arab militia at the Netzarim junction, among them the twelve-year-old boy Muhammad al-Durrah who is caught in the crossfire and is killed in the arms of his father. Al-Durrah's death was filmed by a Palestinian Arab freelance cameraman, and as a result Al-Durrah became a symbol of the Palestinian Arab uprising in 2000 and of Palestinian martyrdom. Whether the Israeli forces or the Palestinian Arab militia shot the boy is a matter of dispute.

== Deaths ==
- 24 June – Hanna Batatu, Palestinian Marxist historian. (born 1926)
- 9 September – Bashir Barghouti, communist leader and journalist.
- 30 September – Muhammad al-Durrah, a 12-year-old boy whose death made worldwide headlines.
- 12 October –Vadim Nurzhitz and Yossi Avrahami, Israel Defense Forces reservists, killed in Ramallah.

== See also ==
- 2000 in Israel
