= Mustafa Moien Ayyash =

Palestinian journalist

- Born: Mustafa Moien Mahmoud Ayyash; September 18, 1992 (age 34); Nuseirat refugee camp, Deir al-Balah Governorate, Gaza Strip, Palestine
- Education: Al-Ahliyya Amman University; Karabük University
- Occupation: Journalist
- Years active: 2006 – present
- Known for: Gaza Now

Mustafa Moien Mahmoud Ayyash (born 1992), commonly known as Mustafa Moien Ayyash or Mustafa Ayyash, is a Palestinian journalist. He is the founder and director of the Palestinian news channel Gaza Now.

== Early life and education ==
Mustafa Moien Mahmoud Ayash was born in the Nuseirat refugee camp in the middle of the Gaza Strip on September 18, 1992 in a Palestinian muslim family.

== Gaza war ==
Gaza Now, the news agency established by Mustafa Ayyash in 2005, played a vital role to publish news about the 2023 Gaza war. His family was killed in an Israeli airstrike on the Nuseirat refugee camp in the central Gaza Strip, after Israeli aircraft targeted his home on November 22, 2023. His father, mother, spouses, children, sisters and their spouses and children, along with other displaced persons in his family home were killed. His brother Muhammad Ayyash, the photojournalist of the Gaza Now, was also killed during the attack. The Permanent Observer of Palestine at the United Nations Salah Abdel-Shafi and Chairman of Hamas Political Bureau Ismail Haniyeh mourned the death of his family. The United Nations mistakenly used the name of Mustafa Ayyash instead of Muhammad Ayyash in a report on the Killing of journalists in the Gaza war. The killing of Mustafa Ayyash was not published anywhere except the UN report. The Israeli media used the report to make doubt on the Gaza Now after announcing the US sanction. Ayyash tried to file a complaint against Israel after his family was killed but the authorities declined to receive a complaint against Israel.

== Arrest and sanctions ==
The United States Department of the Treasury announced a sanction against Mustafa Ayyash on 27 March 2024. Britain also announced sanctions against him on the allegation of providing financial services to Hamas.

Mustafa Ayyash was arrested by the Austrian Police on April 18, 2024 after the sanctions of the United States and Britain. The Austrian police also accessed his WhatsApp account, which was followed by 300,000 users, and closed it, in addition to closing the channel's Facebook pages and accounts, which were followed by 8 million users.

== See also ==
- Yahya Ayyash
- Gaza Now
