= Al-Aqsa Islamic Bank =

Bank in Palestine

- Formation: 1997
- Founder: Individuals connected to Hamas. (Note: According to U.S. Patriot Act-linked investigations)
- Type: International financial institution
- Purpose: Allegedly to serve as the finance arm of Hamas. (Note: Alleged by the United States government under George W. Bush in December 2001.)
- Headquarters: Palestine

Al-Aqsa Islamic Bank was established by Hamas in the Palestinian territories in 1997 to serve as the organization's financial arm. The bank laundered and transferred money on behalf of U.S.-terrorist designated Hamas until its assets were frozen by the U.S. authorities in 2001. The bank's licence was revoked in 2010.

== Background ==
Although Islamic finance contains many prohibitions—such as on consumption of alcohol, gambling, uncertainty, etc. – the belief that "all forms of interest are riba and hence prohibited" is the idea upon which it is based. The word "riba" literally means "excess or addition", and has been translated as "interest", "usury", "excess", "increase" or "addition". Related prohibitions exist in the older Abrahamic religions, Christianity and Judaism. The Catholic Church forbids usury, but began to relax its ban on all interest in the 16th century.

During the 2008 financial crisis, Islamic banks were not initially impacted by the "toxic assets" built up on the balance sheets of US banks as these were not Sharia-compliant and not owned by Islamic banks. In 2009, the official newspaper of the Vatican (L'Osservatore Romano) put forward the idea that "the ethical principles on which Islamic finance is based may bring banks closer to their clients and to the true spirit which should mark every financial service".

== Establishment ==
Al-Aqsa Islamic Bank was established with $20 million in capital and became operative in 1999. Contributions from charities and individual supported the establishment of the bank, although Hamas received a major contribution in 1998 from the owner of the Saudi Al-Baraka Bank Saleh Abdullah Kamel and from Jordan Islamic Bank, a subsidiary of al-Baraka.

== Accusations of connections to terrorism ==
The bank were accused of indirect links to Osama bin Laden, because depositor Saleh Abdullah Kamel had provided significant financial support to Osama bin Laden in 1983. In 1983, Bin Laden was fighting against the Soviet Union in Afghanistan, and is widely believed to have been supported by the United States as well as Saudis. The Saudi millionaire appeared on the list of purported sponsors of al-Qaeda that was seized in Sarajevo in 2002 during a raid of the premised of the Benevolence International Foundation. The operation, led by Bosnian police, uncovered what has been later labeled as "The Golden Chain", a list later vouched by Sudanese al-Qaeda defector Jamal al-Fadl that included 20 top Saudi and Gulf States financial sponsors.

Al-Aqsa Islamic Bank was 20% owned by Beit el-Mal Holdings, an investment group based in the West Bank with chapters in East Jerusalem and Gaza. Investigations by the United States government, in association with the Patriot Act, found that the two financial institutions shared senior officers and directors, and a majority of their shareholders were renown to be affiliated with Hamas. Mohammed Sarsour, a U.S. citizen who served as the vice president of Bir Zeit University, was both Deputy General of Al-Aqsa Islamic Bank and General Manager of Beit al-Mal Holdings.

Beit al-Mal itself was originally established to fundraise and transfer money for associations that the PLO-led Palestinian Authority had identified as associated with Hamas. Both Al-Aqsa Islamic Bank and Beit al-Mal Holdings are part owners of Sinokrot Global group and "cooperatively act[ed] as a buffer between Hamas and its donors".

On 4 December 2001 after suicide attacks in Israel that killed 25 and injured over 200, the U.S. authorities under the authority of President George W Bush's Executive Order No. 13224 designated Hamas as a terrorist organization with “global reach”, and froze the assets of the Holy Land Foundation for Relief and Development, Beit al-Mal Holdings, and Al-Aqsa Islamic Bank. The three entities were providing financial and material support to Hamas.

The Palestinian Monetary Authority canceled the license of the bank as of 1 April 2010.

== Cooperation with Citigroup ==
Shortly before the bank started operations, several of its employers and board members were accused of being affiliations with Hamas by representatives of the United States (who did not clearly specify whether these individuals were connected to the political, religious, or militant wing of Hamas). As a result, the bank has difficulties with international transactions; a number of banks refused to clear its transactions.

In particular, Al-Aqsa Islamic Bank's money laundering operation on behalf of Hamas cost the bank the possibility to do business in Israel. Therefore, in order to evade Israeli sanctions, Al-Aqsa Bank embarked on joint projects with Citigroup, intertwining itself the bank's Israeli division.

The joint projects with Citigroup led to the establishment of a joint database for Israel. Moreover, the cooperation between Citibank and Al-Aqsa Islamic Bank expanded to the extent that money deposited into Al-Aqsa accounts in Europe and in the Middle East could be accessed from Israel through Citibank chapters.

In January 2001 Citibank opened an office in Tel Aviv. Israeli authorities then formally questioned its cooperation with Al-Aqsa Islamic Bank and urged Citigroup to request advice from the U.S. Treasury Department. Citigroup has not released any information on the Treasury Department's response; however, the bank has severed its ties to Al-Aqsa.

At that point, however, Al-Aqsa bank had received funds for at least $1 million through Citibank on behalf of Hamas.

== See also ==
- Economy of Palestine
- Islamic banking and finance
- Taxation in the State of Palestine
- United States government sanctions
