= PFLP-GC Headquarters Raid (1988) =

Part of the 1985–2000 South Lebanon conflict

- Part of the South Lebanon conflict (1985–2000)
Date	8–9 December 1988
Location	Naameh, Lebanon
Result	PFLP-GC victory

Belligerents
Israel	Popular Front for the Liberation of Palestine – General Command

Commanders and leaders
(Israel) Gen. Doron Rubin	(Popular Front for the Liberation of Palestine – General Command) Ahmad Jibril

Casualties and losses
(Israel) 1 killed (Israel) 3 wounded	(Popular Front for the Liberation of Palestine – General Command) 8–20 killed

The PFLP-GC Headquarters Raid was an Israeli commando operation against the Lebanese headquarters of the Popular Front for the Liberation of Palestine – General Command (PFLP-GC) in Naameh, 10 km (6.2 mi) south of Beirut, launched on 9 December 1988.

The operation was named Operation Blue and Brown (Hebrew: מבצע כחול וחום, romanized: Mivtza Kachol ve-Chum) and consisted of a night-time coastal landing and a difficult 3-kilometre (1.9 mi) march across very rough terrain to the heavily fortified Palestinian base, located near the coastal Lebanese town of Naameh (Arabic: الناعمة, romanized: an-Na'imah). It was to be the deepest Israeli incursion since the beginning of the withdrawal from Lebanon in 1983. Its two main objectives were the assassination of PFLP-GC's Secretary-General Ahmad Jibril, reported to be present at the base, and the destruction of the system of bunkers, caves, and tunnels, which made it invulnerable to air attack.

The operation failed to achieve its main objectives, mainly due to inaccurate intelligence and several mistakes made by the Israeli commanders. The Israeli soldiers never managed to break into or destroy the main bunker where Jibril was thought to be hiding. The attack on the caves similarly stalled because of loss of element of surprise and subsequent stiff resistance. The IDF commander Lt. Col. Amir Mei-Tal was killed and three of his men were wounded. Dan Shomron, Chief of Staff of the Israel Defense Forces described it as a successful operation executed with a high level of professionalism, while Israeli military analyst Ronen Bergman described the operation as an "embarrassing flop".

== Background ==
PFLP-GC was a small radical Palestinian resistance organization, whose main source of strength was the backing of the Syrian state and its security services. The organization had acquired some reputation, or notoriety, for carrying out lethal military operations. PFLP-GC was suspected of the bombing of Swissair Flight 330 (1970), the Kiryat Shmona massacre (1974) and the Night of the Gliders (1987).

The Lebanese headquarters of the PFLP-GC were located in a mountainous area above the town of Naameh. It consisted of several deep caves dug out in the mountain side and a central bunker. The caves contained the living quarters and garrison of the Sabra and Shatila battalion of the PFLP-GC. The bunker contained the headquarters as well as offices of Jibril and other high-ranking officials of the organization. The facilities had repeatedly been subjected to, and proven impenetrable to, severe aerial bombardment from the Israeli air force. Six months prior to the operation, PLO military commander Khalil al-Wazir had been assassinated in an Israeli raid in Tunis. A PFLP-GC cross-border hang-glider attack, that killed six Israeli soldiers, had deeply embarrassed the Israeli Army command. Israeli Deputy Chief of Staff Major General Ehud Barak vowed that Jibril's organization "will in due time pay the price" for its murderous mission. Although denied by Israel, the timing of the operation seems to have coincided with the anniversary of this attack and the outbreak of the intifada. The Israeli Prime minister Yitzhak Shamir "signed a Red Page" for Ahmad Jibril, meaning that he authorized his assassination.

== The Operation ==
Gen. Doron Rubin commanded the operation from an IDF vessel in the Mediterranean. Col. Baruch Spiegel was the commander on the ground at the beachhead.

The Israeli forces arrived in small boats. First a beachhead was secured by a unit of Shayetet 13 naval commandos under the command of Lt. Col. Eli Glickman. The main force, consisting of different units of the Golani Brigade was landed shortly afterwards. Lt. Col. Erez Gerstein, commander of the Golani commando unit, was to lead the attack on the main bunker, while Lt. Col. Amir Mei-Tal of the Golani 12th Battalion, was to lead the attack on the caves. The three-kilometre walk to the target proved much more difficult than anticipated. The area was covered by large boulders, making the walk both slow and hazardous.

The Israeli force only arrived at the Naameh base in 2am, which was much later than planned. Only a few hours remained before daybreak. A daytime withdrawal over hostile territory would be extremely dangerous. Gerstein asked Spiegel to abort the attack or allow the force to go into hiding and carry out the attack the following night. Spiegel denied both requests.

Gerstein and his men arrived at their target before the other units had reached theirs. Gerstein suddenly saw a figure in a window and decided to open fire with a gun with a silencer. The shots were probably overheard by the Palestinians and the element of surprise was lost.

Due to faulty intelligence, Gerstein's men could not locate the air vents of the bunker, where they were supposed to throw teargas grenades, to force the occupants to evacuate. Attempts to blow open the steel doors also failed. Repeated rounds of point-blank RPG grenades and Law 80 mm missiles resulted only in negligible damage. The Israelis were unable to force open the doors or to make the occupants evacuate the bunker. That part of the mission had to be given up.

Gerstein's premature opening of fire would have disastrous consequences for the other units, who had to run gauntlet under a hail of fire to their target. When Mei-Tal's force finally arrived at the caves, the Palestinian defenders were organized and ready. The Israeli forces were met with tremendous fire when trying to enter the first cave. Mei-Tal was hit in the head and chest and died soon after. Three soldiers were severely wounded and several more lightly wounded.

The Oketz Unit, the IDF canine special force, had prepared up to a dozen specially trained Doberman Pinschers, fitted with backpacks filled with explosives. The dogs had been trained to enter the caves, whereafter the explosives were to be ignited by remote control. It is unclear how many of the originally a dozen dogs actually were deployed in the battle. Some of them were apparently killed by the Palestinian fire and some ran shell-shocked back to their Israeli owners. There are no indications that any of the dogs caused any damage.

After the death of Mei-Tal, the Israeli force ceased attacking the tunnels, and concentrated their efforts on rescuing the wounded. Mei-Tal's deputy had previously strained his leg in the march and had been withdrawn from the operation. For a long time, no one took over command over the unit.

When Gerstein heard that Mei-Tal was killed, he ordered a general retreat. Back at the beachhead, it was discovered that a squad of four soldiers from Mei-Tal's unit had been left behind. The four were separated from the others because they did not hear the retreat order. As they waited in a ravine for a rescue, they encountered a PFLP squad and killed them. While the search for the missing continued, the main force was evacuated from the beach-head. After seven hours the four stranded soldiers were eventually rescued in a dramatic helicopter operation. Unable to land due to heavy Palestinian fire, the four Israeli soldiers had to grab the landing gear of the helicopter.

== Aftermath ==
Israel claimed to have killed 20 Palestinian fighters in the battle. Later Israeli accounts increased this number to 30 killed. According to Palestinian sources only eight Palestinian fighters died in the battle. Among those killed was Abu Jamil, the commander of the Sabra and Shatila battalion. Israeli sources do not agree on when or where Abu Jamil was killed.

Ronen Bergman claims that Jibril was not present at the base during the attack. American intelligence information, however, claims that he remained inside the main bunker during the whole battle. Apparently, Ahmad Jibril held a press conference in his bunker, while the IDF was still searching for the missing soldiers. He presented a lot of captured Israeli military equipment left on the battlefield. Jibril was pictured holding Mei-Tal's personal Galil rifle, which was fitted with a silencer, specially developed for the operation, which Israel had preferred not to end up in enemy hands. The picture of Jibril holding the gun of Mei-Tal is on the cover of Katz book on PFLP-GC.

The operation was generally considered a failure in Israel and Gen. Rubin was blamed for the many mistakes. One of the mistakes was the inclusion of soldiers from many different units of the Golani Brigade. Some people believe that Ehud Barak, when he became IDF Chief of Staff, fired Rubin from the IDF, because of this incident.

US Secretary of State George P. Shultz commented on the Israeli raid. "I would have thought that, by this time, the Israelis would have learned their lesson about putting troops well inside of Lebanon," he said. "It didn't work before, and I am surprised."

== Bibliography ==
Blanford, Nicholas, Warriors of God, Inside Hezbollah’s Thirty-Year Struggle Against Israel, New York, 2011

Katz, Samuel M., Israel versus Jibril – The Thirty-Year War Against a Master Terrorist, Paragon House, New York, 1993

Bergman, Ronen, RISE AND KILL FIRST, The secret history of Israel's targeted assassinations, Random house, New York, 2018

== Bibliography ==
- Bergman, Ronen (2018b). Rise and Kill First: The Secret History of Israel's Targeted Assassinations. Random House. ISBN 978-1-400-06971-2.
