= 1985 West Bank land fraud case =

The 1985 West Bank land fraud case was a scandal involving fraudulent sales of land in the Israeli-occupied West Bank. The case emerged during a period of expanding Israeli settlement activity, that started in 1967. It led to political controversy and legal investigations within the occupied territories. The fraud utilized the legal ambiguities surrounding land ownership and property transactions in the occupied territories. Broader tensions that revolved around the land ownership regarded the ambiguity of property transactions when in a situation of occupation. This led to legal insecurity.

== Background ==
=== 1967 and the Israeli occupation of the West Bank ===
Israel's victory in the 1967 Arab-Israeli War meant a rapid occupation of the West Bank and the Gaza Strip, as well as a variety of other territories, like the Sinai Peninsula, that was later given back to Egypt, or the Golan Heights. In the aftermath of their successes, Israeli authorities were forced to develop new governance structures and research programs. One of which was the regulation of land administration under military occupation law.

Following military occupational law, it entailed that the occupying power, in this case Israel, does not become the legal owner of the land. The Israeli government did not yet assert sovereignty over the territory. It also implies private property is protected in these areas. Therefore, it was illegal for Israeli individuals to privately purchase land in the occupied territories. Specifically in the West Bank, the military law took form through Israeli military others together with Jordanian law.

=== Likud government (post-1977) ===
In 1977 the Likud government, led by Menachem Begin, won the election. After three decades of dominance by the Labour Party, the government became more right-wing and nationalistic. Support increased for Israeli presence and settlement activity in the occupied territories.

As part of the settlement expansion, the Likud government decriminalised Israeli private purchases in the occupied territories, in the goal of increasing the number of Israeli settlers. Israeli civilians were no longer prosecuted under Israeli law for attempting to buy land in the territories. Still, the territory was not annexed and law and property rules were still shaped by both Jordanian and Israeli law.

=== Situation in 1985 ===
By 1985, Israel was governed by a coalition between the Likud and the Labour Party. The population of Israeli settlers in the occupied Palestinian West Bank had grown to 40 000. In 1985, the Israeli Police and supporting institutions investigated financial fraud in the West Bank. However, the investigation escalated when they found out government officials were involved in bribery and misuse of land purchasing. The officials, with a nationalistic background, that were involved used coercion towards local Israelis to make them believe they were buying land that had been cleared by the government for settlement. This was not the case. Officials mentioned were Avi Tzur and Claude Malka, both aides to the deputy minister of Agriculture. The nationalist party Herut became a part of Likud in 1973, and were involved in this fraudulent settlement land acquisition system.

The motive for the fraud lies mainly in the securing of land approvals to profit financially from the land transactions. The Arab land dealers, for example Ahmad 'Awdah "sold" their land to Israelis, making profit through commissions. Although, the dealers were not necessarily owners, but included middlemen and brokers. The officials would receive money through bribes in exchange for facilitating approvals or issuing documents that made the transactions appear legitimate, made possible by unclear ownership rules.

== Events ==
=== Investigation and fraud methods ===
In 1983, the State Comptroller of Israel compiled a report on sales of Palestinian land to Israelis in the occupied West Bank, finding that the majority of those sales had been fraudulent. According to the report, the sales had been realised using a combination of forged documentation, coercion, bribes to Israeli officials, and arson of Palestinian land registration archives. Many of the buyers of the land, in turn, had been ordinary Israelis, who had been led to believe that the land they were buying had been officially cleared for settlement by the government. A number of Israelis were implicated in the report, including senior government officials and real estate companies, while the key Palestinian figure implicated in the report was 37-year-old Ahmed Odeh, a former teacher who had become a land broker willing to work with Israelis and who had built personal ties with several senior Likud officials.

=== Political reactions ===
The State Comptroller's report was published publicly in August 1985 and immediately ignited controversy. Centre-left newspaper Haaretz published an editorial describing the case as "another, almost inevitable aspect of the moral decline that has set in as a result of the continued rule in the territories... One can now sense the rot that has been festering here for years." Likud leader and Minister of Foreign Affairs Yitzhak Shamir, on the other hand, argued that it was "intolerable that the investigation of isolated cases of land purchases should turn into a general witch hunt on all the land purchases in Judea and Samaria, with the aim of preventing this Zionist mission," adding that "the police, even when it investigates criminal acts, must consider the national interest. Criminal suspicions must be investigated, but no policeman or officer must be influenced by those defeatists who want to harm settlement."

Ministry of Justice official Pliah Albeck stated that "out of land offered for sale by Arabs to Jews, more than 90% are attempts at fraud--people trying to sell land that does not belong to them." Political scientist and former Deputy Mayor of Jerusalem Meron Benvenisti stated that there were at least ten cases of Palestinians being killed since 1979 in connection with land fraud. Kassem Yusuf, a 57-year-old Palestinian from Biddya, described the impact the case had on him to United Press International, claiming that a group of Israelis in bulldozers, along with Odeh and an Israeli military escort, arrived at Biddya one day and told him and several of his neighbours that their lands had been sold for a below-market price. When the neighbours protested and tried to stop the bulldozers, Yusuf claimed, the military opened fire, killing one of them and arresting the others. The Chicago Tribune described a case represented by Palestinian lawyer Nidal Taha: "in one instance Israeli brokers posing as soldiers broke the thumb of one of his clients when they tried to force him to sign a fraudulent land sale agreement with his thumbprint. Such signatures are legally acceptable."

=== Arrests and aftermath ===
In October 1985, Palestinian journalist Hassan Abdul Halim Fakih, an Al Fajr correspondent who had been covering the case, was reported missing. His body was found near the highway between Ramallah and Latrun in late December 1985. The cause of death was not immediately clear, with initial police reports and the newspaper indicating that he had been murdered, but with news agency ITIM indicating that he had accidentally killed himself while preparing a bomb for a terrorist group.

In early December 1985, two Israeli officials were arrested in connection with the case. The officials, Avi Tsur and Claude Malka, were accused of having accepted tens of millions of Israeli new shekels in bribes and of falsifying government documents when they had worked at the Ministry of Agriculture. The falsified documents were used to mislead buyers into believing that they were purchasing Palestinian land that had been approved for Israeli settlement, with some of the bribe money also being funnelled towards Likud pro-settlement lobbying groups. The arrests further sparked controversy in Israeli politics, with Likud politicians arguing that the arrests were politically motivated. Deputy Minister of Foreign Affairs and Likud MK Roni Milo claimed that there was "a total disproportion in the importance given to this so-called land scandal," while Shamir described the case as "exaggerated." In the following days, Likud MK Michael Dekel, who had been appointed Deputy Minister of Defence at the beginning of the months and who had previously served as Minister of Agriculture, was summoned by the Israeli police for questioning.

On 13 January 1986, 17 Palestinians were arrested in connection with the case. Among the seventeen were three police officers, two mukhtars, one court clerk, one notary public, and several land brokers.

In June 1986, Israeli real estate developer Avraham Gindi committed suicide via self-immolation. Gindi had been charged in connection with the case, with his company having made millions of dollars by selling land it did not own to several hundred Israelis. His brothers, Moshe and Yigal, had fled Israel to Brazil to evade warrants against them.
