= Haret en Naameh =

Town in Chouf District, Mount Lebanon Governate, Lebanon

Haret en Naameh حارة الناعمة Na'ameh
- Town
- Location within Lebanon
- Coordinates: 33°44′56″N 35°27′14″E
- Country: Lebanon
- Governorate: Mount Lebanon
- District: Chouf
- Elevation: 100 m (330 ft)

Population
  - Total: 90,000
- Time zone: UTC+2 (EET)
  - Summer (DST): UTC+3 (EEST)

Haret en Naameh (Arabic: حارة الناعمة), or simply Na'ameh (Arabic: الناعمة), is a Lebanese coastal town located in the Chouf District, an administrative division of the Mount Lebanon Governorate.

== History ==
On 9 December 1988, Israeli commandos attacked Haret en Naameh hills, with the Israeli leader of the operation being killed. On 10 January 1992, an Israeli air strike above Haret en Naameh killed three members of the Palestinian militia PFLP-GC. The attack also destroyed an encampment of the nomadic gypsies, killing seven women and two children. Another Israeli airstrike, on 15 January 1995, killed three people and caused several other casualties.

On 25 January 2010, Ethiopian Airlines Flight 409 crashed into the Mediterranean Sea off the coast of Na'ameh.

== Notable people ==
Notable families include Mezher (مزهر), Matar (مطر), Fakhreddine (فخر الدين), Chahin (شاهين), El-Khouri (الخوري), Atwi (عطوي), Hammoud (حمود), Yazbek (يزبك), Eid (عيد).

== See also ==
- PFLP-GC Headquarters Raid (1988)
