= Gaza Now =

Palestinian news agency in Gaza

Gaza Now News Network
- Arabic: غزة الآن
- Formation: 2006
- Founder: Mustafa Ayyash
- Type: News agency
- Headquarters: Gaza City, Gaza, Palestine
- Region served: Worldwide
- Products: Wire service, News, Photos, Video
- Official language: Arabic, English
- Website: gazaalan.net

Gaza Now News Network is a Hamas-aligned Palestinian news agency based in Gaza. Its Telegram channel, Facebook page, and television station are among the most popular in Gaza, rapidly growing in popularity during the Gaza war.

In 2024, the United States and United Kingdom imposed sanctioned on Gaza Now and its founder Mustafa Ayyash for allegedly fundraising in support of Hamas.

In 2026, the European Union sanctioned Gaza Now and its founder for allegedly raising funds for Hamas.

== History ==
The Gaza Now television channel was established in 2006 and is broadcast on Nilesat. It provides entertainment and news regarding Gaza. The satellite channel broadcast the events of Gaza war throughout the day without stopping. The channel broadcasts daily events taking place throughout the State of Palestine with a variety of news, political, cultural and sports programs.

On 24 May 2017, a reporter for Gaza Now livestreamed on Facebook an execution in Gaza City by Hamas of three Palestinians who Hamas accused as helping Israel find Hamas military commander Mazen Faqha. The Hamas interior ministry warned against publishing any footage or photos from the execution. Gaza Now responded by saying that they hadn't received any decision from the Interior Ministry or from the Media Office in Gaza to prevent the filming of the execution. Human Rights Watch condemned the executions. Ayyash, living in Austria in 2017, said that the reporter who captured the video subsequently went into hiding in Gaza for fear of arrest by Hamas security forces.

Activists accused Facebook in 2021 of adding a "discouraging" pop-up when Gaza Now's page was viewed, leading to accusations of bias.

Twitter removed Gaza Now's account after the outlet praised the 2022 El'ad stabbing, in which four Israeli civilians were murdered.

The telegram channel of Gaza Now was hacked on 9 December 2022. The hackers deleted all contents from the channel. Palestinians on social media blamed Israeli hackers on the incident.

== Gaza war ==
Gaza Now's Telegram channel was one of several Hamas-affiliated channels to rapidly grow during the Gaza war, helping Hamas wage "video jihad", according to the Washington Post and the Digital Forensic Lab at the Atlantic Council. Before the war, the channel had 344,000 users. By early November, it had 1.9 million subscribers. Its average views per post increased ten-fold to 432,000 during the same time period.

On 13 October 2023, six days into the Gaza war, Gaza Now quietly made the decision to disable emoji reactions and retroactively remove them from all previous posts. The motive behind this remains unclear.

In late October, Telegram "quietly restricted access" to Gaza Now's Telegram channel as part of a move against several Hamas-affiliated channels. The channel was not accessible Google Play or Apple’s App Store. The channel was still accessible from the online version of Telegram and the version of the app downloaded directly from Telegram’s website. Before that, Gaza Now announced that, unlike other social media platforms, Telegram refused to take down Palestinian channels disseminating content related to the ongoing conflict.

Family members of Mustafa Ayyash, the founder and director of Gaza Now, as well as Gaza Now's photojournalist Mohammad Moin Ayyash, were killed in an Israeli airstrikes on 23 November 2023 ahead of temporary ceasefire. The Permanent Observer of Palestine at the United Nations Salah Abdel-Shafi and Chairman of Hamas Political Bureau Ismail Haniyeh mourned the death of his family.

On 27 March 2024, the United States and the United Kingdom sanctioned Gaza Now, its founder Ayyash, and firms Al-Qureshi Executives and Aakhirah Ltd. and their director Aozma Sultana, for allegedly fundraising for Hamas.

On 16 November 2026, the European Union imposed terrorism sanction on Gaza Now and its founder for allegedly soliciting funds for Hamas.

== See also ==
- History of Palestinian journalism
