= 1990 Temple Mount killings =

Riots and killings of Palestinians in Jerusalem during the First Intifada

Coordinates: 31°46′34.45″N 35°14′8.08″E

- Location: Al-Aqsa, Temple Mount, Jerusalem
- Date: October 8, 1990; 36 years ago
- Attack type: Massacre, mass shooting
- Deaths: 17
- Injuries: 170+ (150+ Palestinians, 20+ Israelis)
- Perpetrator: Israel Border Police

The 1990 Temple Mount killings, or the Al Aqsa Massacre, also known as Black Monday, took place in the Al-Aqsa compound on the Temple Mount, Jerusalem at 10:30 am on Monday, October 8, 1990, before Zuhr prayer during the third year of the First Intifada. Following a decision by the Temple Mount Faithful to lay the cornerstone for the Temple, mass riots erupted, In the ensuing clashes, 17 Palestinians died, (Note: "All accounts originally reported anywhere between 19 and 21 deaths. At a 15 October press conference, however, the Jerusalem-based Palestine Human Rights Information Center (PHRIC) lowered the death count to 17, and other organizations and reports followed. Of the deaths initially reported, one had died of a heart attack, two thought to have died were only injured and survived, and one had been shot by an Israeli civilian in another section of Jerusalem (and later died)") more than 150 Palestinians were wounded by Israeli security forces, and more than 20 Israeli civilians and police were wounded by Palestinians. United Nations Security Council Resolution 672, which was rejected by Israel, "condemned especially the acts of violence committed by the Israeli security forces" and United Nations Security Council Resolution 673 urged that Israel reconsider its refusal to allow United Nations Secretary-General Javier Pérez de Cuéllar to carry out an investigation.

== Background ==
The Temple Mount is the holiest place on earth for Jews, a place where God manifested, and where the First and Second Temple stood until they were destroyed. Moreover, the temple mount is the beginning and the end of the world in Jewish mystical belief. Muslims also view the site as holy and are apprehensive regarding a possible Jewish takeover. The location is currently known as Al-Aqsa and the central structure is a 7th century mosque. It is believed by Muslims to be the place where prophet Muhammad ascended to heaven. The site has been a recurring flashpoint.

During the 1989 Sukkot festival, the Temple Mount Faithful first attempted to march with a foundation stone to the mount. Prevented by police, this still provoked a violent reaction from Muslim worshipers who hurled stones at Jewish worshipers at the Western Wall below.

During 1990, the Muslim waqf erected pulpits and gardens in previously empty locations on the mount in order to head off a presumed Jewish encroachment. The Temple Mount Faithful appealed to the Israeli high court so that the antiquities law would be enforced so that ancient artifacts would not be destroyed.

Due to the violent events of 1989, police placed strict restrictions on the planned 1990 Sukkot march with the foundation stone announcing in Jewish and Arab media that the Temple Mount Faithful would not be allowed near the mount. The faithful said they would march towards the mount nonetheless, and erect a Sukkah. Muslim authorities called on Muslim believers to stop the march with their bodies, and on October 7 masked men went door to door in an Arab neighborhood demanding that residents participate. Palestinian media and Hamas publicized the issue.

== Events ==
According to Anthony Lewis:

Palestinians on the Temple Mount began throwing stones at Jews worshiping, on a religious holiday, at the Western Wall below. The only security forces present, 40 men from the paramilitary Israeli Border Police, used live ammunition on the Palestinians. They killed at least 21. There were no Israeli deaths. The Israeli Government claimed that the Palestinians brought the stones with them and staged the incident as a political provocation. The Temple Mount is a paved plain that usually has few if any stones. But at this time construction work did provide material for missiles. Zeev Schiff, the respected defense correspondent of the newspaper Haaretz, said the Palestinians began throwing stones only after mosques in the nearby village of Silwan announced through loudspeakers that Jewish extremists had come there. The extremists were from the Temple Mount Faithful, who proposed to rebuild Solomon's Temple where the Al-Aqsa mosque now stands.

== International response ==
On October 10, The United States proposed a resolution, supported by the United Nations Secretary-General, Javier Pérez de Cuéllar, to investigate the al-Aqsa incident and to report back to the Security Council promptly. which was by far the most critical of Israel introduced by the United States. The UN issued the following resolution on October 12, 1990, referencing the event:

Res. 672 (Oct. 12, 1990) – "Expresses alarm at the violence which took place" on October 8, 1990, "at the Al Haram al Shareef and other Holy Places of Jerusalem resulting in over twenty Palestinian deaths and to the injury of more than one hundred and fifty people, including Palestinian civilians and innocent worshippers", "Condemns especially the acts of violence committed by the Israeli forces resulting in injuries and loss of human life", and "Requests, in connection with the decision of the Secretary-General to send a mission to the region, which the Council welcomes, that he submit a report to it before the end of October 1990 containing his findings and conclusions and that he use as appropriate all the resources of the United Nations in the region in carrying out the mission."

Israel ended up rejecting the resolution, saying it did not pay attention to attacks by rocks on Jewish worshippers at the Western Wall. In turn, the UN Security Council unanimously backed UN Security Council Resolution 673 on October 24, 1990, condemning Israeli rejection of the UN fact finding mission.

Deplores the refusal of the Israeli Government to receive the mission of the Secretary-General to the region", and "Urges the Israeli Government to reconsider its decision and insists that it comply fully with resolution 672 (1990) and to permit the mission of the Secretary-General to proceed in keeping with its purpose.

Failing to get agreement from Israel, the Secretary-General Javier Pérez de Cuéllar on October 31 published his report. In the report, he stated:

The Secretary-General has thus been unable to secure independent information on the spot, about the circumstances surrounding the recent events in Jerusalem and similar developments in the West Bank and Gaza Strip. Widespread coverage has, however, been given by the international press to the clashes that occurred at Al-Haram Al-Shareef and other Holy Places of Jerusalem on 8 October 1990. According to reports, which vary, some 17 to 21 Palestinians were killed and more than 150 wounded by Israeli security forces, and more than 20 Israeli civilians and police were wounded by Palestinians. While there are conflicting opinions as to what provoked the clashes, observers on the spot, including personnel of the International Committee of the Red Cross (ICRC), stated that live ammunition was used against Palestinian civilians. Attention is drawn, in this connection, to the fact that a number of inquiries have been conducted. Apart from the [Israeli] Commission of Investigation referred to in paragraphs 3, 4 and 7 above, several Israeli and Palestinian human rights organizations have conducted inquiries of their own. The findings of two of them, B'Tselem and Al-Haq, were communicated to the Secretary-General, on 14 October and 28 October 1990, respectively, and are being issued separately as addenda to the present report.

Following the report, United Nations Security Council Resolution 681 on December 20, 1990, referring to Resolutions 672 and 673, called on Israel to apply the Fourth Geneva Convention to Palestinians in the occupied territories.

In their Annual 1990 World Report Human Rights Watch condemned the Israeli report on the incident as "only mentioning in passing the 'uncontrolled use of live ammunition' by police, giving scant attention to what should have been a central issue: the use of excessive force, including shooting into a crowd with bursts of automatic-weapon fire."

== Israeli response ==
The Israeli Government claimed that the Palestinians brought the stones with them and staged the incident as a political provocation. The Temple Mount is a paved plain that usually has few if any stones. But at this time construction work did provide some stones.

Israel rejected the UN resolution condemning the incident and calling for investigation, saying the resolution disregarded attacks on Jewish worshippers at the Western Wall, and that it was an interference in its internal affairs. Israel refused entry to the mission, with Resolution 673 urging Israel to reconsider its decision.

On October 26, 1990, Israel issued a report concerning the violence and concluded that Israel police acted with prudence once it came under attack citing fear for the safety of policemen on Temple Mount. The report also had some criticism of the police for not assessing properly the situation and not being prepared with a larger force to deal with any eventuality.

According to the Israeli "Report of the Commission of Inquiry into the Events on Temple Mount on 8 October 1990":

The members of the Wakf knew that the High Court had refused the Temple Mount Faithful petition to lay the cornerstone of the Third Temple, and did not respond to requests by Israel Police officers on the morning of the incident to calm the crowd. This, even after the police informed the Wakf that they would also prevent the Temple Mount Faithful, and anyone else, from visiting the area, though such visits are allowed by law.

== Palestinian response ==
Palestinians claimed they threw missiles only after the police fired at them while the police claimed it was the other way around. The Higher Islamic Council commissioned a report on the events and submitted it to the United Nations on October 28, 1990. In the report the Palestinians claimed "Moslems threw stones at the soldiers only after they were shot at with live ammunition and tear gas, and then only to defend themselves and to stop the soldiers. Moslems did not in any way assault holy places and worshipers from other religions, an act which would be against the very essence of their religion."

== See also ==
- Arab–Israeli conflict
- Israeli–Palestinian conflict
- Western Wall Tunnel riots

== Sources ==
- Report (1991). "The Haram Al-Sharif (Temple Mount) Killings". Journal of Palestine Studies. 20 (2): 134–159. doi:10.1080/07329113.2017.1388100. JSTOR 2537210. S2CID 220316137.
