= ITIM (news agency) =

Israeli news agency

ITIM was a news agency established in 1950 in Tel Aviv, Israel.

== History ==
ITIM was founded in 1950 by journalist Haim Baltsan and the seven main Israeli newspapers of the time, who each held an equal stake in the agency. The agency went into receivership in November 2003 and nearly ceased operations due to massive debts. The agency was closed in 2006.
