= United Nations Security Council Resolution 673 =

UN Security Council Resolution 673
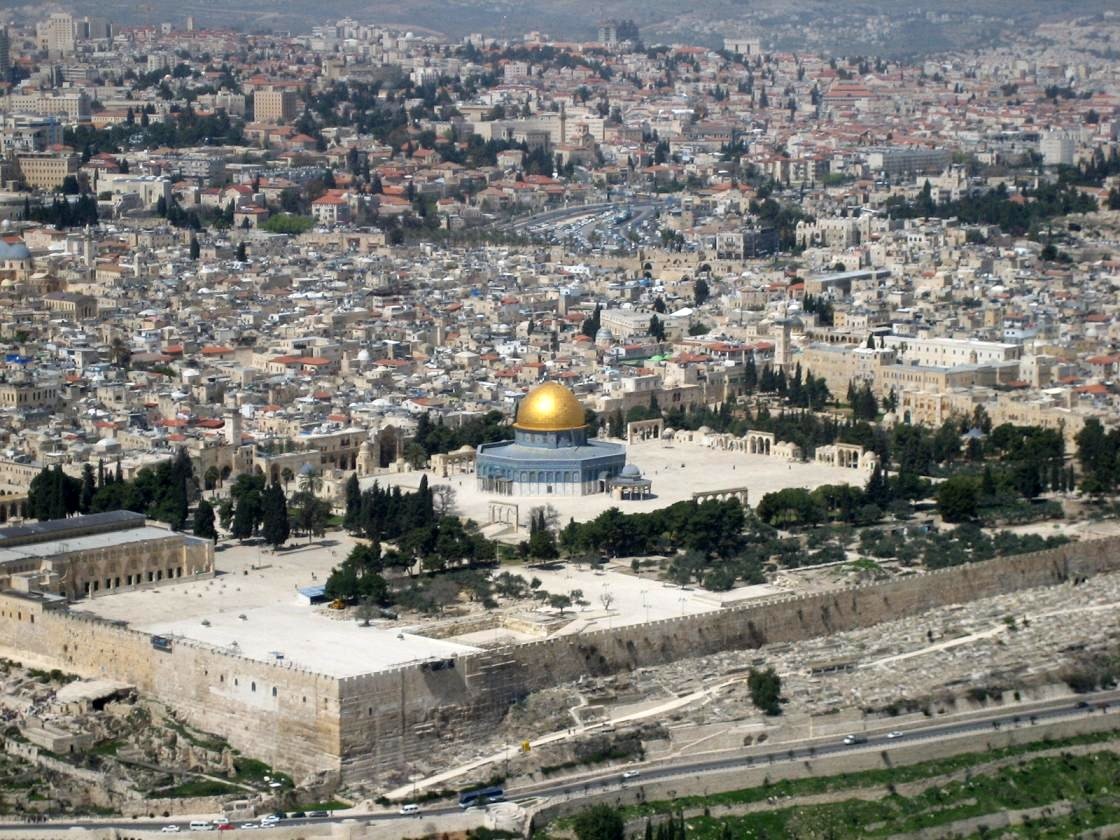
- Temple Mount
- Date: 24 October 1990
- Meeting no.: 2,949
- Code: S/RES/673 (Document)
- Subject: Territories occupied by Israel
- Voting summary: 15 voted for; None voted against; None abstained
- Result: Adopted

Security Council composition
- Permanent members: China; France; Soviet Union; United Kingdom; United States
- Non-permanent members: Canada; Colombia; Côte d'Ivoire; Cuba; Ethiopia; Finland; Malaysia; Romania; Yemen; Zaire

United Nations Security Council resolution 673, adopted unanimously on 24 October 1990, after reaffirming Resolution 672 (1990), the Council deplored Israel's refusal to receive the mission of the Secretary-General to the region.

Members of the mission, authorised under Resolution 672 (1990) to visit the Temple Mount region, were prevented from visiting the area after Israel said it was an interference in its internal affairs. The Secretary-General Javier Pérez de Cuéllar later decided to publish his report without dispatching the mission, which was reviewed in Resolution 681.

The Council urged Israel to reconsider its decision and allow the mission to visit the area of the riots at Temple Mount which resulted in loss of lives and damage to property.

Resolution 673 was submitted at the meeting by Colombia, Cuba, Malaysia and Yemen, which consisted of a heated debate and which Sudan, supported by several non-aligned countries, called for strong measures against Israel, including under Chapter VII of the United Nations Charter. Israel rejected this, arguing Resolution 272 (1967) and the situation relating to the Palestinians was not comparable to that of the invasion of Kuwait by Iraq.

== See also ==
- Arab–Israeli conflict
- First Intifada
- Israeli–Palestinian conflict
- List of United Nations Security Council Resolutions 601 to 700 (1987–1991)
