= Palestinian-Jordanian Joint Action Agreement =

The Palestinian-Jordanian Joint Action Agreement was an agreement signed between the Palestine Liberation Organisation and the Jordanian government in 1985. The agreement collapsed in early 1986.

== History ==
=== Signing ===
On 11 February 1985, PLO chairman Yasser Arafat and King Hussein of Jordan signed the agreement.

=== Implementation and diplomacy ===
In August 1985, Assistant Secretary of State for Near Eastern and South Asian Affairs Richard W. Murphy made an official visit to the Middle East, visiting Israel, Jordan, and Egypt. The visit was received negatively by the PLO, who accused Murphy of having broken a promise to meet with a joint Palestinian-Jordanian delegation during the visit.

In November 1985, Arafat met with Egyptian President Hosni Mubarak in Cairo. Following the meeting, Arafat gave a declaration on terrorism in which he stated that the PLO "denounces and condemns all terrorist acts" and pledged to punish PLO members who violated the declaration, but that the PLO would still retain the right "to fight against the Israeli occupation in all possible ways." Hussein stated that the Cairo Declaration did not go far enough in renouncing terrorism.

=== Collapse ===
On 19 February 1986, Hussein gave a televised speech in which he declared that the Agreement had failed. In his speech, which lasted over three hours, Hussein blamed Arafat for the Agreement's collapse, accusing the PLO of breaking their promise to recognise United Nations Security Council Resolution 242 and United Nations Security Council Resolution 338.

The collapse of the Agreement was largely received negatively by Palestinians, who blamed Hussein. On 2 March, Mayor of Nablus Zafer al-Masri, who had recently been appointed by the Israeli government and was widely considered to be a moderate, was assassinated by a hardline Palestinian faction. His funeral developed into one of the largest political demonstrations in the West Bank since the start of the Israeli occupation, with tens of thousands of Palestinians marching in support of Palestinian nationalism and condemning Hussein and Assad.

The Israeli government welcomed the collapse of the Agreement. Israeli Prime Minister Shimon Peres congratulated Hussein for "exposing the truth about the PLO," saying to Palestinians that "to follow the PLO is to go nowhere and get nowhere. They’ll kill a few more people; a little more terrorism. But basically they’re killing their own future." Minister of Defence Yitzhak Rabin described it as "an opening to peace... If only five or six West Bank figures would rise up and take up the leadership call, realizing that the PLO has consistently foiled peace efforts, this would bring a breakthrough. What are they waiting for? A miracle? Here is a golden opportunity."

The collapse of the Agreement was also received positively by the Syrian government, who saw it as vindication for their more hardline stance on the Israeli-Palestinian conflict.

== Analysis ==
=== Factors influencing the Jordanian government's decision-making ===
According to John Kifner of The New York Times, by 1986, the Jordanian government had increasingly come to believe "that the Israelis are unlikely to ever give up the West Bank, but could instead put great pressure on the growing West Bank Palestinian population - now estimated at 850,000 - to move across the Jordan River, creating new economic and political burdens and endangering the kingdom."

== Aftermath ==
In July 1986, the Jordanian ordered all Fatah offices in the Kingdom of Jordan closed.
