= Temple Mount Faithful =

Jerusalem-based Orthodox Jewish movement

The Temple Mount and Israel Faithful Movement (Hebrew: נאמני הר הבית וארץ ישראל), more commonly known simply as the Temple Mount Faithful (נאמני הר הבית), is an Orthodox Jewish movement, based in Jerusalem, whose goal is to rebuild the Third Jewish Temple on the Temple Mount in Jerusalem and re-institute the practice of ritual sacrifice.

== History ==
The movement was founded by former Israel Defense Forces officer and Middle Eastern studies lecturer Gershon Salomon. Members of the movement are referred to as the "Temple Mount Faithful". The group was established in 1967.

On 8 October 1990, seventeen Palestinians were killed and over 100 others injured by Israeli Border Police in the 1990 Temple Mount riots triggered by an announcement by the Temple Mount Faithful that they were going to lay a cornerstone for a Third Jewish Temple on the Temple Mount in Jerusalem. After the riots, the police prohibited Salomon from entering the Temple Mount; his appeal of that decision was subsequently denied by Israel's High Court of Justice.

The Temple Mount Faithful was the first significant group to advocate the Jewish takeover of the Temple Mount, and during the 1970s and 1980s, it remained the most visible group with that position. Initially, the group presented its argument largely in terms of nationalistic, rather than religious, symbolism. In a 1983 interview, Salomon stated that "whoever controls the Temple Mount has rights over the Land of Israel". Over time, Gershon Salomon developed a more religiously oriented apocalyptic and messianic platform, which, however, was distinctly non-Orthodox in character. Tensions with the more Orthodox elements in the group caused a formal split in 1987, when a more religiously oriented splinter group, called the "Movement for the Establishment of the Temple", was founded. Subsequently, the influence of the Temple Mount Faithful among the radical Jewish activists gradually waned, although the group still retains significant visibility.

== Organization operations ==
The Temple Mount Faithful functions as a protest movement, but, unlike some other radical Jewish groups, it attempts to operate within Israeli law. Typically, shortly before major Jewish religious festivals, the group requests a permit from the Israeli police to enter the Temple Mount compound and conduct prayer services there. These requests are routinely denied, and are followed by petitions to Israel's High Court of Justice. The High Court, also routinely, permits the group to enter the site, but not to pray there; and such permit is contingent on the Israeli police concluding that the security situation would allow such entry. The police conclude that the entry cannot be permitted for security reasons, and the Temple Mount Faithful are not allowed to enter the Temple Mount compound. As a result, their demonstrations usually proceed to the Mograbi Gate, and are stopped by the police there, outside of the compound.

In recent years, Salomon increasingly shifted the focus of the Temple Mount Faithful in the apocalyptic and messianic direction, and restoration of the Jewish Temple became one of the central objectives of the movement. During the same period, the movement developed close ties with Christian fundamentalist circles, and it receives significant financial assistance from some Christian groups, particularly in the United States.

== Death of Gershon Salomon ==
On 23 November 2022, Gershon Salomon, founder of the Temple Mount Faithful, died. Although banned from the Temple Mount for many years, he was allowed to make one visit during the last year of his life.

== See also ==
- Committee for the Prevention of Destruction of Antiquities on the Temple Mount
- Temple Institute
- Oslo Accords
- Palestinian National Security Forces
