= Balfour Day =

Balfour Day is the name given to an annual commemoration of the 1917 Balfour Declaration, by Palestinians, Israelis and their supporters.

== Jewish celebration ==
From 1918 until World War II, Jews in Mandatory Palestine celebrated Balfour Day as an annual national holiday on 2 November. The celebrations included ceremonies in schools and other public institutions and festive articles in the Hebrew press.

== Palestinian mourning ==
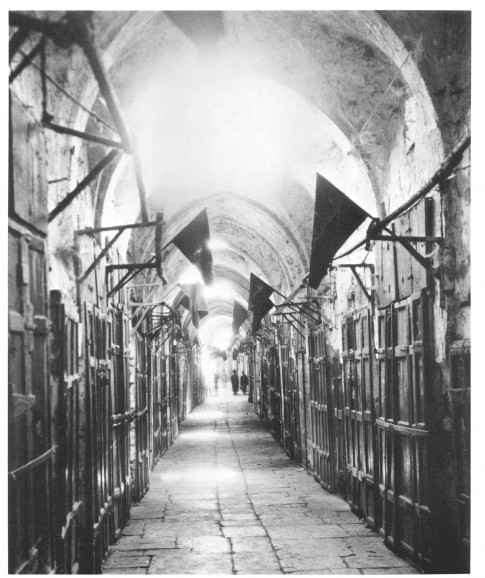
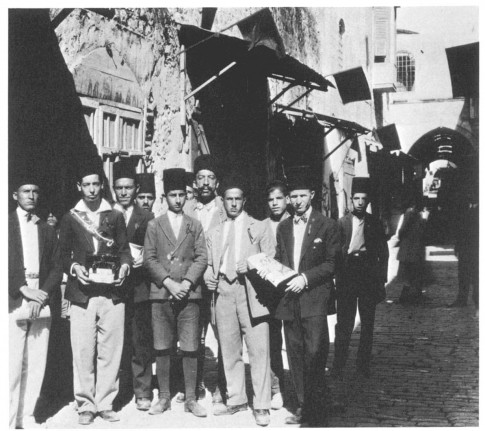
Palestinian mourning on Balfour Day 1929, Old City of Jerusalem

Palestinian Arabs began marking Balfour Day as a day of mourning across the country. This included a general strike, with shops were closed, newspapers printed with black borders, and black flags hung. The protests were often an occasion for Palestinian unity, since they had no religious significance.

The British government in Palestine did not support the Palestinian Arab strike, so the Arab Executive did not always announce it officially.

Strikes and protests also took place in other cities, such as Beirut, Damascus and Cairo.

Formal commemoration was limited during the 1936–39 Arab revolt in Palestine, when most Palestinian political structures stopped functioning.

The country-wide Balfour Day strike was formally restarted in 1945.

== Bibliography ==
- Elie Podeh, "The Golden Jubilee celebrations of the Balfour Declaration (1967) and Israel" [שונות בתוך מפגן של אחדות: חגיגות יובל הזהב להצהרת בלפור (1967) בישראל ] Israel, Volume 17 (2010), pp 90-59.
- Tamir Sorek, Calendars, Martyrs, and Palestinian Particularism under British Rule, Journal of Palestine Studies, Vol. 43, No. 1 (Autumn 2013), pp. 6-23
- Sorek, Tamir (6 May 2015). Palestinian Commemoration in Israel: Calendars, Monuments, and Martyrs. Stanford University Press. ISBN 978-0-8047-9520-3.
