= Palestine Human Rights Information Center =

Non-governmental organization in Jerusalem

- Formation: 1986
- Type: Non-governmental organization
- Purpose: Human rights advocacy
- Headquarters: Jerusalem, Palestine

The Palestine Human Rights Information Center (PHRIC) was an independent, non-governmental organization based in Jerusalem. PHRIC was established in 1986.

== See also ==
- Al-Haq
- B'Tselem
