= United Nations Security Council Resolution 672 =

United Nations Security Council resolution

UN Security Council Resolution 672
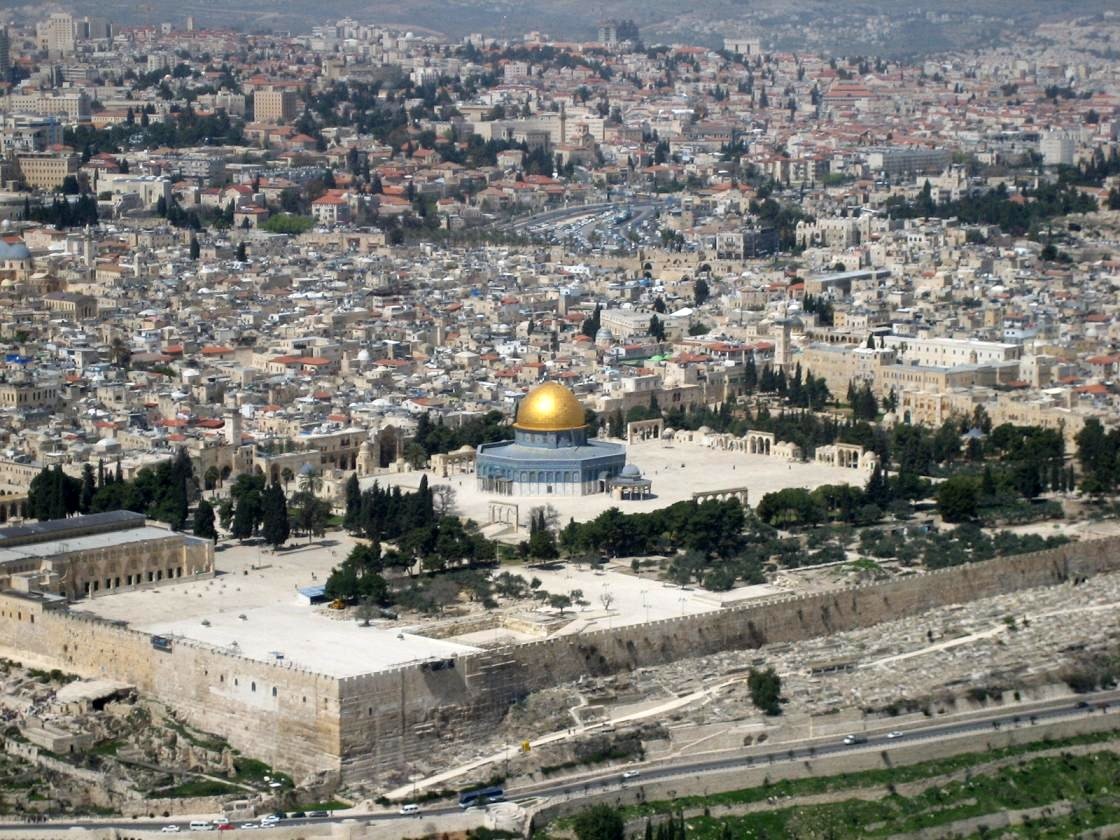
- Temple Mount
- Date: 12 October 1990
- Meeting no.: 2,948
- Code: S/RES/672 (Document)
- Subject: Territories occupied by Israel
- Voting summary: 15 voted for; None voted against; None abstained
- Result: Adopted

Security Council composition
- Permanent members: China; France; Soviet Union; United Kingdom; United States
- Non-permanent members: Canada; Colombia; Côte d'Ivoire; Cuba; Ethiopia; Finland; Malaysia; Romania; Yemen; Zaire

United Nations Security Council resolution 672, adopted unanimously on 12 October 1990, after reaffirming resolutions 476 (1980), 478 (1980), the Council expressed alarm at the 1990 Temple Mount riots in Jerusalem on 8 October 1990, resulting in the death of over 20 Palestinians and the injury of more than 150 people, including Palestinian civilians and worshippers.

The Council went on to condemn the actions of the Israeli security forces, calling on Israel to abide by its legal obligations under the Fourth Geneva Convention. Resolution 672 also authorised a mission to be sent to the region to investigate the incident, reporting back by the end of October 1990.

Israel rejected the resolution, saying it disregarded attacks on Jewish worshippers at the Western Wall.

== See also ==
- Arab–Israeli conflict
- First Intifada
- Israeli–Palestinian conflict
- List of United Nations Security Council Resolutions 601 to 700 (1987–1991)
- United Nations Security Council Resolution 673
- 1990 Temple Mount riots
