= September 2024 Al-Mawasi refugee camp attack =

Action in Israel-Hamas War

September 2024 al-Mawasi refugee camp attack
- Part of the Gaza war and genocide
- Location: Al-Mawasi, Khan Yunis, Gaza Strip
- Date: 10 September 2024
- Attack type: Airstrikes, massacre
- Weapons: Three 2,000-pound bombs, specifically SPICE bombs
- Deaths: 19-40+ Palestinians
- Injuries: 60+ Palestinians
- Perpetrator: Israel Defense Forces

On 10 September 2024, the Israeli military conducted airstrikes on a refugee camp it had designated as a humanitarian "safe zone" in Al-Mawasi near Khan Yunis in the Gaza Strip where displaced civilians had been sheltering during the Gaza war. Between 19 and 40 Palestinians were killed in the attack, over 60 others were injured, and several people were trapped under the rubble. The Palestinian Civil Defence described the attack as a massacre.

== Background ==
During the Gaza war, Palestinians were ordered by Israel to evacuate to humanitarian safe zones. In December 2023, the Israel Defense Forces had declared Al-Mawasi a humanitarian safe zone but had attacked it in May, June, and July 2024. Prior to the attack, almost 86% of the Gaza Strip had been placed under evacuation orders and more than 1.9 million Palestinians had been displaced.

== Airstrikes ==
The attacks on al-Mawasi took place in the middle of the night on 10 September between midnight and 1 am. According to eyewitnesses, Israeli warplanes hit al-Mawasi with at least five missiles, an overcrowded designated "safe zone" where tens of thousands of displaced Palestinians had sought refuge from Israeli attacks, resulting in three large craters in the sand as deep as 9 meters. Several refugee tents caught fire from the explosion. According to civil defense spokesman Mahmoud Basal, no warnings were given prior to the strikes, and the bombs destroyed 20 to 40 tents, causing "entire families" to disappear in the sand.

According to CNN, two weapons experts have indicated that the visual evidence from the Al-Mawasi attack suggests the use of 2,000-pound bombs. According to Al Jazeera's verification agency Sanad, Israel may have used US-made Mark 84 bombs against the displaced families.

Ambulance and civil defense teams reported that they were having difficulties retrieving the bodies of the deceased Palestinians. Footage of the strike's aftermath show civilians digging in the sand with their hands to search for survivors. Several local Palestinians complained that "there is no safe place in Gaza" and that "we complied with the orders to evacuate, and this happened to us".

== Reactions ==
=== International actors ===
- Hamas denied that it stationed fighters in al-Mawasi, and labeled the Israeli accusations as lies to justify its "ugly crimes".
- Israel claimed that the attack targeted "significant Hamas terrorists" who were operating a "command-and-control center", and asserted that "numerous steps were taken to mitigate the risk of harming civilians, including the use of precise munitions, aerial surveillance, and additional means".
- United Nations Secretary General Antonio Guterres condemned the strike, whose spokesperson Stéphane Dujarric denounced the use of heavy weaponry in densely populated areas as "unconscionable". Dujarric also stated that "there is no safe place in Gaza". UN Middle East peace envoy Tor Wennesland condemned the strike on a densely populated area where displaced people were sheltering.
- United Kingdom Foreign Secretary David Lammy said the strike was "shocking" and stressed the need for an immediate ceasefire.

=== NGOs ===
- The Norwegian Refugee Council accused Israel of "forcing Palestinians in Gaza to flee from place to place without offering them genuine assurances of safety, proper accommodation or return once hostilities end".
- The Council on American–Islamic Relations condemned the airstrikes and accused Israel of massacring "Palestinians as if they were sheep for slaughter, not human beings deserving life and freedom".
