= Al-Mawasi refugee camp attack =

Al-Mawasi refugee camp attack may refer to these attacks on the refugee camp in Al-Mawasi, Rafah, Gaza Strip, State of Palestine by Israel during the Gaza war (2023–):

- May 2024 Al-Mawasi refugee camp attack
- June 2024 Al-Mawasi refugee camp attack
- 13 July 2024 al-Mawasi attack
