= Rafa Salama =

Hamas military official (died 2024)

- Native name: رافع سلامة
- Died: 13 July 2024 Al-Mawasi, Gaza Strip
- Cause of death: Assassination by airstrike
- Allegiance: Hamas
- Service years: 1990s–2024
- Commands: Head of Khan Yunis Brigade of Al-Qassam Brigades
- Conflicts: 2006 Gaza cross-border raid; 2021 Israel–Palestine crisis; Gaza war; October 7 attacks; Israeli invasion of the Gaza Strip; Siege of Khan Yunis

Rafa Salama (Arabic: رافع سلامة; died 13 July 2024) was a Palestinian militant and the head of the Khan Yunis branch of the Al-Qassam Brigades, the military wing of Hamas. He was killed by the Israeli military in an airstrike on al-Mawasi refugee camp on 13 July 2024, during the Gaza war.

== Militant career ==
Salama initially worked at a school in Khan Yunis before joining Hamas in the early 1990s and being appointed as commander of the Khan Yunis brigade under the command of Mohammed Sinwar. Israel has accused Salama of orchestrating the 2006 Gaza cross-border raid and capture of Gilad Shalit, as well as the 7 October attack on Israel.

Israel bombed Salama's family home in Al-Mawasi on 13 July 2024, killing both Salama and head of the Al-Qassam Brigades, Mohammed Deif. The massive airstrike on the camp for displaced people also killed at least 90 Palestinians and injured over 300. According to the Saudi channel Al-Hadath, Rafa Salama was killed in the strike while Deif was seriously wounded. Hamas dismissed the IDF's claims that it had targeted its leaders, labeling them as "false allegations" that aimed to "cover up the scale of the horrific massacre". Hours after the strikes, sources confirmed Salama's death, who was buried by relatives and Hamas members. Hamas spokesman Abu Obaida confirmed his death on 30 January 2025. Both of his sons were also killed in the war.
