= Gaza Strip evacuations =

State-ordered displacement

- Part of the Israeli invasion of the Gaza Strip and Gaza genocide
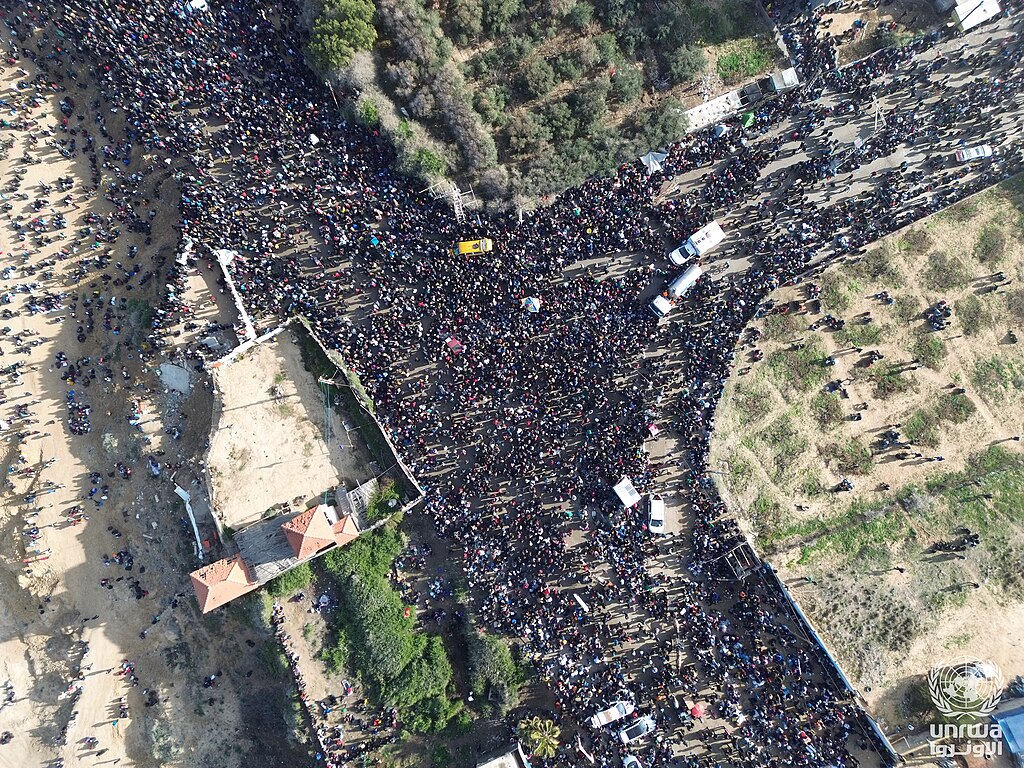
- Displaced Palestinians in Nuseirat Camp
- Date: 13 October 2023 – 10 October 2025 (1 year, 11 months, 3 weeks and 6 days)
- Location: Gaza Strip, Palestine
- Type: Population transfer, ethnic cleansing, forced displacement, genocide
- Organized by: Israel
- Deaths: 70+ (Israeli attacks on evacuating Palestinians)
- Displaced: 1,900,000

During the Gaza war, the Israel Defense Forces (IDF) ordered mass evacuations in Gaza, which the IDF said were to minimize civilian casualties in its war against Hamas, resulting in one of the largest displacements of Palestinians since 1948. (Note: In May 2024, UNOCHA estimated 78 percent of the entire Gaza Strip had been placed under Israeli evacuation orders.) On 13 October 2023, just one week after Hamas' attack on Israel, Israel instructed 1.1 million Gazans north of the Wadi Gaza, including those in Gaza City, to evacuate within 24 hours. This evacuation triggered a humanitarian crisis, which Palestinians (and some Israelis) have compared to the Nakba of 1948.

Israel's ground invasion of Gaza began on 27 October 2023. By early November 2024, around 800,000 to 1 million Gazans had relocated to the southern part of the Strip, while 350,000 to 400,000 remained in the north. Evacuees described the perilous journey as filled with fear and insecurity, citing attacks by the Israeli military and the sight of corpses along the evacuation routes. Even after reaching the south, evacuees faced continued bombings, leaving no truly safe place in Gaza.

The crisis intensified on 1 December 2023, when Israel began issuing evacuation orders throughout the entire Gaza Strip, dividing it into 620 zones and pushing a majority of Palestinians into an area one-third the territory's size. By mid-2024, close to two-thirds of Gaza's population had been relocated into less than one-fifth of the Strip, with additional evacuation orders placing 83 percent of the entire region under displacement directives by July. By August 2024, Israel's orders became so frequent that some residents stopped complying, believing no part of Gaza was safer than any other, while others could not comply due to overcrowding in designated "safe zones." (Note: According to the United Nations, in August 2024 alone, Israel issued evacuation orders around every two days, displacing nearly 250,0000 people.) In October 2024, forced evacuations in the besieged northern Gaza intensified fears that Israel was actively implementing aspects of the "generals' plan" to clear northern Gaza of Palestinians.

In September 2025, the United Nations stated that more than 2 million Palestineans were being pushed into increasingly shrinking areas, amounting to around 13% of the Gaza Strip, primarily within the al-Mawasi humanitarian zone. Originally farmland, the Israeli-designated zone was transformed into a densely packed tent city. Aid agencies have described conditions there lacking adequate sanitation, shelter, food, and water.

These forced evacuations have drawn severe criticism globally, with legal experts, human rights organizations, and diplomats condemning them as war crimes and crimes against humanity. South Africa has referenced these evacuations in its genocide case against Israel.

== Evacuation of northern Gaza ==
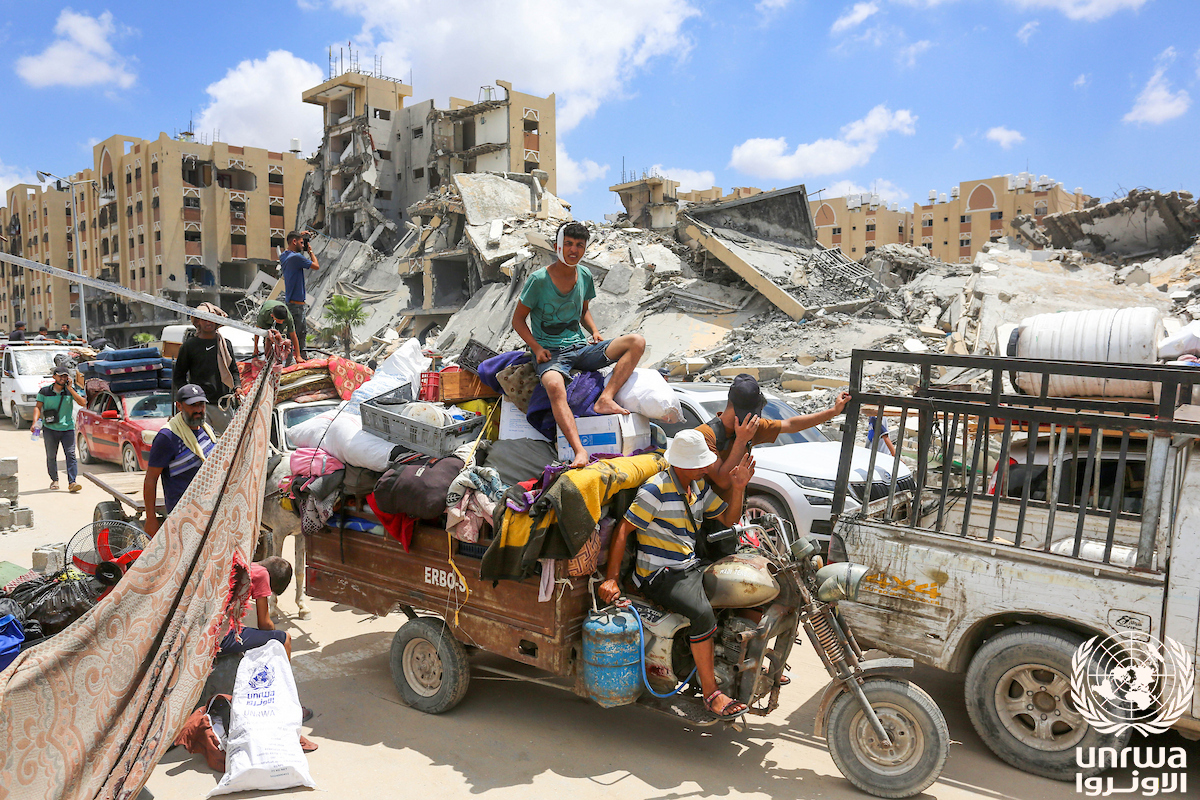
Palestine refugees enforced to flee Hamad quarter in Khan Younis, southern Gaza Strip, after receiving an evacuation warning from Israeli army

=== Timeline ===
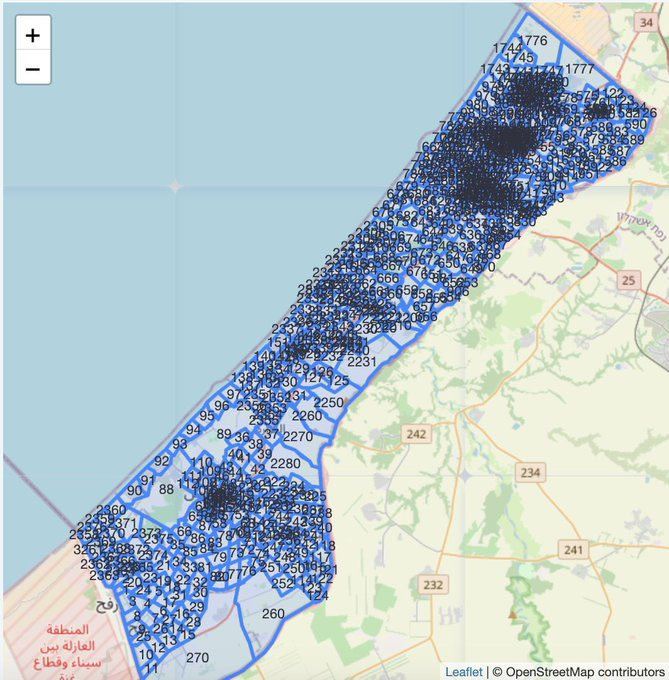
Israeli division of the Gaza Strip into 620 zones

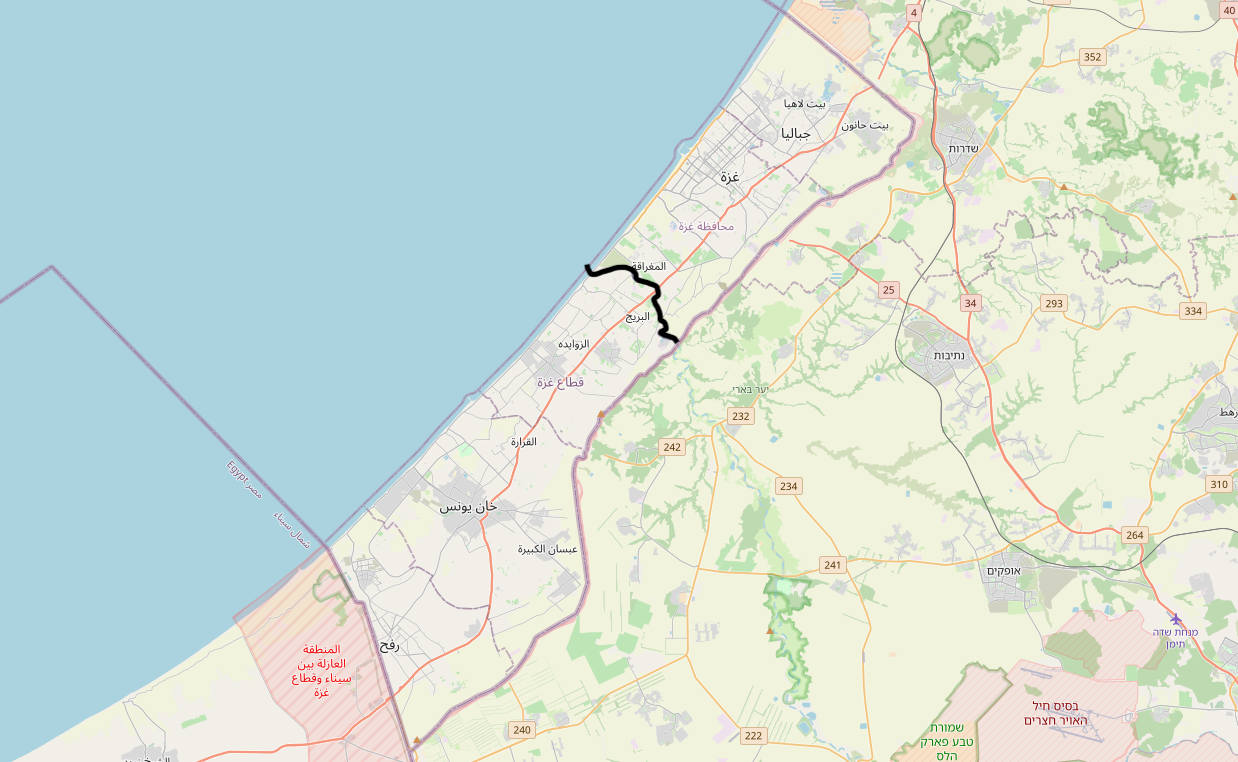
The line in black represents the IDF's boundary at Wadi Gaza for evacuation.

==== October 2023 ====
- After Hamas launched an attack on Israel on 7 October, Israel quickly responded with airstrikes on Gaza.
- By 11 October, international efforts were being made to open a humanitarian corridor for civilians.
- 13 October: The Israel Defense Forces (IDF) issued a warning to Gazans who live north of the Wadi Gaza, including in Gaza City, to move south within six hours. The United Nations declared this broad evacuation order impractical to execute safely.
- Over the next two days, hundreds of thousands fled to southern Gaza.

==== November 2023 ====
- On 1 November Egypt allowed the first "critically sick and wounded" Palestinian and "selected" foreign national evacuees to leave Gaza.
- Around 8 November, Israel announced a daily four-hour humanitarian corridor.
- By 9 November, estimates of the number of people remaining in northern Gaza ranged from the low hundreds of thousands to at least 900,000. Those who remained had little to no access to water, food, or electricity.
- On 8 November, an estimated 50,000 people evacuated northern Gaza.
  - Many fled on an evacuation corridor along Salah al-Din Road, one of Gaza's two north–south highways.
  - Civilians fled northern Gaza on foot or on donkey carts. As they passed Israeli tanks, civilians waved white flags, though some reported Israeli soldiers firing at them and passing dead bodies along the road.
  - Evacuees reported having to pass through Israeli checkpoints, where IDF soldiers made arrests.
- On 10 November, an Israeli spokesman stated 100,000 people had fled northern Gaza in the prior two days.
- UNICEF's Regional Director Adele Khodr said that thousands of children remained in northern Gaza, whose lives were "hanging on by a thread."
- On 12 November, Israel announced a temporary four-hour "temporary tactical cessation of military activities" at the Jabalia refugee camp to allow for residents to evacuate south. A Palestinian journalist noted the humanitarian pauses only extended to Salah al-Din Street, but not to any of the roads leading to it.
- On 12 November, CARE International noted, "The journey to the south is incredibly dangerous and hard. Many of those who have made it out have experienced and witnessed terrible suffering." The same day, the International Committee of the Red Cross released a statement, noting it was "gravely concerned by the precarious and unsafe conditions under which civilians are evacuating." In an article in The Intercept, Gazan journalist Hind Khoudary compared the evacuation to the Trail of Tears, writing, "We kept walking. As we walked, pushing each other, we saw bombed cars and dead bodies inside the cars. Flies filled the cars, feasting on the blood and the bodies inside."
- On 15 November, OCHA stated Israel was arresting evacuees, reportedly beating and stripping people naked.
- On 16 November the Palestinian Red Crescent released, on Twitter, a 14-second video of evacuees, including children and wounded on stretchers, walking 11 km (6.8-mile) from Gaza City to southern Gaza.
- On 17 November, the Palestinian Central Bureau of Statistics estimated there were still some 800,000 civilians in northern Gaza.
- Journalist Jihad Abu Shanab, covering the evacuation on Salah al-Din road stated men were being denied access past an Israeli checkpoint into southern Gaza.
- On 14 November 2023 OCHA said that Palestinians were reportedly being facially scanned while passing through automatic checkpoints.
- On 18 November Doctors Without Borders condemned a "deliberate Israeli attack" on a medical convoy evacuating northern Gaza.
- Around 21 November Mosab Abu Toha, a poet, was detained at an Israeli checkpoint.
- On 22 November UNICEF reported unaccompanied children were evacuating south by themselves.
- On 22 November Israel leafleted villages east of Khan Younis, ordering residents to evacuate immediately westwards to "known shelters."
- Evacuees described the evacuation path as full of death and horror.

==== December 2023–May 2024 ====
- In the case of one family, Al Jareeza reported on 3 December, three brothers were apprehended, and their family was left not knowing what happened to them more than two weeks later.
- On 22 December Israel issued instructions people in several areas to "immediately move to shelters in Deir al-Balah".
- On 4 January 2024, Israel announced the closure of Salah al-Din Street as a humanitarian corridor and the transfer to al-Rashid Street.
- Residents on the coastal side of Gaza City were ordered to evacuate on 29 January. The evacuation orders affected an estimated 88,000 people.
- Speaking in the South Africa v. Israel case, Adila Hassim SC told the International Court of Justice (ICJ) that the first evacuation order on 13 October 2023 was "genocidal".
- On 6 February, UNOCHA stated that two-thirds of Gaza, 246sq km (95sq miles), and once home to 1.78 million Palestinians, was under evacuation orders by the IDF.
- The Institute for the Study of War (ISW) and the Critical Threats Project reported the Israeli army was in Gaza City and planning to clear out the remaining 200,000 people in humanitarian shelters.
- The ISW reported that Israeli forces were building a road to divide northern and southern Gaza.
- Israel ordered the residents of the Zeitoun and Turkmen neighborhoods in Gaza City to evacuate to al-Mawasi.
- The head of communications at Islamic Relief reported that Palestinians in northern Gaza were evacuating by foot due to severe fuel shortages.
- On 14 May, Israel ordered the immediate evacuations of the al-Karama, Sultan and al-Zuhur neighborhoods.
- The UN stated that Israel's latest evacuation orders had displaced at least 100,000 people from northern Gaza.
- 15 people were reportedly killed at the gate of an evacuation center in the Jabalia refugee camp.

==== June 2024–present ====
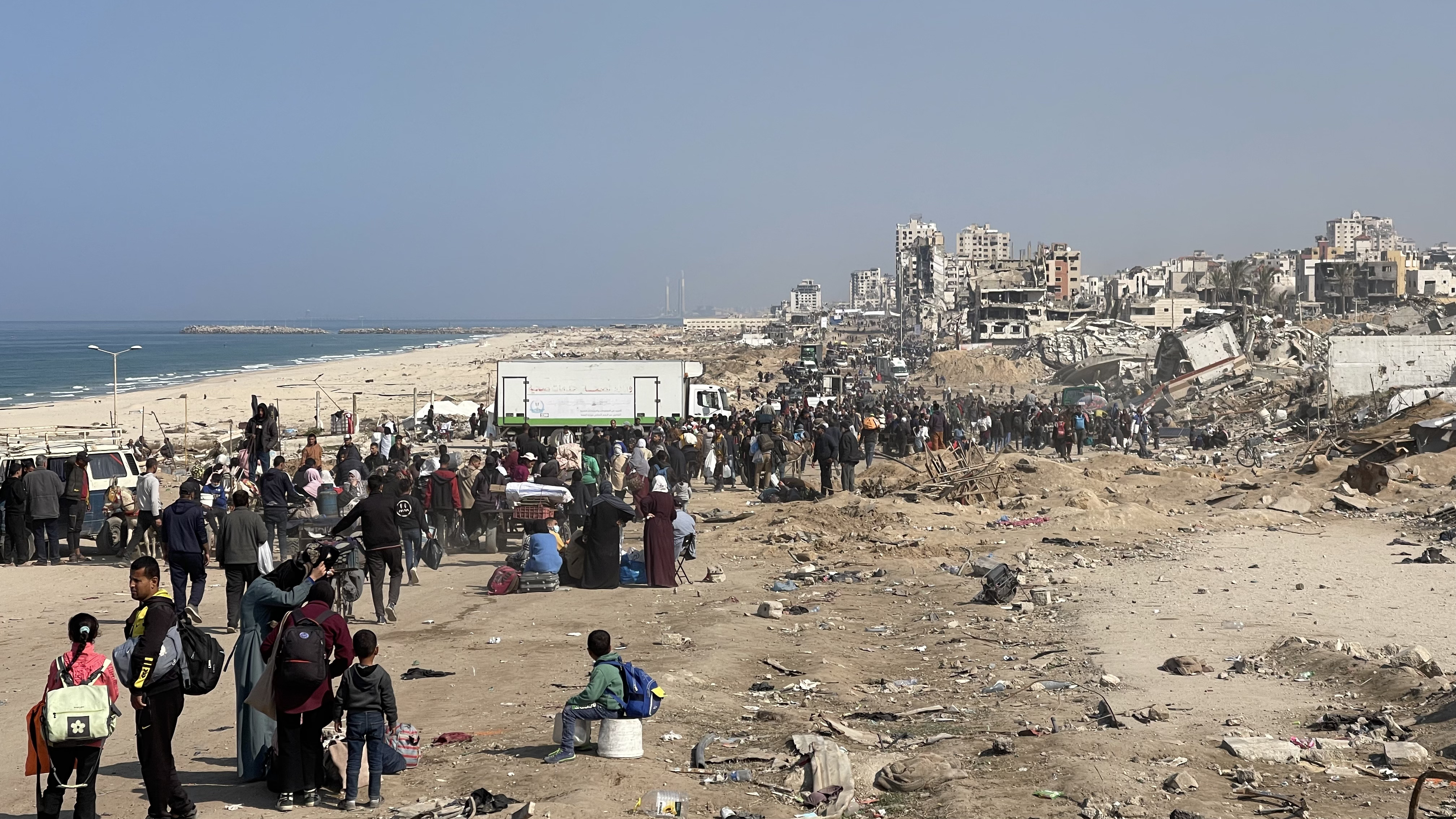
Displaced Palestinians in the ruins of Gaza in February 2025

- On 30 June, the United Nations Office for the Coordination of Humanitarian Affairs stated that between 60,000 and 80,000 people had been displaced from Shuja'iyya in the prior days.
- On 7 July, the IDF ordered the central parts of Gaza City to evacuate to the western part of the city.
- On 9 July, U.N. spokesman Stephane Dujarric stated residents of Gaza City were fleeing Israel's military advancements on the city, stating they were being "displaced under fire and bombardment".
- On 10 July, Israel ordered the complete evacuation of Gaza City, affecting as many as 250,000 people.
  - Israel dropped leaflets telling "all those in Gaza City" to go to Deir al-Balah.
  - In response to the evacuation order, some residents stated they would not leave, stating there was nowhere safe in Gaza.
    - The Associated Press reported there was "no mass exodus" since residents believed there was no safe refuge.
- The International Committee of the Red Cross stated on 13 July that "entire families are trapped and desperately seek security. The huge needs are beyond our capacity to respond".
- A displaced person from Gaza City in Deir al-Balah stated, "Where should we go next? The entire Gaza Strip is under fire and we are being hunted like deer in a forest. When is enough?"
- On 7 August 2024, Israel ordered the evacuations of districts in Beit Hanoun and Beit Lahiya.
- Israel ordered the evacuation of the Maghazi refugee camp on 17 August 2024. Some residents of northern Gaza refused to evacuate, stating there was nowhere safe in Gaza.
- Thousands fled Deir el-Balah following Israeli evacuation orders on 22 August 2024. Additional orders were issued for Deir el-Balah four days later.
- In late-September 2024, Netanyahu was considering a plan to force out all civilians in northern Gaza and place anyone remaining there following the orders under a complete siege. Former National Security Council chief Giora Eiland recommended that the entire northern Gaza Strip be emptied, and that anyone remaining would be killed or arrested.
- On 6 October, Israel ordered the mass evacuation of the estimated 300,000 people remaining in northern Gaza Strip, with the army reportedly "systematically working to empty northern Gaza."

=== Hospitals ===
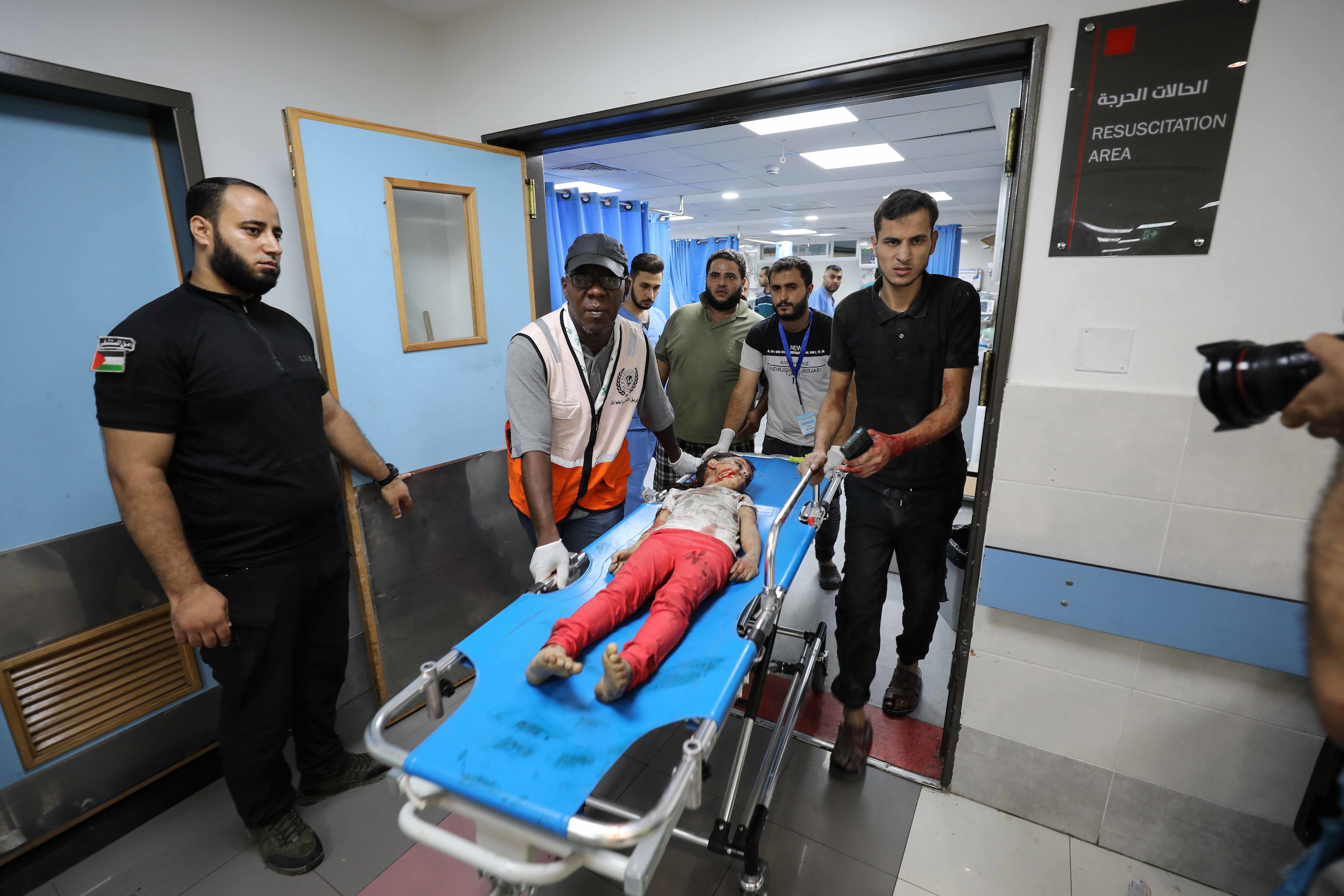
Al-Shifa Hospital on 11 October 2023

On 14 October 2023, Israel ordered the evacuation of 22 hospitals in northern Gaza. The WHO described the order as a "death sentence" for the sick and wounded. Doctors Without Borders issued a statement calling the order "outrageous," "an attack on medical care and on humanity," and condemned it "in the strongest possible terms." The World Health Organisation released a plea requesting Israel to rescind the orders, noting the extreme difficulty moving patients in critical care, the depletion of medical supplies, and that "the four Ministry of Health hospitals in south Gaza are already beyond capacity". Similar statements were issued by UNICEF and IRC. The WHO expressed concern about the evacuation order sent to the al-Quds Hospital in Gaza.

On 29 October 2023, Tedros Adhanom Ghebreyesus, the head of the World Health Organization, described reports from the Palestinian Red Crescent that the al-Quds hospital had received an urgent evacuation warning and notice that it was "going to be bombarded" as "deeply concerning." He reiterated that it was "impossible to evacuate hospitals full of patients without endangering their lives."

Doctors across northern Gaza stated they were unable to follow Israel's evacuation order, since their patients, including newborns in the ICU, would die. On Monday 16 October 2023, Israel ordered the al-Ahli Arab Hospital, and the rest of northern Gaza, to evacuate. Because of insufficient beds in the southern Gaza Strip and no means of transporting patients, such as newborns in incubators or patients on ventilators, the evacuation orders were widely regarded as impossible to comply with. On 17 October 2023, a widely condemned explosion in the al-Ahli courtyard resulted in significant fatalities.

On 10 November 2023, Muhammad Abu Salmiya, the director of Al Shifa hospital, noted that despite Israeli bombings, medical staff would stay with patients until the "last moment." Abu Salmiya stated, "There is a war against hospitals... this has never happened in any war." On 12 November 2023, the IDF announced that it was enabling a safe passage from Al-Shifa, Rantisi, and Nasser hospitals, and opened and secured an additional one to help people to evacuate to the south. On 13 November, however, the Gaza Health Ministry stated thousands of patients were unable to evacuate, after Israel's military encircled health facilities.

On 14 November 2023, Human Rights Watch noted the impossibility of evacuation from al-Shifa Hospital, stating, "There is no reliably safe route to evacuate. Satellite imagery confirms fires, military operations, and roadblocks on every conceivable route. And many sick and injured people in the hospital wouldn't be able to evacuate even if the roads were clear." At least 40 patients died during the Al-Shifa Hospital siege and its subsequent evacuation.

In October 2024, three hospitals, Al-Awda Hospital, Indonesia Hospital, and Kamal Adwan Hospital, were ordered to evacuate by the Israeli army. Medics in northern Gaza hospitals evacuated following Israel's orders, leaving behind a "very limited number" of medics remaining with patients unable to be moved.

=== Attempts to return north ===
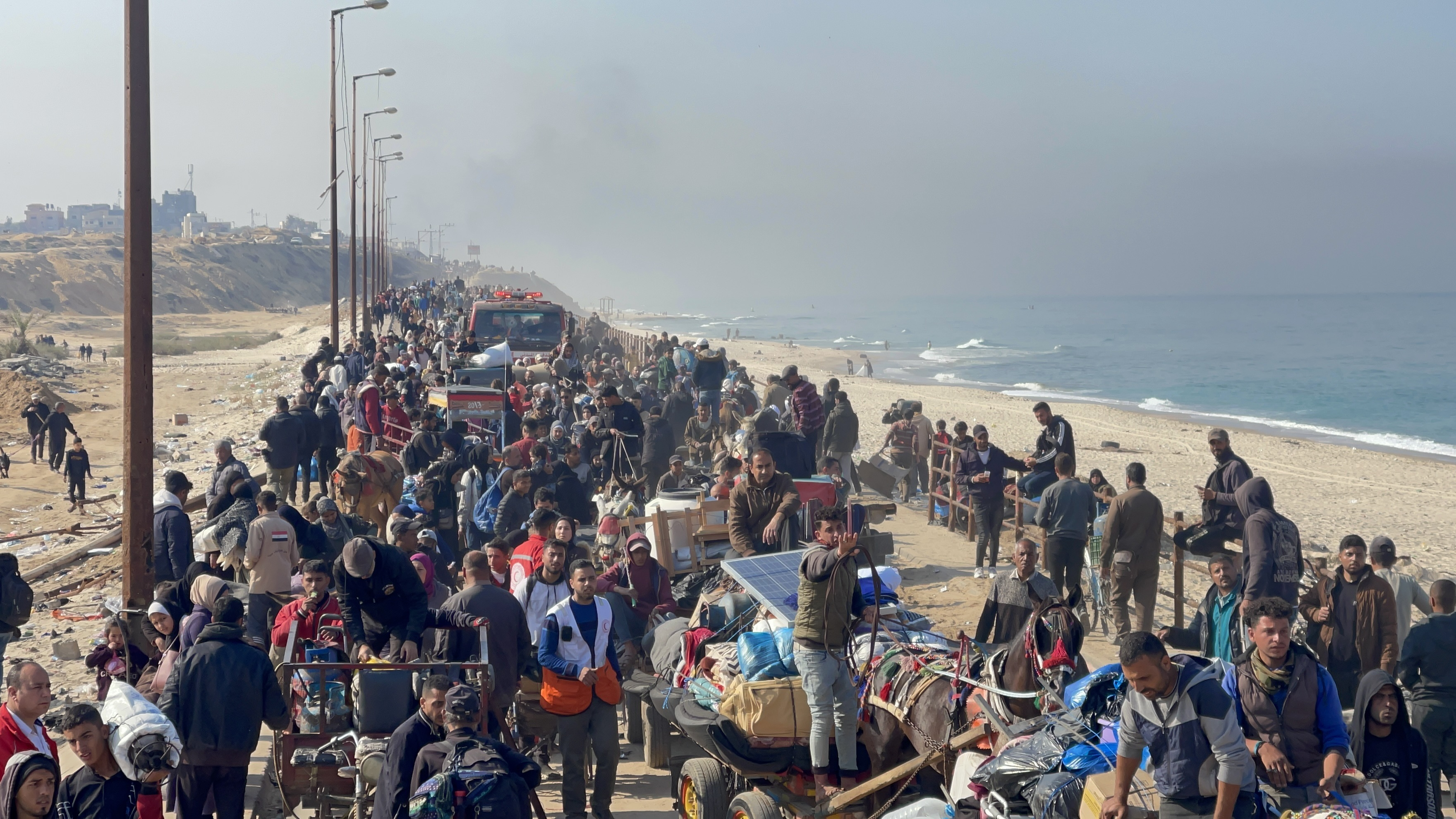
Return of displaced Palestinians from the south to the northern Gaza Strip during the ceasefire in January 2025

On 22 November 2023, Israel and Hamas agreed to a temporary ceasefire. In response, internally-displaced persons in the south attempted to return north. Israeli soldiers fired at the evacuees, killing two and wounding eleven. The IDF issued a warning telling evacuees not to attempt to return north.

On 29 November some individuals were able to return to the al-Nasr Hospital and raised claims that IDF forces had abandoned medically complex children who died and decomposed in their beds. The hospital director had told Euro-Med Human Rights Monitor he had sent an appeal to aid groups about the children after being forced to evacuate and leave them behind by IDF forces. Two independent forensic pathologists reviewed the raw footage for NBC News saying that the advanced stages of decomposition of the dead infants is consistent with the roughly two weeks from the time the infants would have been abandoned to the date the video was shot. In February 2024, displaced Palestinians who returned to Gaza City "found that their homes, and even their neighbourhoods, no longer exist."

On 26 February 2024, Yoav Gallant stated people would be allowed to return to northern Gaza "only after all hostages" had been released. Israel was reportedly considering setting up tent cities in central Gaza and Khan Younis. On 14 April 2024, thousands of Palestinians attempted to return to northern Gaza but faced Israeli gunfire on al-Rasheed Street.

== Attacks on civilians during evacuation ==
Both Hamas and the IDF accused each other of preventing the evacuation of Palestinians from northern Gaza. According to Hamas, Israeli airstrikes bombed and killed civilians complying with the evacuation order. According to the IDF, Hamas bombed, shot, and placed roadblocks for civilians trying to escape. Hamas told civilians that roads were unsafe, stating that Israel had attacked trucks carrying evacuees. The IDF also alleged that Hamas instructed civilians to return to the north.

On 13 October 2023, Gaza mosques broadcast messages telling Gaza Strip residents to not evacuate, stating, "Hold on to your homes. Hold on to your land." On 14 October, the IDF said Palestinians moving south were stuck in traffic caused by Hamas' roadblocks. Hamas instructed civilians not to evacuate, and there are multiple reports indicating that Hamas physically hindered Gazans from fleeing to the south.

By August 2024, an analysis by the Critical Threats Project and the Institute for the Study of War stated that "evacuation orders are no longer a reliable indicator for imminent Israeli ground operations".

=== Missile attacks ===
On 13 October 2023, multiple bombings targeted Palestinians attempting to leave northern Gaza City, killing 70 people, mostly women and children, and injuring 200. (Note: The bombings coincided with the evacuation directive from Israel, urging more than a million residents from northern Gaza to move to the southern part of the territory.) Hamas issued a statement accusing Israel of bombing civilians. In return, Israel accused Hamas of blocking Palestinians' evacuation, in order to use them as "human shields." Although there are disputes about the exact details of the attacks, a number of sources attribute responsibility to an Israeli missile strike.

On 3 November 2023, fourteen people were killed by an Israeli bombardment while attempting to evacuate northern Gaza. On 11 November, the United Nations noted several explosions had hit the evacuation corridor on Salah al-Din Road, resulting in fatalities and injuries.

=== Tank attacks ===
On 30 October 2023, Israeli tanks blocked the roads connecting Gaza City to southern Gaza and fired on civilian vehicles complying with Israeli orders to evacuate. In one instance, a tank at Netzarim attacked a car and a bus, killing three people. On 3 February 2024, an Israeli military vehicle reportedly opened fire on civilians fleeing Khan Younis.

=== Gunfire attacks ===
After the ground invasion of Gaza, the IDF opened protected humanitarian corridors from Gaza City to South Gaza According to Ynet, Palestinian civilians were attacked attempting to flee Gaza City. Civilians reported Israeli soldiers open-firing. On 23 January 2024, the IDF reportedly open-fired on a car attempting to evacuate to Rafah, killing four people. On 26 January 2024, residents of al-Dahra, Khan Younis were reportedly ordered by the IDF to evacuate to Rafah on a specific road, then came under Israeli gunfire while fleeing on that road. In July 2024, Israeli snipers killed several civilians after the military issued evacuation orders in Gaza City.

== Attacks on civilians after evacuating to "safe zone" ==
After telling civilians to evacuate south in October 2023, Israel continued to bomb the areas it told people to go to. Analyses by CNN, The New York Times, and Sky News all found that Israel had bombed areas it had previously told civilians to evacuate to. The Sky News investigation also concluded that Israel's evacuation orders had been "chaotic and contradictory", NYT found that Israel had dropped 2,000-pound bombs in those areas, while CNN stated it had verified at least three locations Israel bombed after telling civilians it was safe to go there.

Analyses showed that 34-42% of all Palestinians killed, were killed inside southern Gaza's "safe zones". During the first two weeks after Israel's order to evacuate to south of Wadi Gaza, 38% of killings occurred south of Wadi Gaza. By 20 November 34% of Palestinians killed had been killed south of Wadi Gaza, and by 22 January 2024, 42% of all killings happened south of Wadi Gaza. Based on this data, a UN report opines that Israel deliberately turned "safe areas" into areas of mass killing.

On 11 November 2023, the Interior Ministry stated Israel launched airstrikes in "so-called safe areas" in southern Gaza. IDF Chief of Staff Herzi Halevi stated "more and more regions" would be targeted moving forward. Following Israel's evacuation orders for Palestinians to flee northern Gaza, the IDF intensified its attacks on southern Gaza. On 18 November 2023, Israeli defence minister Yoav Gallant stated soon all of Gaza would feel the "IDF's lethal force." By 19 December 2023, Israel was attacking areas in Rafah once considered safe zones. On 21 December 2023, a Sky News analysis found Israel was directly targeting areas that it was telling people to flee to.

On 4 January 2024, the Gaza territory government stated Israel had bombed "safe areas" forty-eight times. The Gaza media office stated the bombings killed 31 people. On 6 January, safe areas in Rafah were bombed. Five people, including four children, were killed in an Israeli airstrike in Rafah on 10 January. On 10 January 2024, the UN Human Rights Office stated Israel was placing "civilian lives at serious risk by ordering residents from various parts of Middle Gaza to relocate to Deir el-Balah – while continuing to conduct air strikes on the city". The same day, an Israeli strike in Deir el-Balah near the Al-Aqsa Martyrs Hospital reportedly killed and wounded more than forty people. On 17 January, intensive bombing was reported throughout southern Gaza, including in areas once deemed safe zones.

The Gaza Media Office reported on 22 January 2024 that five shelters housing up to 30,000 displaced people were being targeted by the Israeli military. Forensic Architecture confirmed that the strikes had been conducted by Israeli military tanks. On 4 February 2024, the Media Office reported an airstrike in a supposedly "safe area" in Deir el-Balah, killing thirty people. In May 2024, eight people were reported killed in Al-Faluja, a safe area west of the Jabalia refugee camp. In July 2024, a prominent Gaza doctor and multiple members of his family were killed by an Israeli airstrike after complying with an evacuation order. In August 2024, UNICEF reported that more than half of all schools being used as shelters had been directly hit.

=== Al-Mawasi ===
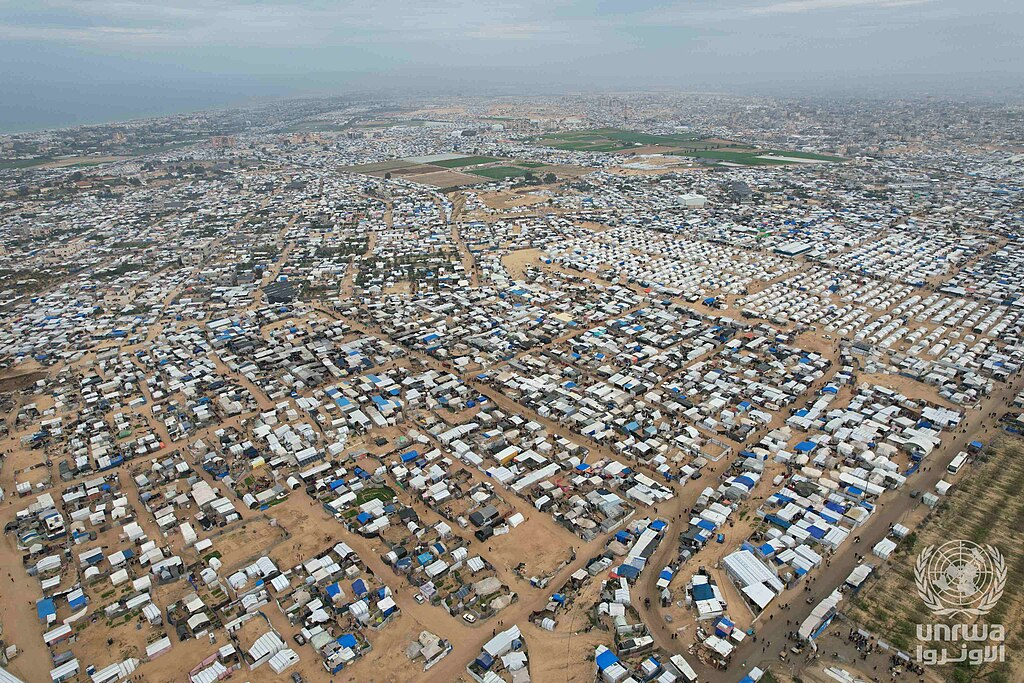
Aerial view of the Al-Mawasi area, where displaced Palestinians live in tents, January 2025

Israel declared Al-Mawasi a "safe zone". Internally displaced persons who fled to Al-Mawasi reported no water, electricity, or buildings to shelter. The UN and relief groups do not recognize Al-Mawasi or provide services there.

On 14 January 2024, UNOCHA reported that the displaced in al-Mawasi camp were in need of humanitarian supplies. On 22 January, the Gaza Health Ministry stated Israeli soldiers had raided the al-Khair hospital in al-Mawasi and arrested medical staff. On 3 February 2024, the Palestinian Red Crescent reported it finished setting up the fifth shelter camp in Al-Mawasi, able to house up to seventy families.

==== Attacks ====
Al-Mawasi has been attacked numerous times during the war. The UN Human Rights Office has stated that "despite Al Mawasi, Khan Younis being declared a 'humanitarian zone' by the Israeli military, it continues to conduct airstrikes and shelling into the area.".

- On 26 December 2023, Israel bombed Al-Mawasi, killing one woman and saying it would not refrain from bombing safe zones.
- On 4 January 2024, Israeli bombings focused on al-Mawasi, killing 14 people from two families, mostly children under ten.
- On 15 January 2024, three displaced people sheltering in a tent were reported killed by an Israeli airstrike.
- On 23 January, Israeli warplanes reportedly bombed tents for displaced people.
- On 6 February, a woman was killed by an Israeli sniper.
- Two people were injured by Israeli gunfire on 24 February.
- On 10 March, at least 16 people were reported hospitalized following heavy Israeli bombardment.
- On 11 March 2024, Israeli shelling killed at least 14 people.
- The Gaza Health Ministry reported an Israeli air raid had killed 12 people sheltering in a tent.
- On 27 March 2024, children sheltering in a tent were reportedly killed.
- On 28 May 2024, two days after the Tel al-Sultan attack by Israel, in which 45 people were killed, Palestinian officials said Israel attacked al-Mawasi, killing 21 people including 12 women. Israel denied attacking the area. The New York Times published a video of the aftermath of the attack on Al-Mawasi.
- In mid-June 2024, witnesses stated they were evacuating al-Mawasi due to "unrelenting attacks" by the Israeli army.
- A late-June 2024 attack reportedly killed at least 25 people and wounded 50.
- On 13 July 2024, an Israeli airstrike on a displacement camp killed 90 people and wounded 300.
- On 16 July 2024, an Israeli airstrike killed at least 17 and wounded 26 in a tent area for displaced families in Al-Mawasi, according to the health ministry.
- On 28 July 2024, five people were killed by an Israeli airstrike on Al-Mawasi, according to the Gaza Civil Defence.
- On 21 August 2024, four farmers working near al-Mawasi were reportedly killed by Israeli tanks.
- On 10 September 2024, 40 people were killed and over 60 are injured in an Israeli airstrike on a displacement camp.
- On 13 September 2024, 19 people were killed in Israeli airstrikes.
- On 4 December 2024, at least 20 people were killed in an Israeli attack.
- On 16 April 2025, at least 16 people were killed and 23 others were injured by an Israeli airstrike, according to the spokesman of Gaza's civil defence agency, Mahmud Bassal.
- On 25 April 2025, a family of five, including three children were killed by Israeli forces.
- On 18 May 2025, at least 36 people were killed and more than 100 were injured when Israeli forces targeted a tent camp for displaced people.
- On 1 June 2025, the Israel Defense Forces struck al-Mawasi, with the Kuwaiti Field Hospital reporting one dead Palestinian and 30 wounded Palestinians due to that strike. The Israel Defense Forces, which regularly posts online operational updates, did not report this strike until questioned by the BBC, whereupon the Israel Defense Forces told the BBC that they had "wrongfully hit the Mawasi area" with artillery that "deviated" after "technical and operational errors".

== Southern Gaza ==
=== Conditions ===
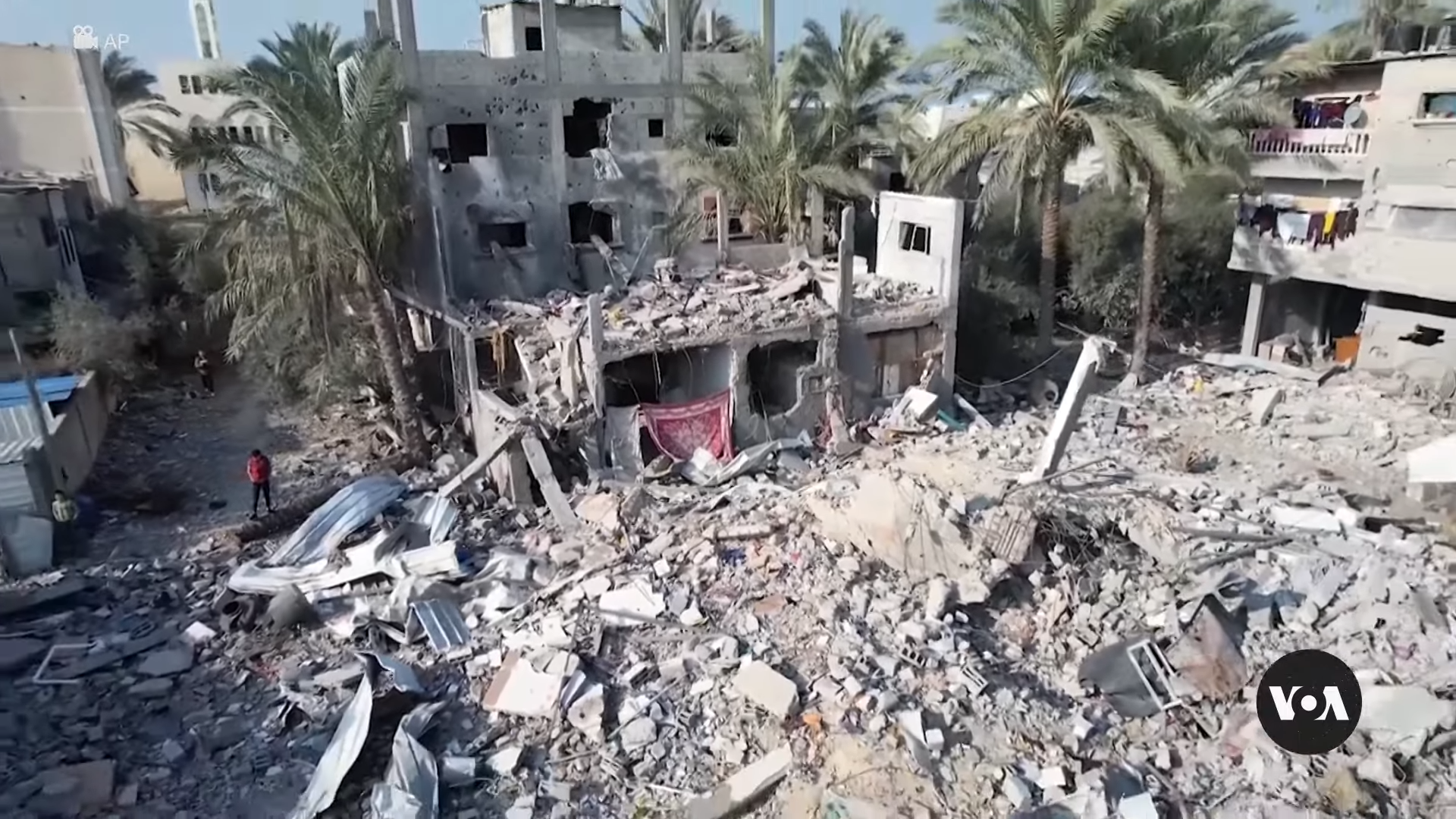
Destruction in Deir al-Balah

On 6 November 2023, Al Jazeera journalist Hani Mahmoud described southern Gaza as a large concentration camp. On 9 November, the UN estimated 30,000 northern Gazan residents had returned to the north after failing to find shelters in the south. Due to UNRWA shelters being overcrowded, many northern Gazan refugees slept in the streets. Hospitals in southern Gaza reported inadequate medical resources to deal with the volume of wounded arriving from the north. Refugees described the situation as "primitive" with "no safety." Families reported evacuating as many as five times.

By 7 December 2023, an estimated half million displaced people were in Rafah, with many sleeping in the streets as UN shelters were completely overwhelmed. On 9 December, the UN reported extreme overcrowding at its shelters in Rafah, with rampant cases of scabies, lice, and diarrhea. Internally displaced persons sheltering in Al-Fukhari reported overcrowding and unsafe conditions. On 12 December, conditions in Rafah were reported as "catastrophic," with women and girls slept 70 people in one room, while men and boys slept in outdoor tents. Diseases, including smallpox, influenza, and intestinal diseases, were reportedly spreading in Rafah. By 13 December, the UN estimated half of Gaza's entire population was in Rafah. On 20 December, the United Nations stated Rafah was the most densely populated area in the Gaza Strip.

The United Nations stated that up to thirty percent of the Gaza Strip was under evacuation orders. By 2 January 2024, the United Nations reported 1 million displaced people were in Rafah, with hundreds of thousands sleeping outside. The Gaza Health Ministry spokesman stated on 13 January that Rafah's infrastructure was reaching a breaking point and unable to handle the number of people there. OCHA reported on 16 January there was no food or medicine in Rafah.

On 18 January, the UNICEF executive global director stated, "This time as I went into Rafah, you go into the first crossing and you've got tents upon tents, plastic sheeting upon plastic sheeting, as far as the eye can see". By 25 January, the International Committee of the Red Cross stated more than 1.5 million people were living in a 60sq km (23sq miles) radius. On 1 February, Physicians for Human Rights stated people were suffering from freezing conditions in southern Gaza's tent cities. The Gaza Health Ministry reported there were 30,000 displaced people without food or water. Displaced people described being forced to flee without any of their belongings, with only the clothes they were wearing. On 29 February, Jan Egeland, the head of the Norwegian Refugee Council, stated he was "shocked by conditions" in Rafah and stated the humanitarian aid system was broken. In May 2024, the UN stated evacuees were "living among rubble". The UN stated that humanitarian aid workers were struggling to distribute water in al-Mawasi.

In June 2024, Oxfam stated, "Living conditions are so appalling that in al-Mawasi, there are just 121 latrines for over 500,000 people – or 4,130 people having to share each toilet". In October 2024, the Norwegian Refugee Council stated that more than a million displaced people in southern and central Gaza needed tent repair kits as winter approached.

=== Southern Gaza evacuations ===
On 16 November 2023, the IDF dropped leaflets warning residents in southern Gaza to move to the western side. Mark Regev stated Israel sought to create a "safe zone" in the southwestern corner of the Gaza Strip. Tedros Adhanom Ghebreyesus, the chief of the World Health Organization, said it was a "recipe for disaster." The chiefs of multiple United Nations agencies stated they would not cooperate in the creation of the safe zone unless conditions were in place to ensure safety and essential needs were met.

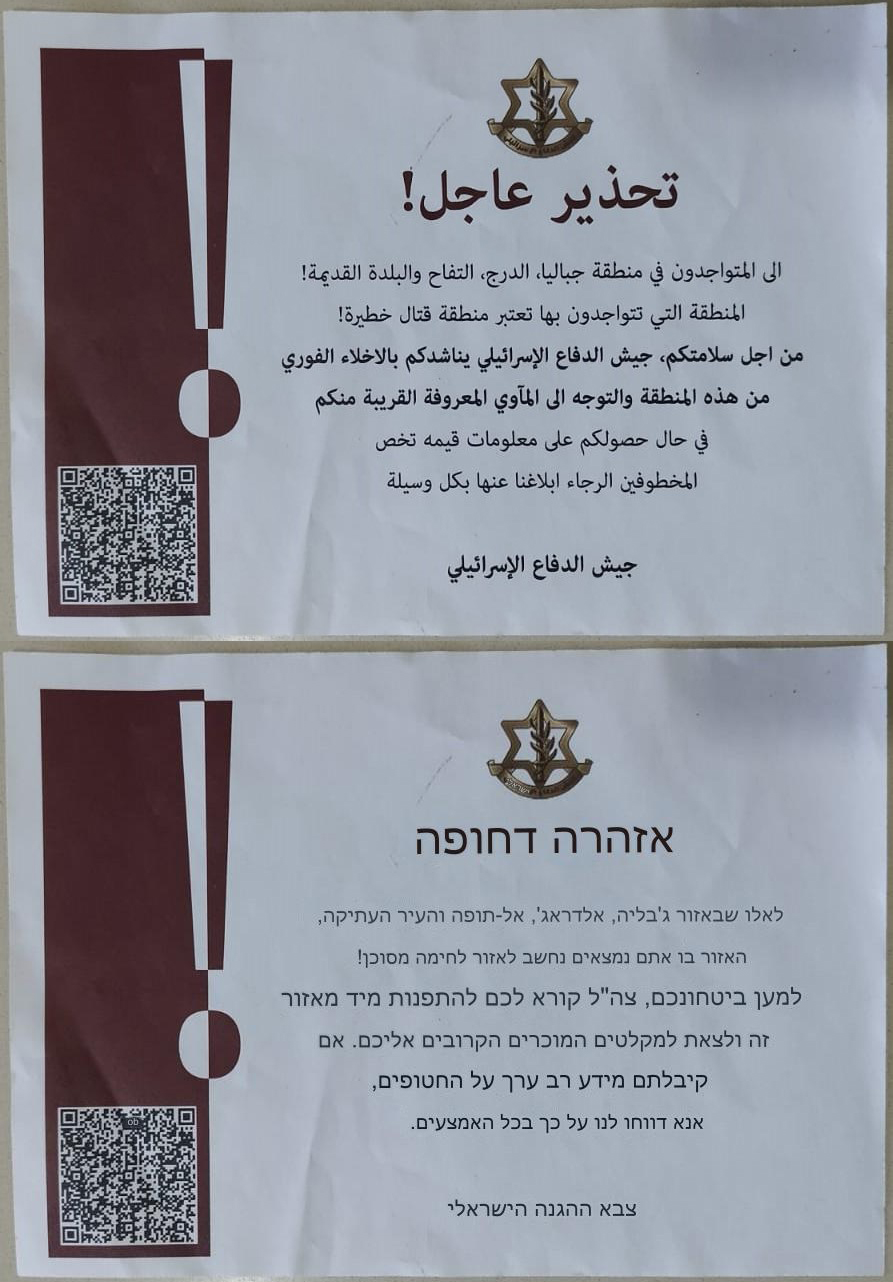
A flyer announcing an urgent recommendation to evacuate the population of Gaza from various neighborhoods, scattered in the air by the IDF. Shown in both Arabic and Hebrew.

Following the end of the temporary truce on 1 December 2023, Israel released maps dividing Gaza into hundreds of numbered districts with marked "evacuation zones." The IDF dropped leaflets warning civilians in southern Gaza to evacuate to Rafah. The IDF again recommended evacuation to a "humanitarian area" in the southwestern corner called Al-Mawasi, though the UN stated there were no humanitarian preparations in Al-Mawasi. On 2 December, the IDF issued evacuation orders to Bani Suheila and Al-Qarara, near Khan Younis. One order in Khan Younis stated, "The IDF will start a crushing military offensive... For your safety, move immediately." UNOCHA warned the orders did not indicate to civilians where they should go. The warnings were distributed by leaflets with a QR code which posed difficulties for people without internet service. Civilians stated they felt they had nowhere left to go.

On 5 December 2023, Bushra Khalidi, a legal expert with Oxfam, stated 1.8 million people were being pushed into an area about the same size as London's Heathrow airport. The vice-president of the International Rescue Committee stated people were being bombed at the places they were told to flee. On 5 December 2023, Israel issued new warnings in Khan Younis stating, "Don't get out. Going out is dangerous. You have been warned." The UN estimated the number of displaced Palestinians in Rafah was expected to rise to as many as 1 million people. Residents in Gaza stated evacuation orders came with little time before bombings began. Humanitarian organizations additionally stated Israeli evacuation orders were prone to change with almost no notice to civilians. On 6 November 2023, Israel reportedly dropped leaflets with a Quran verse reading, "The flood overtook them as they were wrongdoers."

Residents reported significant technical and logistical issues with Israel's app-based evacuation system. People attempting to flee to Rafah from Khan Younis encountered craters from Israeli bombardments along Salah al-Din Road. On 11 December, Khan Younis was ordered evacuated as tanks entered the city. On 20 December, Israel ordered large areas of Khan Younis to evacuate. It ordered the Bureij refugee camp to evacuate on 22 December. A 23 December 2023 evacuation order demanded 150,000 residents of central Gaza to flee to Deir el-Balah. Two days later, Deir el-Balah was hit by airstrikes. The town was reportedly overcrowded by evacuees. On 4 January 2024, another wave of displacement occurred as people fled the Bureij, Maghazi and Nuseirat camps in central Gaza.

On 3 February 2024, the IDF dropped a leaflet in central Gaza stating, "This is all just a drop in the ocean. Wake up. Your future is in your hands." In August 2024, an Israeli evacuation order affecting central and southern Gaza forced displaced people to flee shelters.

==== Evacuation of Khan Younis ====
On 24 January 2024, Israel ordered a large area of Khan Younis to evacuate, affecting three hospitals, 24 United Nations shelters, and more than 500,000 people. On 25 January, IDF soldiers were reportedly detaining and searching young men fleeing from Khan Younis without explanation. Residents of western Khan Younis were ordered to evacuate to al-Mawasi on 26 January. Images released on 27 January 2024 showed thousands fleeing Khan Younis. The evacuations were described as "completely chaotic." The Palestinian Ministry of Foreign Affairs called the evacuation of Khan Younis "a cruel expansion and deepening of forced displacement from southern regions."

On 28 January 2024, Al Jazeera journalist Hani Mahmoud wrote people trying "to flee the horror on different routes away from the bombing were targeted by tank and artillery shells and small-arms fire". On 31 January, the UN reported that they had been forced to evacuate Khan Younis, losing a health clinic and major shelters for displaced people. On 1 February, UNOCHA reported 184,000 people had registered for humanitarian assistance from the outskirts of Khan Younis. On 14 February 2024, Israel ordered the evacuation of the approximately 8,000 people sheltering at Nasser Hospital. On 3 March 2024, residents of the Al-Qarara and Hamad City neighborhoods in Khan Younis appealed for a safe evacuation after reporting they were trapped by Israeli forces.

In July 2024, Israel again ordered the evacuation of Khan Younis. According to UNRWA, the evacuation order affected 250,000 people in Khan Younis. The UN Secretary-General Antonio Guterres's spokesman stated it was the largest order since October 2023. A UN spokesperson stated many people would struggle to evacuate due to bad weather and poor humanitarian conditions. As a result of the evacuation, thousands of people slept in the street since they had run out of places to seek refuge. Others set up tents along the water's edge because coastal displacement camps were already full. The Gaza European Hospital was voluntarily evacuated following the orders. In late-July 2024, Israel ordered the evacuation of part of Khan Younis and bombarded the area. The Israel Defense Forces stated it reducing the size of the "humanitarian zone" and ordered people evacuate from eastern neighborhoods. Displaced residents camped in a cemetery in eastern Khan Younis.

On 26 July 2024, the UN stated 180,000 people had evacuated Khan Younis in just the prior four days. One evacuee described the conditions, stating, "We barely had time to collect our things, most people fled without taking anything. During previous evacuation orders they gave us a day or two, but this time we didn't even have half an hour." Another wrote, "It is almost impossible to imagine living among such destruction." Displaced people were found sleeping on the steps of the Nasser Hospital, stating they had nowhere else to go. Civilians began to return to Khan Younis at the end of July 2024, following the Israeli military's withdrawal.

In mid-August 2024, Israel ordered another evacuation of centre, east, and west Khan Younis, affecting tens of thousands of people. The order came following the Al-Tabaeen school attack. According to the Norwegian Refugee Council, the order reduced the amount of "humanitarian zone" in Gaza from 20 percent down to 14 percent. This was one of the largest evacuation orders since the war's start. According to an IDF statement, warplanes dropped leaflets warning residents to evacuation before the army began "to operate against the [militant] organisations in the area". The order affected 120 displacement sites with approximately 170,000 people in them. The United Nations placed the "humanitarian zone" as just 11 percent of Gaza. Thousands fled the area following the orders.

=== Attack on Rafah ===
Following Egypt's refusal to open its borders, displaced people had been fearing an assault on Rafah, as "there is no farther south they can move." Al Jazeera reported people in Rafah were in a state of disbelief, as "it seems they have no other place to go". Volker Türk, the UN human rights chair, stated he was "deeply worried by Israel defence minister's remarks on military push to Rafah. This sets off alarm bells for massive civilian casualties and further displacement". UNOCHA reported on 2 February that "Rafah is a pressure cooker of despair, and we fear for what comes next." The "level of panic" amongst displaced people in Rafah rose after Yoav Gallant stated, "Victory won't be complete unless the military expands into Rafah."

The Palestinian Foreign Ministry stated an Israeli assault on Rafah would lead to "the annihilation of about 1.5 million Palestinians, or an attempt to displace them". A Norwegian Refugee Council representative stated, "People in Rafah are trapped between Israeli tanks and the Egyptian border. I don't think the announcement of an evacuation plan is realistic. Where would people go?" On 10 February, an unnamed Israeli official stated Palestinians in Rafah would be evacuated northward. On 10 February, people in Rafah reportedly began fleeing to Deir el-Balah. A Human Rights Watch researcher stated, "This evacuation would be unlawful if it is ordered". In an interview with ABC News, Netanyahu stated Palestinians in Rafah would be granted "safe passage" out of the city.

On 12 February, Thomas White, the UN's Gaza relief director, stated that Israel's offensive in Rafah would result in "a million people [moving] in the Gaza Strip into areas that are not set up to accommodate them". The Palestine Red Crescent Society stated, "There is no safe place at all and there is no way to evacuate." Tareq Abu Azzoum, a journalist on the ground, stated Rafah was functioning like a "massive shelter" and warned of a humanitarian catastrophe in the city if the Israeli military were to attack, due to the large number of children and elderly people unable to easily evacuate.

On 14 February, the United Nations said it would not be involved in an evacuation of Rafah, stating, "The UN does not participate in forced, non-voluntary evacuations. There is no plan at this time to facilitate the evacuation of civilians". On 10 March, Israel Katz told Israeli public radio that the U.S. wanted to see a Rafah evacuation plan before an invasion. On 23 April 2024, an International Committee of the Red Cross official stated, "When we see the level of destruction in the middle area (of Gaza) and in the north, it's not clear to us where people will be moved to..." The same day, satellite imagery showed a compound of tents being built near Khan Younis.

==== Evacuation of Rafah ====
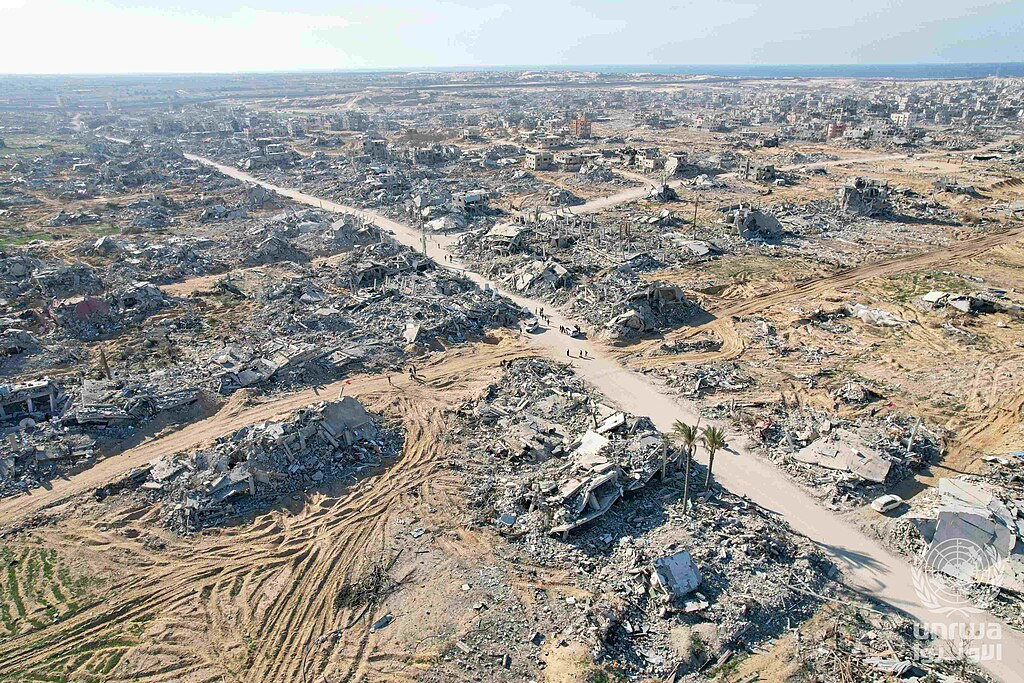
Aerial view showing the destruction of Rafah in January 2025

On 4 May 2024, Israel presented its evacuation plan to the United States, according to U.S. officials, who stated the U.S. believed Israel's plan would result in too many civilian casualties.

On 6 May 2024, Israel ordered parts of Rafah to begin evacuating. In response, thousands began fleeing the city in anticipation of a ground invasion. Nick Maynard, a British doctor attempting to leave Gaza on the day Israel issued its evacuation order, stated, "Driving through Rafah, the tension was palpable with people evacuating as rapidly as they could." UNRWA, the primary humanitarian aid coordinator in Gaza, stated, "UNRWA is not evacuating: The Agency will maintain a presence in Rafah as long as possible and will continue providing lifesaving aid to people."

On 11 May, Israel expanded its evacuation order, after more than 100,000 had fled Rafah already. Al Jazeera English reported that people evacuating Rafah were being fired on by Israeli gunboats. Many fled to Deir al-Balah, which had only one operational hospital, and was said to be running low on available space and water. UNICEF reported the roads to Al-Mawasi were jammed. By 14 May, the UN estimated half a million people had already fled Rafah. On 18 May, the UN estimated some 800,000 people had fled Rafah. By 24 May, more than 900,000 people had fled from Rafah. The United Nations stated on 28 May that around 1 million people had evacuated Rafah in the last three weeks. As Israeli forces moved into the center of Rafah, civilians reported being unable to evacuate, shot by quadcopters, and surrounded by tanks.

UNOCHA stated that Israel's failure to provide medical care, adequate food, or sanitation might amount "forced displacement, which is a war crime." A Norwegian Refugee Council spokeswoman stated Israel's evacuation order was "inhumane and unsafe" because "the al-Mawasi where people are being ordered to evacuate to is not equipped to accommodate" more people. A senior policy adviser at Mercy Corps stated Israel's evacuation orders were not compliant with international humanitarian law, stating, "Civilians are protected under international humanitarian law; they should be safe everywhere and not in zones or specific zones." Islamic Relief stated, "Forcing so many people to move is impossible without serious humanitarian cost, and people will inevitably die as a result of the evacuation". Charles Michel, the president of the European Council, stated, "Evacuation orders for civilians trapped in Rafah to unsafe zones are unacceptable". A British surgeon stated that Kuwaiti Hospital staff were evacuating patients while Israeli artillery and quadcopter fired nearby. On 9 June, the UN stated there were fewer than 100,000 people remaining in Rafah. On 20 June, the United Nations estimated there were around 65,000 remaining in the Rafah governorate.

==== Evacuation of Al-Mawasi ====
On 22 July 2024, an Israeli evacuation order included a portion of Al-Mawasi that was previously a designated "safe zone".

== Refugees ==
On 8 January 2024, Al Jazeera reported Egyptian officials were allowing individuals with at least US$8,000 to enter Egypt, leading Palestinians to use sites like GoFundMe to fundraise enough money to leave Gaza. On 29 January, The Guardian reported that Palestinians were paying bribes of up to $10,000 to flee into Egypt. Antony Loewenstein, an investigate journalist, warned of Israeli intentions to push Palestinians out of Gaza, stating, "There is really intention here to make Gaza so unlivable, which is essentially what has become in vast parts of Gaza, that really Palestinians have little choice". SBS News reported that Palestinians evacuating Gaza to Australia had their visas revoked mid-flight. On 25 April, the Palestinian ambassador to Egypt stated that between 80,000 and 100,000 Palestinians had crossed into Egypt from Gaza since 7 October. By late-June 2024, the Palestinian Embassy in Egypt stated that at least 115,000 Palestinians from Gaza had crossed into Egypt.

== International evacuations ==
Dual citizens and the families of international citizens faced a difficult time evacuating from the Gaza Strip. U.S. citizens and their families sued the federal government due to what they stated was the Biden administration's failure to help them evacuate Gaza. In February 2024, the Canadian Immigration Minister Marc Miller stated that none of the more than 1,000 people authorized to leave Gaza into Canada had been allowed to leave, stating, "I'm pretty pissed off about it."

In March 2024 it was announced that the German embassy and the charity SOS Children's Villages International, 68 children without parental care, 11 employees and their families, were evacuated out of Rafah and into Bethlehem in the West Bank. The organization were caring for the children before the war began and they were moved with the consent of their legal guardians and aid from the Israeli government. The involvement of the Israeli government, announced by the UN has generated anger from some officials, with security minister Itamar Ben-Gvir calling it a "fake humane measure". During the Rafah offensive, around 20 American doctors were left unable to leave Gaza.

According to Jewish Currents, around 150,000 people in total had left the Gaza Strip since October 2023, through dual citizenship, visas, or paying large exit fees to Egyptian officials.

=== Medical evacuations ===
As of July 2024, the Palestine Children's Relief Fund had evacuated more than 200 children in need of medical treatment. At the end of July 2024, the World Health Organization stated they had evacuated 85 patients from Gaza, the largest since October 2023. Israeli PM Benjamin Netanyahu reportedly delayed the evacuation of wounded and sick children to the UAE in retaliation for an alleged Hezbollah attack on the Golan Heights. In October 2024, the World Health Organization stated it would evacuate 1,000 women and children in need of medical care.

By October 2024, WHO Europe had conducted 600 medical evacuations from Gaza to Europe since October 2023.

== Responses ==
=== UN response ===
In a statement, the UN warned of "devastating humanitarian consequences" of displacing 1.1 million Palestinians. Shortly after the evacuation orders were issued, UN facilities, including UNRWA, were instructed to move to Rafah. U.N. Under-Secretary-General for Humanitarian Affairs and Emergency Relief Coordinator, Martin Griffiths stated that "The United Nations cannot be part of unilateral proposal to push Palestinians into so-called safe zones." UNRWA head Philippe Lazzarini stated a sustained military assault on southern Gaza could push as many as 1 million refugees to try to escape into Egypt. In an op-ed in the Los Angeles Times, Lazarrinni warned Israel was attempting to push Palestinians into Egypt. Filippo Grandi, the UN high commissioner for refugees, stated Palestinians were being "pushed more and more towards a narrow corner of what is already a very narrow territory."

In July 2024, the UN secretary general Antonio Guterres stated Israel was forcing Palestinians "to move like human pinballs across a landscape of destruction and death." The UN further warned that the July 2024 orders would "fuel mass suffering for Palestinian families". Scott Anderson, the UNRWA head in Gaza, stated, "People are often only able to take whatever they can carry. They're mostly on foot and some are only able to carry their children. Many have lost everything and they need everything." Catherine Russell, the head of UNICEF, stated, "As families are repeatedly forced to move to escape the immediate violence, the humanitarian situation is beyond catastrophic". Following Israeli evacuation orders for central and southern Gaza in mid-August 2024, UNRWA stated Palestinians were "trapped in an endless nightmare of death and destruction on a staggering scale".

=== Israeli response ===
Since the beginning of the war, some Israeli politicians have compared the evacuations to the Nakba or called for the expulsion of Gaza's inhabitants. On 12 November 2023, Israeli security cabinet member Avi Dichter stated of the evacuation, "We are now rolling out the Gaza Nakba. From an operational point of view, there is no way to wage a war – as the IDF seeks to do in Gaza – with masses between the tanks and the soldiers." In an October 2023 social media post, MK Ariel Kallner wrote, "Right now, one goal: Nakba! A Nakba that will overshadow the Nakba of 48. Nakba in Gaza and Nakba to anyone who dares to join!" On 1 November 2023, MK Galit Distel-Atbaryan wrote on X, "the Gazan monsters will fly to the southern fence and try to enter Egyptian territory. or they will die." On 13 November 2023, MKs Danny Danon and Ram Ben-Barak wrote an op-ed in the Wall Street Journal calling for "relocation programs" for Palestinians. On 14 November 2023, Israeli Finance Minister Bezalel Smotrich stated he welcomed the "voluntary immigration of Gaza Arabs to the countries of the world." In an op-ed in The Jerusalem Post, Israeli Intelligence Minister Gila Gamliel wrote that rather than "funneling money" to rebuild Gaza, the international community could instead resettle Gazans in "new host countries." Settler groups held conferences to push for an Israeli resettlement of Gaza.

The Direct Polls survey published in December 2023 found that 83% of Israelis supported encouraging the voluntary emigration of residents of the Gaza Strip. On 27 December 2023, MK Avigdor Lieberman stated Israel should tear down the Gaza-Egyptian border, stating, "As soon as there is no obstacle there, I estimate one-and-a-half million Gazans will leave for Sinai and we will not disturb anyone". On 2 January 2024, Minister of National Security Itamar Ben-Gvir stated, "We will do what is best for the State of Israel: the migration of hundreds of thousands from Gaza". On 15 January, Alon Davidi, the mayor of Sderot, stated, "If a million Gazans return to the northern Gaza Strip – that's a defeat." On 22 February 2024, Netanyahu stated, "In the north, we have a simple goal – to return the residents." In July 2024, the Israeli human rights organization B'tselem condemned Israel's Gaza City evacuation orders, calling them "absolute madness".

In October 2024, senior Israeli defense officials told Haaretz (anonymously) that the Israeli government was ultimately seeking the annexation of large parts of the Gaza Strip.

In May 2025, Israeli Prime Mnister Benjamin Netanyahu stated that the destruction of homes in Gaza would lead to the forced emigration of Palestinians.

=== Palestinian response ===
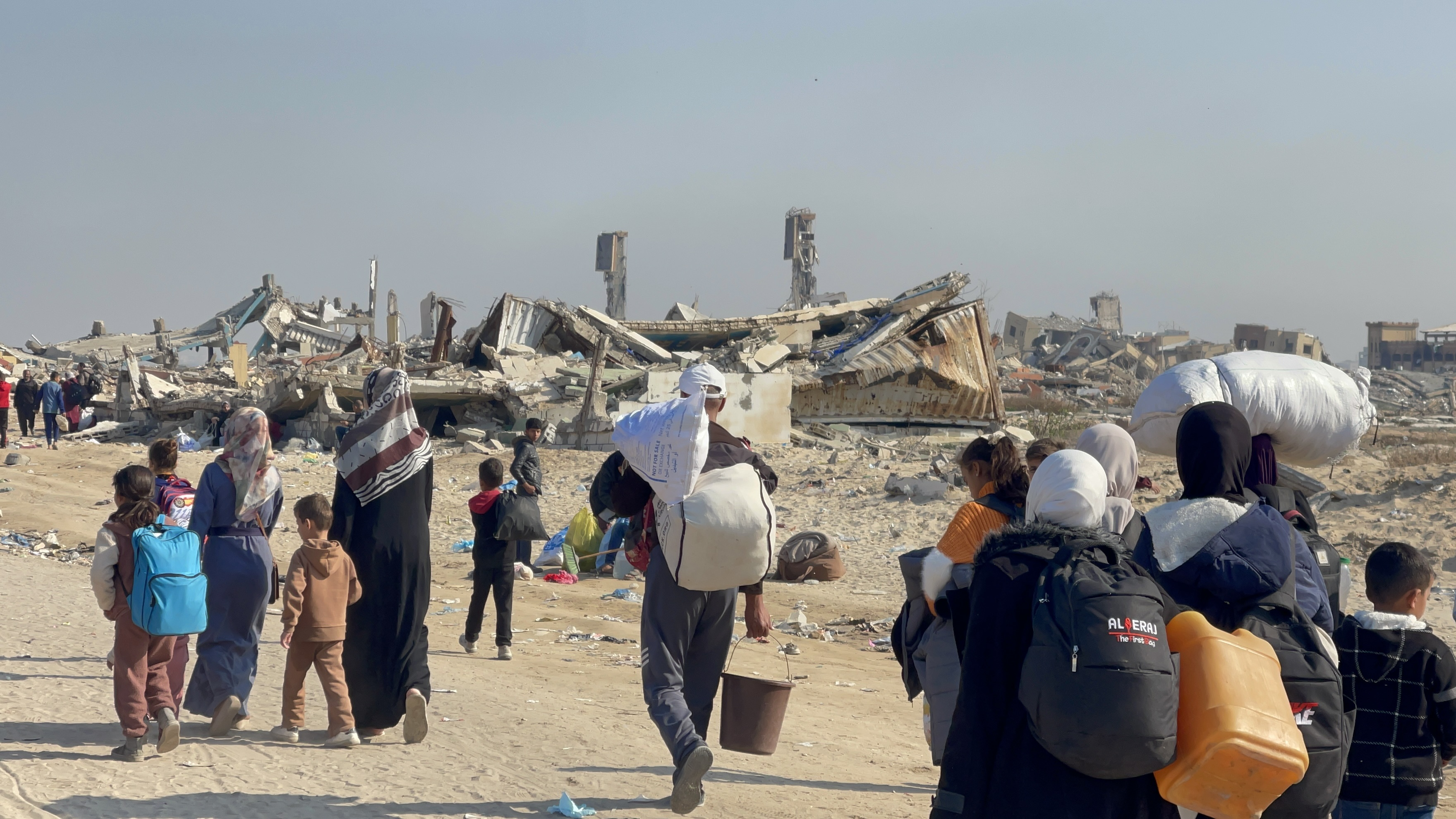
Displaced Palestinians in Gaza on 29 January 2025

In the first hours following Israel's northern evacuation orders, Gazan government officials recommended Gazans not to leave the north, urging those in affected areas to ignore the order and stay in their homes. In a statement, the Interior Ministry of the Gaza Strip stated Israel sought to "displace us once again from our land." The Hamas Authority for Refugee Affairs told residents in northern Gaza to "remain steadfast in your homes and to stand firm in the face of this disgusting psychological war waged by the occupation." The Gaza Health Ministry noted it was impossible to evacuate the wounded from hospitals, stating, "We have a duty and a humanitarian mission, and we cannot evacuate hospitals and leave the wounded and sick to die." Riyad al-Maliki, the Palestinian foreign minister, stated Israel sought to "bring to an end the Palestinian people's presence on what remains of its historical land." The Palestinian UN ambassador stated Israeli operations made it clear their goal was forced displacement. On 29 January, the Palestinian mission to the UN stated, "There is no place inhabitable in Gaza."

On 9 February 2024, Riyad Mansour stated, Israel is "saying they're not allowing them to go to the north. They don't want them to stay in Rafah – it doesn't require a nuclear physicist to come to the conclusion that there is only one place for them to go, which is the Sinai Peninsula". Speaking to Al Jazeera, one Palestinian civilian was quoted saying, "We are not ready to leave our land. I was born here, many of my ancestors were born here, and I am not ready to give it up." In March 2024, Mariam Barghouti stated Palestinians were faced with a choice between suffering in Gaza or fleeing the territory, which was part of Israel's effort to depopulate Gaza. In May 2024, an employee with Medical Aid for Palestinians described the multiple displacements as a "new type of war tactic, which can be described as geographical terror". In July 2024, Gaza's government media office warned residents of Gaza City that complying with Israel's evacuation orders was a "death trap". Palestinian civilians in Gaza stated they believed that Israel's evacuation orders were a form of pressure against the civilian population.

=== International response ===
A spokesperson for the Egyptian Ministry of Foreign Affairs stated Israel was obstructing aid from the Rafah Crossing as part of a "systematic policy aimed at pushing the Palestinians to leave the strip under the weight of bombing and siege." Egyptian Foreign Minister Sameh Shoukry described the displacement of Palestinians in Gaza as a violation of international humanitarian law. On 4 November 2023, Israel bombed the Jabalia refugee camp, leading Al Jazeera to remark Israel was "trying to eliminate all sources of survival for the civilian population to force the evacuation to the southern part of Gaza." Following an airstrike on Nuseirat refugee camp on 21 November 2023, Egypt stated it believed the strike had "a clear objective, and that is to force Gaza's residents to leave the Strip." The Jordanian Foreign Minister Ayman Safadi stated Israel's aim was "emptying Gaza of its population." In October 2024, Saudi Foreign Minister Prince Faisal bin Farhan Al Saud stated, "A genocide is happening with the goal of evicting the Palestinian people from their land, which Saudi Arabia rejects".

The Norwegian Refugee Council stated the UN Security Council had to prevent the forced displacement of civilians from the Gaza Strip. Abdullah Alswaha stated the Saudi government rejected Israeli displacement attempts. A leaked U.S. memo to the Israeli military in August 2024 urged them to change its system of mass evacuation orders. Following Israel's order in October 2024 for the entire northern Gaza Strip to be evacuated, Doctors Without Borders warned that the order would only worsen the humanitarian catastrophe in Gaza. In October 2024, Amnesty International demanded Israel rescind its "cruel and unlawful" evacuation orders for northern Gaza during the siege of North Gaza. Oxfam and 37 other international humanitarian organizations called the orders "forced displacement under gunfire". Oxfam further stated that it was "impossible not to believe" that Israel's aim was the forced displacement of Palestinians from the Gaza Strip.

== Accusations of war crime ==
Israel's evacuation order was characterized as a forcible population transfer by Jan Egeland, the Norwegian former diplomat involved with the Oslo Accord. A "forcible transfer" is the forced relocation of a civilian population as part of an organized offense against it and is considered a crime against humanity by the International Criminal Court. In an interview with the BBC, Egeland stated, "There are hundreds of thousands of people fleeing for their life — [that is] not something that should be called an evacuation. It is a forcible transfer of people from all of northern Gaza, which according to the Geneva Convention is a war crime." UN Special rapporteur Francesca Albanese warned of a mass ethnic cleansing in Gaza. Raz Segal, an Israeli historian and director of the Holocaust and Genocide Studies program at Stockton University, termed it a "textbook case of genocide."

On 13 October 2023, a draft document prepared by Israel's Ministry of Intelligence proposed moving 2.3 million Palestinians from the Gaza Strip to Egypt's Sinai Peninsula. On 8 November, US Secretary of State Antony Blinken stated there should be "no forcible displacement of Palestinians from Gaza."

In March 2024, an investigation by Forensic Architecture found that Israel's evacuation orders had resulted in "displacement, fatalities, and genocidal acts", after they facilitated the evacuation of displaced civilians into active combat zones, and led to the redefinition of civilians unable to leave the evacuated zone into combatants. In May 2024, Volker Türk addressed Israel's evacuation of Rafah, stating, "I can see no way that the latest evacuation orders, much less a full assault, in an area with an extremely dense presence of civilians, can be reconciled with the binding requirements of international humanitarian law and with the two sets of binding provisional measures ordered by the International Court of Justice". At the ICJ, Blinne Ní Ghrálaigh quoted an IDF soldier in Gaza, stating Israel-ordered evacuation areas were treated as "extermination zones".

In May 2024, a group of twenty major humanitarian aid organizations — including Amnesty International, ActionAid, Oxfam, and Mercy Corps — stated, "The Israeli military's "evacuation orders" are unlawful and amount to forcible transfer, a grave violation of international humanitarian law".

== Israeli humanitarian claims ==
The Israel Defense Forces stated the evacuation southward was for resident's safety in anticipation of an impending ground invasion of the Gaza Strip. Israeli Defense Minister Yoav Gallant called on Palestinians to leave the northern part of Gaza, including Gaza City, saying: "The camouflage of the terrorists is the civil population. Therefore, we need to separate them. So those who want to save their life, please go south." The call for north Gaza residents to head south of the battle zone was characterized by a former Israeli officer as a "Humanitarian Exodus" to save as many lives as possible. On 15 October, Israel's chief military spokesman accused Hamas of trying to use civilians as human shields and issued a new appeal to Gaza residents to move south of the battle zone.

An IDF officer told the New York Times that instead of the "roof knocking" policy, Israel is issuing mass evacuation orders and leaflets stating that "anyone who is near Hamas fighters will put their lives in danger." On 21 October 2023, the Israeli army dropped more leaflets in Gaza with the message: "Urgent warning! To the residents of Gaza: your presence to the North of Wadi Gaza is putting your lives at risk. Anyone who chooses not to evacuate from the North of the Gaza Strip to the South of the Gaza Strip may be identified as a partner in a terrorist organization."

The Jabalia refugee camp, which has been the target of Israeli strikes since 9 October 2023, was struck again on 31 October. IDF spokesman Richard Hecht accused Hamas of "hiding, as they do, behind civilians"; when CNN host Wolf Blitzer reminded him that there were many innocent civilians in the camp, Hecht replied, "This is the tragedy of war" and said civilians should move south.

== See also ==
- Evacuations during the Gaza war
- Israeli invasion of the Gaza Strip
- Israeli blockade of the Gaza Strip (2023–present)
- Outline of the Gaza war

== Sources ==
- Albanese, Francesca (25 March 2024). "Anatomy of a Genocide" (PDF). United Nations Special Rapporteur on the occupied Palestinian territories.
