= June 2024 Al-Mawasi refugee camp attack =

2024 Israeli attack on refugee camp in Gaza

- Part of the Rafah offensive of the Gaza war and genocide
- Location: Al-Mawasi, Rafah, Gaza Strip
- Date: 21 June 2024
- Target: Al-Mawasi refugee camp
- Attack type: Airstrike, shelling
- Deaths: 25+ civilians killed
- Injuries: 50+ civilians injured
- Perpetrator: Israel Defense Forces

On 21 June 2024, Israeli forces attacked refugee tent camps in al-Mawasi, Gaza Strip just outside an area designated as a humanitarian safe zone. The Gaza Health Ministry reported that 25 people were killed and 50 others were injured in the two rounds of bombing. The bombing was the second Israeli bombardment of the al-Mawasi refugee camp in under a month, with an attack on 28 May killing over 21 people and injuring 64 more.

== Prelude ==
During the Gaza war, many civilians in Gaza were ordered to evacuate to humanitarian safe zones, depopulating many areas of the strip. Many refugees fled to Rafah, with over 1.4 million civilians sheltering in the city and outlying tent camps. Israel invaded Rafah on 6 May despite orders from the ICJ to cease the offensive, and a further 950,000 civilians fled to western Rafah, including the al-Mawasi refugee camp. Al-Mawasi is one of the humanitarian safe zones civilians were ordered to evacuate to. On 28 May, Israeli forces bombed Al-Mawasi refugee camp, killing 21 people and injuring 64 more. The 28 May attack sparked international condemnation, and Israeli prime minister Benjamin Netanyahu dubbed it a "tragic error." Dozens of people were killed on 13 June at al-Mawasi in renewed strikes, but these were denied by the IDF.

== Attack ==
The first attack on al-Mawasi began shortly after midnight on 21 June. A survivor of the attack stated that her family was awoken by Israeli aircraft, and flames erupted around her camp. Witnesses stated tanks launched artillery shells at makeshift tents and evacuation centers. Another witness stated that the strikes had been fired from two Israeli tanks that climbed a hilltop overlooking the camp. The shelling landed in an area of the camp near the Palestinian International Committee of the Red Cross, damaging the structure of the building. Hundreds of civilians and ICRC staff were located near the office at the time of the bombings. Witnesses reported that Israeli forces fired a second round of projectiles on the camp as civilians were leaving their tents. A Palestinian Civil Defence worker stated that two locations in al-Mawasi camp were hit by the Israeli bombardment, with the second one being closer to the entrance of the ICRC. These locations were assessed by the Associated Press to be just outside of the safe zone in al-Mawasi.

== Aftermath and death toll ==
The ICRC reported that the hospital in al-Mawasi underwent a "mass casualty influx" due to the bombings, and that they had received 22 bodies and 45 injured people, along with reports of additional casualties. The ICRC, in its statement, did not say who was responsible. Palestinian Civil Defense reported a death toll of 18 and 35 injured. The Gaza Health Ministry announced a death toll of at least 25 killed and 50 injured, and accused the Israel Defense Forces of the bombings.

Israeli officials stated that the attack was "under review", and said that "there was no indication the strike was carried out by the IDF."

== Reactions ==
The EU's top diplomat Josep Borrell stated, "The EU condemns the shelling, which damaged the ICRC office in Gaza and led to dozens of casualties. An independent investigation is needed and those responsible must be held accountable".

== See also ==
- Tel al-Sultan massacre
- Al-Maghazi refugee camp airstrikes
- al-Shati refugee camp airstrikes
- Nuseirat refugee camp massacre
- May 2024 Al-Mawasi refugee camp attack
- 13 July 2024 Al-Mawasi airstrikes
- 4 December 2024 al-Mawasi attack
