= 13 July 2024 al-Mawasi attack =

Israeli attack on refugee camp in Gaza

- Part of the Rafah offensive in the Gaza war
- An animated GIF of the airstrike released by the Israeli military

- Location: Al-Mawasi, Rafah, Gaza Strip
- Date: 13 July 2024
- Target: Mohammed Deif and Rafa Salama
- Attack type: Airstrikes
- Weapons: Eight 2,000-pound bombs, missiles
- Deaths: 90+ Palestinians
- Injuries: 300+ Palestinians
- Perpetrator: Israeli Air Force

On 13 July 2024, Israeli airstrikes hit the Al-Mawasi area near Khan Yunis in the Gaza Strip during the Gaza war. The attack killed at least 90 Palestinians, among them women and children, and injured over 300. Israel said that the strike targeted Hamas top leaders. Survivors reported that they were targeted without warning in an area they were told was safe.

Following the Israeli invasion of the Gaza Strip, Israel ordered Palestinian civilians there to evacuate to designated humanitarian safe zones, including Al-Mawasi in December 2023. During the attack on 13 July 2024, Israel dropped eight 2,000-pound bombs on al-Mawasi, at least one of which was manufactured in the United States. Israel said that it had targeted and killed the military commander of Hamas, Mohammed Deif, as well as Commander of the Hamas Khan Younis Brigade, Rafa Salama. Hamas confirmed Deif's death on 30 January 2025.

Following the airstrikes, Israeli quadcopter aircraft waited for the ambulance and civil defence teams and opened fire as soon as they arrived, according to eyewitnesses, a local journalist and the Euro-Mediterranean Human Rights Monitor. Two members of the Palestinian Civil Defence were killed by this attack.

The Mawasi attack led to international condemnations of Israel from Arab countries, the European Union and the United Nations. The EU called for an independent investigation and accountability, describing the attack a possible war crime.

An arrest warrant was issued for Mohammed Deif by the International Criminal Court (ICC) on 21 November 2024, alongside Benjamin Netanyahu and Yoav Gallant. The court acknowledged that Deif's death has been reported but said there was less public evidence than there was for the death of Yahya Sinwar or Ismail Haniyeh. After Hamas confirmed Deif had been killed in the airstrike, the ICC cancelled the warrant in February 2025.

== Background ==
During the Gaza war, many civilians in Gaza were ordered by Israel to evacuate to humanitarian safe zones. In December 2023, the Israel Defense Forces had declared Al-Mawasi a humanitarian safe zone but had attacked it in May and June 2024. In the weeks preceding the attacks, Israel had expanded the "safe zone" to parts of Khan Yunis, and hundreds of thousands of Palestinians had evacuated there.

The IDF said that it had intelligence that Mohammed Deif and another Hamas commander, Rafa Salama, were located in a "compound" bordering the al-Mawasi area safe zone. Mohammed Deif is known for evading multiple assassination attempts by Israel. Allegedly, both Deif and Salama were key planners of the October 7 attacks.

An IDF spokesperson said: "If Hamas senior leaders think they'll build a compound and hide in a compound in an area where we called for them [civilians] to move to, we will hunt them down" Al Jazeera correspondent, Hamdah Salhut, said that Israeli forces "commonly" claim civilians are being used as human shields by Hamas to justify attacking safe zones: "We have seen time and time again attacks on areas where there are displaced Palestinians in the tens of thousands."

== Airstrikes ==
According to a Palestinian civil defence spokesperson, the Israeli attack targeted several tents housing displaced Palestinians as well as a separate house located some distance away. The IDF said that it had targeted Mohammed Deif with at least five precision-guided missiles directed at a building located in a "civilian environment" not a tent camp.

Based on videos and photos, The New York Times concluded that two airstrikes had occurred— the first hit a building and left a 60-foot crater consistent with a 2,000-pound bomb. The second, smaller strike hit a busy street immediately in front of two emergency rescue vehicles about 100 yards away from the building. Two military experts said that the Israeli soldiers launching the airstrikes would have been able to see the marked emergency vehicles: "any Hamas targets carry enough military necessity that any civilian loss is considered proportional."

According to The Wall Street Journal, the IDF dropped eight 2,000-pound bombs on al-Mawasi. At least one of the bombs used in the attack was manufactured in the United States.

According to a local Al Jazeera correspondent, warplanes hit Al-Mawasi with "five bombs and five missiles". The Gaza civil defense spokesperson stated, "We went to the location and saw children, women and men torn to pieces. The tents caught fire and burnt. They used such powerful bombs that bodies were buried underground". An eyewitness reported that the site of the airstrike looked like an "earthquake" had hit. A correspondent for The New Arab reported that Israeli airstrikes also targeted rescue teams as they attempted to help wounded victims, killing some rescuers.

According to The Jerusalem Post, Deif's assassination was carried out based on intelligence from a local postman. The postman, who was involved in delivering messages and gathering information about Hamas operations, saw Mohammed Deif during his route and reported his location to the Israeli Defense Forces (IDF). The IDF then executed the assassination based on this information.

== Attack on rescue workers ==
Eyewitnesses and Euro-Mediterranean Human Rights Monitor said that after the attack, squadrons of quadcopter aircraft that waited for the ambulance and civil defence teams and opened fire as soon as they arrived. A journalist on the scene stated that Israeli forces "directly targeted" civil defense teams.

According to the Palestinian Civil Defence, two members were killed by the attack.

== Casualties ==
The attack killed at least 90 Palestinians, among them women and children, and injured over 300.

The PRCS said that its ambulance crews attended to 102 injured patients and recovered 23 bodies after the attack, 20 of the wounded and 21 bodies were transferred to the Red Crescent's al-Quds Field Hospital, and 22 of the injured were transferred to al-Amal Hospital. The Gaza Health Ministry reported that there were at least 90 dead and at least 300 wounded in what it called a "brutal massacre by the occupation". According to Hamas spokesperson Abu Zhuri, all those killed were civilians.

According to Medical Aid for Palestinians, the Nasser Hospital in Khan Yunis was "overwhelmed" and unable to take in the large numbers of wounded patients. A United Nations official, Scott Anderson, described the aftermath at Nasser Hospital as "some of the most horrific scenes I have seen in my nine months in Gaza". The World Health Organization stated they had dispatched 50 foldable beds and 50 stretchers to increase capacity at the Nasser Medical Complex.

=== Fate of Deif and Salama ===
The IDF confirmed that Salama was killed a day after the strike. On 1 August, the IDF reported that it confirmed Deif was also killed in the strike, along with "other terrorists", after an intelligence assessment. Hamas dismissed the IDF's claims that it had targeted its leaders, labeling them as "false allegations" that aimed to "cover up the scale of the horrific massacre".

According to the Saudi channel Al-Hadath, Rafa Salama was killed in the strike while Deif was seriously wounded. In early November 2024, according to Asharq Al-Awsat (a London-based Saudi newspaper), Hamas privately acknowledged Mohammed Deif's death and confirmed that contact with him was lost following the strike. Two people, including a courier, were questioned on suspicion of helping Israel locate Deif and Salama. Hamas subsequently released a statement denying the newspaper's claims.

On 30 January 2025, the Al-Qassam Brigades confirmed that Deif and Salama were killed the previous year.

== Arrest warrants ==
An arrest warrant was issued for Mohammed Deif by the International Criminal Court (ICC) on 21 November 2024, alongside Benjamin Netanyahu and Yoav Gallant. The court acknowledged that Deif's death has been reported but said there was less public evidence than there was for the death of Yahya Sinwar or Ismail Haniyeh. On 26 February 2025, the ICC cancelled the warrant after Hamas eventually confirmed Deif's death, with prosecutors stating there was "sufficient and reliable information" Deif had been killed on 13 July 2024.

== Reactions ==
According to both Israeli and Hamas sources, the attack on al-Mawasi impacted the ceasefire negotiations, but they were still ongoing.

=== Israel ===
- Israel Defense Forces: said Mohammed Deif and the commander of Hamas in Khan Younis were in the compound. The IDF stated: "Our attack in Mawasi Khan Yunis targets Al-Deif, the commander of the Khan Yunis Brigade, Rafi Salama, and other Hamas activists". It has also claimed that it acted on "precise intelligence" to hit an area where "two senior Hamas terrorists" were hiding.
- (Israel) Knesset
  - Prime Minister Benjamin Netanyahu said that "The Middle East and the entire world will be better if this mass murderer is gone". David Horovitz wrote that Deif's death would be a "major practical loss" for Hamas in terms of their ability to continue the war and rebuild afterwards.
  - Defense Minister Yoav Gallant wrote in a statement on August 1, upon confirmation of Deif's death in the strike: "Mohammed Deif, the 'Osama Bin Laden of Gaza,' was eliminated on 13.07.24. This is a significant milestone in the process of dismantling Hamas as a military and governing authority in Gaza and in the achievement of the goals of this war."
- Media: Haaretz journalist Gideon Levy titled his opinion piece on the event, "How Many Dead Children in Gaza Is Mohammed Deif Worth?" In the article he said, "Israel will pay the price for this assassination, just as it has paid directly and indirectly, immediately or eventually, for every previous assassination".
- Protests: The same day as the airstrikes, Israeli demonstrations occurred in Jerusalem to call for a ceasefire and a hostage deal. Demonstrators condemned the attack and called it an "unfortunate event".

=== Palestine ===
- Hamas: Hamas also stated that "It is not the first time Israel claims to target Palestinian leaders, only to be proven false later". In a statement, Hamas announced: "The al-Mawasi massacre in Khan Younis has been committed against an area that is crowded with more than 80,000 displaced people. This is an obvious and clear confirmation from the Zionist government that it will continuing its war of extermination against our Palestinian people, through repeatedly and systematically targeting the defenceless displaced civilians in tents, shelters and residential neighbourhoods". The group made a statement on Telegram calling for the Palestinians of the West Bank and East Jerusalem to "mobilize" in response to the strike.
- Palestinian Islamic Jihad: the movement condemned the attack, stating that "The horrific massacre committed by the Zionist entity in al-Mawasi near Khan Younis is an insistence on continuing the war of extermination against our people,"
- Palestinian Authority
  - Spokesman Nabil Abu Rudeineh said that US bears responsibility for Israel's actions, and also stated that "The massacre in al-Mawasi is a continuation of the genocidal war against our people".
  - Palestinian Prime Minister Mohammad Mustafa has condemned Israel's "genocidal crimes" in Gaza.
  - Palestinian President Mahmoud Abbas has said that Israel and the US were responsible for the attack on al-Mawasi.
- Protests: Hundreds of Palestinian protested in the West Bank against Israel's attacks on Al-Mawasi and Al-Shati camp which killed at least 22 people, protests were held in the cities of Ramallah, Jenin, Hebron and Tubas.

=== International ===
- Brazil: President Luiz Inácio Lula da Silva called the attacks "unacceptable" and stated it was "appalling" that Israel was continuing "to collectively punish the Palestinian people" with "endless massacres".
- Colombia: President Gustavo Petro stated that he was outraged after the attack on X.
- Egypt: The Foreign ministry strongly condemned the attack.
- European Union: Foreign policy chief Josep Borrell has called for "access to independent investigations and accountability". Borrell further stated the attack represented a possible war crime, stating, "Wars have limits enshrined in international law; end can't justify all means. We condemn any violation".
- Gulf Cooperation Council: Secretary-General Jasem Mohamed Albudaiwi has condemned the attack, saying that the raid was "evidence of the series of systematic and ongoing Israeli crimes against the brotherly Palestinian people".
- Hezbollah: Secretary-General Hassan Nasrallah said: "Today, the occupation carried out a large massacre against displaced people in al-Mawasi in Khan Younis. Then it justified it by saying it wanted to target [Hamas] leaders," further saying "Are there worse injustices and oppression in the world?"
- Houthi movement: The group condemned the attack, calling Israel's leaders "war criminals" and stated that "The enemy's false claims about targeting leaders in the Palestinian resistance cannot cover up the ugliness of its crimes,".
- Iran: Nasser Kanaani, a spokesperson for the Iranian foreign ministry condemned the attack, stating on X that the attack was the "latest crime in the series of crimes committed by the child-killing Zionist regime".
- Jordan: Foreign ministry spokesperson Sufyan al-Qudah condemned the attack.
- Malaysia: The foreign ministry condemned the attack, stating that "This heinous and appalling attack, which took place inside an area Israel designated itself as a safe zone for Palestinians, is a flagrant disregard for all human life,".
- Oman: The country called the attack "an explicit act of terrorism and new evidence of the policy of deliberate extermination... towards the Palestinian people".
- Organisation of Islamic Cooperation: The organization strongly condemned Israel's "heinous massacres" in al-Mawasi as well as in Khan Younis and the Shati refugee camp, saying that it considers the attacks an "extension of the crime of genocide that the Israeli occupation continues to commit against Palestinian civilians, in blatant defiance of" the ICJ.
- Qatar: The country calls the attack "a brutal and shocking massacre, and a new incident to be added to the ongoing series of occupation crimes against the Palestinian people and all of humanity", the foreign ministry calls for an international action against Israel.
- Saudi Arabia: The Foreign Ministry strongly condemned the attack and called for "activating international accountability mechanisms" against Israel.
- Turkey: The ministry of Foreign Affairs called the attack "a phase of the Netanyahu government's effort to annihilate the Palestinians entirely", stating that all countries should stop Israel's "barbarism".
- United Arab Emirates: The country denounced Israeli abuses in Gaza, including "the most recent targeting of camps for displaced people in Khan Younis, southern Gaza, which led to numerous deaths and injuries to dozens of innocent civilians".
- United Nations: Secretary-General Antonio Guterres said he was "shocked and saddened" by the Israeli attack. UN spokesperson Stephane Dujarric stated the attack was a "another tragic example of the toll on civilians".
  - UNICEF: Chief Catherine Russell stated that "Children must be protected. Hostages must be released. The suffering must end," after the attack.
  - UNRWA: Chief Philippe Lazzarini quoted a Palestinian mother that lost her 8-year-old child and had another one injured by the attack, she further stated that "Yesterday's attack and the mass casualties are a stark reminder that no one is safe in Gaza, wherever they are". Scott Anderson, the UNRWA director in Gaza stated, "Parents told me in despair that they had moved into the 'so-called humanitarian zone' in the hope that their children would be safe there."
  - OHCHR: In a statement, the UN human rights office condemned Israel's "use of weapons with area effects in populated areas of Gaza, including in areas which IDF has itself designated as humanitarian zones, killing many civilians".

=== International NGOs ===
- ActionAid: the humanitarian group condemned the attack.
- Council on American–Islamic Relations: The group calls for the end of US support on Israel.
- Islamic Relief: The charity organization condemned the "brutal killing and wounding of hundreds of civilians". Staff described "scenes of absolute destruction" and the organization called the attack "a terrifying precedent for a nation state to set".
- Médecins Sans Frontières: Mohammed Abu Mughaisib, the deputy medical coordinator stated "I have never seen a mass casualty event like [Saturday],".
- Medical Aid for Palestinians: The UK-based charity organization calls for the British government to "act urgently to suspend arms sales to Israel and prevent further atrocities".
- Oxfam: The UK-based organization condemned the attack.

== See also ==
- Al-Awda school attack
- May 2024 Al-Mawasi refugee camp attack
- June 2024 Al-Mawasi refugee camp attack
- July 2024 al-Shati refugee camp attack
- September 2024 Al-Mawasi refugee camp attack
- 4 December 2024 al-Mawasi attack
