= May 2024 Al-Mawasi refugee camp attack =

2024 Israeli attack on refugee camp in Gaza

- Part of the Rafah offensive of the Gaza war
- Location within the Gaza Strip
- Location: 31°19′44″N 34°13′48″E al-Mawasi, Rafah Governorate, Gaza Strip
- Date: 28 May 2024
- Attack type: Tank shelling
- Deaths: 21+ Palestinian civilians
- Injuries: 64 Palestinian civilians
- Perpetrator: Israel Defense Forces

On 28 May 2024, Gaza emergency services reported that four tank artillery shells struck a tent city in the Al-Mawasi humanitarian zone west of Rafah, hitting a group of tents and killing at least 21 people, at least 12 of whom were women, and injuring 64 people, including 10 in a critical condition. The strike occurred in an area designated as an expanded humanitarian zone by Israel in the wake of the Rafah offensive which has led to the mass displacement of Palestinian civilians to tent cities outside of the city.

This attack came two days after a 26 May attack on a UNRWA refugee camp in the Tel al-Sultan neighbourhood that killed 45–50 civilians, and four days after a 24 May legally binding order by the International Court of Justice for Israel to immediately stop its Rafah offensive due to the risk to civilians.

The Israel Defense Forces denied attacking the area on 28 May. The New York Times published a video showing the aftermath of the attack on al-Mawasi.

== Background ==
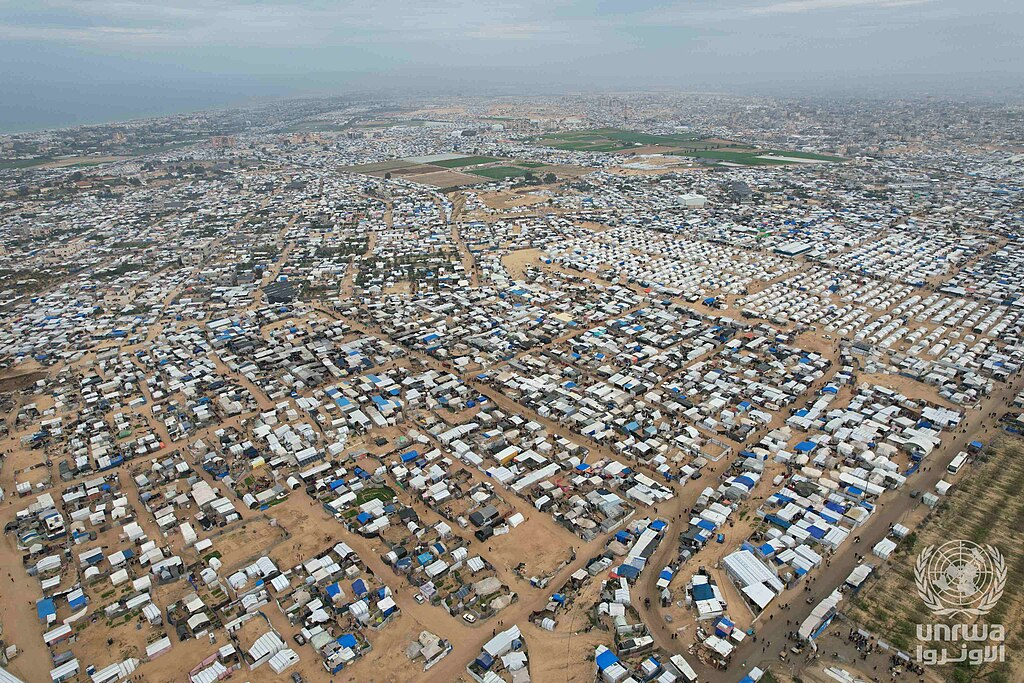
Tents in Al-Mawasi, January 2025

After evacuation orders were issued by Israel during the Gaza war, many areas of Gaza became depopulated, with refugees primarily travelling to Rafah. Rafah became dense and overcrowded, with over 1.4 million civilians sheltering in the area. However, when Israel invaded the city, it ordered the eastern neighbourhoods evacuated as well. An estimated 950,000 civilians fled, going to other parts of southern Gaza designated as safe, including western Rafah.

Four days before the attack, the International Court of Justice ordered Israel to halt the Rafah offensive, but Israel interpreted the order differently and continued its operations.

Despite global outrage and calls from government officials from around the world to halt its Rafah offensive, less than 48 hours after the Tel al-Sultan massacre, Israel shelled the Al-Mawasi refugee camp in a designated civilian evacuation zone, killing at least 21 people, more than half of them women and girls.

== Attack and aftermath ==
On 28 May, a cluster of tents was hit by shells in the designated humanitarian zone of Al-Mawasi. Gazan emergency services claimed it was tank fire, while Wafa said it was an Israeli airstrike. 21 people were killed and 64 other were injured according to the Gaza Health Ministry.

Al Jazeera reporter Hind Khoudary said that 13 of the 21 victims were women and girls".

Following the attack, several aid organizations in this part of the city were forced to close their operations and move them to other parts of the Gaza Strip, including the Al Quds field hospital run by the Palestine Red Crescent Society, a clinic supported by Doctors Without Borders and kitchens run by the World Central Kitchen.

Palestinians reported another assault at Al-Mawasi on 13 June, by Israeli navy boats firing heavy machine guns.

== Reactions ==
- Finland: Finnish Foreign Minister Elina Valtonen said in a post on X: "Devastated by news from Rafah on Israeli strikes killing dozens of civilians, including small children, Finland has consistently urged Israel to refrain from attacking Rafah with high numbers of displaced people. ICJ orders and international humanitarian law must be respected by all parties."
- The secretary general of Doctors Without Borders Chris Lockyear said in a statement: "Civilians are being massacred. They are being pushed into areas they were told would be safe only to be subjected to relentless airstrikes and heavy fighting."
- 19 aid groups said in a joint statement: "As Israeli attacks intensify on Rafah, the unpredictable trickle of aid into Gaza has created a mirage of improved access, while the humanitarian response is in reality on the verge of collapse."

== See also ==
- Tel al-Sultan massacre
- Al-Maghazi refugee camp airstrikes
- al-Shati refugee camp airstrikes
- June 2024 Al-Mawasi refugee camp attack
- 13 July 2024 Al-Mawasi airstrikes
- 4 December 2024 al-Mawasi attack
