= Tel al-Sultan attack =

2024 Israeli airstrike on refugee camp in Gaza

- Part of the Rafah offensive and attacks on refugee camps during the Gaza war
- The ensuing fire at the tent camp

- Location within the Gaza Strip
- Location: 31°19′10″N 34°15′06″E; Kuwaiti Peace Camp I, Tel al-Sultan, Rafah, Gaza Strip
- Date: 26 May 2024; ~20:45 (UTC+02:00)
- Attack type: Airstrikes
- Deaths: 45–50 Palestinians (Note: Including at least 12 women, 8 children, and 3 elderly.); 4 Hamas members
- Injuries: 200+ civilians 1 Hamas commander
- Perpetrator: Israeli Air Force

On 26 May 2024, the Israeli Air Force bombed a displacement camp in Tel al-Sultan, Rafah. The attack, which set the camp on fire, killed between 45 and 50 Palestinians and injured more than 200. Sometimes referred to as the Rafah tent massacre or as the Tent Massacre (Arabic: مجزرة الخيم, romanized: Majzarat al-khiyam), it was the deadliest incident of the Rafah offensive.

When Israel invaded Rafah and ordered the evacuation of its east, some citizens fled to other parts of the city, like Tel al-Sultan, seeking safety. One week before the bombing, Israel had designated the neighborhood as a "safe zone" and dropped leaflets instructing Palestinians to move there. Two days before the attack, the International Court of Justice ordered Israel to halt its offensive, but Israel interpreted the order differently and continued its operations.

On the night of the attack, Israel struck the neighborhood with two U.S. made GBU-39 glide bombs. The bombs ignited a fire in the "Kuwaiti Peace" tent camp; many civilians were trapped and burned alive. Israel killed four militants (Note: Including two commanders) and injured one commander. It claimed it attacked an outer "Hamas compound" and accidentally set off the fire. However, videos and satellite images showed that the location of the airstrike was inside the refugee camp itself, and some sources alleged Israel deliberately targeted civilians. Military analysts stated that bombs used by Israel have a large effect radius, and therefore should not have been used in a densely populated civilian area. An investigation by Amnesty International concluded that militants were in the camp, but that Israel knowingly put civilians at risk. Images of the attack spread internationally, described as "some of the worst" of the war.

== Background ==
After evacuation orders were issued by Israel during the Gaza war, many areas of Gaza became depopulated, with refugees primarily traveling to Rafah. Rafah became dense and overcrowded, with over 1.4 million civilians sheltering in the area. However, when Israel first invaded the city, it ordered the eastern neighborhoods evacuated. An estimated 950,000 civilians fled, going to other parts of southern Gaza designated as safe, including where the attack took place in western Rafah.

Two days before the attack, the International Court of Justice (ICJ) ordered Israel to halt the Rafah offensive. However, Israel interpreted the order as merely to comply with international law, not necessarily stop the offensive, and continued. The Euro-Med Monitor reported that in the 48 hours since the order was issued, Israel had launched over 60 airstrikes in the city. The attack came shortly after Hamas launched rockets at Tel Aviv, the first salvo fired at the city since approximately late January 2024. The IDF said eight rockets were fired from the Rafah area, though were intercepted.

== Designation as a "safe zone" ==
Many sources reported that the area that Israel attacked had previously been designated by Israel as a "safe zone". CBC News showed pictures of Israeli leaflets that read:

For your safety, the Israeli Defence Force is asking you to leave these areas immediately and to go to known shelters in Deir el Balah or the humanitarian area in Tel al-Sultan through Beach Road. And don't blame us after we warned you.

NPR reported that Israeli leaflets urging civilians to evacuate to Tel al-Sultan had been dropped one week before the bombing. Witnesses speaking to Agence France Press confirmed they only came to Tel al-Sultan on instructions from IDF leaflets. Abed Mohammed Al-Attar, whose family would later be killed in the attack, said the Israeli forces had told residents that this area was a safe zone. The Palestinian Red Crescent Society stated that the location had been designated by Israel as a "humanitarian area" and it was not included in areas that Israel's military ordered evacuated earlier this month.

In addition to being designated as a safe zone, there was a question of whether the attack also fell inside the "al-Mawasi humanitarian zone" as announced by Israel. Under the original boundaries, as announced by Israel on 6 December 2023, the attack took place inside the zone. On 6 May, Israel changed the boundaries of this zone. Under the new boundaries, the attack took place outside the humanitarian zone, a fact that was emphasized by the IDF on 27 May. However, Forensic Architecture states that the 6 May change was not effectively communicated to Gazans, including those who had already sought refuge there. Satellite imagery confirmed that new tents continued to be built in this area from 6 to 26 May, indicating Palestinian civilians were unaware that Israel had changed the zone's borders.

== Attack ==
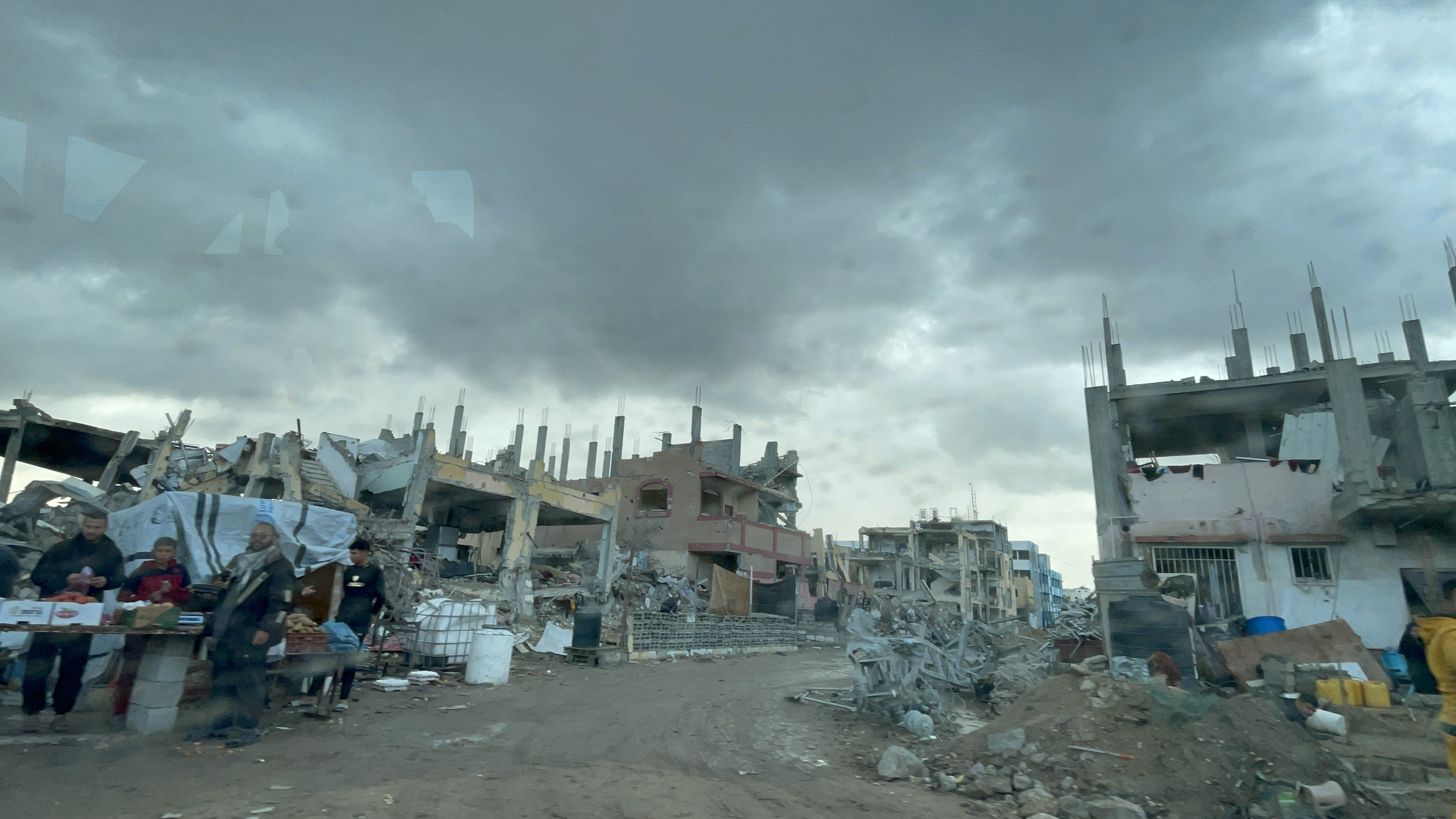
Middle Street through the refugee camp

On the night of 26 May, Israeli fighter jets struck the "Kuwaiti Peace" tent camp in Tel al-Sultan. The camp was noted to be 200 metres (660 ft) from the largest UNRWA humanitarian aid storage warehouse in the Gaza Strip. Multiple people were killed and injured in the initial explosion. Witnesses reported "a deadly hail of shrapnel, then the sound of screaming". A dead woman was later found with shrapnel in her lungs and heart.

A witness said that he heard an explosion, walked out of his house, and saw smoke in a nearby street. Survivors of the attack said it "burned people alive" and destroyed an entire block. The Palestine Red Crescent Society said civilians were trapped in the flames. A video verified by NBC News showed Palestinians screaming for help in tents "engulfed by flames" with civil defense crews attempting to stop the fire and rescue people. Other videos displayed burnt corpses, including one of a decapitated child. Paramedics later retrieved these bodies.

It was the deadliest incident of the Rafah offensive. The attack was described as a massacre by multiple media outlets, some of whom referred to it as the Rafah tent massacre (Note: Non-exhaustive list of sources describing the event as "Rafah tent massacre":) or the tent massacre. (Note: Arabic: مجزرة الخيم) Israel stated it had targeted a Hamas compound and killed two senior Hamas commanders: the West Bank Chief of Staff Yassin Rabia and senior official Khaled Nagar, "in accordance with international law". John Kirby stated that Hamas confirmed the deaths of the two commanders. However, witnesses speaking to Mondoweiss and CNN said that no militants were found in the camp.

== Casualties ==
The Gaza Health Ministry (GHM), stated the attack killed at least 45 people, and ActionAid UK said it killed 50. The GHM said that among the fatalities were at least 12 women, eight children, and three elderly. Doctors Without Borders said that dozens of civilians were injured, with the GHM eventually confirming 65 injuries. It later raised the number of injuries to over 200. Victims of the attack were rushed to the Emirati Hospital, but the GHM said that Rafah hospitals didn't have enough resources to deal with the number of injured people. The only hospital in Rafah had eight beds and no intensive care units.

== Analysis and investigation ==
The attack drew multiple independent investigations and analyses from media outlets and military analysts. Egypt, the Palestinian Authority and others concluded that Israel deliberately targeted civilians in the attack. Israel also investigated the incident, saying it was a "tragic mishap". A panel of UN experts said Israel bears responsibility for its actions and calling it a "mistake" after the fact does not make the attack legal. The experts said the Israeli attack was both indiscriminate and disproportionate.

=== Target of the attack ===
Israel said the target of the attack was a "Hamas compound" with two senior Hamas officials, whom it identified as Yassin Rabia and Khaled Nagar. The IDF said they believed "there were no civilians" in the compound. IDF had earlier released surveillance footage that showed four people standing outside the structure the IDF said they targeted, raising questions on whether they knew of civilians nearby and accepted them as collateral damage. Israeli newspaper Haaretz stated the IDF struck a "dense" area.

Satellite image analysis by India Today located the site of the airstrike to "Kuwait Peace Camp", leading the newspaper to conclude "satellite images show Israel targeting Rafah refugee camps". The Washington Post analyzed satellite imagery and found "more than a dozen tent-like structures" around the tin structures targeted. The Guardian located the attack to the "edge of rows of tents" of the Kuwaiti camp, and quoted a resident who said this location was "a medical point surrounded by a lot of tents, in an area with more than 4,000 people". A New York Times investigation concluded that Israel directly struck the camp, saying the metal structures targeted were part of the camp and intended for civilian use. In June, NBC News said that analysis of the attack and interviews with survivors indicated that Israeli commanders should have known there were civilians in the area of the strike. Al Jazeera's fact checking agency concluded the strike deliberately targeted the camp. The Palestinian Authority, Egypt, witnesses and multiple humanitarian groups also said Israel deliberately targeted the refugee camp.

An investigation by Amnesty International found that Yassin Rabia, commander Khuweiled Ramadan, and at least two other Hamas militants were killed, while Khaled Nagar was only injured. It stated that, "Hamas and Islamic Jihad fighters were located in the internally-displaced persons’ camp, a location which displaced people believed was a designated 'humanitarian zone', with fighters knowingly endangering the lives of civilians." One source told Amnesty that there were fighters near tents and in a jeep, who may have been the target of the attack. However, Erika Guevara Rosas, senior director of Amnesty, noted that "The Israeli military would have been fully aware that the use of bombs that project deadly shrapnel across hundreds of metres and unguided tank shells would kill and injure a large number of civilians sheltering in overcrowded settings lacking protection."

=== Munitions used ===
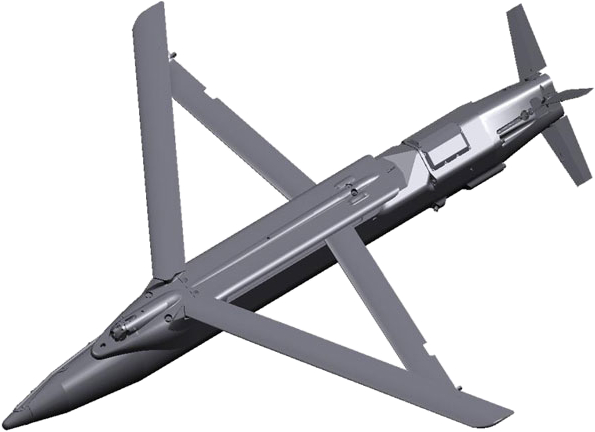
A GBU-39 bomb, similar to the one used in the attack

Analyses of video footage by The New York Times and CNN showed that the munition was a variant on the US-made precision guided GBU-39 bomb (sometimes called a missile), though the exact variant was unclear. The GBU-39 is a 250 pounds (110 kg) bomb with an explosive weight of 17 kilograms (37 lb). Israel said it fired two missiles equipped with 17 kilograms (37 lb) of explosives each. Mark Cancian, a Marine Corps Reserves colonel, said the large debris field indicated the bombs appear to be programmed to detonate in the air before impact. This decision by the IDF would increase the probability that the targets were killed but it would also maximize area damage and risk unintended deaths.

Israel stated the use of precision munitions was as an effort to minimize civilian casualties. The 250-lb GBU-39 is specifically designed to minimize collateral damage in urban and densely populated areas. It produces less collateral damage than the 2,000 lb bombs Israel had been previously using in the bombing of the Gaza Strip. The Biden administration had pushed Israel away from using 2,000 lbs and towards using more 250-lb precision ones. But even smaller and precision-guided munitions like GBU-39 can inflict "severe civilian casualties" if used improperly. The blast radius of the GBU-39 is cited as 26 feet, though shrapnel from the bomb shell is capable of travelling as far as 2,000 feet (610 m).

USAF sergeant Wes J. Bryant said the munition is not meant to be near civilian encampments and the US military would not have used the bomb given that civilians were in the "effects radius". According to Bryant, Israeli usage in a densely populated civilian area indicated "either an unwillingness or inability to effectively safeguard civilians". Trevor Ball, a United States Army explosives technician, said the bombs' fragments can travel up to 600 meters, concluding "so that just doesn't check out if they're trying to limit casualties". Amnesty International stated that, given the large kill radius of the GBU-39 bomb, its usage in a densely populated civilian area constituted an indiscriminate attack, and therefore should be investigated as a war crime. It added that "the Israeli military is likely to have failed to take all feasible precautions" to protect civilians.

=== Fire ===
Many of those killed were burned alive by the fire that ensued. The IDF said the fire was "unexpected", adding "[o]ur munition alone could not have ignited a fire of this size." Frederic Gras, a French munitions analyst, questioned this reasoning, arguing "any explosion starts a fire as soon as flammable products are in the vicinity." Likewise, a U.S. Army explosive ordnance disposal technician said "a bomb of any size" is capable of starting a fire, as explosives release a lot of heat that can cause materials found in camps to catch on fire. Multiple sources pointed out that refugee camps typically contain flammable material, such as cooking gas canisters which could have been ignited by the airstrike. Amnesty International determined the likely cause of the fire was cooking fuel stored in the tent camp.

On 27 May, Israeli officials initially told their American counterparts that they believed the fire was caused by shrapnel from the strike igniting a nearby fuel tank. The same day, an unnamed Gazan narrator said the explosion was caused by a "Hamas jeep loaded with weapons". Later, the IDF suggested that a militant warehouse containing ammunition or "some other material" in the area caused the fire. It also released an Arabic phone call, supposedly made by Hamas, in which the speakers say that the Israeli missile was not responsible for the fire, that the fire was caused by secondary explosions, and the secondary explosions came from an ammunition warehouse. However, James Cavanaugh, who worked at the ATF, said the fire did not indicate "some giant stash that exploded." The New York Times reviewed numerous videos and did not find evidence of a significant secondary explosion.

== Reactions ==
=== Domestic ===
Hamas and Palestinian Islamic Jihad condemned the attack, labeling it a massacre and calling for the Palestinian people to "rise up and march" against Israel. A spokesperson for the Presidency of the Palestinian Authority condemned the incident, calling it a massacre and called for an intervention. A survivor of the attack stated, "They told us that this area is safe... but now there is no safe place in Gaza. There are massacres everywhere." After the attack, residents confronted militants and asked them to leave, though they remained in the area. A lawyer with the Palestinian Centre for Human Rights stated the attack showed Israel was ignoring the International Court of Justice's interim orders.

Prime Minister Benjamin Netanyahu said that the incident was a "tragic mishap". Initially, the Israeli military said the attack was "under review", while its top military prosecutor Yifat Tomer-Yerushalmi called the incident "very grave". Some Israelis celebrated the attack, likening it to the Jewish holiday Lag BaOmer, in which bonfires are lit to commemorate a second century Rabbi. The analogy was made by Israel's Channel 14 senior journalist Yinon Magal, who posted pictures on social media captioned: "The main lighting of the year in Rafah" and by i24NEWS' Naveh Dromi commenting "Happy Holiday." Both posts were later removed. The comparison was also made by far-right rapper Yoav Eliasi, who posted videos on Telegram in celebration of the attack and also likened it to the holiday. Some Israeli social media users also shared memes and jokes about the attack, while others condemned the posts.

In Netanyahu's 2024 speech to the United States Congress, he said that a commander in Rafah told him that practically no civilians had been killed in the offensive, except for in the attack, which they described as "a single incident where shrapnel from a bomb hit a Hamas weapons depot and unintentionally killed two dozen people". CNN noted that there were other strikes on Rafah that killed civilians, including that week.

=== International ===
Al-Jazeera said the attack "re-ignited" protests in support of Palestinians during the war, citing protests in Lebanon, Europe, and the United States.

- Belgium: Prime Minister Alexander De Croo called for further peace negotiations after the attack.
- Canada: A legislator and the leader of the New Democratic Party Jagmeet Singh posted a tweet after images of the incident went viral: "Images of the IDFs airstrike hitting a camp for displaced Palestinians in Rafah are horrifying. Images so terrible I won't share them. The world is failing the people of Gaza. Canada is failing the people of Gaza." Foreign Minister Melanie Joly stated, "Canada does not support an Israeli military operation in Rafah. This level of human suffering must come to an end".
- Chile: The country strongly condemns the "indiscriminate attack" by the Israeli forces.
- Colombia: President Gustavo Petro condemned the attack, stating that "the massacre continues".
- Egypt: The country condemned the attack, again calling on Israel to halt the Rafah offensive.
- France: President Emmanuel Macron said he was "outraged" at the attacks and again called for a ceasefire.
- Germany: German foreign minister Annalena Baerbock stated that the ICJ's measures were binding and urged Israel to follow international law.
- Indonesia: The country condemned the Israeli attack on camps for displaced Palestinians in Rafah in the strongest terms, calling it "a flagrant breach of the Orders of the ICJ".
- Iraq: Cleric and the leader of the Sadrist Movement, Moqtada al-Sadr, called for the closure of the US embassy in Baghdad after the attacks in Rafah.
- Italy: Defense Minister Guido Crosetto said that violence against Palestinians was "no longer justifiable".
- Ireland: the vice-prime minister said the attack was "barbaric" and urged Israel to halt the Rafah offensive.
- Japan: Foreign Minister Yoko Kamikawa say that the country is "deeply concerned" about the humanitarian situation in Rafah after the attacks.
- Jordan: The Foreign Ministry condemned the attacks and urged the international community to hold the perpetrators responsible.
- Norway: Foreign Minister Espen Barth Eide stated that the Israeli attack on Rafah has "breached international law".
- Oman: The Foreign Ministry condemned the attack.
- Turkey: President Recep Tayyip Erdoğan condemned the attack, saying Turkey will do "everything possible" to hold "barbaric" Netanyahu to account.
- Qatar: The country warned that the strike could hinder ceasefire negotiations.
- Saudi Arabia: The country said that it "condemns in the strongest terms the continued massacres" carried out by Israeli forces in Gaza and that it "affirms its categorical rejection of the continued flagrant violations by the Israeli occupation forces of all international and humanitarian resolutions, laws, and norms". The Saudi Foreign Ministry also called for the international community to intervene in the conflict.
- South Africa: The International Relations Department says the government has joined the international community and condemned the Israeli attack.
- Spain: Foreign Minister José Manuel Albares said the bombing of Rafah was "one more day with innocent Palestinian civilians being killed", adding that the gravity of the attack "is even larger" as it comes after the ICJ order directing Israel to halt its operations in Rafah and the rest of Gaza.
- UAE: The country condemned the attack and stressed that Israel had to follow the ICJ's ruling.
- United Kingdom: The UK Foreign Office reiterated that it didn't support the Rafah offensive. The leader of the then-opposition Labour Party Keir Starmer said that he would push for an end to the invasion of Gaza.
- United States: a White House spokesperson expressed sadness at the casualties, but emphasized that Israel had the right to defend itself. While the Biden administration had previously said that a Rafah offensive would cross its "red line", on 28 May, the administration announced that the attack didn't violate its "red line", which it said was a "large-scale" ground operation. On 29 May, the United Nations Security Council met to discuss a resolution that would order Israel to halt the Rafah offensive. The American ambassador insisted Israel has a right to defend itself, and opposed the resolution.
- Yemen: The Aden-based Ministry of Foreign Affairs condemned the "heinous massacre committed by the forces of the Israeli entity." and called on the United Nations Security Council to "assume its responsibilities to stop the machinery of death and destruction, and to provide immediate protection for the Palestinian people".

==== Supranational ====
- African Union: The African Union Commission said the ICJ order must be "urgently enforced if global order is to prevail". Its chairman Moussa Faki wrote on X: "With horrific overnight airstrikes killing mostly Palestinian women & children trapped in a displacement camp in Rafah, the State of Israel continues to violate international law with impunity and in contempt of an ICJ ruling two days ago ordering an end to its military action in Rafah".
- European Union: Foreign policy chief, Josep Borrell, condemned the attack, saying that Israel's military actions needed to stop.
- United Nations: United Nations Special Rapporteur on the occupied Palestinian territories, Francesca Albanese, condemned the attack and called it "unacceptable", stating that Israel must face sanctions to pressure them to stop. Albanese described the attack as "yet another massacre." The UN Secretary-General António Guterres condemned "Israel's actions which killed scores of innocent civilians who were only seeking shelter from this deadly conflict", adding that "This horror must stop."
  - UNRWA: Philippe Lazzarini, the Commissioner General of UNRWA, said that images from the attack were "a testament to how Rafah has turned into hell on earth".
- Organisation of Islamic Cooperation: The OIC called the attack a "heinous massacre" and an act of "state-organised terrorism".
- International Criminal Court: Chris Gunness said that the three pre-trial chamber judges were as "horrified as the rest of the world" about the attack.

=== Humanitarian aid groups ===
- International Committee of the Red Cross: A spokesperson for the group said there was a need to follow international law, and that Gaza's healthcare system could not handle the attack.
- Doctors Without Borders: the group said the attack showed "nowhere in Gaza is safe" and reiterated its call for a ceasefire.
- Palestine Red Crescent Society: the group noted that Israel forcibly displaced civilians into that area.
- ActionAid UK: the group condemned the "inhumane, barbaric" attack.
- 19 aid groups said in a joint statement: "As Israeli attacks intensify on Rafah, the unpredictable trickle of aid into Gaza has created a mirage of improved access, while the humanitarian response is in reality on the verge of collapse."

A British doctor in Rafah said that videos of the attack were "truly some of the worst that I have seen".

Following the attack, several aid organisations in this part of the city were forced to close their operations and move them to other parts of the Gaza Strip, including the Al Quds field hospital run by the Palestine Red Crescent Society, a clinic supported by Doctors Without Borders and kitchens run by the World Central Kitchen.

=== Other ===
At United States Secretary of State Antony Blinken's last press conference in 2025, a journalist interrupted him and shouted "Why did you keep the bombs flowing when we had a deal in May? We all knew we had a deal. Everyone in this room knows we had a deal, Tony, and you kept the bombs flowing", likely referring to the bombing.

- Council on American-Islamic Relations: The American-Muslim advocacy and civil rights organization condemned the attacks and demanded that US President Joe Biden stop arming Israel to embolden further attacks on civilians in the face of several prior attacks using US weapons. National Deputy Director Edward Ahmed Mitchell stated in a news conference that Biden should not keep "shifting" and "cross[ing] his own red line" and "every red line of U.S. law, international law and basic human decency", and that him providing "military, financial, and diplomatic support" to these operations was staining all Americans "with the blood of innocent Palestinians".
- Jewish Voice for Peace: the US-based Jewish advocacy group condemned the "massacre" carried out by Israel, stating that "the genocide must end".
- Former First Minister of Scotland, Humza Yousaf, wrote: "Bear witness to the images and ask yourself, are you on the right side of history?" after sharing the images of the incident.
- An image depicting tents in a camp arranged to spell out "All Eyes on Rafah", calling for people to pay attention to the offensive in the aftermath of the strike, went viral on social media, with many celebrities re-posting the image.
- In response to Netanyahu describing the attack as a "tragedy" and "mistake", Journalist Renee Graham said "mistake" and "accident" are words the Israeli leadership uses after every mass killing of civilians in Gaza.
- Following the attack, British Formula One racing driver Lewis Hamilton urged Israel to halt its offensive in Rafah, writing on Instagram that "Enough is enough. We cannot continue to watch this tragedy unfold and not speak up."
- Nobel Peace Prize winner Narges Mohammadi stated, "Images of children burning in refugee tents in Rafah starkly depict the decline of humanity in our world".
- Columbia University Apartheid Divest: Student protestors at Columbia briefly set up a third campus occupation during the university's alumni weekend, partially motivated by the attack, saying the administration was complicit in it.

== See also ==
- Attacks on Jabalia refugee camp (2023–present)
- Israeli attacks on Al-Maghazi refugee camp
- al-Shati refugee camp airstrikes
- Flour massacre
- May 2024 Al-Mawasi refugee camp attack
- Rafah paramedic massacre
- List of massacres in the Palestinian territories
- Israeli war crimes in the Gaza war
- List of accidents and incidents involving transport or storage of ammunition
- Sri Lankan civil war § Fighting in the 'No-Fire Zone'
