= Al-Mawasi, Rafah =

Al-Mawasi
- Municipality type D (Village council)

Arabic transcription(s)
  - Arabic: المواصي
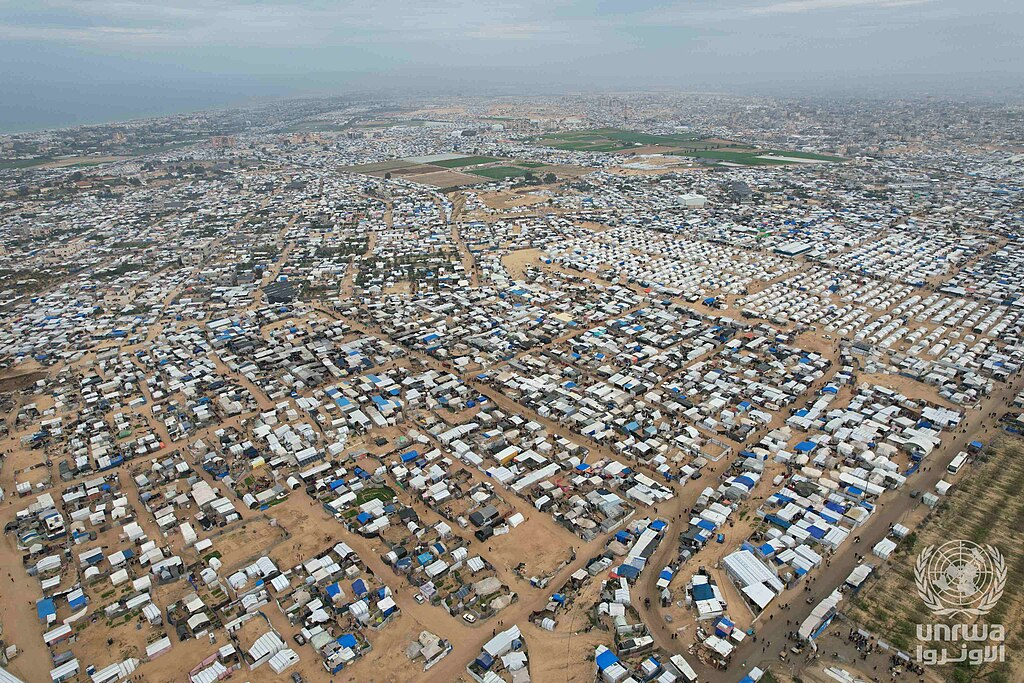
- An aerial view of the Al-Mawasi area where Palestinians displaced by the Gaza war live in tents, January 2025
- Interactive map of Al-Mawasi
- Coordinates: 31°19′44″N 34°13′48″E
- State: State of Palestine
- Governorate: Rafah

Government
  - Type: Village council

Population (2023)
  - Total: 9,000
  - Estimate (2025): 600,000

Al-Mawasi (Arabic: المواصي) is a fertile area for agriculture in the Gaza Strip. It is along the coast and has many sand dunes. Al-Mawasi is fourteen kilometers long and one kilometer wide, making up about 3% of the Gaza Strip. It is a Palestinian Bedouin town and prior to the 2005 unilateral Israeli disengagement from the Gaza Strip, it was a Palestinian enclave within the Israeli settlements of Gush Katif. Al-Mawasi had a population of 1,409 in the middle of 2006. Prior to the Gaza war, al-Mawasi had a population of 9,000. It has a number of buildings with a maximum of 100 structures.

== Region ==
The region's name derived from a traditional form of Palestinian dune agriculture, mawāṣī (مواصي). Al-Mawasi is known as the "Basket of Food" because of its fertile soil, underground water, and agricultural conditions.

== History ==
=== Gaza war (2023-present) ===
==== Designation as safe zone ====
In December 2023, during the Gaza war, the Israel Defense Forces had designated Al-Mawasi as one of the only safe areas in the Gaza Strip. Hundreds of thousands of people had fled there, and found only a barren strip of land with no basic resources such as food, water, or sanitation. In February 2024, as the IDF announced plans to expand operations into Rafah where hundreds of thousands had come to as a last refuge, Israeli authorities called Al-Mawasi a "safer zone". In an interview with Channel 4 News, Israeli spokesperson Eylon Levi, when pressed to confirm if civilians displaced northwards once more would be safe from further bombardment, stated that "it will not be safe" until Gaza was free from Hamas.

By late-August 2024, the United Nations estimated there were between 30,000 and 34,000 people per square kilometre in Al-Mawasi. Food and water grew scarce as the area became increasingly overcrowded.

==== Attacks ====
Al-Mawasi has been attacked numerous times during the war. The UN Human Rights Office has stated that "despite Al Mawasi, Khan Younis being declared a 'humanitarian zone' by the Israeli military, it continues to conduct airstrikes and shelling into the area.".

- On 26 December 2023, Israel bombed Al-Mawasi, killing one woman and saying it would not refrain from bombing safe zones.
- On 4 January 2024, Israeli bombings focused on al-Mawasi, killing 14 people from two families, mostly children under ten.
- On 15 January 2024, three displaced people sheltering in a tent were reported killed by an Israeli airstrike.
- On 23 January, Israeli warplanes reportedly bombed tents for displaced people.
- On 6 February, a woman was killed by an Israeli sniper.
- Two people were injured by Israeli gunfire on 24 February.
- On 10 March, at least 16 people were reported hospitalized following heavy Israeli bombardment.
- On 11 March 2024, Israeli shelling killed at least 14 people.
- The Gaza Health Ministry reported an Israeli air raid had killed 12 people sheltering in a tent.
- On 27 March 2024, children sheltering in a tent were reportedly killed.
- On 28 May 2024, two days after the Tel al-Sultan attack by Israel, in which 45 people were killed, Palestinian officials said Israel attacked al-Mawasi, killing 21 people including 12 women. Israel denied attacking the area. The New York Times published a video of the aftermath of the attack on Al-Mawasi.
- In mid-June 2024, witnesses stated they were evacuating al-Mawasi due to "unrelenting attacks" by the Israeli army.
- A late-June 2024 attack reportedly killed at least 25 people and wounded 50.
- On 13 July 2024, an Israeli airstrike on a displacement camp killed 90 people and wounded 300.
- On 16 July 2024, an Israeli airstrike killed at least 17 and wounded 26 in a tent area for displaced families in Al-Mawasi, according to the health ministry.
- On 28 July 2024, five people were killed by an Israeli airstrike on Al-Mawasi, according to the Gaza Civil Defence.
- On 21 August 2024, four farmers working near al-Mawasi were reportedly killed by Israeli tanks.
- On 10 September 2024, 40 people were killed and over 60 are injured in an Israeli airstrike on a displacement camp.
- On 13 September 2024, 19 people were killed in Israeli airstrikes.
- On 4 December 2024, at least 20 people were killed in an Israeli attack.
- On 16 April 2025, at least 16 people were killed and 23 others were injured by an Israeli airstrike, according to the spokesman of Gaza's civil defence agency, Mahmud Bassal.
- On 25 April 2025, a family of five, including three children were killed by Israeli forces.
- On 18 May 2025, at least 36 people were killed and more than 100 were injured when Israeli forces targeted a tent camp for displaced people.
- On 1 June 2025, the Israel Defense Forces struck al-Mawasi, with the Kuwaiti Field Hospital reporting one dead Palestinian and 30 wounded Palestinians due to that strike. The Israel Defense Forces, which regularly posts online operational updates, did not report this strike until questioned by the BBC, whereupon the Israel Defense Forces told the BBC that they had "wrongfully hit the Mawasi area" with artillery that "deviated" after "technical and operational errors".

== See also ==
- Agriculture in the State of Palestine
- May 2024 Al-Mawasi refugee camp attack
