= Sinwar family =

Palestinian political family affiliated with Hamas

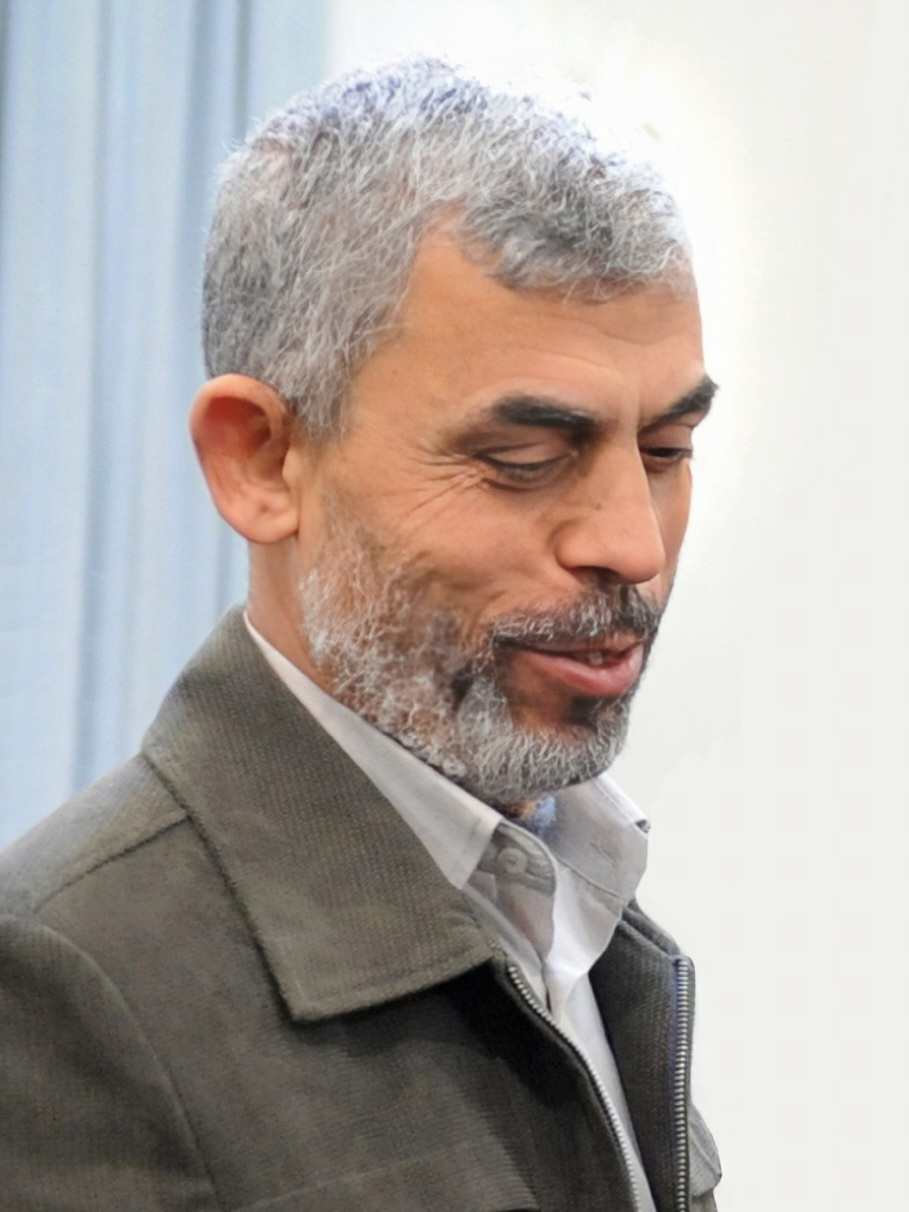
- Yahya Sinwar Mohammed Sinwar The Sinwar brothers
- Country: Hamas government in Gaza
- Place of origin: Village near Majdal
- Founded: Unknown
- Founder: Unknown
- Titles: List: State positions: Hamas leader in the Gaza Strip Prime Minister Defense Minister Party positions: Chairman of the Hamas Political Bureau Chairman of the Political Bureau in the Gaza Strip Party's armed wing positions: Commanders of the Izz al-Din al-Qassam Brigades Honorific titles: Hafiz
- Members: List: Unnamed father of Yahya, Mohammed and Zakaria Yahya Sinwar Samar Muhammad Abu Zamar Three children of Yahya Mohammed Sinwar Najwa Sinwar Three children Mohammed Zakaria Sinwar Three children of Zakaria
- Traditions: Sunni Islam

The Sinwar family is a political family which is affiliated with the Hamas. Members of the family ruled over the Hamas government in Gaza from 2017 until 2024 and again in 2025.

== History ==
The Sinwar family originally came from al-Majdal Asqalan, a town near present-day Ashkelon. During the 1948 Arab–Israeli War, the family was displaced from the town following its capture by Israeli forces and later settled in the Gaza Strip.

On 29 October 1962, Yahya Sinwar was born in the Khan Yunis refugee camp in the Gaza Strip, which was then under the control of the United Arab Republic. His brother Mohammed Sinwar was born on 16 September 1975 in the Khan Yunis refugee camp in the Gaza Strip, which was then under the control of the State of Israel.

=== Early activities of the Sinwar brothers ===
Yahya Sinwar and Rawhi Mushtaha co-founded the Munazzamat al Jihad w'al-Dawa (Majd), which in 1987 became the Hamas "police".

Mohammed Sinwar joined the Hamas in 1991. His rank in the group rose over time, and he eventually became one of its joint chief of staffs, where he became close to Hamas commanders such as Mohammed Deif and Sa'ad al-Arabid but also to deputy Hamas commander Marwan Issa.

=== Rise of the Sinwar brothers within Hamas ===
Yahya Sinwar was imprisoned in 1989, the second time he was arrested; the first time was in 1982. Hamas elects its leaders democratically within prison. Committees handle day-to-day decisions and punishments, while an elected "emir" and a high council oversee operations for limited terms. Yahya Sinwar alternated as emir with Rawhi Mushtaha, a confidant, during his imprisonment, serving as emir in 2004. Despite his leadership among prisoners, Sinwar was seen as a humble ascetic who shared cooking duties and other chores with junior inmates as well as making knafeh for fellow prisoners, in order to foster camaraderie.

Mohammad Sinwar In 2005, he became the commander of Hamas's Khan Yunis Brigade—a role he held until 2016, according to the IDF. Mohamed Sinwar operated alongside senior commanders such as Hassan Salameh, and accumulated experience and influence because he was able to stay under the radar. In 2006, Sinwar oversaw the establishment of Hamas's "Shadow Unit" with approval from Deif. It was an elite, covert force that guarded valuable captives, including Shalit. Sinwar personally selected militants from Khan Yunis to command the unit, including field commanders Rahman al-Mubasher, Khaled Abu Bakra, and Mohammed Dawoud.

=== Since the Gaza Strip came under the control of the Hamas ===
In 2011 Yahya Sinwar was exchanged in a prisoners exchange with Israel, afterwards he was appointed as Defense Minister of the Hamas government in Gaza, a quasi-state and rival government in the Gaza Strip which was established in June 2007 during the Battle of Gaza in 2007. One month after his release he also married Samar Muhammad Abu Zamar. In 2017 Yahya Sinwar was elected as Chairman of the Political Bureau in the Gaza Strip and replaced Ismail Haniyeh on 13 February 2017, the Chairman of the Political Bureau in the Gaza Strip, was between 2007 and 2024 also the Hamas leader in the Gaza Strip, the de facto highest position in the Hamas government in Gaza. On the same day Yahya Sinwar also became Prime Minister of the Hamas government in Gaza, a position which he held until 2019. On 31 July 2024 Chairman of the Hamas Political Bureau Ismail Haniyeh was assassinated by Israel, Khaled Mashal became after the assassination from 31 July until 6 August 2024, the acting Chairman of the Hamas Political Bureau. Khaled Mashal was replaced with Yahya Sinwar on 6 August 2024, after he was elected as the new Chairman, besides that he still hold the offices of Chairman of the Political Bureau in the Gaza Strip and of Hamas leader in the Gaza Strip. Two months later on 16 October Yahya Sinwar was killed by the Israel Defense Forces. The Hamas temporary committee which was established on 31 July 2024, took over the leadership of the Hamas until a new the Chairman of the Hamas Political Bureau is elected. Khalil al-Hayya became the acting Chairman of the Political Bureau in the Gaza Strip, the office of Hamas leader in the Gaza Strip became vacant. Samar Muhammad Abu Zamar fled with her children to the Republic of Türkiye, where she remarried with a Hamas member.

Mohammed Sinwar became the successor of Mohammed Deif who was assassinated on 13 July 2024, as Commanders of the Izz al-Din al-Qassam Brigades on the 4 November 2024. On 13 January 2025, Mohammed Sinwar became the Hamas leader in the Gaza Strip, succeeding his brother Yahya Sinwar. His rule over the Gaza Strip didn't lasted long, on 13 May 2025 after only 120 days, Mohammad Sinwar was killed along Muhammad Shabana, the Commander of the Rafah Brigade, a brigade of the Al-Qassam Brigades.

Zakaria Sinwar, the brother of Yahya Sinwar and Mohammed Sinwar was killed on 17 May 2025, about his early life there is limit information it is only known that he had a doctor title and that he had worked as a lecturer at the Islamic University in Gaza.

== Ideological influence ==
- Yahya Sinwar: Reportedly since 1982 influenced by Islamism.
- Mohammed Sinwar: He was ideologically influenced by Hamas co-founder Abdel Aziz al-Rantisi.

== Members ==
- Unnamed father of Yahya, Mohammed and Zakaria
- Yahya Sinwar
- Samar Muhammad Abu Zamar
- Three children of Yahya
- Mohammed Sinwar
- Najwa Sinwar
- Three children of Mohammed
- Zakaria Sinwar
- Three children of Zakaria

== See also ==
- Abu Shabab family
- Doghmush clan
- Hilles clan
