= Capital punishment in the Gaza Strip =

Capital punishment in the Gaza Strip has been enforced by multiple governments, militaries, and irregular militias throughout the area's history. A large proportion of the killings have been associated with broader violent conflicts. Many of the executions have been described as extrajudicial killings due to an incomplete or unaccountable court procedures.

According to Palestinian law, there are 77 crimes that are punishable by the death penalty. From 1994 to 2022, approximately 260 death sentences have been issued: around 230 in Gaza and 30 in the West Bank. In total, during this period, 41 executions were carried out, with the vast majority occurring in Gaza.

== Palestinian Authority (1995–2007) ==
The Palestinian Authority's State Security Court in Gaza (Arabic: محكمة أمن الدولة في غزة), which was formed in 1995, issued several death sentences against eight people, as follows: 3 in 1995, 3 in 1997, and 2 in 1999, all of which were in murder cases. Not all sentences were carried out.

== Hamas rule (2007–present) ==
From the Battle of Gaza (2007) until the Israeli invasion of the Gaza Strip, The Hamas movement had control of the interior of the Gaza Strip on the ground, but did not control the airspace, maritime borders, or land borders. Two parallel Palestinian judicial systems carried out executions in the Gaza Strip, civil and military. The judiciary of the Hamas-led civilian government and the military courts of the Ezzedeen al Qassam Brigades. The West Bank and Gaza Strip governments collaborate closely on issues such as health, but on other issues the Gaza Strip authorities act more autonomously. Palestinian law requires approval from the Palestinian National Authority president (currently Mahmoud Abbas) for the death penalty, but authorities in the Gaza Strip have disregarded this rule on multiple occasions.

=== 2014 Gaza war ===
During the 2014 Gaza War, Hamas executed more than 20 Palestinians in the Gaza Strip.

According to an Amnesty International report, 23 Palestinians were executed by Al-Qassam in the course of the 2014 conflict, and 16 of those people had been in prison since before the war began. Some were on trial for espionage, but those trials were suddenly cut short. From among the executed, 6 were killed by a firing squad outside a mosque in front of hundreds of spectators, including children. Amnesty claimed that Hamas used the cover of the war, which had a very heavy death toll, to carry out summary executions, to settle scores against opponents under the pretext they were collaborators with Israel. They were also accused of torture.

Most of these executions of alleged collaborators occurred in response to the IDF assassinating Muhammad Abu Shamala and Raed Attar, and the unsuccessful attempt to assassinate Mohammed Deif, which instead killed his 27-year-old wife, Widad, and his 7-month-old son Ali Deif. The following day, 18 of the suspected collaborators were executed by firing squad. The day after that, the body of Deif's 3-year-old daughter, Sarah, was recovered from the rubble of the same home.

=== 2015–2017 ===
The Palestinian Center for Human Rights reported in December 2015 that Hamas issued nine death sentences in 2015. Hamas had sentenced four Gazans to death during the first weeks of 2016, all on suspicion of spying.

In February 2016, Al Qassam claimed they had executed Mahmoud Rushdi Eshtewi (Arabic: محمود رشدي اشتيوي), (Note: Sometimes spelled "Mahmoud Ishtiwi".) one of the group's leading commanders, for very ambiguous reasons. Eshtewi was survived by his two widows and his three children. Most reliable sources at the time described the charges as unnamed or undefined. The stated reason was "for behavioral and moral violations to which he confessed" (Arabic: تجاوزاته السلوكية والأخلاقية التي أقر بها). Whatever it may refer to, the confession was probably obtained by torture. Before his death, his family had been told that the death penalty charge—treason (giving information to Israel that causes the deaths of Palestinians)—had been dropped. There is some suspicion that Eshtewi died in custody and was shot after death, from reports of people who saw his body before burial and thought the bullet wounds looked suspicious. The New York Times and other media from the USA interpreted the vague charges as a reference to a "homosexual relationship".

In May 2016, Hamas reportedly executed three men by firing squad and hanging. The execution was performed in the al-Katiba prison. The executed men were convicted for murder. Reportedly, the execution defied protests from the United Nations and "will likely" deepen tensions with the Palestinian government in the West Bank. Hamas defied an agreement with Fatah, the ruling party in the West Bank, by carrying out the executions without the approval of Palestinian President Mahmoud Abbas. Hamas later announced that 13 additional prisoners are to be executed.

In April 2017, it was reported that three Palestinians were executed by Hamas in Gaza Strip over alleged collaboration with Israel. Reportedly, the men were hanged at a Hamas police compound, as dozens of Hamas leaders and officials watched the killing.

=== 2022 ===
According to B'Tselem, Hamas courts handed down 13 death sentences in January-August 2022, but had not carried out any since 2017.

On 4 September 2022, Hamas announced they had executed five men, including two men condemned over collaboration with the occupation (Israel), and three others in criminal cases. A resident of Khan Younis born 1968 was convicted of supplying Israel in 1991 with “information on men of the resistance, their residence… and the location of rocket launchpads”; a second man, born 1978, was for supplying Israel in 2001 with intelligence “that led to the targeting and martyrdom of citizens” by Israeli forces, according to Hamas. The other three men had been convicted for murder.

=== 2025 ===
After the Gaza peace plan was implemented in October 2025, Hamas carried out executions of what they alleged were collaborators and criminals across the Gaza Strip, citing crime and security concerns. The first occurred on September 22, when three people accused of collaborating with Israel were shot. Reports indicate that 33 men were killed in total. Humanitarian organizations, including the Al-Mezan Center for Human Rights, condemned the killings as extrajudicial executions and called for accountability.

== Death sentences and executions in the Gaza Strip ==
Executed during	Person(s)		Detained	Death sentence		Execution		Sources
Executed during	Name or number	Age	Detained	Date	Charge(s)	Date	Method	Sources
2014 Gaza War	Ayman Taha				Treason (Egypt) (Note: Spying for Egypt.)	2014-08-04^{[disputed]} (Note: Israel claims he was executed by Hamas, but Hamas says he was killed in an Israeli airstrike months later, killing his entire family.)	Firing squad^{[disputed]}	
2014 Gaza War	25 or more people			summary executions	Treason (Israel) (Note: Collaborating with Israel.)	2014-08-21 to 24 August	Various (Note: Including some public executions.)	
2014 Gaza War	Atta Najjar				Treason	2014-08-22	Unknown	
	Mahmoud Eshtewi (also spelled "Ishtiwi")	34	January; 2015	Undisclosed	Undefined (Note: The stated reason was “for behavioral and moral violations to which he confessed” (Arabic: تجاوزاته السلوكية والأخلاقية التي أقر بها)) (see above)	2016-02-07	Firing squad^{[disputed]} (Note: Firing squad alleged by Al-Qassam, or prior death in custody alleged by others.)	
	3 people				Murder (3)	September; 2022		
	1 person (Note: Described only as a Khan Younis resident.)		1991		Treason (Israel) (Note: convicted of supplying Israel in 1991 with “information on men of the resistance, their residence… and the location of rocket launchpads”.)	September; 2022		
	1 person	44 (Note: born 1978)	2001 or after (Note: supplying Israel in 2001 with intelligence “that led to the targeting and martyrdom of citizens” by Israeli forces, according to Hamas.)		Treason (Israel)	September; 2022		
	5 people			2023-08-06	Treason (Note: Officially "collaboration with hostile entities" as defined by Article 131 of the 1979 Palestinian Revolutionary Penal Code.)	Sentenced to hanging. (Note: No reports of the sentence being implemented.)		

== Misinformation about executions in the Hamas-run Gaza Strip ==
Hamas' Al-Qassam Brigades militant wing have been credibly accused of numerous war crimes including various extrajudicial killings, but commonly told stories about executions in the Gaza Strip have been over simplified, exaggerated, distorted, or completely fabricated. For example, during the Gaza war, a video described as “Hamas executes people by throwing them off a roof of a building!” circulated on social media, but the video was from 2015 and not from Palestine. A July 2015 report from Al Arabiya, included identical images and stated that they were originally shared by the Islamic State, and showed the execution of four gay men in Fallujah, Iraq.

=== Allegations of capital punishment for homosexuality ===
Same sex sexual behaviour is not officially or typically a capital crime in the Gaza Strip. The only crimes that routinely attract the death penalty are treason and murder. No laws currently in place in the occupied Palestinian territory directly prohibit sex between consenting adult women. But there are differences between the Gaza Strip and West Bank governments regarding the legal status of sex between consenting adult men. The laws against homosexual behavior between men in Palestine that are currently in place in the Gaza Strip are a relic of British colonial rule in Mandatory Palestine. There is some ambiguity and debate about whether homosexuality was decriminalized in 1858, during the Ottoman period that preceded Mandatory Palestine. The British colonial laws that are currently on place in the Gaza Strip specify a maximum sentence of 10 or 14 years in prison. There is very little evidence that these laws are actually enforced in Gaza. Some interpretations of the laws say that it does not outlaw consensual gay sex between adults at all. In 2018, Anis. F. Kassim (editor-in-chief of the Palestinian Yearbook of International Law) said that Palestinian law (even in Gaza) could be interpreted as allowing non-commercial sex between consenting adult men.

== Criticism ==
Amnesty International released a report in August 2026 criticising extrajudicial executions of individuals believed to have collaborated with Israel, including a summary execution by the Al-Qassam Brigades and a planned execution of a suspected informant that had taken place in the months before the document was released. As part of its analysis, the organization also reviewed a group of nine extrajudicial executions that took place during the 2025 Hamas executions. Officials from Hamas described the actions as security measures necessary due to the lack of functioning civil institutions, including police and courts, since the start of the war in 2023.

== See also ==
- Capital punishment in Israel
- Extrajudicial killings by Hamas and Al Qassam

Human rights in Israel § Human rights in the occupied territories

- Human rights in Palestine § Capital punishment
- LGBT rights in Palestine and Pinkwashing (LGBTQ) § Israel
- Palestinian land laws
