= Mohammed Sinwar =

Hamas politician and militant (1975–2025)

- محمد السنوار
- An undated photo of Sinwar used by the IDF to announce that his assassination was successful

3rd Hamas leader in the Gaza Strip
- In office 13 January 2025 – 13 May 2025
- Prime Minister: Issam al-Da'alis (Note: After Issam al-Da'alis was killed on 18 March 2025 during the Gaza war, a 15-member Community Support Committee was established to assume government affairs.)
- Preceded by: Yahya Sinwar
- Succeeded by: Izz al-Din al-Haddad

7th Commander of the Izz al-Din al-Qassam Brigades
- In office 4 November 2024 – 13 May 2025
- Preceded by: Mohammed Deif
- Succeeded by: Izz al-Din al-Haddad

Personal details
- Born: Mohammed Ibrahim Hassan Sinwar; 16 September 1975 Khan Yunis refugee camp, Gaza Strip
- Died: 13 May 2025 (aged 49) Gaza European Hospital, Al-Fukhari, Khan Yunis, Gaza Strip
- Cause of death: Assassination by airstrike
- Relatives: Yahya Sinwar (brother); Sinwar family
- Nicknames: Abu Ibrahim (kunya); The Shadow

Military service
- Allegiance: Hamas
- Branch: Al-Qassam Brigades (Southern Camp faction)
- Service years: 1991–2025
- Rank: Commander
- Conflicts: First Intifada; Second Intifada; Gaza–Israel conflict; 2006 Gaza cross-border raid; Gaza War (2008–2009); 2012 Gaza War; 2014 Gaza War; 2021 Gaza War; Gaza war X; October 7 attacks

Mohammed Ibrahim Hassan al-Sinwar (Arabic: محمد إبراهيم حسن السنوار, romanized: Muḥammad Ibrāhīm Ḥasan as-Sinwār; 16 September 1975 – 13 May 2025) was a Palestinian militant who became the third Hamas leader in the Gaza Strip, following the killing of his brother, Yahya Sinwar in October 2024. He also served as the seventh commander of the Al-Qassam Brigades since November 2024. He held both positions until he was killed by the Israel Defense Forces (IDF) in May 2025.

Born in the Khan Yunis refugee camp, Sinwar spent several years in Israeli and Palestinian Authority jails in the 1990s and became the leader of Hamas's Khan Yunis Brigade in 2005. Israel attempted to assassinate him several times prior to killing him in May 2025.

== Early life ==
Mohammed Ibrahim Hassan Sinwar was born in the Khan Yunis refugee camp on 16 September 1975. Sinwar's family fled from Al-Majdal Asqalan (Ashkelon) during the 1948 Arab–Israeli War.

== Military career ==
Sinwar joined Hamas in 1991, becoming a member of its military wing, the Al-Qassam Brigades. He was ideologically influenced by Hamas co-founder Abdel Aziz al-Rantisi. His rank in the group rose over time, and he eventually became one of its joint chief of staffs, where he became close to Hamas commanders such as Mohammed Deif and Sa'ad al-Arabid—the latter was assassinated in 2003. He also became close to deputy Hamas commander Marwan Issa.

Sinwar partook in the First Intifada. Israel arrested him in 1991 and accused him of "terrorism", but released him nine months later from the Ktzi'ot Prison. In 1992, he was allegedly involved in an attempt to capture and kill an Israeli soldier (Alon Karavani), an operation led by Deif. He was arrested by the Palestinian Authority in Ramallah later in the 1990s, spending three years in jail before escaping in 2000.

During the Second Intifada, Sinwar planned attacks against Israeli targets and oversaw rocket attacks. In 2005, he became the commander of Hamas's Khan Yunis Brigade—a role he held until 2016, according to the IDF. He operated alongside senior commanders such as Hassan Salameh, and accumulated experience and influence because he was able to stay under the radar. Little was known about him by Israel's security services, and Arab officials said that he mostly operated "behind the scenes", giving him the nickname "Shadow".

Sinwar reportedly established ties with criminal clans, such as the Doghmush clan, facilitating the 2006 abduction of Israeli soldier Gilad Shalit. He was a part of the cell that conducted the abduction, being a key architect of the raid. He also played a key role in concealing Shalit, allegedly briefly holding the soldier captive himself. Shalit was exchanged in 2011 for 1,027 Palestinian prisoners, including Sinwar’s brother, Yahya Sinwar, with Mohammed insisting upon his release.

Sinwar reportedly convinced the al-Qaeda-aligned Ansar Bait al-Maqdis to join the Islamic State, which established the group's Sinai Province. Hamas provided the group with weapons and training in exchange for the group ensuring that arms shipments reached Gaza. He further gained influence after Raed al Atar and Muhammad Abu Shamaleh, who were candidates to replace Deif, were killed during the 2014 Gaza war.

In a 2022 interview with Al Jazeera, Sinwar said that the majority of Gaza's populace would not recognize him because he was so unknown. He had skipped his father's funeral to maintain secrecy. Also in the interview, speaking about past Israeli assassination attempts on him and the conflict with Israel, he stated, "For us, shooting rockets at Tel Aviv is easier than drinking water."

Mohammed Sinwar was believed by Israeli intelligence to have been one of the masterminds of the Hamas-led attack on Israel on 7 October 2023. Israel made him one of the most wanted men in its military operation in Gaza, placing a US$300,000 bounty on information as to his whereabouts. He was reportedly a close confidant of his brother Yahya Sinwar during the war. Israeli security officials said that cruelty was part of Sinwar's nature, and that he executed collaborators with Israel with his own hands.

=== Shadow Unit ===
Around three months after the abduction of Gilad Shalit in 2006, Sinwar oversaw the establishment of Hamas's "Shadow Unit" with approval from Deif. It was an elite, covert force that guarded valuable captives, including Shalit. Sinwar personally selected militants from Khan Yunis to command the unit, including field commanders Rahman al-Mubasher, Khaled Abu Bakra, and Mohammed Dawoud, who were all killed by Israel in 2013 and 2021. The unit was kept secret until Hamas released footage of Shalit in captivity in 2016.

Sinwar continued to recruit members to the unit and enhance its capabilities over time, with its purpose becoming more apparent after the taking of hostages during the October 7 attacks.

== Leadership of Hamas ==
Sinwar became the commander of the Al-Qassam Brigades after Deif was assassinated in July 2024. Later that year, he became the group's de facto overall leader in Gaza after his older brother, Yahya Sinwar, was killed by Israeli soldiers in October. Although Hamas officials in Doha established a temporary collective leadership committee, militants in Gaza decided to function independently under Sinwar.

Israeli officials viewed him as extreme as Yahya, yet more militarily experienced. Israeli and Arab officials characterized him as a roadblock in ceasefire negotiations, with Daniel Shapiro, the former United States ambassador to Israel, stating that, "There is little chance the war can end before he dies," and that, "His removal could open the door for the release of all hostages and beginning to move toward a post-war future for Gaza without Hamas." Sinwar was known for opposing compromises with Israel, and was against any agreement where Hamas would have to dismantle and disarm.

=== Strategy ===
Sinwar was a central figure in Hamas's recruitment efforts during the Gaza war. Although thousands of militants were killed by Israel, the destruction encouraged many Palestinians to join the group. His recruitment campaign and continued war effort posed a challenge to Israel, as it enabled the group to rebuild quicker than the IDF could destroy it, according to former IDF brigadier general Amir Avivi. Sinwar also recruited members into Hamas's "Arrow Unit", which was responsible for upholding social order in Gaza and cracking down on humanitarian aid looting.

Unexperienced recruits engaged in hit-and-run attacks against Israeli forces under Sinwar, fighting in small cells and using guns and anti-tank missiles that do not require any advanced skills. The recruits were promised food and aid for themselves and their families. Hamas fighters also utilized unexploded munitions dropped by Israel, particularly in northern Gaza.

== Failed assassination attempts ==
By May 2021, Sinwar had been subject to at least six assassination attempts by Israel within a span of 20 years.

During the Second Intifada, Sinwar was targeted in September 2000. He was later targeted in 2003, when an improvised explosive device was detonated in the wall of his house, although he was unharmed.

In 2006, an Israeli airstrike hit a vehicle believed to be carrying Sinwar, however he was not inside.

In 2008, Sinwar reportedly used pre-recorded radio transmissions to trick the IDF into thinking that he was speaking live from the signal location, leading the IDF to bomb the area, although Sinwar was never there.

Hamas announced that Sinwar had died in during the 2014 Gaza War and released an image purporting to show his body lying in a blood-stained bed. This was done to deter further assassination attempts against him. Israel believed that he had died until it discovered evidence of his survival nine years later. Sinwar had presumably been hiding in the tunnels underneath the Gaza Strip.

In 2019, Sinwar and other Hamas commanders, including Rafa Salama, were reportedly targeted in a plot where Israeli commandos would poison and kidnap them from a beach in Khan Yunis. The Al-Qassam Brigades rejected the report as "baseless".

During the 2021 Israel–Palestine crisis, Sinwar and Salama were lightly wounded following an Israeli airstrike on a tunnel that they were in. On 16 May that year, Israel bombed Sinwar's home, as well as his brother's, Yahya Sinwar, in Khan Yunis, but both were apparently unoccupied.

== Assassination ==
On 13 May 2025, the IDF and Shin Bet said that Sinwar had been targeted in an Israeli airstrike on a bunker under the Gaza European Hospital in Khan Yunis. The strike killed 26 people, according to the Gaza Health Ministry, but Sinwar's fate was initially unclear. According to the Saudi channel Al-Hadath, the bodies of Sinwar and Muhammad Shabana were recovered from the tunnel. Israeli defense minister Israel Katz said that "according to all the indications Muhammad Sinwar was eliminated." Senior Hamas official Osama Hamdan said that Hamas members in the Gaza Strip had told him that Sinwar was still alive, while the armed wing of Hamas did not confirm nor deny his death. On 28 May 2025, Israeli Prime Minister Benjamin Netanyahu said that Sinwar had been killed. On 31 May 2025, the IDF and Shin Bet confirmed that Sinwar had been killed. On 8 June 2025, the IDF said they found Sinwar's body in an "underground passageway beneath the European Hospital" in Khan Yunis. Hamas confirmed Sinwar's death on 30 August 2025, describing him as a "martyr" alongside a publicity photo. This was later affirmed in a speech by Abu Obeida, the spokesperson for the Qassam Brigades, which serves as the armed wing of Hamas.

== See also ==
- Marwan Issa
- Mohammed Deif
- Yahya Sinwar
