= Nili (unit) =

Israeli military task force

Nili (Hebrew: נִילי) is a task force established by Israel's Shin Bet and Mossad units in late 2023 to track and assassinate the members of Palestinian militant group Hamas, who organized and carried out the 2023 Hamas attack on Israel on 7 October 2023, which killed more than 1,200 Israelis, the majority civilians.

The unit is named after the World War I era espionage network of the same name, which is an acronym for "Netzah Yisrael Lo Yeshaker," (Hebrew: נצח ישראל לא ישקר) a Biblical phrase from the First Book of Samuel (1 Samuel 15:29) that translates to "the Eternal One of Israel will not lie".

== Organization and goals ==
The unit's ambitions are similar to Mossad assassinations following the Munich massacre, which tracked down and assassinated the Palestinian militant group, Black September, who organized and carried out the 1972 Munich massacre killing Israeli athletes.

The unit consists of representatives from both the Shin Bet and Mossad. Kidon operatives have been speculated to also participate in Nili. Whilst Nili's focus is primarily on Hamas's commando Nukhba unit, according to Ahron Bregman of King's College London, Mossad's involvement means that Nili will also go after Hamas members located outside of Gaza. According to a leaked recording, Ronen Bar the head of Shin Bet, told Israeli parliamentarians that Hamas leaders would be killed "in Gaza, in the West Bank, in Lebanon, in Turkey, in Qatar, everywhere...It will take a few years, but we will be there in order to do it."

“In the Middle East, revenge is an important part of the discourse. It is about how serious anyone in your environment sees you,” said Michael Milstein, a former senior Israeli military intelligence officer on Palestinian affairs. “Unfortunately this is the language of this neighborhood.”

The organization operates independently of other units, focusing on tracking Hamas strike cells and high-ranking Hamas officials. The personnel include both intelligence and operational staff.

The top targets for the unit included Marwan Issa and Yahya Sinwar, who orchestrated the 7 October 2023 attacks. Other high profile assassinations include Izz al-Din al-Haddad, Saleh al-Arouri and Ismail Haniyeh.

As of August 2026, Israel claims to have killed 2,800 people on Nili's list, which includes 1,200 who were killed during the initial onslaught. Another 300 are reported to have been captured.

== Criticism ==
Journalist and author on Israeli security services, Yossi Melman, criticized the campaign stating that the strategy of assassinations “doesn’t solve anything" and is an attempt by Israeli security services to redeem themselves after being humiliated by the success of Hamas attacks.

According to the Guardian, others have suggested that repeated claims by public figures about Nili illustrate a desire amongst Israeli officials to reassure a fearful public.

== See also ==
- Targeted killing by Israel
