= Deif family killings =

2014 airstrike in the Gaza Strip

- Part of the 2014 Gaza War
- Location: Gaza Strip, Palestine (the apartment where Mohammed Deif's wife and children lived)
- Date: 19 August 2014
- Target: Mohammed Deif (leader of the Ezzedeen Al-Qassam Brigades)
- Deaths: 6+
- Victims: 6, including Widad Asfura (the wife of Mohammed Deif) and two of their children
- Perpetrator: Israel Defense Forces
- Accused: Alleged informant: Mahmoud Ishtiwi (Note: Also spelled Mahmoud Eshtewi.)

On 19 August 2014, the Israel Defense Forces carried out an airstrike at the home of Mohammed Deif, leader of the Al-Qassam Brigades. Deif was unharmed, but his wife, Widad Asfura, and two of their children were killed.

== Background ==
Deif, born Mohammed Diab Ibrahim al-Masri, joined Hamas in 1987, weeks after its establishment during the First Intifada. He was arrested by Israeli authorities in 1989 for his involvement with the organization. After 16 months of detention, he was released in a prisoner exchange. Soon after his release, he helped establish the Ezzedeen Al-Qassam Brigades, the armed wing of Hamas. Deif became the head of the Qassam Brigades after Israel assassinated Salah Shehade in July 2002. Between July 2006 and November 2012, effective command was exercised by Deif's deputy, Ahmed Jabari, after Deif was seriously wounded in an Israeli assassination attempt.

Mohammed Deif married Widad Asfura (Arabic: وداد عصفورة, romanized: Widad Asfoura), sometimes referred to as Widad Deif, in 2007 or 2011. Widad was a widow (her previous husband had been a Qassami fighter who was killed). She and Deif had four children together, and Deif has two other sons, Bahaa (Arabic: بهاء) and Khaled (Arabic: خالد). Widad also had two sons from her late husband.

== Air strike ==
On 19 August 2014, Israel attempted to assassinate Deif in an airstrike on his house in the Sheikh Radwan district of Gaza City. The strike on the family home killed his 27-year old wife (Widad Asfoura) and two of their children, a 3-year-old daughter (Arabic: سارة محمد الضيف, romanized: Sarah Mohammed Al-Deif) (Note: Sometimes referred to as Sarah Mohamed Diab Al-Masry.) and 7-month-old son (referred to at the funeral as "Ali Deif" Arabic: علي الضيف), and three other members of the household. The strike also killed a mother and her two teenage sons from the Al Dalu family. The Palestinian Centre for Human Rights claimed it was the same house previously destroyed in 2012 which reportedly killed multiple members of the Al Dalu family.

The strike, however, did not kill Mohammed Deif. Israeli intelligence concluded in April 2015 that Deif had survived the assassination attempt, the fifth Israeli attempt to kill him.

On the same day, the IDF assassinated 3 other leaders: Muhammad Abu Shamala (aged 41), Raed al Atar (aged 40), and Muhammad Barhoum (aged 45).

== Funeral and public reaction in Gaza ==
Several thousand people attended the funeral of Deif's wife and son in Gaza, angrily demanding revenge against Israel and firing shots into the air. The bodies of Widad and Ali were taken from the wife’s family home to a mosque in Jabaliya refugee camp for prayers, then laid to rest in the sand of a cemetery.

Deif’s daughter, Arabic: سارة محمد الضيف, romanized: Sarah Mohammed Al-Deif, was not buried on the same day as her brother because her body was not recovered from the rubble until approximately midday on Thursday, the day after her brother's funeral, and two days after the air strike.

A letter describing the personal lives of Deif and his wife was published in Palestinian media. Israeli papers reported that Widad's mother did not regret approving of the marriage and had said she would do the same again.

== Israeli criticism of the attempted assassination ==
In addition to the rage in Gaza, some within Israel also criticised the strike. Gideon Levy, in his opinion piece "What Would Israel Do in Hamas' Shoes?" for Haaretz, asked how Israel would react if Hamas killed the wife and children of one of Israel's leaders. Levy also pointed out that even if the assassination had been successful, based on past successful strikes on Ahmad Yassin and others, Deif would have been replaced, and by someone more extreme.

== See also ==
- Casualties of Israeli attacks on the Gaza Strip
- AI-assisted targeting in the Gaza Strip
- Al-Dalu family killing
- 7 October attacks
- 2024 targeted assassination of Muhammad Deif
- Mahmoud Rushdi Ishtiwi
