= PK Gaza =

Parkour and freerunning team

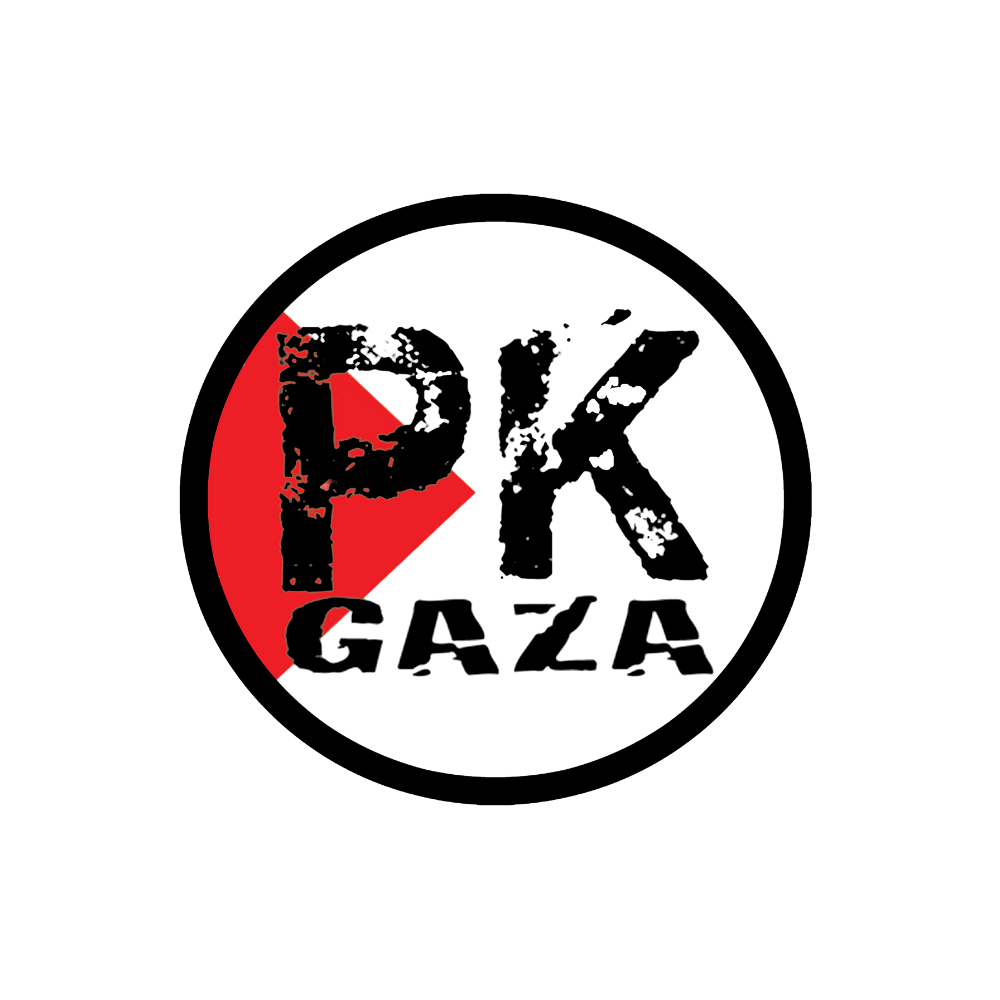
- Established: 2005
- Location: Gaza, Palestine
- Founders: Abdallah Inshasi and Mohammed Al-Jakhbir

PK Gaza (Gaza Parkour) is a parkour and freerunning team based in Gaza, Palestine. The team was established in 2005 by a group of young athletes who were introduced to parkour through online videos. Despite the constraints of living in a conflict zone, the team has continued their commitment to the sport. PK Gaza practices parkour as a way to navigate physical and psychological obstacles, promoting movement in a region where access and mobility are frequently restricted.

== History ==
In 2005, while living in Khan Yunis refugee camp, friends Mohammed Al-Jakhbir and Abdallah Inshasi, were introduced to parkour after watching parkour videos on YouTube. After that Ahmed Matar, Abdallab Al-Qassab, Jehad Abu-Sultan, Mousa Amer and others joined the team .

The team did not have access to parkour coaches, and taught themselves by watching videos online. They began training at various locations, including cemeteries and the ruins of bombed-out buildings, turning the destruction around them into arenas for their sport. They started to film their movements and published their videos online, the group slowly gained popularity.

Parkour allowed the athletes to express themselves, mentally escape from their surroundings, and inspire others.

PK Gaza were featured in the 2011 short film Free Running Gaza.
