= Yahya Sinwar =

Palestinian militant and politician (1962–2024)

- يحيى السنوار
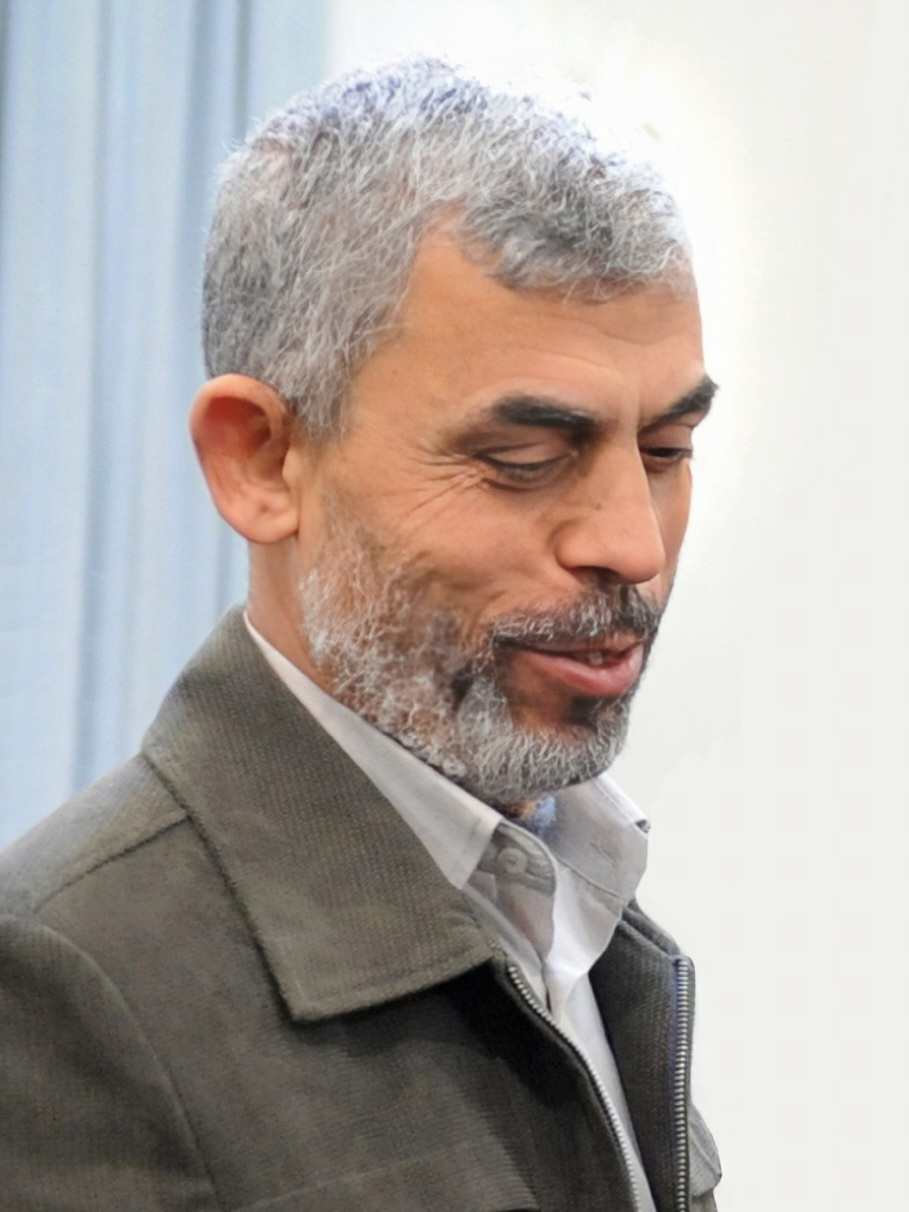
- Sinwar in 2012

4th Chairman of the Hamas Political Bureau
- In office 6 August – 16 October 2024
- Deputy: Khalil al-Hayya
- Preceded by: Ismail Haniyeh; Khaled Mashal (acting)
- Succeeded by: Khalil al-Hayya; Hamas temporary committee (Note: Consists of Khaled Mashal, Khalil al-Hayya, Zaher Jabarin, Muhammad Ismail Darwish, and an unnamed senior member of Hamas.) (acting)

2nd Hamas leader in the Gaza Strip
- In office 13 February 2017 – 16 October 2024
- Prime Minister: Mohammed Awad; Issam al-Da'alis
- Preceded by: Ismail Haniyeh
- Succeeded by: Mohammed Sinwar

5th Chairman of the Hamas Political Bureau in the Gaza Strip
- In office 13 February 2017 – 16 October 2024
- Preceded by: Ismail Haniyeh
- Succeeded by: Khalil al-Hayya (acting)

Personal details
- Born: Yahya Ibrahim Hassan Sinwar; 29 October 1962 Khan Yunis, Egyptian-ruled Gaza Strip
- Died: 16 October 2024 (aged 61) Tel al-Sultan, Rafah, Gaza Strip
- Cause of death: Killed in action
- Party: Hamas
- Spouse: Samar Muhammad Abu Zamar (m. 2011)
- Children: 3
- Relatives: Mohammed Sinwar (brother); Sinwar family
- Education: Islamic University of Gaza (BA)

Military service
- Allegiance: Hamas
- Branch: Al-Qassam Brigades (Southern Camp faction)
- Service years: 1987–2024
- Conflicts: First Intifada; 2021 Israel–Palestine crisis; Gaza war; October 7 attacks; Rafah offensive †

Yahya Ibrahim Hassan Sinwar (Note: Arabic: يحيى إبراهيم حسن السنوار, romanized: Yaḥyā Ibrāhīm Ḥasan as-Sinwār. The name is sometimes transliterated as Yahya al-Sinwar, Yehya al-Sinwar, Yehya Sinwar, Yehia Sinwar, or Yehiyeh Sinwar.) (29 October 1962 – 16 October 2024) was a Palestinian politician and militant. He served as the fourth chairman of the Hamas Political Bureau from August 2024, and as the second leader of Hamas in the Gaza Strip from February 2017. He succeeded Ismail Haniyeh in both roles.

Sinwar was born in the Khan Yunis refugee camp in Egyptian-occupied Gaza in 1962 to a family who had been expelled or fled from Majdal 'Asqalan during the 1948 Palestine War. He finished his studies at the Islamic University of Gaza, where he received a bachelor's degree in Arabic studies. In 1989, Sinwar was sentenced to four life sentences in Israel for orchestrating the abduction and killing of two Israeli soldiers and four Palestinians he considered to be collaborators. He spent 22 years in prison until his release among 1,026 others in a 2011 prisoner exchange for Israeli soldier Gilad Shalit. During his time in prison, Sinwar continued to coordinate the military activities of Hamas. Sinwar was one of the co-founders of the security apparatus of Hamas.

In 2017, Sinwar was elected as the leader of Hamas in Gaza and claimed to pursue "peaceful, popular resistance" the following year, supporting the 2018–2019 Gaza border protests, though he was also reported to have been dedicated to eradicating Israel and was said to have seen military confrontation as the only path to "liberating Palestine", saying that this would be achieved "by force, not negotiations". He also developed strong ties with Iran. Re-elected as Hamas leader in 2021, Sinwar survived an assassination attempt by Israel that same year. He was widely regarded as the mastermind behind the October 7 attacks in 2023, which was followed by the Gaza war that spilled over to other parts of the Middle East. He was killed in a clash with the Israel Defense Forces in October 2024.

In September 2015 Sinwar was specifically designated a terrorist by the United States government. In May 2024, Karim Khan, the prosecutor of the International Criminal Court, announced his intention to apply for an arrest warrant for Sinwar for war crimes and crimes against humanity, as part of the ICC investigation in Palestine.

== Early life and education ==
Yahya Ibrahim Hassan al-Sinwar was born on 29 October 1962, in the Khan Yunis refugee camp, when the Gaza Strip was under Egyptian occupation, where he spent his early years. His family were forcibly expelled from Majdal Asqalan (Arabic: مدينة المجدل, romanized: Medīnat al-Majdal), now known as Ashkelon, during the Nakba, and sought refuge in the Gaza Strip. Sinwar, discussing his refugee upbringing, tied it to his Hamas involvement in conversations with fellow prisoners during his later imprisonment. He "is said to have continually told his cellmates that Israel had to be defeated so that his family could return to its village." According to Esmat Mansour, another inmate, Sinwar was deeply affected by the communal living conditions and food distribution in the refugee camp. After he graduated from high school at Khan Yunis Secondary School for Boys, he went on to the Islamic University of Gaza, where he received a bachelor's degree in Arabic studies. His younger brother is Mohammed Sinwar, a military leader of Hamas. Sinwar was a hafiz (a title given to those who have completely memorized the Quran).

== Early activities and imprisonment ==
Sinwar was first arrested in 1982 for subversive activities and he served several months in the Far'a prison where he met other Palestinian activists, including Salah Shehade, and dedicated himself to the Palestinian cause. Arrested again in 1985, upon his release he co-founded with Rawhi Mushtaha the Munazzamat al Jihad w'al-Dawa (Majd), an organization that worked, among others, to identify collaborators with Israel among the Palestinian population, which in 1987 became the Hamas "police". Sinwar's killing of suspected collaborators with Israel gained him the nickname "The Butcher of Khan Younis".

When asked about this nickname in The New Yorker's August 2024 profile on Sinwar, Basem Naim, a member of Hamas's leadership, said: "I think this is nonsense. That is the first time I have ever heard this." He and other Hamas leaders and supporters added that "Israelis require a great villain" and made one out of Sinwar for this reason. Academic expert on Hamas Khaled Hroub said Sinwar is "widely respected as a great organizer", and that claims of his alleged ruthlessness had not been proved. "Before October 7th, I hadn't heard all these terrible stories", Hroub said, adding: "I think some of these stories came about to complete this image of Sinwar the villain. He is decisive, that is true, and maybe people started to extrapolate from that and spice it up."

In 1988, Sinwar planned the abduction and killing of two Israeli soldiers and the murder of four Palestinians whom he suspected of cooperating with Israel. He was arrested on February that year; during questioning he admitted to strangling one of the victims with his bare hands, suffocating another with a keffiyeh, shooting a third and choking and punching a fourth. He was sentenced to four life sentences in 1989. Sinwar regarded extracting confessions from collaborators as a righteous obligation. He told interrogators that one of them had even said "he realized he deserved to die." Sinwar persisted in targeting informants while in prison. Israeli authorities suspected him of ordering the beheadings of two suspected informants. Hamas operatives reportedly disposed of the victims' severed body parts by throwing them out of cell doors and telling guards to "take the dog's head."

Gershon Baskin, an Israeli peace activist who has long been involved in prisoner-exchange negotiations and talks with Hamas leaders, cautioned that "All these Israeli experts and Shin Bet people and interrogators will tell you that they know exactly what Sinwar knows and believes. But they can't know. The dynamic of a meeting with someone who is your prisoner is obviously fraught."

Sinwar, respected for his resourcefulness among fellow inmates, attempted multiple escapes, including digging a hole in his cell floor to tunnel under the prison. He collaborated with Hamas leaders outside, smuggling cellphones into the prison and using visitors to relay messages. These often involved planning to kidnap Israeli soldiers for prisoner exchange. Years later, Sinwar would say, "for the prisoner, capturing an Israeli soldier is the best news in the universe, because he knows that a glimmer of hope has been opened for him."

Sinwar's time in prison was transformative, shaping his leadership qualities, according to Ghazi Hamad, a senior Hamas official. Sinwar also mastered Hebrew through an online program and extensively studied Israeli news to comprehend his adversary better. He meticulously translated Hebrew autobiographies of former Shin Bet chiefs into Arabic, sharing them with fellow inmates to study counterterrorism tactics. He referred to himself as a "specialist in the Jewish people's history". Sinwar once remarked to supporters: "They wanted prison to be a grave for us, a mill to grind our will, determination and bodies. But, thank God, with our belief in our cause we turned the prison into sanctuaries of worship and academies for study." Ma'ariv reported that during his time in prison, Sinwar enrolled in fifteen courses through the Open University of Israel over a span of seven years, beginning in 1995. Most were in history, covering topics such as the history of the Jews in the Second Temple and Rabbinic periods, the First Temple period, The Holocaust, and Zionism, along with a political science course on governance and Israeli democracy.

Hamas elects its leaders democratically within prison. Committees handle day-to-day decisions and punishments, while an elected "emir" and a high council oversee operations for limited terms. Sinwar alternated as emir with Rawhi Mushtaha, a confidant, during his imprisonment, serving as emir in 2004. Despite his leadership among prisoners, Sinwar was seen as a humble ascetic who shared cooking duties and other chores with junior inmates as well as making knafeh for fellow prisoners, in order to foster camaraderie.

In 2004, Sinwar, displaying symptoms like standing for prayer then falling and drifting in and out of consciousness, complained of neck pain. A prison dentist, Yuval Bitton, suspected a brain issue, possibly a stroke or abscess, urging urgent hospitalization. At Soroka Medical Center, Israeli surgeons removed a brain tumor that would have been fatal. Bitton emphasized that without surgery, the tumor would have burst. He recounts that a few days later, he visited Sinwar in the hospital with a prison officer. Sinwar asked the Muslim officer guarding him to thank the dentist and to explain to him the significance of his life-saving surgery in Islam and how he felt indebted to him for saving his life. Sinwar rarely interacted with Israeli prison authorities, but he began regular meetings with the dentist. Their discussions, unlike the dentist's usual chats with inmates, solely concerned Hamas ideology. Sinwar, who knew the Qu'ran by heart, articulated Hamas' beliefs, emphasizing its religious stance on the land. He dismissed the possibility of a two-state solution, asserting the land belonged to Muslims.

In a search of Sinwar's cell, guards confiscated a handwritten novel he completed at the end of 2004. The book, titled The Thorn and the Carnation, mirrored his life and the Palestinian resistance. The story revolves around Ahmed, a devout Gazan boy, navigating life under Israeli occupation during the 1967 Arab-Israeli war. At least one copy was smuggled out, and a typed PDF was found in an online library by The New York Times. A different translation of the book title Al-Shawk wa’l Qurunful by a source well-versed in Arabic is Thorns and Carnations.

Sinwar's sole interview with an Israeli television outlet in 2005 saw him warning Israelis to "be scared" of Hamas's election victory. However, he privately conveyed that much depended on the Israeli government's actions. He said that, essentially, Hamas did not have maximalist aims and instead was seeking rights from the Israeli leadership. (Note: "From our perspective, we have a right that we’re asking from the Israeli leadership," he said. "We aren’t asking for the town.")

Sinwar played a pivotal role in the negotiations for Gilad Shalit's release. Despite being part of the negotiation team, Sinwar opposed deals that did not include high-profile prisoners, known as "the impossibles", such as those serving multiple life sentences. Even after negotiations secured the release of over a thousand prisoners, including some high-profile ones, Sinwar remained adamant. This stance led to a rift in Hamas leadership, with Saleh al-Arouri, another prominent Hamas figure, recognizing the need for compromise. Despite efforts to persuade Sinwar, he persisted, even attempting to orchestrate a hunger strike involving 1,600 Hamas prisoners. His unwavering principles and refusal to compromise complicated negotiations. Eventually, Sinwar's authority waned as other Hamas leaders negotiated a deal without him, as Israeli authorities had put him in solitary confinement until the deal was reached. He was the most senior Palestinian prisoner released to Gaza among 1,026 others in the 2011 prisoner exchange for the soldier. In an interview with Hamas's Al-Aqsa TV, he expressed determination to continue efforts to free more prisoners, urging the Al-Qassam Brigades to kidnap soldiers for exchanges.

Following his release from prison, Sinwar was elected to a role within Hamas akin to defense minister.

In November 2012, during the 2012 Israeli operation in the Gaza Strip, Sinwar met Iranian Revolutionary Guard Corps Quds Force General Qasem Soleimani in Tehran and after his 2017 election as the group's leader in Gaza he cultivated closer cooperation between Hamas, Hezbollah and Iran.

=== Torture of Mahmoud Ishtiwi ===
Sinwar was the political representative of the Qassam Brigades when the Brigades' Zeitoun Battalion commander Mahmoud Ishtiwi was accused of embezzlement and other "moral violations". Hamas believed that fear of having these violations revealed led to him giving Israel information that ultimately contributed to the deaths of Mohammed Deif's wife Widad Asfura and their two children when their home was bombed by Israel in August 2014. Ishtiwi was reportedly whipped, suspended from a ceiling for hours across multiple days, and ultimately killed by being shot with three bullets to the chest.

== Leadership of Hamas in the Gaza Strip (2017–2024) ==
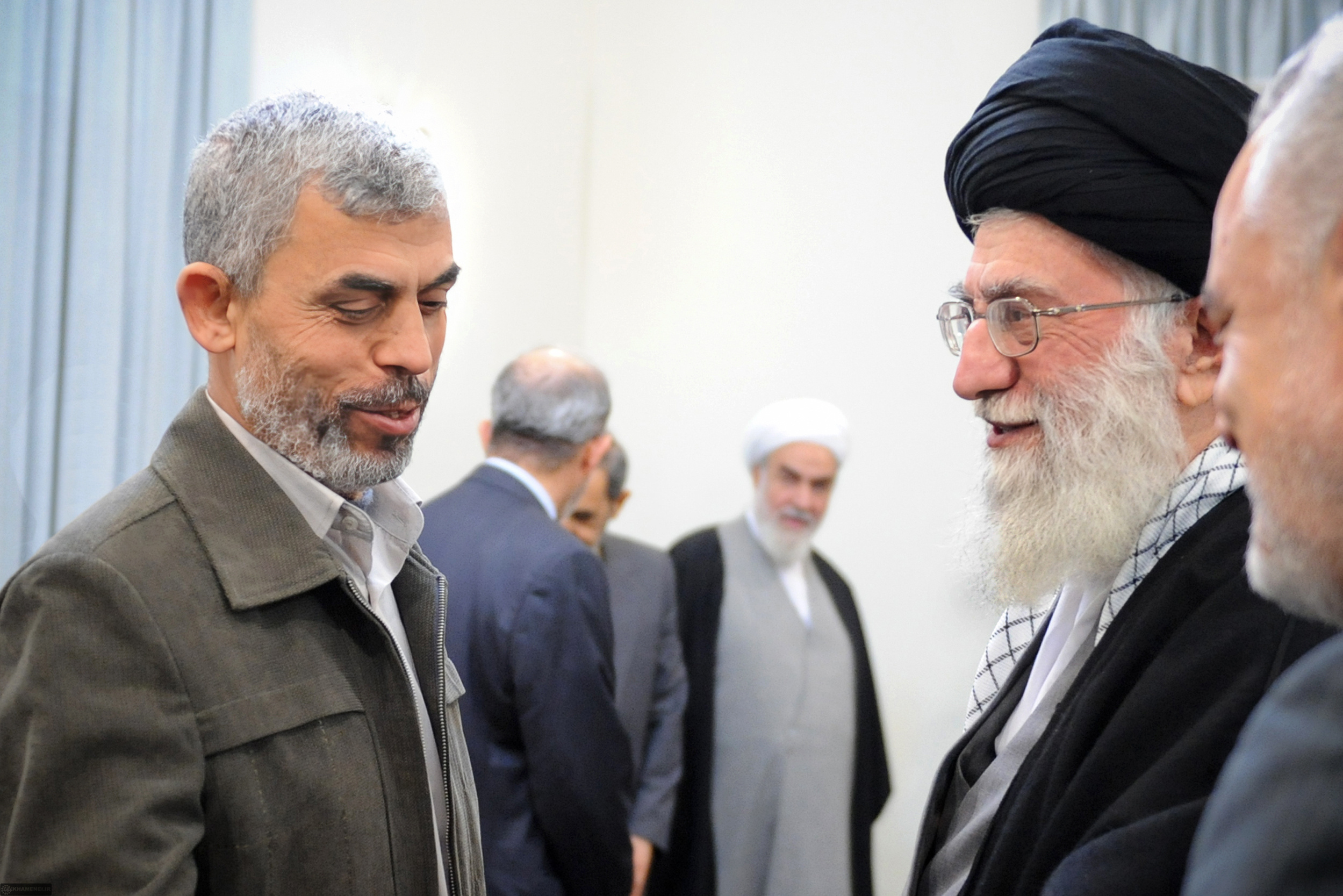
Sinwar with Iranian Supreme Leader Ali Khamenei, February 2012

In February 2017, Sinwar was secretly elected the leader of Hamas in the Gaza Strip, taking over from Ismail Haniyeh. In March, he established a Hamas-controlled administrative committee for the Gaza Strip, opposing power sharing with the Palestinian Authority in Ramallah. Sinwar elevated his former prison associates alongside him, with Rawhi Mushtaha serving as the head of Hamas's Gaza government, and Tawfiq Abu Naim helped him to establish an internal security force feared by locals. Sinwar rejected any reconciliation with Israel, and was said to have been dedicated to its eradication, seeing military confrontation as the only path to "liberating Palestine", and saying that this would be achieved "by force, not negotiations". Sinwar strengthened Hamas's military wing, and called on militants to capture more Israeli soldiers.

In September 2017, a new round of negotiations with the Palestinian Authority began in Egypt, and Sinwar agreed to dissolve the Hamas administrative committee for Gaza. He was said to have silenced hard-line voices in Gaza, ordering against the use of tunnels that Mohammed Deif wanted to use to sneak fighters into Israel before they were shut down by new classified Israeli technology in 2017. He continued to refuse to consider disarming Hamas, arguing that "over is the time Hamas spent discussing recognizing Israel. Now Hamas will discuss when we will wipe out Israel."

On 16 May 2018, in an unexpected announcement on Al Jazeera, Sinwar stated that Hamas would pursue "peaceful, popular resistance" to the Israeli occupation, opening the possibility that Hamas, which is considered a terrorist organisation by many countries, may play a role in negotiations with Israel. A week earlier he had encouraged Gazans to breach the Israeli siege and endorsed the Great March of Return, saying "We would rather die as martyrs than die out of oppression and humiliation," and adding, "We are ready to die, and tens of thousands will die with us."

In October 2018, Sinwar gave an interview to a journalist from la Repubblica explaining his desire for peace, stating "And I am not saying I won't fight anymore, indeed. I am saying that I don't want war anymore. I want the end of the siege. You walk to the beach at sunset, and you see all these teenagers on the shore chatting and wondering what the world looks like across the sea. What life looks like. It's breaking. And should break everybody. I want them free." The interview was met by incredulity from observers, who noted that Sinwar would later oversee combat operations against Israel and continued to preach violent rhetoric.

On 1 December 2020, Sinwar tested positive for COVID-19 and was reportedly following the advice of health authorities and taking precautionary measures. A spokesman for the group also said that he was in "good health and [...] pursuing his duties as usual".

In March 2021, Sinwar was elected to a second four-year term as the head of Hamas in Gaza. By that time, Sinwar had solidified his control over the territory, and eliminated veteran Hamas commanders. He started bypassing Hamas's influential Shura council and kept the Doha-based senior leadership partially uninformed about his activities.

On 15 May 2021, an Israeli airstrike was reported to have hit Sinwar's home; there were no immediate details of any deaths or injuries. The strike took place in the Khan Yunis region of southern Gaza in the midst of increasing tension between Israelis and Palestinians. In the week that followed, he appeared publicly at least four times. The most obvious was in a press conference on 27 May 2021. During the conference, Sinwar stated he would walk home from the venue and invited Benny Gantz, the Israeli Minister of Defense to order his assassination during his walk home. Sinwar spent the next hour in the streets of Gaza taking photos with the public.

According to a New York Times investigation, a memo dated August 24, 2022, written by Yahya Sinwar, called for bulldozers to breach the Gaza-Israel fence and multiple assault waves. It urged "Stomp on the heads of soldiers" and listed "opening fire on soldiers at point-blank range, slaughtering some of them with knives, blowing up tanks," and ordered setting residential areas on fire with gasoline or diesel. Unit commanders were told to film and broadcast the acts to mobilize Palestinians in the West Bank and Arabs in Israel.

In the autumn of 2022, Hamas began planning a surprise attack on Israel. Sinwar sought to convince Iran and Hezbollah to participate in the attack or in a broader conflict with Israel, aiming to cause its 'collapse'. During one meeting, Sinwar acknowledged that such an attack would likely require sacrifices, probably referring to the people of Gaza. In September 2022, he reviewed the battle plans, though the attack was postponed. By May 2023, Sinwar and his colleagues were relieved to have avoided a minor confrontation during Ramadan, intending to preserve the element of surprise for the 7 October attack.

=== Israel–Gaza war ===
Sinwar and Mohammed Deif were regarded as the masterminds behind the October 7 attacks in 2023, the deadliest attack in Israeli history. The attack left around 1,200 people dead and about 240 taken as hostages in Gaza. Following the attack, Sinwar was put under EU terrorist sanctions and became a top target for assassination by the Israeli security services.

=== Hiding strategies ===
Israeli intelligence presumed Sinwar was hiding in a complex system of tunnels beneath Gaza and was surrounded by hostages acting as human shields. According to Israeli officials, Sinwar constructed an underground fortress in his hometown of Khan Yunis, from where he continued to coordinate attacks. IDF spokesperson noted that Israeli forces had come close to capturing him on multiple occasions during the war, but he consistently managed to evade them, primarily hiding underground between Khan Yunis and Rafah.

After three weeks of conflict in the Gaza war, Sinwar proposed the release of all Palestinian prisoners in Israeli confinement in exchange for the release of all the hostages kidnapped in the conflict. Sinwar reportedly visited the hostages in the early days of the war promising they would not be harmed. When one of the hostages, Yocheved Lifshitz, said Sinwar should be ashamed of himself, he was silent.

During subsequent cease-fire talks, Sinwar urged other Hamas leaders to refuse concessions. He said that high civilian casualties and the suffering of civilians in Gaza led to international pressure on Israel giving Hamas the upper hand in negotiations.

On 7 November, after Israel surrounded Gaza City, it claimed it had trapped Sinwar in a bunker there. Israeli military authorities later claimed he was in Khan Yunis in an underground bunker. Israeli Defence Minister Yoav Gallant said: "We will get to Yahya Sinwar and eliminate him. If the residents of Gaza get there ahead of us, that will shorten the war." Leaflets allegedly dropped by Israel into Gaza proclaimed a bounty of $400,000 for providing information on Sinwar's location. According to Reuters, Israel demanded the exile of Sinwar, Deif, and four other Hamas leaders from Gaza as a condition for a ceasefire.

By February 2024 the IDF believed that Sinwar had moved to Rafah from Khan Younis. According to the IDF, Sinwar was constantly on the move and thus was unable to personally command Hamas forces. On 13 February the IDF released CCTV footage dated 10 October showing Sinwar and his wife and children as well as his brother Ibrahim in a Hamas tunnel complex in Khan Younis. The IDF stated that they were collecting intelligence and interrogating Hamas commanders and their relatives to find Sinwar.

On 20 May 2024, Karim Khan, the prosecutor of the International Criminal Court, announced his intention to apply for an arrest warrant for Sinwar for war crimes and crimes against humanity, as part of the ICC investigation in Palestine.

In June 2024, The Wall Street Journal published what it said were leaked communications between Sinwar and Hamas' leadership, in which Sinwar claimed to "have the Israelis right where we want them" and suggested that Palestinian civilian deaths were "necessary sacrifices" that would "infuse life into the veins of this nation, prompting it to rise to its glory and honour". Ghazi Hamad, a Hamas spokesperson, denied the report, stating that Sinwar never made such comments and was instead focused on ending the conflict swiftly, calling the circulated statements "completely incorrect".

On 3 September 2024, the U.S. Department of Justice announced criminal charges against Sinwar for his role in the 7 October attack on Israel. The charges, which were filed under seal in February 2024, include conspiracy to provide material support to a foreign terrorist organization and conspiracy to murder U.S. nationals.

== Chairman of the Hamas Political Bureau (2024) ==
Following the assassination of Ismail Haniyeh on 31 July 2024, Hamas named Yahya Sinwar as the new "overall leader" of the movement, as well as the new chairman of the Hamas Political Bureau. The announcement came after the Shura Council, the body that elects Hamas's politburo, voted unanimously to choose Sinwar as the new leader, in what was described by a Hamas official as a "message of defiance to Israel". He held this position for over 2 months until his own death on 16 October 2024.

According to the BBC, Yahya Sinwar's election as the leader of Hamas "signalled the end of an era and the beginning of a new, more extreme phase". Per Hamas officials, he was elected due to his considerable popularity in the Arab and Islamic worlds following the October 7 attacks and his strong connections with the "Axis of Resistance", a network of armed groups led by Iran. According to The Wall Street Journal, his election suggests that the movement endorsed his strategy of waging war against Israel in conjunction with Iran's militia allies, also noting that Sinwar had gained increasing popularity among Palestinians due to his approach in handling the conflict. The Economist report indicated that Sinwar's election made a ceasefire less likely as he represented Hamas's most extreme faction. His leadership consolidated Hamas's alignment with Iran and its resistance to diplomatic negotiations.

The IDF Military Intelligence Directorate announced in September that they had begun an investigation into Sinwar's possible death in an airstrike after noting that he had not been heard from for some time. Israel Hayom reported that Israeli authorities believed he was still alive, and lacked any direct evidence of his death, but were "exploring other scenarios". In October Sinwar re-established contact with the Hamas delegation in Qatar.

It is thought that Sinwar had spent a considerable period of time above ground despite the presence of Israeli forces, as his autopsy found no evidence of significant health deterioration that could be attributed to spending excessive amounts of time underground. Yahya Sinwar carried out most of his military operations in Rafah, where he would conceal his face with a blanket to avoid detection, sometimes planning attacks in the vicinity of Israeli soldiers or within homes that previously had presence of Israeli soldiers.

According to The Wall Street Journal, Sinwar was offered an opportunity to leave Gaza for Egypt in exchange for allowing Egypt to negotiate ceasefire on behalf of Hamas. Sinwar refused, telling Arab mediators that he was on "Palestinian soil". Sinwar recommended that, in case of his death, Hamas appoint a council of leaders to govern and manage the transition following his death.

== Death ==
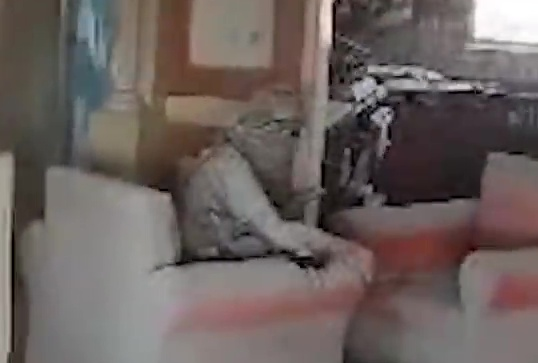
Sinwar, wounded, staring at an Israeli drone, with his face covered in a keffiyeh, shortly before he was killed

On 17 October 2024, the Israel Defense Forces and Shin Bet said they were looking into whether Sinwar was among three individuals killed in an operation in Gaza the previous day, though neither Israel nor Hamas officially confirmed his death at that time. The next day, it was reported that IDF soldiers investigating a strike on Hamas members had found a body with a striking resemblance to Sinwar, and that a DNA sample had been collected from it. Sinwar's body was found dressed in military fatigues and a kuffiyeh, and grasping an AK-47. Among other items found on his person were 40,000 NIS in cash, a lighter, and a number of identity documents. According to Kan radio, his associates were found with cash, weapons and false identification documents. Chen Kugel, an Israeli pathologist, reported that Sinwar sustained injuries to his right forearm from missile fire, his left leg from "fallen masonry", and his body from shrapnel, before being shot in the head, resulting in his death from "severe traumatic brain injury".

The IDF confirmed through DNA analysis that Sinwar had been killed a day earlier in Gaza during a firefight with the IDF. Israel Police said in a statement that the body matched Sinwar's dental records and fingerprints. Prime Minister Benjamin Netanyahu stated that the killing of Sinwar "is not the end of the war in Gaza," but he said that Sinwar's death marked the beginning of a new era without Hamas's rule over Gaza. Hamas confirmed Sinwar's death on 18 October. On 2 November, sources close to Hamas told the pan-Arab newspaper Asharq Al-Awsat that "shortly before his death, Sinwar and those with him suffered from limited access to food, especially during the last three days when they did not eat at all. They were preparing for a confrontation with Israeli forces, which led them to move between several damaged neighboring buildings, shifting from one to another."

== Personal life ==
On 21 November 2011, Sinwar married Samar Muhammad Abu Zamar. The couple had three children. Sinwar's wife received a master's degree in theology from the Islamic University of Gaza. According to sources, after being widowed, Samar and the children left the Gaza Strip for Turkey.

== Bibliography ==
- Sinwar, Yahya (2004). The Thorn and the Carnation. Algiers: TASQ Company. ISBN 9798224053018. OCLC 1458995464. (Note: Arabic: Al-Shawk wa'l Qurunful or Shawk wa Qurunful.) Novel; two volumes. (Draft2digital edition: ISBN 9781445766720.)

== See also ==
- List of leaders of Hamas
- Gaza genocide
- Mohammed Deif
- Mohammed Sinwar
