= Rawhi Mushtaha =

Palestinian Hamas militant (died 2024)

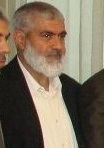
Mushtaha in 2013

Rouhi Jamal Abdel Ghani Mushtaha (Arabic: روحي مشتهى; 1959–2024) was a Palestinian militant was the de facto prime minister of the Gaza Strip at the time of his death. He was a founding member of the Al-Qassam Brigades.

== Early life ==
Rouhi Jamal Abdel Ghani Mushtaha was born in the Shuja'iyya neighborhood of Gaza City in 1959, to a family that originally came from Beersheba. Mushtaha joined Hamas in 1987. Israel arrested Mushtaha on 13 February 1988, and sentenced him to 124 years in prison. While in prison he and Yahya Sinwar were elected to the prisoners' representative body by other Hamas prisoners. Mushtaha was among 1,024 prisoners released in exchange for Israeli soldier Gilad Shalit in 2011.

== Career ==
Mushtaha was elected to the politburo of Hamas in 2012, 2017, and 2021. He helped establish the Al-Qassam Brigades. The United States Department of State placed Mushtaha on the list of specially declared global terrorists, along with Muhammad Deif and Yahya Sinwar, on 8 September 2015. He was Hamas' representative to the Egyptian intelligence service and resided in Egypt for years.

Mushtaha was the de facto prime minister of the Gaza Strip.

== Personal life ==
Mushtaha married Raeda Omjamal in 1988, two months before his arrest. Four months into his imprisonment he told his wife that she should divorce him, but she declined to do so. Mushtaha's house was bombed during the 2014 Gaza War.

On 3 October 2024, the Israel Defense Forces announced that Mushtaha was killed by an airstrike conducted by the IDF three months prior. His death was confirmed by Hamas in 2025. He and Sami Muhammad Awda were buried at the ruins of the Great Mosque of Gaza on 24 January 2025.

== Works cited ==
=== News ===
- «صائد العملاء» في «حماس»... مَن هو روحي مشتهى الذي أعلنت إسرائيل مقتله؟ [Hamas's "spy hunter"... Who is Rouhi Mushtaha, whose death was announced by Israel?]. Asharq Al-Awsat (in Arabic). 3 October 2024. Archived from the original on 4 November 2026.
- الشهيد روحي مشتهى قيادي في حماس أمضى ربع قرن بسجون الاحتلال [Martyr Rouhi Mushtaha, a Hamas leader, spent a quarter of a century in the occupation's prisons.]. Al Jazeera Arabic (in Arabic). 26 January 2025. Archived from the original on 4 November 2026.
- "'Closest ally of Yahya Sinwar': Who is Rawhi Mushtaha Hamas leader killed by Israel in airstrike". The Times of India. 3 October 2024. Archived from the original on 25 August 2026.
- "Three Hamas leaders killed months ago, IDF says". BBC News. 22 April 2019. Archived from the original on 4 November 2026.
- Dalloul, Motasem (13 February 2017). "The new leader of Hamas in Gaza is Yahya Al-Sinwar". Middle East Monitor. Archived from the original on 4 November 2026.
- Fabian, Emanuel (24 January 2025). "Hamas confirms deaths of senior officials months after Israel said they were killed in airstrike". The Times of Israel. Archived from the original on 4 November 2026.
- Sanders, Edmund (16 October 2011). "Gaza prisoner's wife awaits husband she hardly knows". Los Angeles Times. Archived from the original on 4 November 2026.

=== Web ===
- روحي مشتهى [Rawhi Mushtaha] (in Arabic). Vision Center for Political Development. Archived from the original on 4 November 2026.
- "Executive Order 13224". United States Department of State. Archived from the original on 4 November 2026.
- "Rawhi Mushtaha*". European Council on Foreign Relations. Archived from the original on 4 November 2026.
