= Muhammad Shabana =

Hamas commander (1973–2025)

- محمد شبانة

Commander of the Rafah Brigade
- In office 21 August 2014 – 13 May 2025
- Preceded by: Raed al-Atar
- Succeeded by: Nael Abu Obeid

Personal details
- Born: 1973 Rafah, Gaza Strip
- Died: 13 May 2025 (aged 51–52) Gaza European Hospital, Khan Yunis, Gaza Strip
- Cause of death: Assassination by airstrike

Military service
- Allegiance: Hamas
- Branch/service: al-Qassam Brigades
- Rank: Commander
- Battles/wars: 2014 Gaza War; 2021 Gaza War; Gaza war; October 7 attacks; Israeli invasion of the Gaza Strip

Muhammad Shabaneh (Arabic: محمد شبانة; 1973 – 13 May 2025), also known by his nickname Abu Anas (Arabic: أبو أنس), was the commander of the Rafah Brigade in the military wing of Hamas, the Izz ad-Din al-Qassam Brigades. Under his command were about four battalions.

It was reported that Shabaneh had a large extended family in Sinai, Egypt. In leaflets dropped by the IDF in Gaza in November 2023, a bounty of $500,000 was offered for his capture.

In May 2025, the IDF and Shin Bet claimed that de facto leader of Hamas in the Gaza Strip Mohammed Sinwar was targeted in an Israeli airstrike on a bunker under the Gaza European Hospital in Khan Yunis. The strike killed 26 people, according to the Gaza Health Ministry. According to the Saudi channel Al-Hadath, Shabaneh's body was recovered from the tunnel along with Sinwar.

== Biography ==
=== Hamas ===
Shabaneh was born in Rafah in 1973. Even before his appointment as commander of the Rafah Brigade, during Operation Cast Lead on December 31, 2008, according to Palestinian reports, the IDF attacked his home in the Shabora neighborhood in Rafah, but Shabaneh was not injured.

After the death of Raed al Atar during Operation Protective Edge in 2014, Shabaneh was appointed to replace him as the commander of the Rafah Brigade.

=== During the Gaza War ===
In the first two days following Hamas' surprise attack on Israel on October 7, 2023, two of Shabaneh's sons, Abd al-Nasser and Mahmoud, who were members of the Nukhba Force of the Izz ad-Din al-Qassam Brigades, were killed.

According to Palestinian reports, on December 20, 2023, the IDF attempted to kill him by attacking the Shabaneh family home in eastern Rafah, but Mohammad Shabaneh survived unharmed.

His eldest son, Anas, was also killed on May 18, 2024, in battles with the IDF in the Al-Tannur neighborhood of Rafah.

On May 24, 2024, another assassination attempt was made when a tunnel containing an underground complex where he was believed to be hiding was attacked, but Shabaneh survived.

== Assassination ==
On May 13, 2025, reports emerged that Shabaneh was killed alongside the de facto leader of Hamas in the Gaza Strip, Mohammed Sinwar, in an Israeli airstrike on a bunker under the Gaza European Hospital in Khan Yunis.

On May 31, 2025, the IDF and Shin Bet confirmed that Shabaneh had been killed in the airstrike. Hamas confirmed Shabana's death on December 29, 2025.

Shabana's successor, Nael Abu Obeid, was killed in an Israeli drone strike on 15 September 2026.
