= Marwan Issa =

Palestinian Hamas military commander (1965–2024)

- مروان عيسى
- Born: Marwan Abdel Karim Ali Issa; 1965; Bureij, Egyptian-administered Gaza Strip, Palestine
- Died: 10 March 2024 (aged 58–59); Nuseirat, Deir al-Balah, Gaza Strip, Palestine
- Cause of death: Assassination by airstrike
- Burial place: New Bureij Cemetery, Palestine
- Other names: Shadow Man, Abu Baraa
- Known for: Being the deputy commander of Al-Qassam Brigades
- Children: 4 (2 deceased)

Marwan Abdel Karim Ali Issa (Arabic: مروان عبد الكريم علي عيسى, romanized: Marwān ʿAbd al-Karīm ʿAlī ʿĪsā; 1965 – 10 March 2024) was a Palestinian militant who was the deputy commander of Hamas' military wing, Al-Qassam Brigades.

Issa was born in the Bureij refugee camp in the Gaza Strip in 1965. He was educated at the Islamic University of Gaza, and played basketball for Al-Bureij Services Club. He was arrested in 1987 during the First Intifada for his involvement with Hamas. He was detained by the Palestinian Authority from 1997 to 2000, and released after the outbreak of the Second Intifada.

He became the head of the Qassam Brigades in the refugee camps in the central Gaza Strip and played a central role in the development of its military systems. He reported to Mohammed Deif. He was placed on the terror watchlist of the United States in 2019 and the European Union in 2023. Issa was said to have had a major role in planning the October 7 attacks. On 10 March 2024, he was killed in an Israeli airstrike in Nuseirat during the 2023 Gaza War.

== Early life ==
Issa was born in the Bureij refugee camp in the Gaza Strip in 1965, where his family had moved from Ashkelon after they fled or were expelled when Israel was established in 1948. He was educated at the Islamic University of Gaza, and played basketball for Al-Bureij Services Club. In 1987, he was arrested during the First Intifada.

He was later detained by the Palestinian Authority from 1997 to 2000, but released after the outbreak of the Second Intifada.

== Leadership in Hamas ==
Issa became the head of the Qassam Brigades in the refugee camps in the central Gaza Strip and played a central role in the development of their military systems. Issa was later one of Israel's most wanted militants. He was seriously wounded in an Israeli assassination attempt during a 2006 meeting also attended by Deif and other top Qassam Brigade commanders.

Issa rarely appeared in public, but in 2011, he was photographed at a reception for those released in the Gilad Shalit prisoner exchange. Issa was a member of the Hamas team negotiating the exchange with Ahmed Jabari, Saleh al-Arouri, and Nizar Awadallah. Issa's home was bombed in 2014 and 2021.

As Deif's second-in-command, Issa was closely involved in planning the 2023 Hamas attack on Israel. During the 2023 Gaza War, Issa was one of Israel's three most wanted Hamas militants, alongside Yahya Sinwar and Muhammed Deif, the three forming a military council. Issa would replace Sinwar or Deif if either was killed. The European Union linked Issa directly to the attack and placed Issa and Deif on its terrorist blacklist on 8 December.

According to Tamir Hayman, former head of Israel's Institute for National Security Studies and former head of the Military Intelligence Directorate, Issa played a crucial strategic role in the organization that went beyond military matters. Hayman described him as "the strategic mind of Hamas" and highlighted Issa's influence as a close confidant of Sinwar, acting as a stabilizing force and facilitating connections within the Hamas leadership.

Issa was designated as a terrorist by the United States on 10 September 2019.

== Personal life ==
Issa's eldest son Baraa died in 2009, aged nine, after he was refused passage from the Gaza Strip for medical treatment in Egypt. Another son, Muhammad, was killed in 2023 in an Israeli airstrike in Gaza during the 2023 Gaza War.

== Assassination ==
Israel had previously attempted to assassinate Issa by destroying his house twice, during the 2014 Gaza War and the 2021 Israel–Palestine crisis, killing his brother. Issa's son was killed in an Israeli airstrike in central Gaza in December 2023. Marwan Issa was labeled a Specially Designated Global Terrorist by the United States in September 2019.

On 11 March 2024, Israel announced the targeting of an underground facility in Nuseirat, central Gaza, used by Issa, airing footage of the strike and noting that the results were still being analyzed. Israel announced the targeting of an underground facility in Nuseirat in the central Gaza Strip, apparently used by Issa, airing footage of the strike and noting that the results were still being analyzed. Five Palestinians were reportedly killed in the bombing. Hamas did not respond until it privately confirmed Issa's death on 17 March 2024. Hamas officially confirmed his death on 19 January 2025. Hamas, which had not disclosed much about its senior military leaders during the war, did not immediately respond.

On 17 March 2024, it was reported that Hamas had confirmed in private that Issa had been killed in the strike. At the time of his killing, Issa was the highest-ranking Hamas commander to be killed in the war. Prime Minister Benjamin Netanyahu reportedly hailed the news as "a great achievement for Israel" and stated "they will all die, we will reach them all."

On 18 March 2024, White House National Security Advisor Jake Sullivan confirmed Issa's death. He added that "a military plan cannot succeed without an integrated humanitarian plan and political plan".

On 26 March 2024, the Israel Defense Forces officially confirmed Issa's death.

Initially, Hamas did not confirm or deny Issa's death publicly. On 19 January 2025, Hamas officially confirmed that Marwan Issa has been killed. This was later affirmed in a speech by Abu Obeida, the spokesperson for the Qassam Brigades, which serves as the armed wing of Hamas.

According to the Israel Defense Forces, the other targeted Hamas official, Ghazi Abu Tama'a, was a former head of Hamas's Central Camps Brigade and was responsible "for all of Hamas's weapons in Gaza".

The Qassam Brigades held a funeral service for Marwan Issa on 7 February 2025, and he was buried in his birthplace of Bureij.

=== Analysis ===
Experts noted that Issa's death did not represent a significant threat to the group's survival, insisting that "there's always a replacement" and that Hamas will "overcome" the assassination in a week or two.

Al Jazeera's senior political analyst, Marwan Bishara, noted that "the idea of declaring victory because one or two, or several Hamas leaders were killed, has proven to be more of a facade" and that "Hamas has proven more than capable of producing more and more leaders".
