= Raed al Atar =

Palestinian military commander (1974–2014)

Commander of Al-Qassam Brigades in Rafah Raed al Atar
- رائد العطار
- Born: 1974; Palestine, Gaza
- Died: 21 August 2014 (aged 39–40); Rafah, Gaza
- Military career
- Conflicts: Gaza War (2008–09); Operation Stones of Baked Clay; 2014 Israel–Gaza conflict

Raed al-Atar (Arabic: رائد العطار, romanized: Ra'ed el-'Atār, 1974 – 2014) was the commander of the Rafah Brigade of the Hamas Izz ad-Din al-Qassam Brigades and member of the Hamas high military council. According to the Congressional Research Service analyst Jim Zanotti, his command was important due to Rafah being the destination point for the smuggling tunnels from Egypt.

In 2010, al Atar reportedly held significant power and influence in the Gaza Strip, and asserted authority over the smuggling tunnels. He was the third most senior Hamas military commander, according to Israel.

In April 1995, al Atar was sentenced, following a quick trial by the Palestinian Authority court, to two years in jail for training with illegal weapons.

On 1 February 1999 a Palestinian police captain, Rifat Joudah, was killed in Gaza a shootout with al Atar and two other members of Hamas, as he was trying to arrest them. The men sped away, running over an 8-year-old girl, Fadwa Abu Jerwana, who died from her injuries. The men were subsequently arrested in the Shati refugee camp following a second exchange of fire with security forces. In April that year, al Atar was sentenced to death by the Palestinian Authority for the killing of Rifat Joudah. As soon as the death sentence was pronounced, al Atar's relatives took to the streets and stoned the Joudeh home. Violent protests in Gaza resulted in two deaths. Following the riots and criticism of the trial, Yasser Arafat met with civic leaders in Rafah and asked them to restore calm, promising to review the death sentence.

In 2006, al Atar directed the cross-border raid in which Israeli soldier Gilad Shalit was captured. He was also present during Shalit's release from captivity during the 2011 prisoner exchange.

During the 2009 Gaza War, al Atar fled to el-Arīsh, Sinai, along with, Mohammed Sinwar a militant who had helped coordinate the abduction of an Israeli soldier, Gilad Shalit. That year, al Atar told reporters that if Israel did not accept the Hamas' demands to free 1,450 Palestinian prisoners in exchange for Shalit, Hamas would kidnap more soldiers.

Reports surfaced that al Atar authorized the August 2010 firing of Grad-style rockets from the Sinai Peninsula at Eilat, Israel and Aqaba, Jordan. According to Palestinian sources, al Atar authorized the attack, with the approval of the Hamas leadership abroad, including Khaled Mashal, and with the backing of Iranian intelligence agents. According to some reports, the attack took place reportedly without the knowledge of his direct commander, Ahmed Jabari, while according to Egyptian officials, such an operation could not have been carried out without Jabari's approval.

== Death ==
Raed al Atar was killed along with two other senior operatives of Hamas during an Israeli airstrike in Rafah on 21 August 2014, during the 2014 Israel-Gaza conflict.
