= Mohammed Deif =

Palestinian Hamas militant (1965–2024)

- محمد الضيف
- Portrait released by Hamas confirming his death

6th Commander of the Izz al-Din al-Qassam Brigades
- In office 22 July 2002 – 13 July 2024
- Preceded by: Salah Shehade
- Succeeded by: Mohammed Sinwar

Personal details
- Born: Mohammed Diab Ibrahim al-Masri; 12 August 1965 Khan Yunis refugee camp, Egyptian-occupied Gaza Strip
- Died: 13 July 2024 (aged 58) Khan Yunis, Gaza Strip
- Cause of death: Assassination by airstrike
- Spouse: Widad Asfoura (m. 2007; died 2014) (Note: Widad was killed by an Israeli airstrike aimed at Mohammed Deif, that also killed their children Sarah and Ali. Widad had two other children with Deif: Omar survived with minor injuries, and the status of Hala is unknown.)
- Children: 6
- Education: Islamic University of Gaza (BSc)
- Nicknames: Abu Khaled (kunya); The Mastermind; The Cat with Nine Lives

Military service
- Allegiance: Hamas
- Service years: 1987–2024
- Rank: Chief of Staff (2002–2024)
- Commands: Ezzedeen al-Qassam Brigades Chief of Staff
- Conflicts: First Intifada; Second Intifada; Gaza–Israel conflict; 2012 Gaza War; 2014 Gaza War; 2021 Israel–Palestine crisis; Gaza war; October 7 attacks; Israeli invasion of the Gaza Strip; Siege of Khan Yunis

Mohammed Diab Ibrahim al-Masri (Arabic: محمد دياب إبراهيم المصري, romanized: Muḥammad Diyāb Ibrāhīm al-Maṣrī; 12 August 1965 – 13 July 2024), better known as Mohammed Deif (Arabic: محمد الضيف), was a Palestinian militant who served as the sixth commander of the Izz al-Din al-Qassam Brigades of Palestinian group Hamas. He succeeded Salah Shehade after the latter was killed in an Israeli airstrike in July 2002, until his own assassination by Israel in July 2024. He was succeeded by Mohammed Sinwar, the younger brother of Yahya Sinwar. He was a central figure in the Gaza war and one of the masterminds of the October 7 attacks, alongside Yahya Sinwar.

Deif was born in 1965 in the Khan Yunis Refugee Camp in the Gaza Strip (at the time occupied by Egypt), to a family that had fled or been expelled due to the 1948 war, which resulted in the creation of the state of Israel and what Palestinians call the Nakba. He reportedly left school temporarily to support his low-income family, later graduating with a bachelor's degree in chemistry from the Islamic University of Gaza in 1988, where he had established a theater group.

Deif joined Hamas in 1987, weeks after it was established during the First Intifada against the Israeli occupation of the Palestinian territories which had been ongoing since the Six-Day War in 1967. He later became known as Mohammed Deif, meaning "guest" in Arabic—possibly in reference to the nomadic lifestyle he adopted to avoid being targeted. During the 1990s and early 2000s, he planned several suicide bombing attacks, including the 1996 Jaffa Road bus bombings. He became the head of the al-Qassam Brigades in 2002 and developed the group's capabilities, transforming it from a cluster of amateur cells to organized military units. He masterminded the group's strategy of combining rocket attacks on Israel with tunnel warfare, and was central to planning the October 7 attacks that initiated the Gaza war.

Deif had been on the Israeli military's most wanted list since 1995 for killing Israeli soldiers and civilians. He was detained by the Palestinian Authority at Israel's request in 2000 before escaping months later. He had been targeted in multiple Israeli assassination attempts since 2001, surviving at least seven attempts on his life. His wife, infant son, and 3-year-old daughter were killed in an Israeli airstrike in 2014. The United States and the European Union added Deif to their terrorism lists in 2015 and 2023 respectively.

Israel killed Deif in an airstrike on al-Mawasi on 13 July 2024. For over six months, Hamas denied reports of his death, but eventually confirmed his death on 30 January 2025. In November 2024, the International Criminal Court (ICC) had issued an arrest warrant for Deif, claiming it was unable to verify if he had indeed been killed, but the warrant was cancelled in late February 2025 after Hamas confirmed his death.

== Early life and education ==
Mohammed Diab Ibrahim al-Masri was born on 12 August 1965 in the Khan Younis refugee camp in the southern Gaza Strip, which was then under the control of Egypt. His family originates from al-Qubeiba (now Kfar Gevirol, Israel), a former town near Ramleh in what was then Mandatory Palestine (now Ramla, Israel), but fled or were expelled during the 1948 Palestine war. According to the Shin Bet, either his father or his uncle had participated in sporadic raids into Israel conducted by Palestinian fedayeen in the 1950s.

Although not much is known about the details of his early life and upbringing, he reportedly had to temporarily drop out of school to support his low-income family, working with his father in upholstery and later starting a small poultry farm. It is understood that he studied chemistry at the Islamic University of Gaza, from which he graduated with a bachelor's degree of Science (BSc) in 1988.

During his years at the university, he had a passion for theatre, establishing a theatre group called "The Returners", in reference to Palestinian refugees longing to return to the lands they lived on before the establishment of the state of Israel, and the Palestinian exodus known as the Nakba. He played a number of roles, including those of historical figures.

== Early militant career ==
Deif joined Hamas in 1987, weeks after its establishment during the First Intifada against Israel, which was then occupying the Gaza Strip and the entirety of the West Bank. He was arrested by Israeli authorities in 1989 for his involvement with the organization. After 16 months of detention, he was released in a prisoner exchange. Soon after his release, he helped establish the Ezzedeen al-Qassam Brigades, the armed wing of Hamas.

Deif was close to Emad Akel and Yahya Ayyash, who were assassinated by Israel in 1993 and 1996 respectively. He trained with, and learnt bombmaking from, Ayyash. After Ayyash's assassination, Deif reduced his profile to avoid being targeted. During the 1990s and early 2000s, he was behind a number of suicide bombing attacks, including the 1996 Jaffa Road bus bombings. He also oversaw the kidnappings and later killings of Israeli soldiers Shahar Simani, Aryeh Frankenthal, and Nachshon Wachsman in the 1990s.

In May 2000, Deif was arrested by the Palestinian National Authority at Israel's request, but he escaped in December with assistance from some of his guards.

According to Israeli journalist Ronen Bergman, Deif's campaign of massive retaliation and the failure of Israeli intelligence services to prevent it, was one of the factors that led to the defeat of Prime Minister Shimon Peres and the Israeli Labor Party in the 1996 Israeli general election and the victory of the right-wing Likud party of Benjamin Netanyahu, who opposed the Oslo peace process:

At the beginning of February, Peres was up twenty points in the polls over his opposition, the conservative hawk Benjamin "Bibi" Netanyahu. By the middle of March, Netanyahu had closed the gap significantly, and Peres led by only five percentage points. On May 29, Netanyahu won by 1 percent of the vote. This was all due to the terror attacks, which Peres simply couldn't stop. Yahya Ayyash's disciples had ensured the right wing's victory and "derailed the peace process," in the words of the deputy head of the Shin Bet, Yisrael Hasson.

After Netanyahu got elected, attacks stopped, with some asserting that this was because Yasser Arafat clamped down on Hamas members, but Bergman insisting that the halt was because the short-term goal of the attacks was to stop the Oslo peace process, and Netanyahu was now working towards the same goal.

== Head of the al-Qassam Brigades ==
Deif became the head of the al-Qassam Brigades after Israel assassinated Salah Shehade in July 2002. Between July 2006 and November 2012, effective command was exercised by Deif's deputy, Ahmed Jabari, after Deif was seriously wounded in an Israeli assassination attempt.

As the overall commander of the al-Qassam Brigades, he is thought to be the main organizer of the raid into Israel that killed two IDF soldiers and captured Gilad Shalit in June 2006, as well as the five-year operations to deceive Mossad and Shin Bet about Shalit's location in Gaza. He was also in charge of the al-Qassam Brigades' procurement of weapons from abroad, overseeing the transfer and manufacturing of Iranian Fajr-5 rocket components into Gaza, and maintained correspondence with Iranian Quds Force commander Esmail Qaani and his predecessor Qasem Soleimani. In a letter, Soleimani had called Deif a "dear brother" and a "living martyr".

In September 2015, the US Department of State added Deif and three other Hamas leaders to the American list of Specially Designated Global Terrorists. In December 2023, the European Union added him to their terror blacklist.

=== Shadow Unit ===
Deif also created the "Shadow Unit" within the al-Qassam Brigades. Among the unit's duties are "to guard enemy captives held by the al-Qassam Brigades, to hide them and to thwart enemy attempts to find them." An al-Qassam video said that the unit "treats enemy captives honorably, in line with the rules of Islam, and provides for their needs, taking into account the treatment given to the prisoners of the resistance in the hands of the enemy."

=== Strategy ===
Deif has been credited with transforming the al-Qassam Brigades from a cluster of amateur cells to organized military units, described as an 'army,' that are capable of invading Israel. His military strategy has been dubbed the 'above and below' strategy, built on attacking Israeli territory with rockets and constructing underground tunnels to be used in infiltrating the border with Israel.

=== Gaza war ===
As the highest-ranking leader of the al-Qassam Brigades, Deif was involved in orchestrating the surprise attack on Israel that commenced the Gaza war, which, according to a source close to Hamas, he began planning in the lead up to the 2021 Israel–Palestine crisis, motivated by scenes of Israeli forces storming al-Aqsa Mosque during Ramadan. According to France 24, he was the mastermind behind the attack on 7 October. The decision to launch the attack was taken jointly by Deif and Yahya Sinwar, the leader of Hamas in the Gaza Strip.

After the attack, a Reuters report stated that over the previous two years, Deif deceived Israel into believing Hamas was not interested in another round of conflict. This deception campaign involved a decision not to participate in the clashes between Israel and the Palestinian Islamic Jihad in August 2022 and May 2023, putting Israel under the impression that Hamas "was not ready for a fight" and could be contained by providing economic incentives to Gazan workers.

On the day of the attack, Deif gave an audio address, his first since 2021, justifying it as a response to the "desecration" of the al-Aqsa Mosque and the killing and wounding of hundreds of Palestinians in 2023. He called on Palestinians and Arab Israelis to "expel the occupiers and demolish the walls". Announcing the start of "Operation Al-Aqsa Storm," Deif said that "In light of the continuing crimes against our people, in light of the orgy of occupation and its denial of international laws and resolutions, and in light of American and western support, we've decided to put an end to all this so that the enemy understands that he can no longer revel without being held to account."

On 20 May 2024, a request for an arrest warrant against Deif and four other Palestinian and Israeli leaders was filed by the Prosecutor of the International Criminal Court (ICC) on several counts of war crimes and crimes against humanity, as part of its investigation in Palestine. The effort continued into September 2024, with the prosecutor saying that he was gathering information about Deif's "reported death." (Note: The prosecutor's jurisdiction ends with the death of the defendant) On 21 November, the court officially indicted Deif for war crimes, stating that he bore responsibility for mass killings, hostage taking and rape during the 7 October attacks. The ICC argued that it was "not in a position to determine whether [Deif] has been killed or remains alive" following reports that Deif was killed in an Israeli airstrike on 13 July 2024.

On 3 September 2024, the United States Department of Justice announced criminal charges against Deif and other Hamas officials for their roles in the October 7 attacks on Israel. The charges, which were filed under seal in February 2024, include conspiracy to provide material support to a foreign terrorist organization, conspiracy to murder U.S. nationals, and conspiracy to finance terrorism.

== Unsuccessful assassination attempts ==
The Israeli military and security forces have killed numerous members of Deif's family in failed attempts to kill Deif, who was on top of Israel's 'most wanted list' since 1995, and other airstrikes. Deif's survival earned him the nickname 'the cat with nine lives' among his Israeli adversaries. He survived at least seven Israeli assassination attempts.

As of December 2023, Israeli military and security forces had killed Deif's brother, his nephew, his niece, his wife, his 3-year-old daughter, and his 7-month-old son.

=== Early attempts (2001 to 2006) ===
The first attempt on his life was by an airstrike in 2001, before he assumed the leadership of the al-Qassam Brigades. Israel tried again to kill Deif in September 2002 by a strike on his car. Video footage from that attempt show Deif covered in blood as a man drags him away.

In 2003 and in July 2006, Israel tried again by striking a house that hosted a meeting of the Hamas leadership. It is also said that the July 2006 attempt was an airstrike on the house of one of Deif's lecturers in university when Deif was visiting him.

=== Impact on health ===
After the 2006 assassination attempt, Deif spent three months in Egypt for treatment of his skull after shrapnel lodged in it, and he continued to take daily tranquillizers to treat headaches.

It was believed that the seven assassination attempts had lost Deif an eye and limbs. Hamas did not confirm or deny these claims and did not comment on his health. Footage obtained by the Israeli military in December 2023 showed Deif using both hands and walking on his own two feet, though with a slight limp and occasionally with the aid of a wheelchair.

=== 2014 Gaza war ===
In August 2014, during the 2014 Gaza War, the Israeli air force attempted to assassinate him with an airstrike on the Deif family home in Sheikh Radwan in Gaza City. Hamas denied that Deif was killed, and his survival was confirmed by Israeli intelligence in 2015.

=== Two failed attempts in one week (2021) ===
In May 2021, during the 2021 Israel–Palestine crisis, the Israel military tried to kill Deif twice in one week, but both attempts proved unsuccessful.

=== October 2023 attack on father's house ===
In October 2023, during the Gaza war, Deif's father's house was hit by an Israeli airstrike, killing Deif's brother, nephew, and niece. It was unclear whether or not the airstrike targeted Deif.

== Assassination ==
An animated GIF of the airstrike released by the IDF

An undated photo used by the Israel Defense Forces to announce that his assassination was successful (Note: Seven months prior to the release of this particular photo, the IDF released similar photos confiscated during the course of the Gaza War.)

On 13 July 2024, he was targeted in an Israeli strike in the al-Mawasi neighborhood of Khan Yunis in the southern Gaza Strip. According to reports from the Hamas-run Gaza Ministry of Health, at least 90 Palestinians were killed and over 300 injured as a result of the attack. The IDF reported that one of Deif's associates and a mastermind of the 7 October attack, the Khan Yunis Brigade commander Rafa Salama, was among the dead. In relation to Deif, the IDF stated that there were signs that he too had been killed, but they were unable to officially confirm that. Reportedly, a dead body suspected to belong to Deif was recovered from the site but was too badly disfigured to be identified. On 1 August 2024, the IDF announced it had confirmed that Deif died in the 13 July strike. Two weeks after the IDF announced its confirmation, Hamas denied that Deif was killed, with senior Hamas official Osama Hamdan stating in an interview with the Associated Press that Deif was still alive.

In October 2024, Hamas again called Deif's death a lie, while issuing a statement denying the death of Yahya Sinwar. The next day Hamas acknowledged Sinwar's death without making any additional comments about Deif's status. In early November, the London-based Saudi newspaper Asharq Al-Awsat reported that Hamas has privately acknowledged Deif's death, but Hamas released a statement denying the newspaper's report.

On 21 November 2024 the International Criminal Court issued an arrest warrant for Mohammed Deif, arguing that it was unable to determine whether Deif had been killed and that the warrant would be withdrawn upon confirmation of his death.

On 4 December 2024, Israeli news channel Kan 11, citing Palestinian sources, reported that Hamas had located Deif's body and buried it in secret. According to the report, Hamas maintained secrecy over Deif's death due to fears that confirming it would lower the morale of its fighters, and buried him in an undisclosed location due to fears that if Israel discovered the location of his grave, the IDF would dig it up and take his body to use as a bargaining chip in a hostage deal.

On 30 January 2025, the Qassam Brigades, through their spokesperson Abu Obaida, confirmed that Mohammed Deif, along with six other senior Hamas commanders, died as a result of the Gaza war. Along with the confirmation, Hamas also officially released a photo of Deif for the first time, as his photo had previously been classified. About a month after Hamas confirmed Deif's death, in February 2025, the International Criminal Court cancelled the outstanding arrest warrant.

== Public image ==
Deif, the nom de guerre that Mohammed al-Masri took, means 'guest' in Arabic. This was said to refer to Deif staying in a different house each night as a precaution against Israeli attacks. Another explanation said that the name comes from a theatre role he played in his earlier years. He was also known by his kunya Abu Khaled.

Prior to the Gaza war, only two photos of Deif's face were known to publicly exist, with the most recent one having been taken in the year 2000. He never appeared in public, and he rarely gave recorded audio addresses. His whereabouts were often unknown, but it was speculated that he had stayed in the underground tunnel networks in Gaza. In January 2024, the IDF released a photo of Deif holding a cup of juice in one hand and a stack of U.S. dollars in the other hand. The photo was found in a computer that Israel seized from Hamas.

In spite of his elusiveness, he was popular amongst Palestinians for his hardline stance against Israel, to the point of being a 'folk hero' for having survived many assassination attempts; he was nicknamed 'the mastermind' by Palestinians. As a sign of his popularity, his name was featured in protest slogans such as: "Put the sword before the sword, we are the men of Mohammed Deif." His position as a military leader rather than a political one also shielded him from criticism of the Hamas administration of the Gaza Strip.

After acknowledging his death, Hamas began using photos of Deif at ceremonies for the release of the hostages to the custody of the Red Cross as part of the January 2025 Gaza war ceasefire agreement.

== Personal life ==
Deif married Widad Asfoura in 2007. Widad, their infant son Ali, and their three-year-old daughter Sarah were killed in the 2014 assassination attempt. They had two other children: Omar, who was injured, and Hala, who was missing for more than two days. Deif had two other sons, Bahaa and Khaled.

Deif's mother died in 2011, and his father in 2022.

His family came to the Gaza Strip from further away than most members of Hamas; before 1948 his family lived in al-Qubayba (near modern day Lachish, Israel).

== See also ==
- Ismail Haniyeh
- Marwan Issa
