= Ahmed Jabari =

Palestinian militant and senior leader of Hamas (1960–2012)

- أحمد الجعبري
- Born: 4 December 1960; Gaza City, Egyptian-administered Gaza Strip, Palestine
- Died: 14 November 2012 (aged 51); Gaza City, Palestine
- Cause of death: Airstrike by Israeli Air Force
- Resting place: Sheikh Radwan cemetery
- Education: Islamic University of Gaza
- Known for: 2006 Gaza cross-border raid
- Political party: Hamas
- Other political affiliations: Fatah
- Spouse: 2 wives
- Children: 6
- Military career
- Allegiance: Palestine (Hamas)
- Branch: Izz ad-Din al-Qassam Brigades
- Rank: Military Commander

Ahmed al-Jabari (Note: Also spelled Jaabari, Ja'bari or Ja'abari.) (Arabic: أحمد الجعبري; 1960 – 14 November 2012), also known as Abu Mohammad, was a Palestinian militant who served as second-in-command of the military wing of Hamas, the Izz ad-Din al-Qassam Brigades. He was widely credited as the leading figure in the Hamas takeover of the Gaza Strip, and commanded the 2006 Gaza cross-border raid which resulted in the capture of Israeli soldier Gilad Shalit. Under his command, along with chief logistics officer Mahmoud al-Mabhouh, Hamas developed its own military weapons capability significantly by acquiring longer-range guided missiles and rockets.

While at the Islamic University of Gaza, Jabari joined Fatah, a Palestinian organization that advocated for an armed struggle against Israel. In 1982, he was arrested by the Israeli authorities and imprisoned for 13 years. After being released he joined Fatah's Islamist rival Hamas' militant wing and was believed to have been involved in the bombing of a bus in Kfar Darom, following which he was arrested by the Preventive Security Force of the Palestinian Authority in 1998, being released the following year. In 2002, Jabari became the acting operational head of Hamas' military wing when Mohammad Deif was seriously wounded in an Israeli airstrike. In this position Jabari was also a high-ranking official within Hamas' political leadership, as well as the founder of the Nur Association, which aimed to help "martyrs and prisoners."

The Israeli Air Force and Shin Bet conducted a targeted precision air strike on 14 November 2012, as part of Operation Pillar of Defense, killing Jabari while he was travelling in a car. The decision to liquidate him, according to Haaretz analyst Reuven Pedatzur, arose from a decision by Israeli military to attack Hamas rather than seek a ceasefire. Jabari was the highest-level Hamas official killed in Gaza since the 2008–2009 Gaza War.

== Early life and education ==
Jabari was born on 4 December 1960 to an activist family based in the Shuja'iyya district of Gaza City that was forced to leave Hebron due to a family blood feud. He graduated from the Islamic University of Gaza with a degree in history. In 1982, Jabari was arrested and imprisoned by Israeli authorities when he was a member of the secular Palestinian militant organization Fatah. According to Al Arabiya, while serving 13 years in prison, he left Fatah and joined Hamas after meeting with some of the latter's founders who were also incarcerated at the time, namely Abd al-Aziz Rantissi, Nizar Rayyan and Salah Shehadeh.

== Hamas ==
After his release, in 1995 Jabari began to act as a commander in the military wing of the Hamas. In addition, he dealt with the movement's charitable organizations and was responsible for coordinating between the collection of money and military activities. In the middle of the 1990s, Jabari was directly involved in planning suicide bombings against Israeli citizens. Then, due to his involvement with these military activities in the Gaza Strip, Jabari was arrested by the Preventive Security Force of the Palestinian Authority in October 1998 for his alleged role in the Kfar Darom bus attack. He was released in late 1999. After his release he became an assistant of Salah Shehadeh and Mohamed Aldahef, the commanders of the military wing, in charge with improvement of military actions. Thus, he was part of Hamas's high-ranking military leadership during the first intifada and of the first Intifada cell.

On 26 September 2002, after an Israeli airstrike wounded Mohammed Deif, the leader of Hamas's principal armed wing, the Izz al-Din al-Qassam Brigades, Jabari became the commander and operational head of the military wing at the height of the Second Intifada (the armed Palestinian uprising against Israel from 2000 to 2007). However, Deif remains its official head. According to Hamas political leader Ayman Taha, since Jabari took over the al-Qassam Brigades' day-to-day operations, Hamas's armed wing became increasingly professional. During the course of the Intifada, he directed several attacks against Israel, including suicide bombings, that resulted in the deaths of hundreds of Israeli civilians and soldiers.

On 17 August 2004, Jabari's eldest son Mohammed, his brother and three of his cousins were killed in an Israeli air strike against Jabari's home in Gaza in an assassination attempt against him. He escaped the attack unhurt. He stated in a 2005 interview with Reuters that "Jihad and resistance" were the "only ways to liberate the homeland, and not negotiation and bargains."

Jabari was in charge of overseeing the captivity of Gilad Shalit who was kidnapped by Palestinian militants in 2006 outside of the Gaza Strip; two other soldiers were killed. According to the Israeli government, Jabari played a leading role in Hamas' takeover of the Gaza Strip from the Fatah-led Palestinian Authority in June 2007.

During Israel's offensive Operation Cast Lead against the Gaza Strip in December 2008, Jabari's home was allegedly destroyed in an airstrike, but the circumstances surrounding the incident were unclear and inconclusive. After long years of military activities in Hamas, Jabari became one of the influential leaders within the organization. In September 2010, Jabari threatened to increase attacks against Israel to derail the Israeli-Palestinian peace negotiations: "With the power of faith, weapons and missiles, tunnels and commandos we will achieve victory for Palestine and we'll end the occupation in Gaza too."

When a prisoners-exchange was arranged handing back Shalit to Israel in return for 1,027 Palestinian prisoners in October 2011, Jabari personally escorted Shalit to the Rafah Crossing with Egypt, making a rare public appearance. Abu Hudaifa, a close confidante, noted that Jabari "followed the mission until the end in minute detail by himself." In an interview with Al Hayat newspaper, Jabari confirmed that most of the 477 prisoners released in the first part of the prisoner exchange were collectively responsible for the deaths of 569 Israelis. In April 2012, Jabari was elected to the political bureau of Hamas.

Jabari was also instrumental in enforcing ceasefires from the Palestinian side, which included restricting rival militants groups from firing rockets and missiles. In addition to his activities given above, Jabari served as a member of the group's political leadership. He also founded Nur, which is an association to assist 'martyrs and prisoners.'

According to Gershon Baskin, who helped negotiate with Hamas for Gilad Shalit's release but did not speak to Jabari directly, Jabari had come to understand that continuing hostilities with Israel harmed both Hamas and the people of the Gaza Strip, and had worked hard on several occasions to prevent Hamas rocket and missile attacks on Israel. When such Hamas attacks took place, they were intentionally fired in order to deter Israel for taking military action against the group. Baskin also said that Jabari "was in line to die, not an angel and not a righteous man of peace." Baskin also claimed that Jabari received a draft of a long-term ceasefire or truce agreement with Israel only hours prior to his assassination.

Elhanan Miller, in The Times of Israel writes, "Baskin, who says he played a key role in negotiating for the release of kidnapped Israeli soldier Gilad Shalit last year, said Jabari would not meet with him, despite several requests during the Shalit talks. 'Jabari would never have direct contact with an Israeli', noting that he communicated with Jabari through Hamas official and spokesman Ghazi Hamad." Benjamin Kerstein wrote in The Times of Israel that Baskin's claims were in all likelihood not true, mainly because Israel would not involve someone like Baskin in important peace talks.

== Death and funeral ==
Jabari was extremely cautious with his personal safety, very rarely making public appearances and not carrying a telephone. He always used couriers to relay his messages to other Hamas leaders. These steps were taken to avoid any assassination attempt since he escaped five such attacks unhurt.

However, on 14 November 2012, he was killed by an Israeli drone strike while driving along Omar Mukhtar Street in Gaza City. He was 52 years old. His bodyguard, Mohammed Al Hams, who was traveling with him, was also killed. The assassination of Ahmed Jabari was precipitated by three days of rocket fire from militants in Gaza against southern Israel. These rocket attacks were Israel's stated reason for Jabari's assassination, which marked the official start of the Israeli offensive, Operation Pillar of Defense. The assassination, which was a joint operation by the Shin Bet and the IAF, led to a continuation of indiscriminate Palestinian rocket attacks against Israel that had been ongoing for days before the beginning of the operation and subsequent Israeli counter strikes against targets in Gaza over a four-day period called Operation Pillar of Defense.

Jabari was buried on 15 November 2012. According to Al Jazeera English correspondent Rula Amin, Jabari was "considered a hero" by the people of Gaza. Thousands of mourners attended his funeral procession which began at the Shifa Hospital, passed his home, then reached the Great Mosque of Gaza for mourning prayers. The procession ended at the Sheikh Radwan cemetery in the northern part of the city where Jabari was buried.

=== Reactions ===
Hamas' Lebanon spokesman Osama Hamdan said that it was likely Israel was targeting the Izz ad-Din al-Qassam Brigades military commanders. Hamas asserted that the Israeli "occupation has opened the doors of hell." Other Palestinian armed groups, such as the Popular Resistance Committees (PRC) and the Palestinian Islamic Jihad (PIJ) also denounced the killing of Jabari and vowed swift retaliation. The PIJ said it would "respond fiercely" to Jabari's death, calling it an "act of war." Member of the PLO Executive Committee, Saeb Erekat, condemned the "Israeli crime and assassination of Jabari." Angry protests erupted around the Shifa Hospital, where Jabari was taken, following news of his death, with members of Hamas demanding retaliation.

Egypt recalled its ambassador to Israel in protest of the attacks on the Gaza Strip and the killing of Jabari. According to a foreign ministry statement, Foreign Minister Kamel Amr "condemned the series of air strikes that Israel is currently conducting against Gaza Strip and which led to the killing of Ahmed al-Jabari." Qatari Foreign Minister Hamad bin Jassim al-Thani stated: "I condemn [the killing] in the name of Qatar. [...] This filthy crime must not pass without a punishment." He also called on the UN Security Council to "preserve the peace and security in the world." Hezbollah chief Hassan Nasrallah issued condolences to Hamas stating that Jabari was a "martyr" who "had a great history in the resistance." During consultations about the Israeli airstrikes, U.S. President Barack Obama and Egyptian President Mohamed Morsi agreed to work together to de-escalate the situation before it escalates.

== Personal life ==
Jabari had two wives and six children. Jabari's eldest son, Mohammed, died during a 2004 Israeli airstrike. Mohamed was married to Salah Shehade's daughter.
