= 2006 Gaza cross-border raid =

Palestinian attack on Israeli border post

- Part of the Gaza–Israel conflict
- Type: Cross-border raid
- Location: 31°14′00″N 34°17′08″E
- Commanded by: Ahmed Jabari (reportedly)
- Target: IDF army post near the Kerem Shalom border crossing
- Date: 25 June 2006; Around 5:30 am – (GMT+2)
- Executed by: 7 or 8 Palestinian militants from Izz ad-Din al-Qassam Brigades, Popular Resistance Committees, and Army of Islam
- Outcome: Capture of Gilad Shalit
- Casualties: 2 Palestinian militants and 2 IDF soldiers killed 4 IDF soldiers injured
- Location within the Gaza Strip

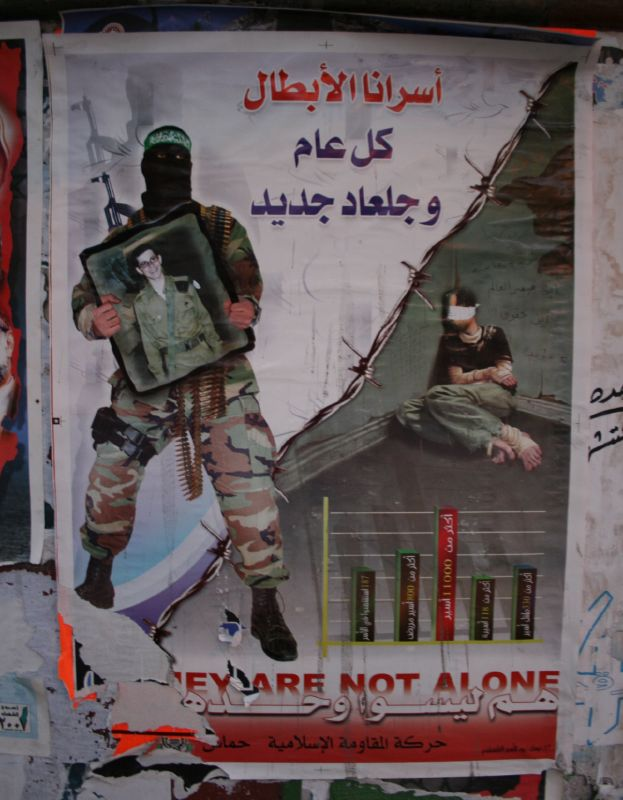
Gilad Shalit on Hamas poster, Nablus 7 May 2007

The 2006 Gaza cross-border raid, known by Palestinian militants as Operation Dispersive Illusion (Arabic: عملية الوهم المتبدد, romanized: ʿAmaliyyat al-Wahm Al-mutabadid) was an armed incursion carried out by seven or eight Gazan Palestinian militants on 25 June 2006 who attacked Israel Defense Forces (IDF) positions near the Kerem Shalom Crossing through an attack tunnel. In the attack, two IDF soldiers and two Palestinian militants were killed, four IDF soldiers were wounded, one of whom was Gilad Shalit, who was captured and taken to the Gaza Strip.

Hamas's military wing, the Izz ad-Din al-Qassam Brigades, claimed responsibility, together with the Popular Resistance Committees (which includes members of Fatah, Islamic Jihad, and Hamas), and a previously unknown group calling itself the Army of Islam. They stated the raid was in retaliation to an Israeli shelling and a series of air raids that had killed 22 Palestinians earlier that month.

The abduction of Shalit caused Israel to launch Operation "Summer Rains" which consisted of a series of incursions into Gaza. The operation failed to retrieve Shalit who was eventually released on 18 October 2011 as part of a prisoner swap. It was the first time since the capture of Nachshon Wachsman in 1994, that Palestinian fighters had captured an Israeli soldier.

== Background ==
In February 2005, the Palestinian Authority President Mahmoud Abbas and Israeli Prime Minister Ariel Sharon announced a ceasefire which effectively ended the Second Intifada. Hamas unilaterally agreed to abide by the ceasefire. Under the direction of Sharon, Israel withdrew from Gaza in September 2005.

To international surprise, Hamas won the Palestinian elections in January 2006, which were declared democratic by observers. The 'Quartet' demanded that Hamas renounce violence, recognize Israel, and accept previous Israeli-Palestinian agreements, which Hamas refused to do, resulting in aid being withheld. Israel imposed a blockade and sanctions on Gaza, and withheld customs revenue.

Hamas had announced a ceasefire in 2005 and until 10 June 2006. On 8 February 2006 Hamas' leader Khaled Meshaal offered a "long-term ceasefire" with Israel if the latter would withdraw to 1967 boundaries. Hours previously, Israeli Prime Minister Ehud Olmert, had promised never to give up control of key components of the occupied West Bank. However, according to the IDF, Hamas was still implicated in rocket attacks against Israeli civilians.

On 8 June 2006, while the cease-fire was still in effect, Jamal Abu Samhadana, Hamas' Inspector General in the Ministry of the Interior and founder of the Popular Resistance Committees, was assassinated by an Israeli air-strike on the Salah al-Dein Brigades training camp in Gaza which killed three other Palestinians. It was the fourth time Israel had tried to kill him. His supporters threatened to avenge his death. The IDF said Samhadana was planning an attack on Israel.

The next day, Palestinian fighters in Gaza fired rockets into southern Israel and a few hours later an explosion, which the IDF attributed to its shelling of a reported launch site, killed a Palestinian family of eight and injured at least 30 others. Hamas formally withdrew from its 16-month ceasefire in response to the explosion.

== The attack and the capture ==
On Sunday morning, 25 June 2006, at about 5:30 am (GMT+2) a squad of Palestinian militants from the Gaza Strip crossed the border into Israel via a 300-meter-long tunnel they had dug near the Kerem Shalom border crossing. The militants surfaced in Israeli territory shielded by a row of trees, and came up behind IDF border positions facing Gaza. As militants from within the Gaza Strip bombarded Israeli positions with mortar and anti-tank fire, the militant squad split into three cells.

One cell aligned itself behind a Merkava Mark III tank, another behind a concrete watchtower, and another behind an armored personnel carrier. The militants simultaneously opened fire on their targets. The militants that attacked the tank blew open its rear door with an RPG. The tank's gunner, Corporal Gilad Shalit, was wounded by the RPG blast, suffering a broken left hand and a light shoulder wound. Two of the militants then approached the tank. The RPG hit caused the tank to go up in flames, and its fire extinguisher system was activated. However, the engine stopped working and the ventilation system failed to work as a result, creating suffocating conditions inside. The tank's commander and driver climbed out to escape, and were gunned down by the militants. A militant then climbed onto the tank's turret and threw grenades into the tank, wounding another crew member. Shalit climbed out of the tank to escape the suffocating conditions, and as he emerged onto the turret, he saw one of the militants climbing onto the tank, with his AK-47 strapped to his back. Shalit at this point could have easily killed the militant using the .50 caliber machine gun mounted on the turret, but instead surrendered to him. He later told IDF investigators that he was confused and in a state of shock, and thus never thought of shooting him. Shalit was then taken to Gaza with the militants. An Israeli tank soon arrived on the scene and an IDF observation post witnessed their escape, although it was not known at the time that the militants had a captive Israeli soldier with them, and the tank did not open fire in time, as the commander was awaiting permission. When permission was finally granted, the tank opened fire with its machine guns.

The squad's third member was positioned near a road, and fired an RPG at an IDF jeep driven by a captain. After the captain returned fire, the militant fled towards a tunnel dug along the fence, throwing grenades. An IDF armored vehicle fired at him, but missed, and he escaped.

Two militants attacked the watchtower, raking it with RPG and small-arms fire, wounding two soldiers manning the tower. One militant crept towards the tower and placed an explosive charge next to the bottom doors. The ensuing explosion damaged the tower's communication cables. The militant then attempted to climb the stairs, while the second militant remained on the ground as backup. IDF soldiers in the tower spotted the militant climbing the stairs and opened fire, killing him in the upper part of the stairway. The second militant was spotted by an IDF lookout, and soldiers then opened fire and killed him.

The third cell attacked an empty armored personnel carrier placed as a decoy before retreating, firing an RPG which damaged it and caused it to burst into flames.

Immediately afterwards the militants made their way back into the Gaza Strip, with Shalit, through the ground after they blew an opening in the security fence and disappeared. As they retreated, the militants left behind explosive charges. Meanwhile, large Israeli military forces arrived at the site and began helping the wounded. The charges left behind by the militants exploded as IDF troops were combing the area, lightly injuring three soldiers. When they reached the tank, the soldiers discovered the two bodies and a wounded crewman. When it became clear that the fourth crew member was missing, an abduction alert was declared, and, various Israeli forces infiltrated Gaza.

=== Casualties ===
Two Israeli soldiers were killed in the operation; Staff Sergeant Pavel Slutzker, 20, of Dimona and Lieutenant Hanan Barak, 20, of Arad and two Palestinian militants; Muhammed Farawneh, 22, of Khan Yunis, Army of Islam member and Hamed Rantisi, 22, of Rafah, Popular Resistance Committees member.

== Israeli retaliation ==
The day after, on 26 June 2006, three Palestinian militant organizations took responsibility for the raid: The Izz ad-Din al-Qassam Brigades (the armed wing of Hamas); The Popular Resistance Committees organization (which includes members of Fatah, Islamic Jihad, and Hamas); And the Army of Islam, and issued a joint statement on 26 June 2006, in which they claimed responsibility for the raid and offered information on Shalit only if Israel agreed to release all female Palestinian prisoners and all Palestinian prisoners under the age of 18, who were held without charges and tried without the right of defense. The New York Times reported at the time that there were 95 Palestinian women and 313 Palestinian children in Israeli jails. Israel rejected the offer.

Two days later, on 28 June 2006, Israel launched Operation Summer Rains. In addition various international bodies conducted diplomatic activity, among them Egypt, in an attempt to release Shalit. Due to the fact that Shalit was a French citizen, France attempted to get him released through diplomatic means. However, the captors, who operated under the orders of Khaled Mashal and the Hamas military leadership, refused to release him. According to David Siegel, a spokesman at the Israeli embassy in Washington, D.C., "Israel did everything it could in exhausting all diplomatic options and gave Mahmoud Abbas the opportunity to return the abducted Israeli... This operation can be terminated immediately, conditioned on the release of Gilad Shalit."

On the night of 28–29 June 2006, the IDF arrested dozens of Hamas leaders in the West bank, including 20 Palestinian parliament members and eight Palestinian ministers. This retaliation operation was reportedly planned several weeks in advance. On the same day, four Israeli Air Force aircraft flew over Syrian President Bashar Assad's palace in Latakia, as an IDF spokesperson said that Israel views the Syrian leadership as a sponsor of Hamas.

On 1 July 2006, Shalit's captors issued another demand to the Israelis, demanding that Israel release an additional 1,000 Palestinian prisoners (in addition to all female and young prisoners, as previously demanded) and end Israel's incursions into Gaza. Two days later, the captors issued a 24-hour ultimatum for meeting their demands, threatening unspecified consequences if Israel refused. Hours after the ultimatum was issued, Israel officially rejected the demands, stating that: "there will be no negotiations to release prisoners".

On 3 July 2006 Shalit's captors made an ultimatum according to which they demanded that Israel must fulfill all of its demands by 4 July 2006 at 6:00 am. However, the captors did not specify exactly what would happen if the demands were not met. The Israeli Prime Minister's office formally rejected the ultimatum. After the ultimatum period expired the Army of Islam group announced that no more information would be released about Shalit's fate.

Operation Summer Rains, which failed to achieve its main objective (the release of Shalit), ended on 26 November 2006 when the Israeli prime minister Ehud Olmert and Palestinian Authority President Mahmoud Abbas agreed on a cease-fire, after the Palestinian militant organizations agreed to stop firing rockets on Sderot and after Israel agreed to cease IDF operations in the Gaza Strip.

== Aftermath ==
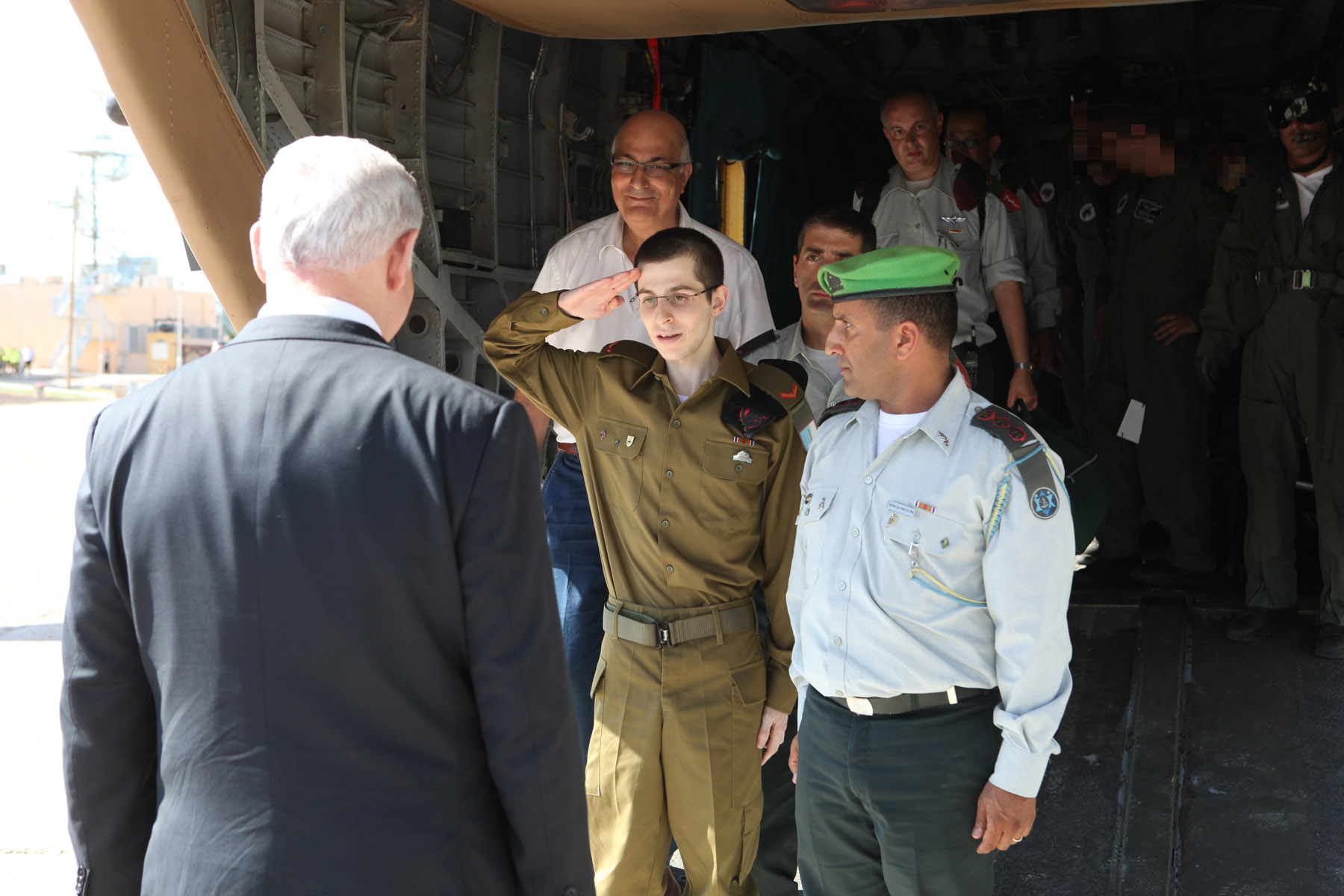
After more than five years in Hamas captivity, IDF soldier Gilad Shalit was released and returned to Israel, while nearly a thousand Palestinian and Arab-Israeli prisoners are being released in exchange, 18 October 2011.

Hamas high-ranking commander Abu Jibril Shimali, whom Israel considers responsible for coordinating the abduction of Shalit, was killed during the violent clashes between Hamas and the al-Qaida-affiliated Jund Ansar Allah organization in Gaza in August 2009.

On 2 October 2009, Israel received a video clip of 2:42 minutes length in which Gilad Shalit was filmed. In exchange, Israel released 20 Palestinian prisoners. During the same day the video clip was broadcast on television channels worldwide. The video, which was published publicly after the Shalit family approval to do so, showed Gilad Shalit in uniform reading a pre-written message, in which he urged the Israeli government to finalize the deal for his release. In addition, during the video clip Shalit stood up for a few seconds and moved towards the camera so that his health condition would be evident in the video, as much as possible. In addition, during the video clip Shalit was holding an Arab newspaper from 14 September 2009 in order to prove that the video was recorded just before its release.

Shalit was released in a prisoner exchange on 18 October 2011. The Hamas commander who directed the raid, Raed al Atar, was killed in an Israeli airstrike during the 2014 Israel–Gaza conflict.

== Official reactions ==
Involved parties

Israel:

- Israeli Prime Minister Ehud Olmert stated that Israel held the Palestinian Authority, the Hamas government and President Mahmoud Abbas "responsible for this event – with all this implies."
- Chief of Staff of the Israel Defense Forces Lt. Gen. Dan Halutz stated that "The Palestinians are responsible for the fate of the kidnapped soldier, and we will do everything in our power to retrieve him."

Palestinian Authority:

- Palestinian Authority President Mahmoud Abbas condemned the attack and stated that "We have always warned against the danger of certain groups or factions leaving the national consensus and carrying out operations for which the Palestinian people will always have to pay the price". In addition Abbas called on the international community "to prevent Israel from exploiting the attack to carry out large-scale aggression in the Gaza Strip".
- Ghazi Hamad, the spokesman of the Hamas government in Gaza, called for Shalit's captors "to protect his life and treat him well" and called on Israel "not to escalate the situation".

International

- United States – The US state department released a statement saying: "We urge both sides to exercise restraint and avoid steps which further escalate the situation".

== See also ==
- Gilad Shalit
- Israeli–Palestinian conflict
- Palestinian political violence
- 2006 Hezbollah cross-border raid
- Abduction and killing of Nachshon Wachsman
- Israeli war crimes
