= Khan Yunis refugee camp =

Refugee camp in Khan Yunis, Gaza, State of Palestine

Khan Yunis Camp مخيم خان يونس
- Refugee Camp
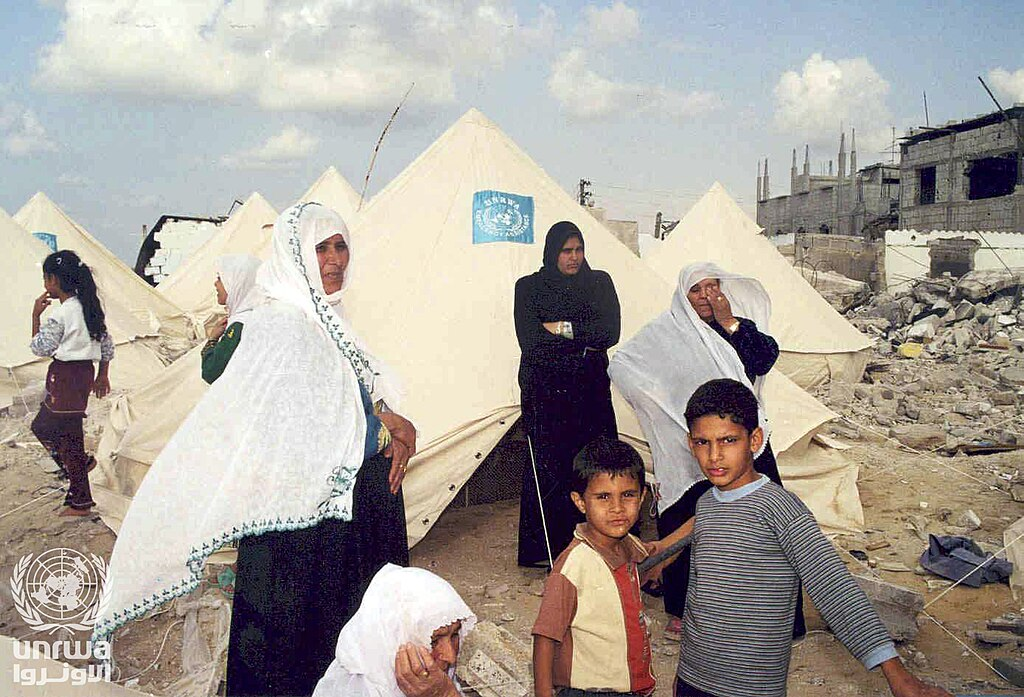
- Khan Yunis refugee camp in 2001
- Interactive map of Khan Yunis Camp
- Coordinates: 31°20′54″N 34°17′38″E
- State: State of Palestine
- Governorate: Khan Yunis
- Founded: 1948

Government
  - Type: Refugee Camp
  - Control: Hamas

Population (2023)
  - Total: 95,550

The Khan Yunis refugee camp, (Note: Also spelled Khan Younis or Khan Yunus) also called Khan Yunis Camp (Arabic: مخيم خان يونس), is a Palestinian refugee camp in the Khan Yunis Governorate just west of the city of Khan Yunis and two kilometers east of the Mediterranean coast in the southern Gaza Strip. While UNRWA states that there were approximately 95,550 Palestinian refugees living in the camp in 2023, the Palestinian Central Bureau of Statistics recorded a population of 41,182 in the 2017 census.

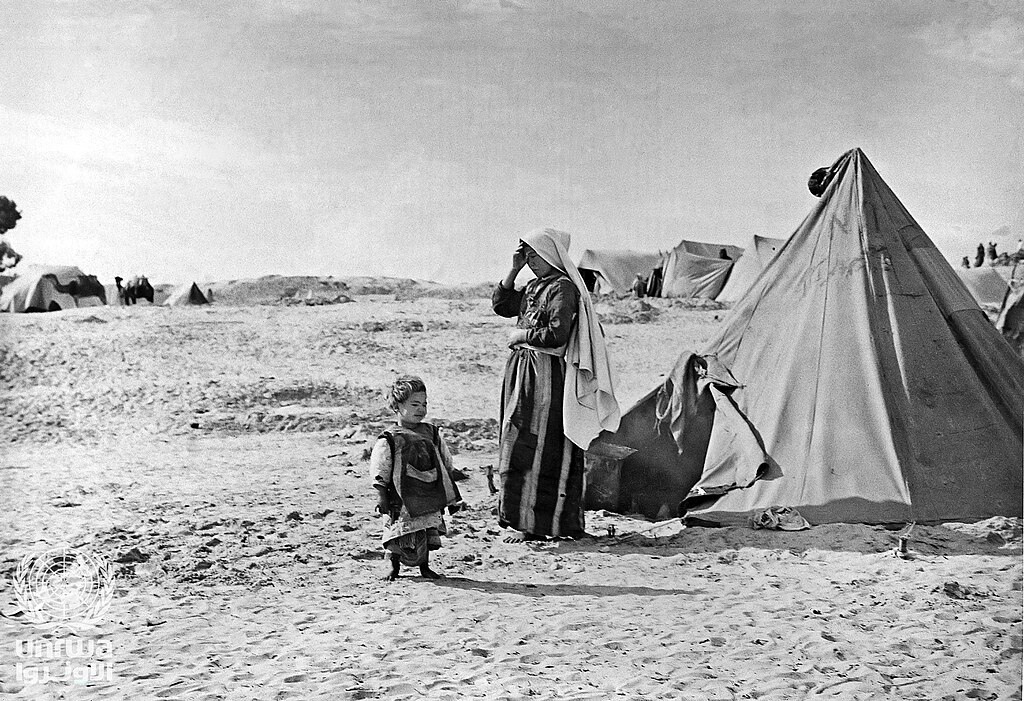
A mother and child in the newly established refugee camp, 1948

The Khan Yunis refugee camp was established after the 1948 Arab–Israeli War, accommodating roughly 35,000 Palestinian refugees, who fled or were expelled by Zionist militias from their homes.

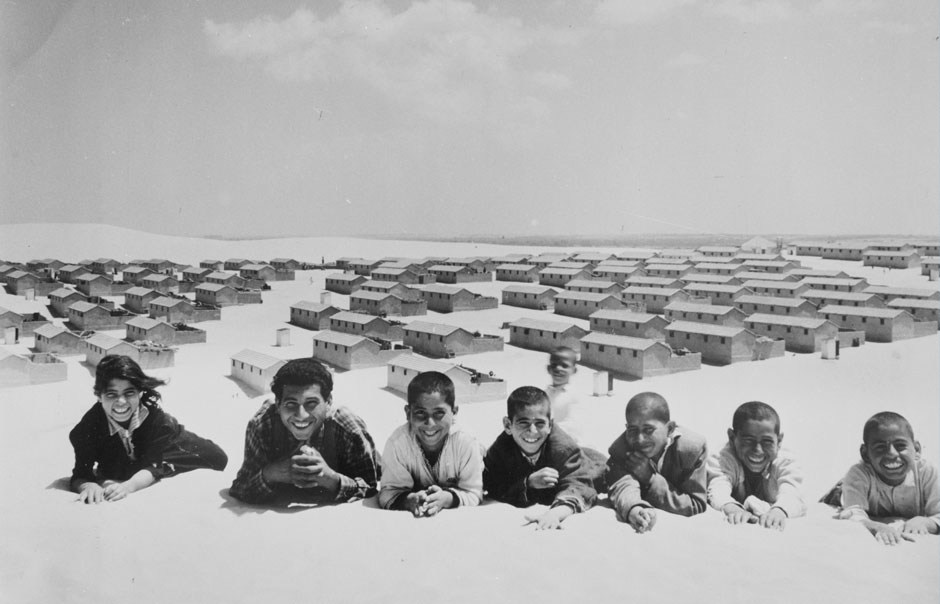
Children in front of the Khan Yunis refugee camp in 1955

On 3 November 1956, the camp and city of Khan Yunis were occupied by the Israel Defense Forces. In the ensuing operation, about 275 Palestinians were killed by Israeli forces, including 140 refugees from the camp, in what became known as the Khan Yunis massacre. Residents state that most of the casualties occurred after hostilities had ended, with the army searching houses for suspected armed men. However, Israeli authorities stated the casualties were a result of resistance by the camp's residents.

According to UNRWA, many of the camp's residents have lost their homes as a result of operations by the Israeli military. UNRWA began reconstruction efforts in the early 2000s, but work has largely been halted due to the blockade imposed by Israel on the Gaza Strip following the Hamas takeover of the territory. UNRWA says that at least 10,000 homes need to be constructed.

== Notable residents ==
- Mohammed Assaf
- Mohammed Deif
- Yahya Sinwar
- Mohammed Sinwar
