= Salah Shehade =

Palestinian militant and political leader (1953–2002)

- صلاح شحادة

5th Commander of the Izz al-Din al-Qassam Brigades
- In office September–December 1998 – 22 July 2002
- Preceded by: Adel Awadallah
- Succeeded by: Mohammed Deif

Personal details
- Born: 24 February 1953 Beit Hanoun, Gaza
- Died: 22 July 2002 (aged 49) Gaza City, Gaza
- Party: Hamas
- Occupation: Military commander, politician

Salah Mustafa Muhammad Shehade (or Shehadeh, Shahadeh; Arabic: صلاح شحادة; 24 February 1953 – 22 July 2002) was a Palestinian militant and political leader who was a member of the Islamist movement Hamas. He led the Izz ad-Din al-Qassam Brigades military wing of Hamas, until his assassination by Israel.

== Activities ==
Born in Gaza and a member of Hamas since the formation of the group in 1987, Shehade quickly became one of its most influential leaders. He was arrested twice by Israeli authorities in 1984 and 1988. After Yahya Ayash's death, in 1996, Shehade became a top leader in the group, along with Mohammed Deif and Adnan al-Ghoul.

During the Al-Aqsa Intifada, Israel accused Shehade of masterminding several attacks against both Israeli soldiers and civilians in the Gaza Strip and in Israel proper. He was given a twelve-year prison sentence but was released on 14 May 2000. It was reported that Shehade was involved in the production of Qassam rockets, fired against Israeli civilian targets, and other homemade weapons, as well as smuggling military equipment into Gaza.

Shehade led the Izz ad-Din al-Qassam Brigades military wing of Hamas during a period which saw a campaign of suicide attacks against Israeli civilian targets which caused the deaths of hundreds of Israeli civilians. As the leader of the Hamas military wing, he oversaw Hamas field commanders in Gaza and the West Bank and defined the policy of terror attacks by Hamas.

== Assassination ==
On 22 July 2002, the Israel Defense Forces targeted the house in which Shehade was living, using a one-ton bomb dropped by an F-16 plane in a quarter in the al-Daraj neighborhood of Gaza City. Eight houses were completely destroyed, nine partially destroyed and another twenty were damaged. Fifteen people were killed, including Shehade, his wife and daughter, as well as seven members of the Matar family who lived in the next door. Seven children were among the dead. Between 50 and 150 were injured as a result of the attack.

Twenty-seven reserve pilots, including Iftach Spector, signed a pilots' letter refusing to fly assassination sorties over Gaza and the West Bank in protest of the operation.

=== Reaction ===
The attack received widespread condemnation from other Middle Eastern nations, Western Europe, and the United States. Ariel Sharon initially praised it as "one of our greatest successes", but later told Yediot Ahronot that "[H]ad I known the outcome, I would have postponed the assassination." Hady Amr wrote: "150 million children and youth in the Arab World now have televisions, and they will never, never forget what the Israeli people, the Israeli military and Israeli democracy have done to Palestinian children."

==== Legal responses ====
Human rights organizations around the world, including in Israel, severely criticized the attack, proclaiming that the intentional dropping of a one-ton bomb in the middle of the night on a dense civilian neighborhood is tantamount to a war crime. The Gush Shalom movement also threatened to turn the pilot over to the International Court of Justice in The Hague. Israeli Air Force chief Dan Halutz, who was abroad during the bombing itself but was still accountable as IAF commander, gave an interview to Haaretz, published on 21 August 2002. To his pilots he said:

[To pilots] Guys, ... you can sleep well at night. I also sleep well by the way. You aren't the ones who choose the targets, and you were not the ones who chose the target in this particular case. You are not responsible for the contents of the target. Your execution was perfect. Superb. And I repeat again: There is no problem here that concerns you. You did exactly what you were instructed to do. You did not deviate from that by so much as a millimeter to the right or to the left. And anyone who has a problem with that is invited to see me.

When asked whether the operation was morally wrong because of the toll on some civilians, Halutz answered that the planning included moral consideration and that a mistake or an accident did not make it such. When the reporter asked about the feelings of a pilot when he drops a bomb, Halutz answered:

No. That is not a legitimate question and it is not asked. But if you nevertheless want to know what I feel when I release a bomb, I will tell you: I feel a light bump to the plane as a result of the bomb's release. A second later it's gone, and that's all. That is what I feel.

In the same interview Halutz denounced the left-wing groups who attacked the pilots and called to have them tried for "treason":

Is this the public for which the Israel Defense Forces is fighting day in and day out? All those bleeding hearts who have the gall to use Mafioso methods of blackmail against fighters – I don't recall that they ever threatened to turn over one of the arch-terrorists, the terrorists who have killed many Israeli civilians, to The Hague. What I have to say about those people is that this is a democracy, where everyone can always express his opinion. But not to be a traitor.

[Interviewer] Are you suggesting that members of the Gush Shalom ("Peace Bloc") group who made those comments should be placed on trial for treason?

[Halutz] We have to find the right clause in the law and place them on trial in Israel. Yes. You wanted to talk to me about morality, and I say that a state that does not protect itself is acting immorally. A state that does not back up its fighters will not survive. Happily, the State of Israel does back up its fighters. This vocal but negligible minority brings to mind dark times in the history of the Jewish people, when a minority among us went and informed on another part of the nation. That must not happen again. Who would have believed that pilots of the air force would find their cars spray-painted with savage graffiti because of a mission they carried out?

Following the assassination, the Israel Defense Forces and Shin Bet established a joint inquiry into the incident and submitted their findings to Defense Minister Binyamin Ben-Eliezer on 2 August 2002. The inquiry concluded that the procedures and operational assessments followed in the operation were "correct and professional", and that the operation resulted in the elimination of a "major terrorist leader". However, the inquiry found shortcomings in the intelligence available and the analysis of intelligence concerning the presence of civilians near Shehade. The inquiry found that if the intelligence had indicated with certainty the presence of civilians in Shehade's vicinity, the timing or method of the action would have been changed, "as was done a number of times in the past."

In December 2005, a class-action lawsuit was filed by the Center for Constitutional Rights, naming former Shin Bet director Avraham Dichter, the military chief in charge of the operation, as the sole defendant. Referring in particular to the Shehade killing, the lawsuit alleges that Dichter "developed, implemented and escalated the practice of targeted killings", Citing the killing of more than 300 Palestinian leaders and casualties among hundreds of bystanders, the suit claims that assassination is illegal under international law.

In 2007, the Israeli State Prosecutor's Office announced that an independent commission of inquiry into the death of the 14 innocent Palestinian civilians would be held following a petition by Yesh Gvul. Headed by Zvi Inbar, this commission began in February 2008. Its findings were officially released to the public in February 2011, and found "intelligence gathering failure" and "no premeditated intention to kill civilians," reporting that commanders did not know there were innocent people in the building at the time, and that they would have called it off had they known.

In January 2009, the National Audience, a special and exceptional high court in Spain, began a war crimes probe into the attack that killed Shehade, with persons investigated including Mofaz, Dichter, Binyamin Ben-Eliezer, Moshe Ya'alon, Doron Almog, Giora Eiland and Mike Herzog. A lower court decision ordered an inquiry into the Shehadeh killing. The Spanish Court of Appeals rejected the lower court's decision, and on appeal in April 2010 the Supreme Court of Spain upheld the Court of Appeals decision against conducting an official inquiry into the IDF's targeted killing of Shehadeh in 2002. Israeli MK Moshe Ya'alon (Chief of Staff at the time of the bombing) cancelled a trip to the United Kingdom on 5 October 2009, because he feared an arrest on war crimes charges relating to the 2002 killing.

== See also ==
- Emad Akel
- Yahya Ayyash
- List of Israeli civilian casualties in the Second Intifada (partial list)
