= Gaza Strip under Hamas =

De facto government in the Gaza Strip

Hamas government in Gaza حكومة حماس في قطاع غزة
- Flag Coat of arms

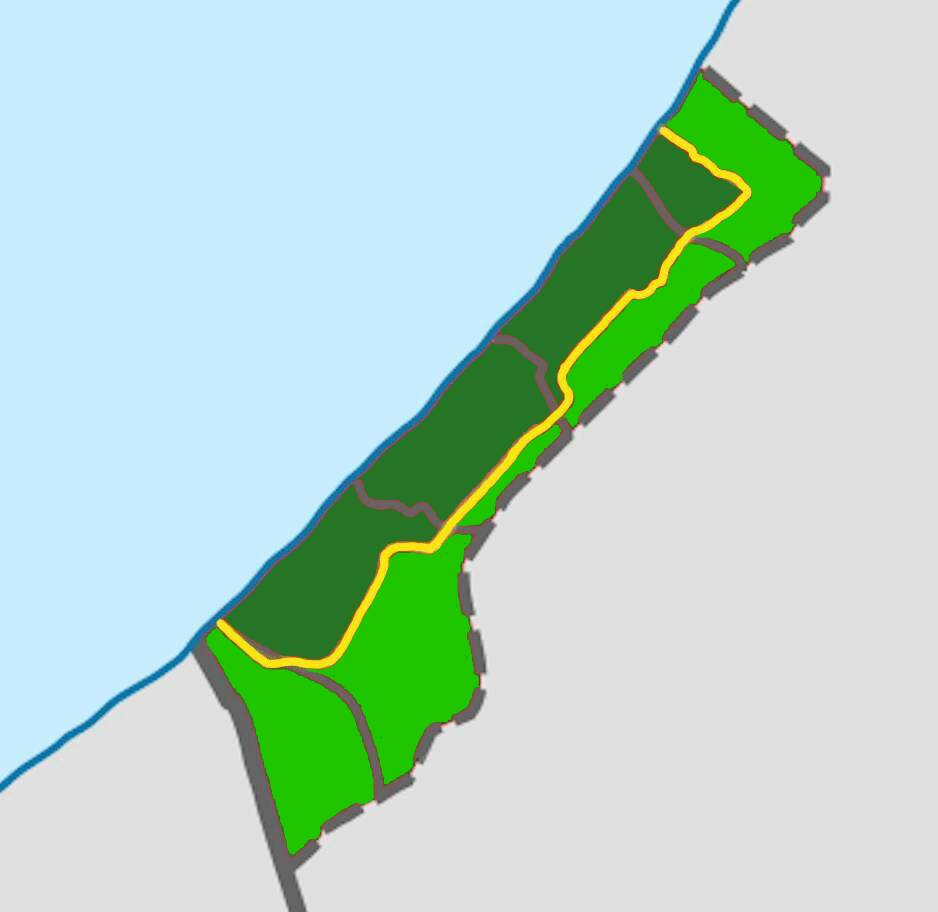
- Hamas-controlled Gaza after 10 October 2025: Territory controlled by Hamas (Note: The Gaza Strip experienced a widespread societal breakdown during the war that resulted in the near-collapse of Hamas rule and the emergence of a power vacuum filled by various armed groups. Immediately following the 10 October 2025 ceasefire, Hamas worked to reassert its authority and initiated a widespread crackdown on local anti-Hamas armed groups west of the Yellow Line. By 21 October, the IDF evaluated that Hamas had reestablished political and security control in its portion of Gaza down to the municipal level and had effectively eliminated those rival groups.) Claimed territory contested between Hamas and Israel and anti-Hamas militias (Note: Namely the Popular Forces, the Popular Army – Northern Forces, the Counter-Terrorism Strike Force, and the Shuja'iyya Popular Defense Forces) Yellow Line
- Status: de jure under the Palestinian Authority; de facto contested, with c. 60% of the Gaza Strip under Israeli military occupation
- Capital: Gaza City
- Official languages: Arabic
- Religion: 99% Sunni Islam (official); <1% Christianity
- Government: Authoritarian one-party Islamist state under a dictatorship
- Hamas Leader in the Gaza Strip
  - 2007–2017: Ismail Haniyeh
  - 2017–2024: Yahya Sinwar
  - 2024–2025: Vacant
  - 2025: Mohammad Sinwar
  - 2025: Vacant
  - 2025–2026: Izz al-Din al-Haddad
  - 2026: Vacant
  - 2026: Mohammed Odeh
  - 2026–present: Vacant (Note: Ali al-Amoudi is the chief of Hamas political bureau in Gaza)
- Head of state
  - 2007: Mahmoud Abbas
  - 2007–2009: None
  - 2009–2014: Aziz Dweik
  - 2014–present: Mahmoud Abbas
- Head of government
  - 2007–2017: Ismail Haniyeh
  - 2017–2019: Yahya Sinwar
  - 2019–2021: Mohammad Awad
  - 2021–2024: Rawhi Mushtaha (acting)
  - 2021–2025: Issam al-Da'alis
  - 2025–present: Vacant (Note: During the Gaza war, Palestinian factions held intra-Palestinian talks in October 2024 where they agreed on a plan for a "Community Support Committee" to govern Gaza. After former head of government Issam al-Da'alis was killed on 18 March 2025 during the Gaza war, his post was left vacant, with Hamas envisioning that the committee would assume government affairs. This proposal later materialized into the National Committee for the Administration of Gaza.)
- Establishment: Palestinian internal political violence (Fatah–Hamas conflict)
- History
  - Battle of Gaza: 7–15 June 2007 (Note: 1. Central and northern Gaza under control of Hamas on 11 June 2007.; 2. The central Gaza Strip becomes a military zone by the Hamas on 12 June 2007.; 3. Most of Gaza under control of the Hamas as 13 June 2007.; 4. Establishment of first government on 14 June 2007 and almost complete control over Gaza.; 5. Hamas took over all of Gaza on 15 June 2007.)
  - First Gaza War: 27 December 2008–18 January 2009
  - Jund Ansar Allah revolt in Rafah: 14–15 August 2009
  - 2012 Gaza War: 14–21 November 2012
  - 2014 Gaza War: 8 July–26 August 2014
  - 2021 Israel–Palestine crisis: 6–21 May 2021
  - October 7 attacks: 7 October 2023
  - Gaza peace plan signed: 9 October 2025

Area
  - Total: 365 km^{2} (141 sq mi)

Population
  - 2021 estimate: 2,141,643
- Currency: Israeli new shekel Egyptian pound
- Time zone: UTC+2 (Palestine Standard Time)
  - Summer (DST): UTC+3 (Palestine Summer Time)
- Calling code: +970, +972
Preceded by	Succeeded by
Palestinian Authority	Gaza Strip under Resolution 2803

The Gaza Strip is governed by Hamas which assumed control of the territory on 11 June 2007 after seizing it from the rival Fatah-controlled Palestinian Authority (PA). The Hamas administration was first led by Ismail Haniyeh from June 2007 until February 2017; then by Yahya Sinwar until his killing in October 2024; then by Mohammed Sinwar until his assassination in May 2025; then by Izz al-Din al-Haddad until his assassination in May 2026; then by Mohammed Odeh until his assassination the same month. During the Gaza war, the group lost control over most of the Gaza Strip to the Israel Defense Forces (IDF). As a result of the Gaza peace plan, agreed in October 2025, the IDF currently controls approximately 53% of the territory, and Hamas is set to hand over power to the National Committee for the Administration of Gaza, as endorsed by United Nations Security Council Resolution 2803.

After Hamas won the Palestinian legislative elections on 25 January 2006, Ismail Haniyeh was nominated as the prime minister of the PA, establishing a national unity government with Fatah. This government effectively collapsed with the outbreak of the violent conflict between Hamas and Fatah. After the full takeover of the Gaza Strip by Hamas on 15 June 2007, PA president Mahmoud Abbas dismissed the Hamas-led government and appointed Salam Fayyad as prime minister. Though the new Palestinian government's authority was claimed to extend to both the Palestinian territories, in effect it became limited to the West Bank, as Hamas did not recognize the dismissal and continued to rule the Gaza Strip as an effectively separate administration from the PA. There have been reconciliation attempts between Fatah and Hamas since the 2007 split; a brief Palestinian unity government in 2014 failed to organize elections and reunify the Palestinian territories. A third government was formed by Hamas in October 2016.

Since Hamas assumed control over the Gaza Strip, it has engaged in multiple wars with Israel, including those in 2008, 2012, 2014, and an ongoing one since 2023. Hamas lost control of the majority of the Strip in early June 2025, amidst Operation Gideon's Chariots. Hamas has also come into conflict with rival Islamist factions in Gaza that adhere to Salafi-jihadism. Examples include the 2009 revolt of Jund Ansar Allah against Hamas in Rafah, and the 2011 Hamas crackdown on Tawhid al-Jihad after the latter's murder of Vittorio Arrigoni. On 6 July 2026, Hamas announced a proposal for the resignation of its civil administration under the Gaza peace plan, though this did not include the military wing of Hamas and was judged to be unlikely to result in notable change to Gaza. On 31 July 2026, US president Donald Trump announced that his Board of Peace had reached an agreement to disarm Hamas and other militant organisations in Gaza. Hamas leader Ghazi Hamad declared that the "draft agreement" calls for transferring heavy weaponry in Gaza to a Palestinian administration after an Israeli withdrawal.

== History ==
=== Prelude to division ===
Conflict between Fatah and Hamas began simmering when Hamas won the Palestinian legislative elections in January 2006. Israel and the Quartet—comprising the United States, the European Union, Russia and the United Nations—demanded that the new Hamas government accept all previous agreements, recognize Israel's right to exist, and renounce violence; when Hamas refused, they cut off aid to the Palestinian Authority.

Major conflict erupted in Gaza in December 2006, when the Hamas executive authority attempted to replace the Palestinian police as the primary authority in Gaza.

On 8 February 2007, Saudi-sponsored negotiations in Mecca produced an agreement on a Palestinian national unity government. The agreement was signed by Mahmoud Abbas on behalf of Fatah and Khaled Mashal on behalf of Hamas. The new government was called on to achieve Palestinian national goals as approved by the Palestine National Council, the clauses of the Basic Law and the National Reconciliation Document (the "Prisoners' Document") as well as the decisions of the Arab summit.

In March 2007, the Palestinian Legislative Council approved formation a national unity government with 83–3 vote. Government ministers were sworn in by Abbas, the president on the Palestinian National Authority, at ceremonies held in Gaza and Ramallah. In June that year, Hamas took control of the Gaza Strip from the national unity government after forcing out Fatah.

On 14 June 2007, Abbas announced the dissolution of the former unity government and declared a state of emergency. He dismissed Ismail Haniyeh as prime minister and appointed Salam Fayyad in his place, giving him the task of building a new government. Nonetheless, Hamas rejected the decree of Abbas and said the Ismail Haniyeh government would remain in office and continue to function as the government of the Palestinian National Authority.

=== June 2007 Hamas government ===
==== Takeover by Hamas ====
With Hamas in control of the Gaza Strip and Fatah in control of the West Bank, there were two de facto governments in the Palestinian territories, each claiming to be the legitimate government of the Palestinian people. On 14 June 2007, Abbas dismissed the Hamas-dominated PA government of March 2007, but Haniyye refused to accept the dismissal and declared the formation of a new Hamas government in June 2007, as West Bank resident Ministers in the Palestinian government were deposed by Fatah.

Palestinian police chief Kamal el-Sheikh ordered his men in the Gaza Strip not to work or obey Hamas orders. However, many Fatah members fled the Gaza Strip to the West Bank, and Fatah gunmen stormed Hamas-led institutions in the West Bank after the Battle of Gaza.

Palestinian legislator Saeb Erekat said the PA officially has no control in the Gaza Strip. Hamas and Fatah accused each other of a coup d'état, with neither recognizing the authority of the other government.

The United States, EU, and Israel have not recognized the Hamas government, but support Palestinian president Mahmoud Abbas and Prime Minister Salam Fayyad's government in the West Bank. The Arab League called on all parties to stop the fighting and return the government to its status before the Battle of Gaza, which would be the 2007 unity government and not the new PA government appointed by Abbas. Although the United States does not officially recognize the Hamas government, it holds it "fully and entirely responsible for the Gaza Strip," United States Assistant Secretary of State Sean McCormack said.

On 16 June 2007, Haniyeh declared Said Fanuna (officially a Fatah general who, in reality, distanced himself from Abbas) as the new security chief in the Gaza Strip, stating him as a "higher police command" than the West Bank-based police chief Kamal el-Sheikh of the Fatah.

==== Internal and external conflicts ====
After the division of the two Palestinian parties, the West Bank remained relatively quiet, but the Gaza Strip was the scene of constant conflict between Hamas and various other rival Islamist factions opposed to the Hamas government. The 2008–2009 Gaza war between Hamas and Israel also occurred during this time.

In 2009, a radical Salafist cleric declared an "Islamic Emirate" in Gaza, accusing Hamas of failing to implement full Sharia law. The radicalization of the Gaza Strip and attempt to undermine Hamas authority resulted in the 2009 Hamas crackdown on Jund Ansar Allah, an Al-Qaeda affiliated group, that lasted two days and resulted in 22 deaths.

Reports in March 2010 suggested that Ahmed Jabari described the security situation in Gaza as deteriorating, and that Hamas was starting to lose control. Nevertheless, the Hamas continued to exercise authority.

In April 2011, Hamas conducted another crackdown, this one on a Salafist group reportedly involved in Vittorio Arrigoni's murder.

In March 2019, Gaza witnessed widespread protests, reflecting dissatisfaction with the severe living conditions, which were marked by a 70% unemployment rate among young people. The scale and intensity of the protests were unprecedented since Hamas assumed full control of Gaza in 2007. In response, Hamas took harsh measures: Dozens of individuals, including activists, journalists, and human rights workers, have been beaten, arrested and subjected to home raids.

==== During the Arab Spring ====
Hamas praised the Arab Spring, but its offices in Damascus were directly affected by the Syrian Civil War. Hamas leader Khaled Mashal eventually relocated to Jordan, and Hamas began to distance itself from the Syrian government in the backdrop of the Syrian civil war. The evacuation of Hamas offices from Damascus may be the principal reason for the Doha ratification agreement signed by Abbas and Mashal, but it was also suggested that this was done due to a rift between Hamas Government in Gaza and the external Hamas office, led by Mashal. Essentially, the Doha deal does not reflect any real reconciliation among the factions of the Hamas Government.

Following the events of the 2011 Egyptian Revolution, and the consequent election of an Islamist president in Egypt, Hamas relations with Egypt improved, and in 2012 Egypt eased the permit requirements for Palestinians from Gaza entering through the Rafah crossing. In July 2012, reports circulated that the Hamas Government was considering declaring the independence of the Gaza Strip with the help of Egypt.

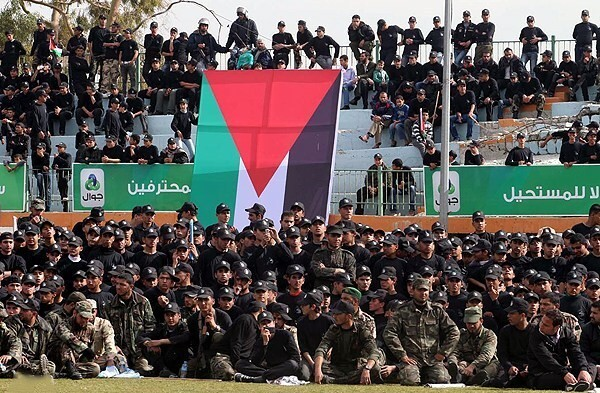
The al-Qassam Brigades (Hamas' armed wing) in Gaza City, 2013

=== September 2012 Hamas government ===
In September 2012, Ismail Haniyeh, head of the Hamas government in Gaza, announced a cabinet reshuffle, appointing seven new ministers including a new finance minister. Haniyeh said the reshuffle was "normal procedure after nearly six years of work by some ministers and in order to achieve specific goals for the current period."

Haniyeh said he had postponed carrying out the cabinet reshuffle several times to allow time for a reconciliation process between Fatah and Hamas to succeed. The two sides have been trying to implement the terms of an April 2011 reconciliation deal for months now, but appear no closer to achieving either the consensus interim government or the legislative and presidential elections called for by the agreement. In May 2012, a new Fatah government appointment in the West Bank angered the Hamas government in Gaza, which slammed the decision to form a new cabinet, accusing Abbas' Palestinian Authority and the Fatah movement he heads of abandoning reconciliation.

=== 2016 Hamas administration ===
The Hamas government of 2016 is the third de facto Hamas government in the Gaza Strip since the Hamas takeover of the Gaza Strip in 2007. On 17 October 2016 it as announced that the Supreme Administrative Committee, which is in charge of the conduct of Gaza's ministries, had carried out a Cabinet reshuffle in active ministries and a change the positions of 16 deputy ministers and directors general in government institutions. The new administration was composed of Deputy Ministers, Directors General and other high-level officials, not directly bound to the Ramallah administration. It was initially speculated that the 2016 Hamas government was an attempt to return Ismail Haniyeh to full control of the Gaza Strip. As part of the government changes, the Ministry of Planning was abolished.

According to some views, the third Hamas cabinet de facto succeeded the failed 2014 national unity government, which was reshuffled by Palestinian president Mahmud Abbas in July 2015 without Hamas consent and was announced by Hamas as expired on 19 October 2016. "Coalition for Accountability and Integrity – Aman" said that the formation of this committee was a declaration of a new government in the Gaza Strip. Youssef Mahmoud, the spokesman for the consensus Palestinian government, said that every action made in Gaza without the consensus government's approval is illegitimate and not recognized by the Ramallah government. Ismail Haniyeh, the Prime Minister of the 2007 and 2012 Hamas-led governments, considers the 2015 Fatah-dominated government in Ramallah as illegitimate. The Hamas government of 2016 exercises de facto rule over the Gaza Strip, supported by the Palestinian Legislative Council, which is dominated by members of Hamas.

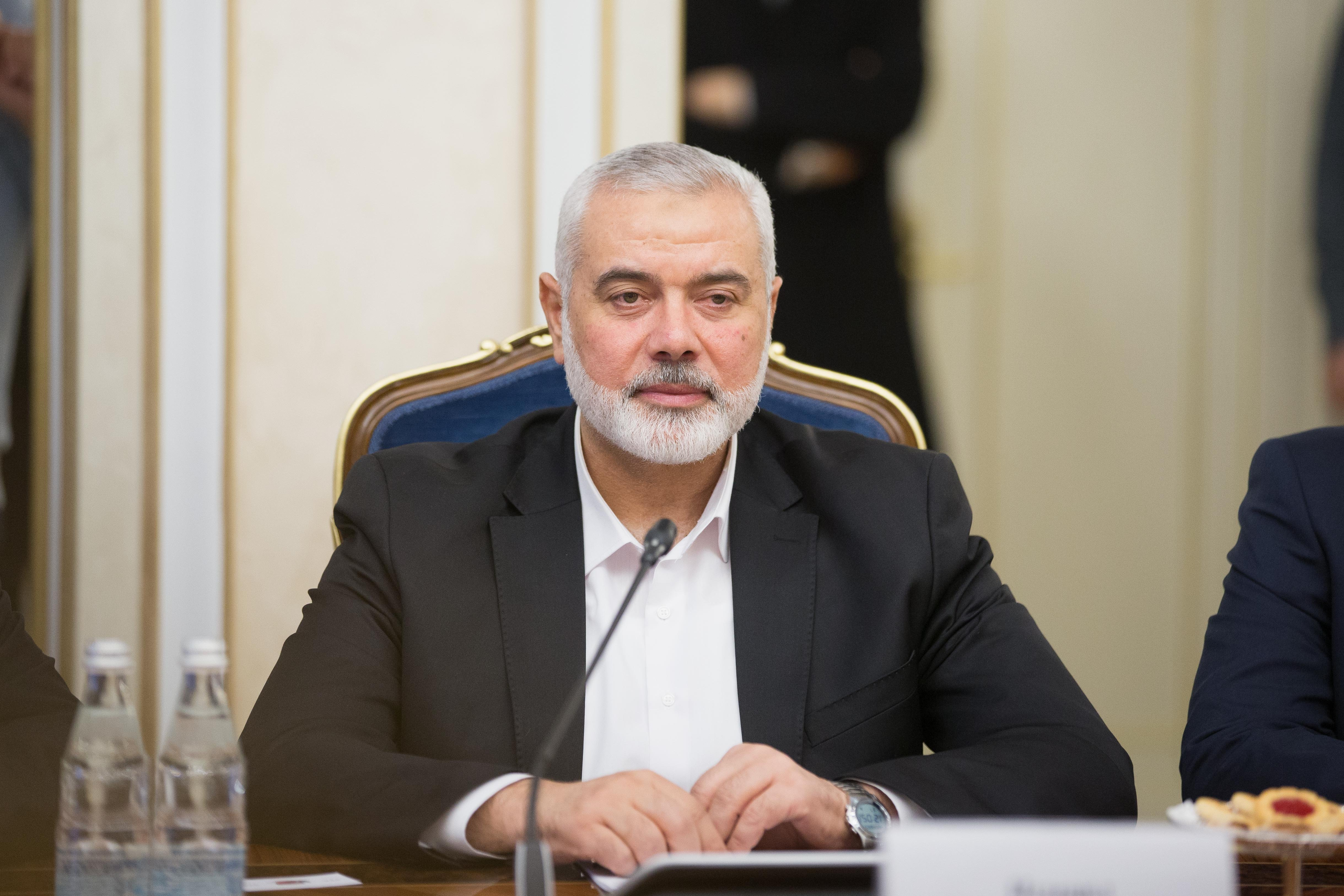
Hamas leader Ismail Haniyeh at a meeting in Moscow, 2020

In March 2017, the Fatah dominated government in the West Bank expressed its concern that the Gaza administration is being upgraded by Hamas into a full-fledged 'shadow government'. Further in April and May 2017, Abbas vowed to take unprecedented measures to end the division – cutting 30–50% of Gaza Strip-based employees of the Palestinian administration, suspending social assistance to 630 families and preventing Gazan cancer patients from reaching treatment in Jerusalem or Israeli hospitals. In addition, Ramallah-based government stopped paying for Gazan electricity bills to Israel and on 28 April Abbas approved early retirement of 35,000 military personnel in Gaza (originally funded by the Ramallah administration) and cut financial aid to former Hamas prisoners.

On 14 June 2021, Hamas announced that Issam al-Da'alis was the new prime minister of the Hamas government in Gaza, succeeding Mohammed Awad who resigned after two years in the position. The PA previously expressed opposition to the formation of a Hamas government in the Gaza Strip. In 2017, Hamas had announced its decision to dismantle the administrative committee it had set up as a de facto government in the Gaza Strip, which was taken to promote reconciliation with the PA.

==== COVID-19 ====
During the COVID-19 pandemic in Palestine Gaza's Ministry of the Interior formed a crisis management team, headed by Hamas police officer Faiq Al-Mabhouh. Mabhouh played a prominent role in communicating with the public about the changing situation. He appeared in video announcements on Al-Aqsa TV and social media channels, and gave interviews to local media to explain changes in restrictions. The Gaza Strip restrictions took the "flattening the curve" approach. The restrictions imposed were similar to most western countries, and more relaxed than the zero COVID policy implemented by China and their neighbors. The Gaza Strip's starter was to avoid total lockdowns using partial measures like weekend lockdowns and curfews. The weekend lockdowns included mosques being closed for Friday prayers. But during times while the mosques were open, one creative measure initiated by Gaza's Health Ministry was to replace the mosque preachers with doctors who gave health information seminars.

=== Gaza war ===
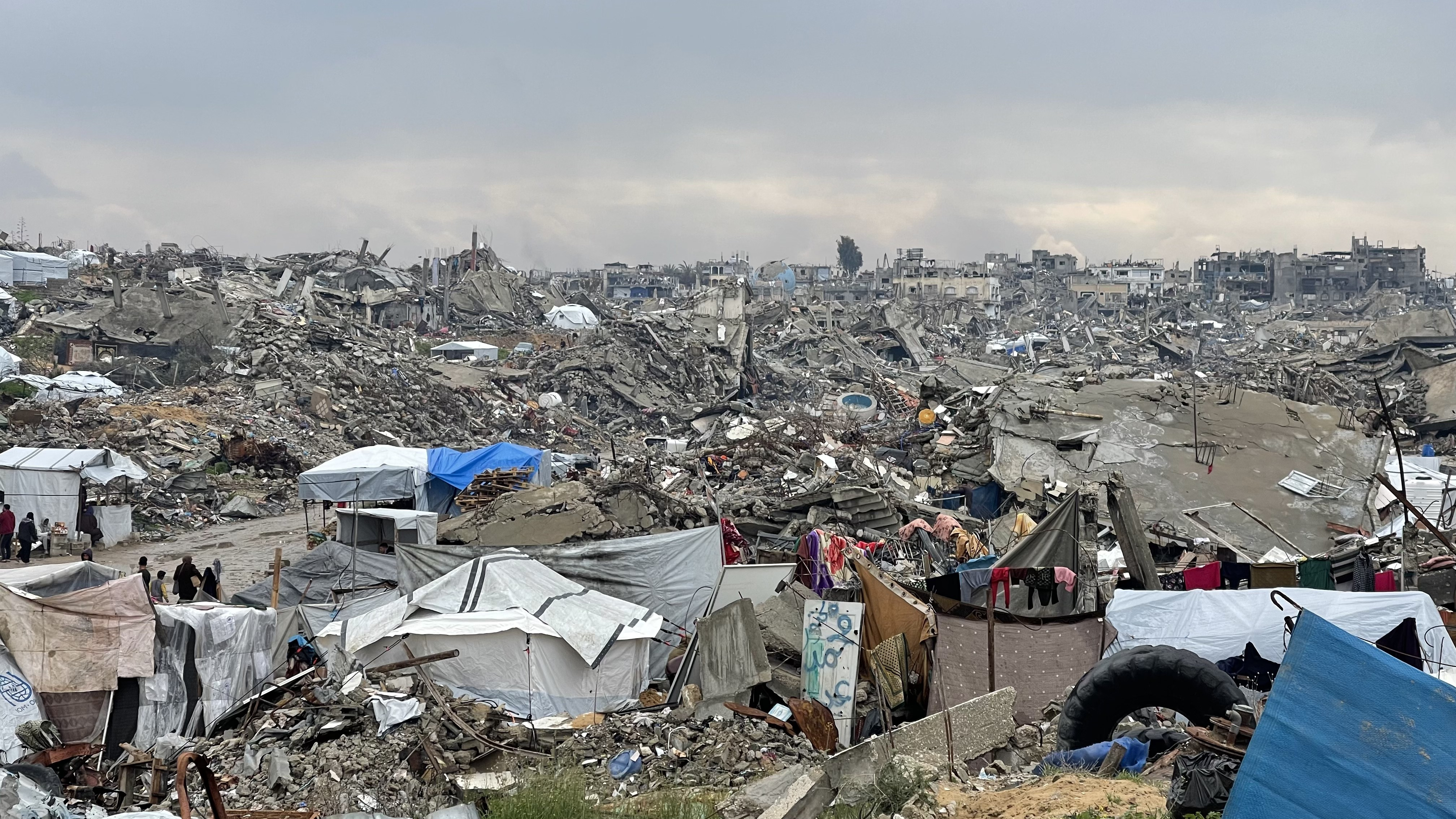
Destruction in Beit Lahia caused by Israeli bombardments, February 2025.

Following the outbreak of the Gaza war and the Israeli invasion of the Gaza Strip in early November 2023, Hamas' complete control of the Gaza Strip was weakened as Israeli forces kept advancing. On 6 January 2024, the Israeli government stated that actual Hamas rule in the northern part of the Gaza Strip was eliminated due to Israeli military advance. By 18 January, the IDF stated that Hamas had begun to rebuild its armies in the occupied parts of Northern Gaza. The IDF had previously stated these armies were stripped of military capabilities but by 18 January the fighting strength of many battalions had been significantly restored. Some change occurred from late January 2024 onward, as it was reported that Hamas managed to revive some of its governing abilities in parts of Gaza city from which Israeli forces withdrew. At the same time, some level of planning for the future governance following that war began by both the Israeli and the US governments. In late December 2023, the Egyptian government proposed the creation of a temporary technocratic Palestinian administration for the Gaza Strip until new Palestinian legislative elections are held. In late February 2024, the Israeli government presented its first official plan for the future control of the Gaza Strip. The possibility of an Israeli military government over the Gaza Strip has also been considered by the Israeli government. Military sources estimated its cost at NIS 20 billion a year. According to media reports, defense minister Yoav Gallant opposed the idea of Israeli military government.

Despite Israeli military advances, parts of the Gaza Strip remained under Hamas control, with Yahya Sinwar remaining in control of some areas until his killing in October 2024. Following the killing, the Hamas temporary committee initially discussed the possibility of appointing a single successor, but eventually opted to rule through the committee until the scheduled Hamas leadership elections in March 2025. In January 2025, a United States–brokered ceasefire went into effect, with Hamas retaining control over the Gaza Strip as the IDF withdrew.

In March 2025, renewed Israeli attacks on Gaza ended the ceasefire. By July 2025, Hamas control over the territory reportedly largely collapsed, with 80% of the Gaza Strip outside its control, and with criminal gangs and armed groups filling the void.

In October 2025, Israel and Hamas accepted the first phase of the Gaza peace plan resulting in a ceasefire and a partial Israeli withdrawal from the Gaza Strip. Hamas reestablished political and security control over its half of Gaza.

In the second phase of the plan it is envisioned that an multinational peacekeeping force be deployed in the Gaza Strip and a Board of Peace and Palestinian Committee be established to administer the Gaza Strip for a transitional period, before turning over governance to a reformed Palestinian Authority. A Civil-Military Coordination Center has been set up to coordinate stabilization and relief efforts in the Gaza Strip in the immediate aftermath of the Gaza War.

On 10 January 2026, Hamas proclaimed that they will abolish the administrative bodies in Gaza.

In May 2026, Nickolay Mladenov urged Hamas to advocate for the things standing in the peace plans. In the same week Hamas spokesman Hazem Qassim, said that the Hamas-run government of Gaza was ready to hand over the administration of the territory to the National Committee. Since May 2026 Hamas reportedly been collecting taxes of up to 30 percent from merchants selling humanitarian aid that enters Gaza. On 6 July, Hamas announced the resignation of its civil administration under the Gaza peace plan. On 31 July, US President Donald Trump said that his Board of Peace had reached an agreement to disarm Hamas and other militant organisations in Gaza. Hamas leader Ghazi Hamad declared that "draft agreement" announced by Trump calls for the transfer of heavy weaponry in Gaza to a Palestinian administration following Israeli withdrawal from Gaza.

== Government and politics ==
In 2006, Hamas won the 2006 Palestinian legislative elections and assumed administrative control of Gaza Strip and West Bank. In 2007, Hamas led a military victory over Fatah, the secular Palestinian nationalist party, which had dominated the Palestinian National Authority. As a result, Palestinian President Mahmoud Abbas declared state of emergency and released Hamas Prime Minister Haniye – a move not recognized by the Hamas party, which de facto continued administration and military control of the Gaza Strip, while in the PNA controlled West Bank another government was established with Fatah domination.

Both regimes – the Ramallah and Gaza government – regard themselves as the sole legitimate government of the Palestinian National Authority. Egyptian-mediated negotiations toward reconciliation between the Fatah and the Hamas government produced a preliminary agreement, planned to be implemented by May 2012 in joint elections. To date, the Hamas government is only economically bonded with the Ramallah-based Palestinian National Authority, performing the governing over the Gaza Strip independently.

Hamas operates three internal security organisations: the General Security Service, Military Intelligence, and the Internal Security Service. The General Security Service is officially part of Hamas's political arm and works to stifle dissent. Military Intelligence is dedicated to obtaining information about Israel, and the Internal Security Service is a part of the interior ministry. The New York Times reported that the General Security Service employed 856 people before the 2023 war.

=== Administrative divisions ===
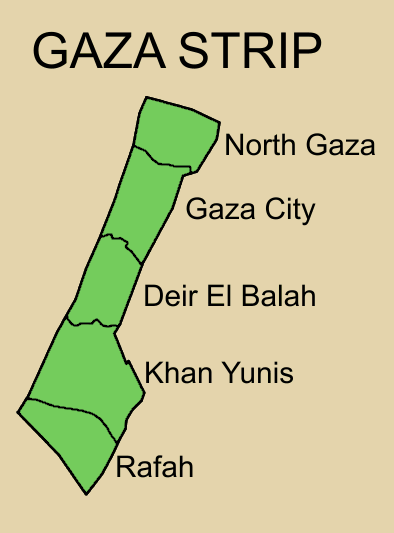
Map showing Gaza governorates

Governorates of the Gaza Strip are five administrative districts:

- Deir al-Balah Governorate
- Gaza Governorate
- Khan Yunis Governorate
- North Gaza Governorate
- Rafah Governorate

After the signing of the Oslo Accords in 1993, the Palestinian territories of the West Bank and Gaza Strip were divided into three areas (Area A, Area B, and Area C) and 16 governorates under the jurisdiction of the Palestinian National Authority. In 2005, Israel withdrew from the Gaza Strip, enlarging the administered Palestinian territories in that region. In 2007, following the War of Brothers in the Gaza Strip between Fatah and Hamas, the latter took over the area and expelled all Palestinian Authority officials, affiliated with Fatah. It has since administered the five districts, including eight cities.

=== Ministries ===
- Ministry of Education
- Ministry of Health
- Ministry of the Waqf / Ministry of Religious Affairs
- Ministry of Foreign
- Ministry of Economic
- Ministry of Finance
- Ministry of Interior and National Security
- Ministry of Justice
- Ministry of Public works
- Ministry of Land Authority
- Ministry of Local Government
- Ministry of Agriculture
- Ministry of Transport
- Ministry of Energy authority
- Ministry of Youth
- Ministry of Tourism
- Ministry of Information and Culture
- Ministry of Planning
- Ministry of Women Affairs
- Ministry of State Affairs
- Ministry of Islamic Endowment / Committee for the Propagation of Virtue and the Prevention of Vice

=== Legality of Hamas rule ===
After Hamas's June 2007 takeover, it ousted Fatah-linked officials from positions of power and authority (such as government positions, security services, universities, newspapers, etc.) and strove to enforce law by progressively removing guns from the hands of peripheral militias, clans, and criminal groups, and gaining control of supply tunnels. According to Amnesty International, under Hamas rule, newspapers were closed down and journalists were harassed. Fatah demonstrations were forbidden or suppressed, as in the case of a large demonstration on the anniversary of Yasser Arafat's death, which resulted in the deaths of seven people, after protesters hurled stones at Hamas security forces.

Hamas and other militant groups continued to fire Qassam rockets across the border into Israel. According to Israel, between the Hamas takeover and the end of January 2008, 697 rockets and 822 mortar bombs were fired at Israeli towns. In response, Israel targeted Qassam launchers and military targets and declared the Gaza Strip a hostile entity. In January 2008, Israel curtailed travel from Gaza, the entry of goods, and cut fuel supplies, resulting in power shortages. This brought charges that Israel was inflicting collective punishment on the Gaza population, leading to international condemnation. Despite multiple reports from within the Strip that food and other essentials were in short supply, Israel said that Gaza had enough food and energy supplies for weeks.

The Israeli government uses economic means to pressure Hamas. Among other things, it caused Israeli commercial enterprises like banks and fuel companies to stop doing business with the Gaza Strip. The role of private corporations in the relationship between Israel and the Gaza Strip is an issue that has not been extensively studied.

=== List of governments ===
- Hamas government of June 2007 (14 June 2007 – September 2012)
- Hamas government of 2012 (September 2012 – 2 June 2014)
- Third Hamdallah Government (2 June 2014 – 17 October 2016)
- Hamas government of October 2016 (17 October 2016 – 6 July 2026)

== Leadership personnel ==
=== Hamas leader in the Gaza Strip ===
The Hamas leader in the Gaza Strip (Note: Also known as: Leader of Hamas in the Gaza Strip; Head of Hamas in Gaza; Military and Operational leader in Gaza; De facto leader as Head of the Gaza office; De facto executive authority in the Gaza Strip; De facto head of government; De facto leader as Head of Hamas's political wing in Gaza; De facto leader in the Gaza Strip; De-facto leader of Hamas forces in Gaza; Hamas's de facto leader in the Gaza Strip; Leader of Hamas in Gaza) is the de facto ruler of the Gaza Strip areas controlled by the Hamas from 2007 until 2024. The Hamas Leader in the Gaza Strip was also the Chairman of the Political Bureau in the Gaza Strip. Since 2025, the leader was also concurrently serving as the commander of the Izz al-Din al‑Qassam Brigades.

No.	Portrait	Name (Birth–Death)	Term of office			Ref.
No.	Portrait	Name (Birth–Death)	Took office	Left office	Time in office	Ref.
1		Ismail Haniyeh إسماعيل هنية (c. 1962–2024) (Note: As Chairman of the Political Bureau in the Gaza Strip.)	11 June 2007	13 February 2017	9 years, 247 days	
2		Yahya Sinwar يحيى السنوار (1962–2024) (Note: As Chairman of the Political Bureau in the Gaza Strip.)	13 February 2017	16 October 2024 †	7 years, 246 days	
Vacant (Note: A war council which already existed during the leadership of Yahya Sinwar was still active during the time of vacancy.) (16 October 2024 – 13 January 2025)
3		Mohammed Sinwar محمد السنوار (1975–2025)	13 January 2025	13 May 2025 X	120 days	
Vacant (13 May 2025 – 3 June 2025)
4		Izz al-Din al-Haddad عز الدين الحداد (1970–2026)	3 June 2025	15 May 2026 X	346 days	
Vacant (15 May 2026 – 18 May 2026)
5		Mohammed Odeh محمد عودة (1974–2026)	18 May 2026	26 May 2026 X	8 days	
Vacant (26 May 2026 – present)

=== Head of government (Prime Minister and Head of the Government Administrative Committee) ===
No.	Portrait	Name (Birth–Death)	Term of office			Deputy	Ref.
No.	Portrait	Name (Birth–Death)	Took office	Left office	Time in office	Deputy	Ref.
Recognized Head of government
Recognized by the Palestine Authority
1		Ismail Haniyeh إسماعيل هنية (c. 1962–2024)	11 June 2007	14 June 2007 (Note: The Palestinian Legislative Council recognized Haniyeh until 2 June 2014 as head of government.)	3 days	Azzam al-Ahmad	
Unrecognized Head of government
Unrecognized by the Palestine Authority
(1)		Ismail Haniyeh إسماعيل هنية (c. 1962–2024)	14 June 2007	13 February 2017	9 years, 244 days	Mohammed Awad (2007–2012); Ziad Al-Zaza (2012–2014)	
2		Yahya Sinwar يحيى السنوار (1962–2024)	13 February 2017	2019	1 year, 322 days	Ziad Al-Zaza	
3		Mohammed Awad محمد عوض (born ?)	2019	13 June 2021	2 years, 163 days	Ziad Al-Zaza (2019); Unknown (2019–2021)	
–		Rawhi Mushtaha روحي مشتهى (1959–2024); Acting (Note: Acting Head of Hamas Civil Governance in the Gaza Strip)	13 June 2021	July 2024	3 years, 18 days	Unknown	
4		Issam al-Da'alis عصام الدعاليس (1966–2025)	13 June 2021	18 March 2025	3 years, 278 days	Unknown	
Vacant (18 March 2025 – present) (Note: As of January 2026 the Government Administrative Committee still does the daily governance of Gaza. On 6 July 2026, the Hamas announced the disestablishment of the Emergency Committee.) (Note: Since March 2025 it was planned that the "Community Support Committee" will take the duties of head of government.)

=== Head of state (President) ===
No.	Portrait	Name (Birth–Death)	Term of office			Ref.
No.	Portrait	Name (Birth–Death)	Took office	Left office	Time in office	Ref.
1		Mahmoud Abbas مَحْمُود عَبَّاس (born 1935)	11 June 2007	14 June 2007	3 days	
None (14 June 2007 – 15 January 2009)
2		Aziz Dweik عزيز دويك (born 1948)	15 January 2009	2 June 2014	5 years, 138 days	
(1)		Mahmoud Abbas مَحْمُود عَبَّاس (born 1935)	2 June 2014 (Note: recognized by the Hamas government since then.)	Incumbent	12 years, 168 days	

=== Mayor of Gaza City ===
The mayor of Gaza City is the head of government of Gaza City. He will leads the Gaza City's council.

No.	Portrait	Name (Birth–Death)	Term of office			Ref.
No.	Portrait	Name (Birth–Death)	Took office	Left office	Time in office	Ref.
1		Maged Abu Ramadan ماجد عوني محمد أبو رمضان (born 1955)	14 June 2007	2008	201 days	
2		Rafiq al-Makki رفيق مكي (born 1959)	22 March 2008	2014	5 years, 285 days	
3		Nizar Hijazi نزار حجازي (born ?)	2014	2019	5 years	
4		Yahya Al-Sarraj يحيى السراج (born 1962)	27 July 2019	Incumbent	7 years, 113 days	

=== Chairman of the Political Bureau in the Gaza Strip ===
The Chairman of the Political Bureau in the Gaza Strip (Note: Also known as: Head of Hamas' political bureau in Gaza; Hamas Chief in the Gaza Strip; Head of the Gaza-based leadership; Head of the Gaza office; Head of Hamas's political wing in Gaza; Gaza Leader; Gaza Strip Chief; Hamas Leader in Gaza; Hamas' de facto leader in Gaza; Hamas Chief in Gaza) is the highest political office of the Hamas in the Gaza Strip. The chairman was also the Hamas leader of the Gaza Strip from 2007 until 2024, before the political power from chairman had been transferred from the political wing to the military one. (Note: After Muhammed Sinwar was appointed as the Hamas leader in the Gaza Strip on January 2025.)

No.	Portrait	Name (Birth–Death)	Term of office			Deputy	Election	Ref.
No.	Portrait	Name (Birth–Death)	Took office	Left office	Time in office	Deputy	Election	Ref.
1 (Note: Before the Gaza Strip became de facto independent: 1. Ahmed Yassin was chairman from October 1997 until March 2004; 2. Abdel Aziz al-Rantisi from March 2004 until April 2004; 3. Nizar Awadallah from April 2004 until early 2007; 4. Ismail Haniyeh from early 2007 on.)		Ismail Haniyeh إسماعيل هنية (c. 1962–2024)	11 June 2007	13 February 2017	9 years, 247 days	Unknown	None	
2		Yahya Sinwar يحيى السنوار (1962–2024)	13 February 2017	16 October 2024 †	7 years, 246 days	Khalil al-Hayya (2017 – 16 October 2024)	2017 2021	
3 (Note: In "exile" in Qatar.)		Khalil al-Hayya خليل الحية (born 1960); Acting	16 October 2024	11 January 2026	1 year, 87 days	Unknown	None	
–		Ali al-Amoudi علي العامودي (born 1975) (Note: On a Interim base for Khalil al-Hayya.); Interim	11 January 2026	23 February 2026	43 days	Unknown	None	
3 (Note: In "exile" in Qatar.)		Khalil al-Hayya خليل الحية (born 1960); Acting	23 February 2026	July 2026	147 days	Unknown	None	
4		Ali al-Amoudi علي العامودي (born 1975)	July 2026	Incumbent	120 days	Unknown	None	

== Security and domestic issues ==
After having confronted and disarmed significant Fatah-supporting hamullas, or clans, Hamas had a near monopoly on arms inside Gaza. In March 2010, however, Ahmed Jabari described the security situation in Gaza as deteriorating and said Hamas was starting to lose control. In June 2011, the Independent Commission for Human Rights published a report whose findings included that the Palestinians in the West Bank and the Gaza Strip were subjected in 2010 to an "almost systematic campaign" of human rights abuses by the Ramallah and Hamas administrations, as well as by Israeli authorities, with the security forces belonging to the Ramallah and Hamas government being responsible for torture, arrests and arbitrary detentions.

A 2012 report by Nathan J. Brown found increasing authoritarian actions in the administration of the Gaza Strip, with opposition parties restricted from performing public activities. Brown found that the Hamas government increasingly took on tendencies seen in past administrations by the rival Fatah party, which ruled over the West Bank. Parties affiliated with Fatah, as well as affiliated NGOs, have been subjected to stricter controls. One such NGO, the Sharek Youth Forum, was closed in 2010. The United Nations Resident and Humanitarian Coordinator in the occupied Palestinian Territory requested that Hamas reconsider dissolving that NGO.

In June 2013, as a result of pressure from Egypt, Hamas deployed a 600-strong force to prevent rocket fire into Israel from Gaza. The following months showed a dramatic decline in the number of rockets fired at Israel. in February 2014, however, Hamas removed most of the anti-rocket force it had deployed to prevent cross-border attacks on Israel. This move by Hamas is likely to have been interpreted as a green light to fire on Israel by the various other terror groups in Gaza, such as the Islamic Jihad Movement in Palestine, which carried out in excess of 60 rocket attacks on southern Israel, on 12 March 2014 alone. In the wake of this incident of rocket-fire into Israel, and the many other incidents that followed, Israel warned that it might invade Gaza if the attacks did not cease.

As further rocket attacks continued, Israel took action in the summer of 2014 by carrying out a temporary invasion of the Gaza Strip, during which more than 800 Hamas members were killed by the IDF (according to Israel's ITIC organization) – note that casualty statistics in Gaza-Israeli conflicts are commonly up for debate and controversy (the latter analyses the casualty figures from the 2008–09 Gaza conflict). This came as a major blow to Hamas, and to their support in the Gaza Strip. The emergence of a recent faction of the Islamic State of Iraq and the Levant (yet to be officially confirmed) within the Strip has also added security-concerns amongst Hamas officials, following the unsuccessful defence of the Strip against Israel's Operation Protective Edge. On 31 May 2015, the Islamic State Group offshoot, also calling itself the "Sheikh Omar Hadid Brigade", claimed responsibility for the assassination of a high ranking Hamas commander, whose vehicle was blown up when an on-board bomb was detonated.

The General Security Service, formally part of the Hamas political party, operates akin to a governmental body within Gaza. Under the direct oversight of Hamas leader Yahya Sinwar, it conducts extensive surveillance on Palestinians, compiling files on various individuals including journalists and government critics. This secret police force relies on a network of informants and employs tactics such as censorship and surveillance to maintain control. Before the 2023 conflict with Israel, the unit reportedly had a monthly budget of $120,000 and consisted of 856 personnel, including more than 160 individuals paid to spread Hamas propaganda and conduct online attacks against opponents.

Other powerful internal security bodies in Gaza include Military Intelligence, which focuses on Israel, and the Internal Security Service, an arm of the Interior Ministry.

== Finance and economics ==
Upon taking power, Hamas announced they would refuse to honour past international agreements between the Palestinian government and Israel. As a result, the United States and the EU cut off aid to the Gaza Strip, and Israel and the Middle East Quartet implemented punitive economic measures against the Gaza Strip. They view the group as a terrorist organization, and have pressured Hamas to recognize Israel, renounce violence, and make good on past agreements. Prior to disengagement, 120,000 Palestinians from Gaza were employed in Israel or in joint projects. After the Israeli withdrawal, the gross domestic product of the Gaza Strip declined. Israeli enterprises shut down, work relationships were severed and job opportunities in Israel dried up.

Following Hamas' takeover in 2007, key international powers, including the EU, US and Israel showed public support for the new Fatah administration without Hamas. The EU and US normalized the tie to the Palestinian National Authority and resumed direct aid. Israel announced it would return frozen tax revenue of about US$800m to the new Fatah administration. Israel also imposed a naval blockade of the Hamas-controlled Gaza Strip, which ensured Mediterranean imports of goods into the Strip did not include any sort of weaponry. The naval policy was stopped, and then was re-initiated in early 2014, when an arms shipment was seized by the IDF. The move disabled Hamas from making further investments in weapon-trade with Iran, and other Iranian backed groups such as Hezbollah in Lebanon.

Despite the active blockade (which many claimed also restricted non-weapon related trade, such as food supply), Hamas leader Mahmoud Zahar said, speaking in 2012, that Gaza's economic situation has improved and Gaza has become self-reliant "in several aspects except petroleum and electricity." Zahar said that Gaza's economic conditions are better than those in the West Bank. However, such statements have been considered political propaganda by many, and could have been aimed towards diminishing the economic successes of the rival Fatah political party in the West Bank, at a time when tensions between the two parties became particularly intense.

=== 2012 fuel crisis ===
Gaza generally obtained its diesel fuel from Israel but, in 2011, Hamas began buying cheaper fuel from Egypt, bringing it via a network of tunnels, and refused to buy it from Israel.

In early 2012, due to internal economic disagreement between the Palestinian Authority and the Hamas Government in Gaza, decreased supplies from Egypt through tunnel smuggling, and Hamas' refusal to ship fuel via Israel, the Gaza Strip plunged into a fuel crisis, bringing increasingly long electricity shut downs and disruption of transportation. Egypt attempted to stop the use of tunnels for delivery of Egyptian fuel purchased by Palestinian authorities, and severely reduced supply through the tunnel network. As the crisis deepened, Hamas sought to equip the Rafah terminal between Egypt and Gaza for fuel transfer, and refused to accept fuel delivered via the Kerem Shalom crossing between Israel and Gaza.

In mid-February, as the crisis escalated, Hamas rejected an Egyptian proposal to bring in fuel via the Kerem Shalom Crossing between Israel and Gaza to reactivate Gaza's only power plant. Ahmed Abu Al-Amreen of the Hamas-run Energy Authority refused it on the grounds that the crossing is operated by Israel and Hamas' fierce opposition to the existence of Israel. Egypt cannot ship diesel fuel to Gaza directly through the Rafah crossing point, because it is limited to the movement of individuals.

In early March, the head of Gaza's energy authority stated that Egypt wanted to transfer energy via the Kerem Shalom Crossing, but he personally refused it to go through the "Zionist entity" (Israel) and insisted that Egypt transfer the fuel through the Rafah Crossing, although this crossing is not equipped to handle the half-million liters needed each day.

In late March, Hamas began offering carpools of Hamas state vehicles for people to get to work. Many Gazans began to wonder how these vehicles have fuel themselves, as diesel was completely unavailable in Gaza, ambulances could no longer be used, but Hamas government officials still had fuel for their own cars. Many Gazans said that Hamas confiscated the fuel it needed from petrol stations and used it exclusively for their own purposes.

Egypt agreed to provide 600,000 liters of fuel to Gaza daily, but it had no way of delivering it that Hamas would agree to.

In addition, Israel introduced a number of goods and vehicles into the Gaza Strip via the Kerem Shalom Crossing, as well as the normal diesel for hospitals. Israel also shipped 150,000 liters of diesel through the crossing, which was paid for by the Red Cross.

In April 2012, the issue was resolved as certain amounts of fuel were supplied with the involvement of the Red Cross, after the Palestinian Authority and Hamas reached a deal. Fuel was finally transferred via the Israeli Kerem Shalom Crossing.

=== Economic protests ===
In March 2019, there were a series of economic protests against Hamas in response to tax hikes due to the Israeli-Egyptian blockade of the Gaza Strip and financial pressure from the Palestinian Authority. Protesters used the slogan "We want to live". Hamas responded by arresting and beating people (including journalists and human rights employees), as well as by raiding homes. In July and August 2023, thousands of Palestinians in the Gaza Strip took to the streets to protest chronic power outages, poor economic conditions in the territory, and Hamas's taxation of stipends to the poor paid by Qatar. The 2023 rallies, organized by a grassroots online movement called "Alvirus Alsakher" (The mocking virus), were a rare public display of discontent against the ruling Hamas government. Hamas bars most demonstrations and public displays of discontent. Hamas police attacked and detained journalists attempting to cover the protests, and at least one protestor was killed.

=== Budget ===
Most of the Gaza Strip administration funding comes from outside as aid, with a large portion delivered by UN organizations directly to education and food supply. Most of the Gaza GDP of $700 million comes as foreign humanitarian and direct economic support. Of those funds, the major part is supported by the U.S. and the European Union. Portions of the direct economic support have been provided by the Arab League, though it largely has not provided funds according to schedule. Among other alleged sources of Gaza administration budget is Iran.

A diplomatic source told Reuters that Iran had funded Hamas in the past with up to $300 million per year, but the flow of money had not been regular in 2011. "Payment has been in suspension since August", said the source. The government of President Bashar al-Assad in Syria had been a stalwart ally and a conduit for Iranian money. But due to sectarian considerations following the revolt in Syria, Hamas decided to shut its political bureau in Damascus. Hamas' break with Syria has meant a sharp cut in the financing it received from Iran. In response, Hamas has raised taxes and fees considerably. Setting up its own lavish civil administration in Gaza that issues papers, licenses, insurance and numerous other permissions — and always for a tax or a fee.

In January 2012, some diplomatic sources have said that Turkey promised to provide Haniyeh's Gaza Strip administration with $300 million to support its annual budget.

In April 2012, the Hamas government in Gaza approved its budget for 2012, which was up 25% year-on-year over 2011 budget, indicating that donors, including Iran, benefactors in the Islamic world and Palestinian expatriates, are still heavily funding the movement. Chief of Gaza's parliament's budget committee Jamal Nassar said the 2012 budget is $769 million, compared to $630 million in 2011.

According to OpEd columnist Thomas Friedman of The New York Times, Gaza has been woefully mismanaged by Hamas: Gaza is pumping all its drinking water from its coastal aquifer at triple its renewable rate of recharge and, as a result, saltwater is seeping in. In 2013, the United Nations said that there would be no potable water left in Gaza's main aquifer by 2016. Gaza has no big desalination plant and lacks the electricity to run it anyway.

== Foreign relations ==
=== International aid and Israeli cooperation ===
In January and February 2011, the United Nations Office for the Coordination of Humanitarian Affairs (UNOCHA) conducted an assessment of the effects of the measures to ease the access restrictions. They concluded that they did not result in a significant improvement in people's livelihoods. They found that the "pivotal nature of the remaining restrictions" and the effects of three years of strict blockade prevented a significant improvement in livelihoods and called on Israel to fully abolish the blockade including removing restrictions on the import of construction materials and the exports of goods, and to lift the general ban on the movement of people between Gaza and the West Bank via Israel in order to comply with what they described as international humanitarian and human rights law obligations.

=== International visits ===
Qatari Emir Hamad bin Khalifa Al Thani became the first foreign leader to visit the enclave since Hamas' takeover. On 16 November 2012, following the death of Ahmed Jabril, Egyptian prime minister Hisham Qandil visited the enclave, leading to a brief ceasefire offer by Israel. Tunisia's Foreign Minister Rafik Abdessalem and Turkey's Foreign Minister Ahmet Davutoglu visited Gaza in November 2012 as well.

== See also ==
- Hamastan
- Palestinian political violence
- Rival government
