= Samih Tabila =

Palestinian politician (1950–2026)

- سميح طبيلة

Mayor of Nablus
- In office August 2019 – August 2021
- Preceded by: Adly Yaish
- Succeeded by: Iyah Khalaf
- In office 11 August 2015 – May 2017
- Preceded by: Ghassan Shakaa
- Succeeded by: Adly Yaish

Minister of Transport and Communications
- In office 31 July 2015 – 13 April 2019
- Preceded by: Allam Mousa
- Succeeded by: Asem Salem

Personal details
- Born: 17 December 1950 Nablus, Jordanian-occupied West Bank
- Died: 15 March 2026 (aged 75) Nablus, West Bank
- Party: Fatah
- Education: Ain Shams University (BArch)
- Occupation: Architect

Samih Tabila (Arabic: سميح طبيلة; 17 December 1950 – 15 March 2026) was a Palestinian politician. A member of Fatah, he served as Minister of Transport and Communications from 2015 to 2019 and was two-time mayor of Nablus from 2015 to 2017 and 2019 to 2021.

Tabila died in Nablus on 15 March 2026, at the age of 75.
