= Hamas government of 2012 =

Second de facto Hamas government of the Gaza Strip

- Date formed: September 2012
- Date dissolved: 2 June 2014

People and organisations
- Head of state: Mahmoud Abbas (President of the Palestinian National Authority)
- Head of government: Ismail Haniyeh
- No. of ministers: 10
- Member party: Hamas
- Status in legislature: PLC (Gaza Strip)
- Opposition party: Fatah
- Opposition leader: Mahmoud Abbas

History
- Predecessor: Hamas Government of June 2007
- Successor: Palestinian unity government of 2014

The Hamas government of 2012 was the second de facto Hamas government in the Gaza Strip since the takeover of the Gaza Strip by Hamas in 2007. It was formed on 26 August 2012 and approved by the Gaza-based Hamas members of the Palestinian Legislative Council (PLC). As with the first Hamas government, this government was led by Ismail Haniyeh.

Seven of the ten ministers were newly appointed to the new government. The priorities of the new government has been said to be "ending the siege [of the Gaza Strip] and easing the problems of citizens, especially with regard to electricity and water." Neither the Palestinian Authority nor any foreign country recognised the Hamas governments as legitimate, and do not have any relations with Hamas; the United States, Canada, the European Union, Japan and Israel have designated Hamas a terrorist organization.

The Hamas governments in the Gaza Strip claim to be successors of the Palestinian unity government 2007, which had been dismissed by Palestinian President Mahmud Abbas in June 2007. Haniyeh had continued to claim the PA Fatah government of 2007 in West Bank and its successors were illegitimate.

The Hamas government of 2012 resigned in June 2014 after the formation of the Palestinian unity government of 2014.

== Members of the government ==
Name	Office	Party
Ismail Haniyeh	Prime Minister	Hamas
Ziad Al-Zaza *	Deputy Prime Minister	Hamas
Ziad Al-Zaza *	Finance	Hamas
Mufiz al-Makhalalati	Health	Hamas
Yusef Sobhi Aghreyz	Housing and Public Works	Hamas
Mazen Haniyeh	Justice	Hamas
Ismail Radwan	Religious Endowments (Waqf)	Hamas
Mohammed Jawad al-Farra	Local Government	Hamas
Ali Abdul Aziz al-Tirshawi	Agriculture	Hamas
Ghazi Hamad	Deputy Foreign Minister	Hamas
Fathi Hamad *	Interior	Hamas
Osama al-Muzayni *	Education	Hamas

- Kept their positions from previous Hamas government of June 2007.

== Diplomacy ==
In September 2012, following the announcement of the new government, the newspaper Asharq Al-Awsat reported that for the first time since the split with the Palestinian Authority in 2007, Hamas was seeking to appoint its own diplomats.

Deputy Foreign Minister Ghazi Hamad, however, strongly denied that these forthcoming diplomatic appointments was an indication that the Gaza government was seeking to entrench the division between West Bank and Gaza Strip.

== See also ==
- Palestinian government
