= Hamas government of June 2007 =

Government in the Gaza Strip, June-September 2007

Hamas Government of June 2007
- Date formed: 14 June 2007
- Date dissolved: September 2012

People and organisations
- Head of state: Mahmoud Abbas (not recognized by Hamas)
- Head of government: Ismail Haniyeh
- No. of ministers: 13
- Member party: Hamas
- Status in legislature: Palestinian Legislative Council (not recognized by Hamas)

History
- Predecessor: Palestinian Unity Government of March 2007
- Successor: Second Hamas Government of September 2012

The Hamas government of June 2007 led by Ismail Haniyeh of Hamas was the de facto government in the Gaza Strip after a fierce inter-factional Palestinian warfare in the Gaza Strip, in which Hamas ousted Fatah from the Gaza Strip. The Hamas government was not appointed by PA President Mahmoud Abbas nor approved by the Palestinian Legislative Council (PLC). It exercised de facto rule over the Gaza Strip, and was not recognised by any foreign government.

On 14 June 2007, President Abbas dismissed the Haniyeh-led Palestinian unity government of March 2007 and appointed a Fatah-led PA government. Abbas also suspended articles in the Basic Law to dispense with the need for the Fatah government to obtain PLC approval. The PA government was widely recognized as the representative government of the Palestinian National Authority, the de jure authority in the Palestinian territories, with de facto control only in the West Bank. However, Haniyeh and Hamas claimed the Fatah-led PA government was illegitimate and unconstitutional.

The Hamas government of June 2007, in parallel with the Fatah-led PA government of June 2007, succeeded the Palestinian unity government of March 2007. In the Hamas government, five Hamas ministers that served in the unity government kept their posts, while the remaining six West Bank-based Hamas ministers were replaced by Gaza-based Hamas members. The portfolios that had belonged to non-Hamas ministers in the unity government were distributed among Hamas ministers.

Haniyeh reshuffled the Hamas government in September 2012, which is regarded as the second Hamas government in the Gaza Strip.

== Members of the government ==
Name	Office
Ismail Haniyeh	Prime Minister
Mohammed Awad	Deputy Prime Minister
Mohammed Awad	Foreign Affairs
Samir Abu Eisheh	Planning Minister
Said Seyam (replaced by Fathi Hamad in 2009)	Interior Minister
Osama al-Muzayni	Education
Yousef al-Mansi	Telecommunications and Information Technology
Mohammed al-Agha	Agriculture
Mohammed al-Barghouthi	Local Government
Ziad al-Zaza	Economic Affairs
Basem Naim	Health
Ali al-Sartawi	Justice
Hussein Tartouri	Waqf and Religious Affairs
Amal Syam	Women Affairs
Ashraf al-Ajrami	State
Basem Naim	Youth and Sports

== See also ==
- Palestinian government
- Palestinian government of June 2007 - Fatah government in the West Bank (widely recognized as the government of the Palestinian National Authority
- Gaza War (2008–2009)
- Blockade of the Gaza Strip
