= Hamas government of October 2016 =

De facto Palestinian government in Gaza Strip

Hamas Government of October 2016
- Date formed: 17 October 2016
- Date dissolved: 6 July 2026

People and organisations
- Head of state: Mahmoud Abbas (recognized by the government in Gaza)
- Head of government: Ismail Haniyeh (2016–2017); Yahya Sinwar (2017–2019); Mohammed Awad (2019–2021); Issam al-Da'alis (2021–2025); Vacant (2025–) (Note: During the Gaza war, Palestinian factions held intra-Palestinian talks in October 2024 where they agreed on a plan for a "Community Support Committee" to govern Gaza. After Issam al-Da'alis was killed on 18 March 2025 during the Gaza war, his post was left vacant, with Hamas envisioning that the committee would assume government affairs. This proposal later materialized into the National Committee for the Administration of Gaza.)
- No. of ministers: 16
- Total no. of members: 16
- Member party: Hamas
- Status in legislature: Majority government

History
- Predecessor: Third Hamdallah Government
- Successor: National Committee for the Administration of Gaza

The Hamas government of October 2016 is a faction of the Palestinian government based in Gaza and is effectively the third Hamas-dominated government in the Gaza Strip since the takeover of Gaza by Hamas. On October 17, 2016, the Supreme Administrative Committee began the process of building progressive ministries in Gaza, reshuffled active ministries and repositioned 16 deputy ministers and director generals in government institutions. The government in Gaza is composed of deputy ministers, governors-general and other high-level officials linked directly to the Ramallah administration. Initially, it was speculated that the formation of the Hamas government in 2016 was an attempt by Ismail Haniyeh to return to full Hamas control of Gaza. As part of government reform, it was decided to expand the Ministry of Planning. The United States, Canada, the European Union, Japan and Israel classify Hamas as a state institution in Gaza associated with the PLO government and recognize the PLO government as the legitimate government of Gaza territory. The Hamas government is recognized by the Palestine State Administration in Ramallah.

According to some views, the third Hamas cabinet de facto succeeded the failed 2014 Unity Government, which was reshuffled by Palestinian President Mahmud Abbas in July 2015 without Hamas consent and was announced by Hamas as expired on 19 October 2016. "Coalition for Accountability and Integrity - Aman" said that the formation of this committee was a declaration of a new government in the Gaza Strip. Youssef Mahmoud, the spokesman for the consensus Palestinian government, said that every action made in Gaza without the consensus government's approval is illegitimate and not recognized by the Ramallah government. Ismail Haniyeh, the Prime Minister of the 2007 and 2012 Hamas-led governments, considers the 2015 Fatah-dominated government in Ramallah as illegitimate. The Hamas government of 2016 exercises de facto rule over the Gaza Strip, supported by the Palestinian Legislative Council, which is dominated by members of Hamas.

In 2017, Hamas announced the dismantling of the Supreme Administrative Committee, which had been set up as a de facto government in the Gaza Strip, to promote reconciliation with the PA. In February 2017, Yahya Sinwar took over from Ismail Haniyeh as leader of Hamas in the Gaza Strip.

On 14 June 2021, Hamas announced that Issam al-Da'alis was the new prime minister of the Hamas government in Gaza, succeeding Mohammed Awad who resigned after two years in the position. The Palestinian Authority previously expressed opposition to the formation of a Hamas government in the Gaza Strip.

During intra-Palestinian talks in October 2024, Palestinian factions agreed on a plan for a "Community Support Committee" to govern Gaza. After the killing of Issam al-Da'alis on 18 March 2025 during the Gaza war, his post was left vacant as Hamas envisioned that this committee would assume government affairs of the Gaza Strip; this proposal later materialized into the National Committee for the Administration of Gaza, which has yet to assume de facto governance in the territory.

== Formation ==
A Unity Government was formed on 2 June 2014, following the Fatah-Hamas Reconciliation Agreement of 23 April 2014. However, the Unity Government shortly came to deadlock over implementing policies. In July 2015, President Abbas reshuffled the Ramallah-based Unity Government, giving raise to what is described as the Palestinian government of 2015, because Hamas was not consulted on the changes.

On 13 October 2016, Hamas called for a return of full-fledged Hamas governance of the Gaza Strip under Islamil Haniyeh. On 17 October, the Hamas-dominated Palestinian Legislative Council supported a reshuffle of Palestinian government representatives in the Gaza Strip, without the consent of President Abbas, thereby in effect creating a new government comprising Deputy Ministers and Directors-General.

== Members of the government ==
Office	Name	Party	Took office	Left office
Prime Minister	Ismail Haniyeh	Hamas	October 2016	February 2017
Prime Minister	Yahya Sinwar	Hamas	February 2017	2019
Prime Minister	Mohammed Awad	Hamas	2019	13 June 2021
Prime Minister	Issam al-Da'alis	Hamas	13 June 2021	18 March 2025
Prime Minister	Community Support Committee	Hamas	18 March 2025	Present
Head of the Government Administrative Committee	Issam al-Da'alis	Hamas	13 June 2021	18 March 2025 (Note: Killed in an Israeli airstrike during the Gaza war.)
Foreign Ministry	Khaled Meshaal	Hamas	2017	Present
Deputy Foreign Minister	Ghazi Hamad	Hamas	2021	Present
Deputy Prime Minister	Ziad Al-Zaza	Hamas	March 2017	Present
Economy Minister	Ziad Al-Zaza	Hamas	October 2016	Present
Interior Minister	Mohammed Awad		2019	Present
Justice	Issam al-Da'alis	Hamas		18 March 2025
Deputy minister for public works	Ibrahim Radwan	Hamas	17 October 2016	Present
Land Authority	Kamel Madi	Hamas	17 October 2016	Present
Local Government	Yahya al-Sarraj	Hamas	2019	Present
Agriculture	Ihab al-Ghusain	Hamas		
Finance	Jawad Abu Shamala	Hamas		9 October 2023
Transport	Ihab al-Ghusain	Hamas	17 October 2016	Present
Energy authority	Samir Mtayyar	Hamas	17 October 2016	Present
Culture	Anwar al-Buraawi	Hamas		
Interior ministry spokesperson	Ihab al-Ghussein	Hamas		17 October 2016 (Note: After leaving the office, he was killed in an Israeli airstrike during the Gaza war.)
Youth	Bashir Abu al-Naja	Hamas	17 October 2016	Present
Information & Culture	Fathi Ahmad Hammad	Hamas	17 October 2016	Present
Tourism	Ibrahim Jaber	Hamas	17 October 2016	Present
Health	Basem Naim	Hamas	2021	Present
Government Spokesperson	Taher al-Nunu	Hamas	2019	Present

== Responses to formation ==
Mahmud Abbas met with the political leader of Hamas Khaled Mashal in Qatar in late October and on 30 November 2016, it was reported that Abbas proposed to Hamas the formation of a temporary unity government to bridge the issues between Hamas and Fatah.

== Dissolution of the Hamas government ==
Following the Israeli invasion of the Gaza Strip in October 2023 and the war that followed, various international initiatives were raised for the establishing of a new government for the Gaza Strip that would replace Hamas. In Joly 2026, Hamas leadership in the Gaza Strip announced the dissolution of the Hamas government established in 2016 in order to allow for a transition for a new government under international supervision.

== See also ==
- Palestinian government
