= Ministry of Telecommunications and Digital Economy (Palestine) =

Government ministry of Palestine

Agency overview
- Formed: 1994
- Jurisdiction: Government of Palestine
- Headquarters: Ramallah, Palestine
- Agency executive: Abdel Razek Natsheh, Minister of Telecommunications and Digital Economy
- Website: www.mtit.pna.ps

The Ministry of Telecommunications and Digital Economy is one of the government offices of the Palestinian administration. The Ministry, previously known as the Ministry of Telecommunications and Information Technology, was rebranded by the Palestinian Authority following the November 29, 2012 vote in UN over upgrade of Palestine to non-member state status. The Ministry is headed by Abdel Razek Natsheh.

== List of ministers ==
#	Name	Party	Government	Term start	Term end	Notes
Minister of Telecommunications
1	Abdul Hafeez al-Ashhab	Independent	1	5 July 1994	17 May 1996	
2	Imad al-Faluji	Independent	2, 3, 4	17 May 1996	29 October 2002	
	Vacant		5	29 October 2002	30 April 2003	
Minister of Telecommunications and Information Technology
3	Azzam al-Ahmad	Fatah	6	30 April 2003	7 October 2003	
4	Abdul Rahman Hamad	Fatah	7	7 October 2003	12 November 2003	
(3)	Azzam al-Ahmad	Fatah	8	12 November 2003	24 February 2005	
5	Sabri Saidam	Fatah	9	24 February 2005	29 March 2006	
6	Jamal al-Khudari	Independent	10	29 March 2006	17 March 2007	
7	Yousef al-Mansi	Hamas	11	17 March 2007	14 June 2007	
8	Muhammad Kamal Hassouna	Independent	12	14 June 2007	19 May 2009	
9	Mashhour Abu Daqqa	Independent	13	19 May 2009	16 May 2012	
10	Safa Nassereldin	Independent	14, 15, 16	16 May 2012	2 June 2014	
11	Allam Mousa	Independent	17	2 June 2014	13 April 2019	
12	Ishaq Sidr	Fatah	18	13 April 2019	31 March 2024	
Minister of Telecommunications and Digital Economy
13	Abdel Razek Natsheh	Independent	19	31 March 2024	Incumbent	

== See also ==
- Telecommunications in Palestine
