= Ar-Risala =

Ar-Risala may refer to:

- Arrissalah, an Egyptian magazine published from 1933 to 1953
- Ar Risala, a newspaper published by Hamas
- Al-Risala, book of Islamic jurisprudence
