= Ministry of Transport and Communications (Palestine) =

Government ministry of Palestine

Agency overview
- Formed: 1948 (first form); 1994 (second form)
- Jurisdiction: Government of Palestine
- Headquarters: Ramallah, Palestine
- Minister responsible: Mohammed al-Ahmad, Minister of Transport and Communications
- Website: www.mot.gov.ps

The Ministry of Transport and Communications is a government ministry in Palestine. It was established in 1994 following the establishment of the Palestinian National Authority (PNA) to develop and regulate the Palestinian transport sector.

== Establishment ==
The Palestinian Ministry of Transport and Communications was established in 1994, following the issuance of a presidential decree by President Yasser Arafat to establish it during the beginning of the Palestinian National Authority.

== Functions ==
The main functions of the Palestinian Ministry of Transport and Communications are to develop and regulate the Palestinian transport sector, prepare and implement the necessary laws and studies, develop road networks, and construct railways, ports and airports.

== List of ministers ==
All-Palestine Government

#	Name	Party	Government	Term start	Term end	Notes
Minister of Transportation
1	Suleiman Toukan	Independent	All-Palestine	22 September 1948	1949	

Government of Palestine

#	Name	Party	Government	Term start	Term end	Notes
Minister of Transport
1	Abdul Aziz al-Hajj	Independent	1	5 July 1994	17 May 1996	
2	Ali al-Qawasmi	Fatah	2, 3	17 May 1996	13 June 2002	
3	Mitri Abu Aita	Fatah	4, 5	13 June 2002	30 April 2003	
4	Saadi al-Karnaz	Fatah	6	30 April 2003	7 October 2003	
Minister of Transport and Communications
—	Abdul Rahman Hamad (Interim)	Fatah	7	7 October 2003	12 November 2003	
5	Hikmat Zaid	Fatah	8	12 November 2003	24 February 2005	
6	Saad al-Din Khurma	Independent	9	24 February 2005	29 March 2006	
7	Ziad Al-Zaza	Hamas	10	29 March 2006	17 March 2007	
(4)	Saadi al-Karnaz	Fatah	11	17 March 2007	14 June 2007	
8	Mashhour Abu Daqqa	Independent	12	14 June 2007	19 May 2009	
(4)	Saadi al-Karnaz	Fatah	13	19 May 2009	16 May 2012	
9	Ali Abu Zuhri	Independent	14	16 May 2012	6 June 2013	
10	Nabil Demaidi	Independent	15, 16	6 June 2013	2 June 2014	
11	Allam Mousa	Independent	17	2 June 2014	31 July 2015	
12	Samih Tabila	Fatah	17	31 July 2015	13 April 2019	
13	Asem Salem	Independent	18	13 April 2019	31 March 2024	
14	Tariq Zoroub	Fatah	19	31 March 2024	4 October 2025	
—	Ahed Bseiso (Interim)	Independent	19	4 October 2025	15 November 2025	Serving Minister of Public Works and Housing
15	Mohammed al-Ahmad	Independent	19	15 November 2025	Incumbent	

== See also ==
- Transport in Palestine
