= Ishaq Sidr =

Palestinian politician, academic and engineer

Ishaq “Muhammad Sharif” Abdel-Hay Sidr
- إسحق سدر

Minister of Telecommunications and Information Technology
- In office 14 April 2019 – 31 March 2024
- President: Mahmoud Abbas

Personal details
- Born: 5 November 1953 (age 72) Hebron, Jordanian-administered West Bank, Palestine
- Party: Fatah
- Education: Palestine Polytechnic University

Ishaq “Muhammad Sharif” Abdel-Hay Sidr (born 5 November 1963) is a Palestinian engineer and academic who has been serving since April 2019 as Minister of Telecommunications and Information Technology within the government of Mohammad Shtayyeh. He previously served as chairman of the Palestinian Engineers Association sub-committee in Hebron Governorate in 2011. He also served as Dean of the College of Applied Professions at Palestine Polytechnic University and worked as a lecturer in its Colleges of Engineering and Graduate Studies.
