= Issam al-Da'alis =

Palestinian politician (1966–2025)

- عصام الدعاليس

Head of the Government Administrative Committee
- In office 14 June 2021 – 18 March 2025
- Leader: Yahya Sinwar; Mohammed Sinwar
- Preceded by: Mohammed Awad
- Succeeded by: Vacant (Note: During the Gaza war, Palestinian factions held intra-Palestinian talks in October 2024 where they agreed on a plan for a "Community Support Committee" to govern Gaza. After Issam al-Da'alis was killed on 18 March 2025 during the Gaza war, his post was left vacant, with Hamas envisioning that the committee would assume government affairs. This proposal later materialized into the National Committee for the Administration of Gaza.)

Personal details
- Born: 30 October 1966 Jabalia refugee camp, Gaza Strip, Egypt (present-day Jabalia refugee camp, Palestine)
- Died: 18 March 2025 (aged 58) Gaza Strip, Palestine
- Cause of death: Israeli Airstrike
- Party: Hamas

Issam Dib Abdullah al-Da'alis (Arabic: عصام ديب عبد الله الدعاليس, romanized: Issam Dib Abdullah Al-Da'alis, 30 October 1966 – 18 March 2025), also spelled Daalis or Dalis, was a Palestinian politician and senior Hamas official. He was head of the Hamas-run Government Administrative Committee of the Gaza Strip, a position comparable to a prime minister or head of government, from 2021 to 2025. He was killed by Israel during the 18 March 2025 attacks.

Al-Da'alis was a senior advisor to Hamas leader Ismail Haniyeh from 2012 to 2014, concurrently serving as a member of the Hamas Shura Council from 2009 to 2013.

== Biography ==
Al-Daalis was born in the Jabalia refugee camp in the Gaza Strip in 1966. He worked in various roles for UNRWA, including assistant director, member of its employee union, and head of its teachers' department. Between 2012 and 2014, al-Daalis was an advisor to Hamas leader Ismail Haniyeh. He was a member of the Hamas Shura Council from 2009 to 2013, leading the group's financial and economic department. He was deputy head of Hamas's political movement from 2012 to 2020. In March 2020, al-Daalis was elected to Hamas' Political Bureau in the Gaza Strip and became head of its media department.

In June 2021, al-Daalis left his position in the Hamas Political Bureau after the Palestinian Legislative Council (PLC) elected al-Da'alis as the head of the Government Administrative Committee of the Gaza Strip. Despite performing, from 2021 up until the beginning of the Gaza war, day-to-day work in the Gaza Strip akin to that of a head of government, al-Da'alis, in contrast to most other Hamas's leaders, had not been the target of Western sanctions.

Al-Da'alis was reported to have been killed in an Israeli airstrike on 23 July 2024, but his death was not confirmed by Hamas. He was killed during the 18 March 2025 attacks, at the age of 58. Hamas confirmed his death.

== See also ==
- List of leaders of Hamas
- Hamas government in the Gaza Strip
- Fatah–Hamas conflict
- List of heads of state and government who were assassinated or executed

=== Notes ===
Political offices
Preceded by Mohammed Awad	Head of the Government Administrative Committee; 2021–2025	Succeeded by Vacant
