= Yousef al-Mansi =

Palestinian politician (born 1953)

- يوسف المنسي

Minister of Telecommunications and Information Technology
- In office 17 March 2007 – 14 June 2007
- President: Mahmoud Abbas
- Prime Minister: Ismail Haniyeh
- Preceded by: Jamal al-Khudari
- Succeeded by: Muhammad Kamal Hassouna

Personal details
- Born: 25 June 1953 (age 73) Gaza City, All-Palestine Protectorate
- Party: Hamas
- Education: Al-Azhar University (bachelor's, master's, PhD)
- Occupation: Politician, architect

Yousef Mahmoud Hamid al-Mansi (Arabic: يوسف المنسي; born 25 June 1953) is a Palestinian architect and politician. He served as the Minister of Telecommunications and Information Technology in the second Haniyeh government and served as the Minister of Public Works in the Hamas government of the Gaza Strip.

== Early life ==
Al-Mansi was born on 25 June 1953 in Gaza City. He completed a bachelor's degree in 1981, a master's degree in 1999, and a doctorate in 2002, all in architecture from Al-Azhar University in Cairo, Egypt. He worked as an architect in the Ministry of Hajj and Endowments in Riyadh for 13 years before joining the faculty of the Islamic University of Gaza as its first head of the department of architecture in 1993.

== Political career ==
He served as the Minister of Telecommunications and Information Technology in the second Haniyeh government under Ismail Haniyeh from 17 March to 14 June 2007. Al-Mansi was appointed by Hamas as the Minister of Public Works of the Gaza Strip by January 2011.

Al-Mansi was arrested during the Israeli invasion of the Gaza Strip on 5 December 2023 and was questioned by Israeli authorities beginning on 7 December. He is considered the highest-ranking Hamas government figure whose capture has been announced.

Political offices
Preceded by Jamal al-Khudari	Minister of Telecommunications and Information Technology; 2007	Succeeded by Muhammad Kamal Hassouna
