= Islamic Salvation Party =

Palestinian political party

The National Islamic Salvation Party (Arabic: حزب الخلاص الوطني الإسلامي) is an offshoot political party formed by members of Hamas in 1996 in response to the signing of the Oslo Peace Accords.

== History ==
After the signing of the Oslo Peace Accords in 1993 and the creation of the Palestinian Authority (PA) in 1994, Hamas leadership was growing confident in its grassroots support and electoral clout, and Hamas leader Ahmed Yassin did not rule out that Hamas would contest national elections as a political party. The National Islamic Salvation Party was formed in Gaza in March 1996. Despite denying any connection with Hamas, its leadership and members belong to Hamas. The establishment of the party by an element of Hamas chose not to confront Fatah militarily in opposition to the Oslo Accords, but politically instead. Ismail Haniyeh was one of its leaders. Therefore, Haniyeh was not detained or tortured by the PA like other Hamas members during this time.

The successful cooptation of some parts of Palestinian Islamism, including the Islamic Salvation Party, was part of an effort by Arafat to divide and weaken Hamas in the post-Oslo era.

As of 2004, journalist Ghazi Hamad, editor-in-chief of Ar-Risala was its head. In 2007, the party was led by senior Hamas official Yahya Musa.

== Positions ==
The party, an unofficial political wing of Hamas, is considered more pragmatic than Hamas rank and file.

== Funding ==
In 2017, the party received $50,000 a month from Arafat.
