= Said Fanuna =

Palestinian political/military leader

- Occupation: Political/military leader
- Organization: Fatah

Said Fanuna is a Palestinian political/military leader. He was arrested in 1980 by Israel and deported to Lebanon, where he became an officer in the Fatah movement of Yasser Arafat. Upon the signing of the Oslo Accords, he was permitted to return to the Palestinian Territories in 1994 and served in the Palestinian National Authority.

Although still a member of Fatah, Fanuna has distanced himself from Mahmoud Abbas since he became PNA Chairman. After the Battle of Gaza Fanuna was appointed chief of security of the Gaza Strip by the Hamas government of Ismail Haniyeh.
