= Adly Yaish =

Palestinian politician (born 1952)

- Arabic: عدلي يعيش

Mayor of Nablus
- In office May 2017 – 2019
- Preceded by: Sameeh Tubeila
- Succeeded by: Sameeh Tubeila
- In office December 2005 – 2012
- Preceded by: Ghassan Hammouz
- Succeeded by: Ghassan Shakaa

Personal details
- Born: 30 June 1952 (age 73)
- Party: Hamas

Adly Yaish (Arabic: عدلي يعيش, ʿAdlī Yaʿīš), born 30 June 1952, is the former mayor of the Nablus Municipality in the central highlands of the West Bank under the Palestinian National Authority. He is a businessman working in automobiles trade. He is believed to come from a Samaritan family that converted to Islam.

On 24 May 2007 he was arrested by Israeli forces. He spent 15 months in prison without being charged.
