= Education Minister of the Gaza Strip =

Palestinian Ministry of Education (Gaza Strip)
Agency overview
- Jurisdiction: Gaza Strip
- Headquarters: Gaza city
- Agency executive: Osama al-Muzayni, Minister
- Parent agency: Hamas Authority

The Education Minister of the Gaza Strip is an office, created in June 2007, following the Fatah-Hamas conflict in Gaza and split between Palestinian cabinets in Gaza Strip and West Bank. The first Education Minister of the Hamas Authority in the Gaza Strip was named Osama al-Muzayni, part of the Hamas government of June 2007.

The office of the education ministry in Gaza was destroyed in an Israeli air strike, part of offensive Operation Cast Lead.

In 2012, during Hamas government reshuffle, Osama al-Muzayni kept his position. Al-Muzayni was reported killed during Gaza war.

== Education Ministers (Gaza Strip) ==
| # | Name | Party | Time in office |
|---|---|---|---|
| 1 | Osama al-Muzayni (Part of Ismail Haniyeh's cabinet, which began de facto control over the Gaza Strip in June 2007) | Hamas | June 2007–2014 |

== See also ==
- Education Minister of the Palestinian National Authority
