= Ghassan Shakaa =

Palestinian mayor

- غسان الشكعة

Mayor of Nablus
- In office 1994–2004
- Succeeded by: Adly Yaish
- In office 2012–2015
- Preceded by: Adly Yaish
- Succeeded by: Akram Rajoub

Personal details
- Born: 1943 Nablus, Mandatory Palestine
- Died: January 25, 2018 (aged 74–75) Nablus, West Bank
- Relations: Bassam Shaka (uncle)

Ghassan Shakaa (Arabic: غسان الشكعة, romanized: Ghassān Shak’ā) (1943 – 25 Jan 2018) was a Palestinian politician who was the mayor of Nablus in 1994–2004 and in 2012–2015, one of the largest cities in the West Bank. His uncle, Bassam Shaka was another former Nablus mayor. Shakaa was appointed to his position by Yasser Arafat. His brother was assassinated in 2003. Shakaa published an open letter in which he called for the Palestinian National Authority to restore order to his politically divided city. Shakaa died on January 25, 2018 at the age of 74.
