= List of mayors of Nablus =

This is the list of mayors of Nablus in chronological order.

== Mayors of Nablus ==
- Sheikh Mohammad Tuffaha 1869-1872
- Hasan Abdul Hadi 1873-1874
- Dr. Ahmad Hilmi 1874-1876
- Hasan Abdul Hadi 1879-1885
- Sahrif Touqan 1886-1887
- Abdellatif Abdul Hadi 1887-1894
- Bashir Touqan 1894-1896
- Badawi Ashour 1896-1897
- Abdellatif Abdul Hadi 1897-1900
- Bashir Touqan 1901-1902
- Tawfiq Hamad 1902-1906
- Mohammad Abdo 1907-1908
- Abdellatif Abdul Hadi 1908-1910
- Haidar Touqan 1911-1912
- Kamal Eddin Arafat 1912-1913
- Yousef Tamimi 1913-1913
- Hasan Hammad 1913-1915
- Bashir Sharabi (Acting) 1915-1915
- Kamal Eddin Arafat (Acting) 1915-1916
- Ahmad Mukhtar 1916-1917
- Yousef Tamimi 1917-1917
- Haidar Touqak 1917-1917
- Omar Zu'aiter 1917-1918
- Nimer Hammad 1918-1918
- Suleiman Smadi (Acting) 1918-1918
- Haidar Touqak 1918-1918
- Omar Zu'aiter 1918-1924
- Omar Jouhari 1924-1925
- Suleiman Touqan 1925-1951
- Ahmad Shakaa (Acting) 1951-1951
- Na'im Abdul Hadi 1951-1955
- The city Governor 1955-1957
- Ahmad Srouri 1957-1959
- Hamdi Kan'an 1959-1963
- Ma'zoz Masri 1963-1976
- Bassam Shakaa 1976-1982
- Appointed Authority 1982-1985
- Zafer al-Masri 1985-1986
- Hafez Touqan 1986-1988
- Ghassan Shakaa 1994-2004
- Local Government Committee led by Dr. Hussein Al-Araj 2004-2005
- Local Government Committee led by Ghassan Hammouz 2005-Dec. 2005
- Adly Yaish Dec. 2005 - Oct. 2012
- Ghassan Shakaa Oct 2012 - Aug. 2015
- Local Government Committee chaired by Sameeh Tubeila Aug. 2015 - May 2017
- Adly Yaish May 2017 - August 2021
- Local Government Committee August 2021 - April 2022
- Sami Hijjawi April 2022 - March 2024
- Husam Shakhshir March 2024 - Present
