= List of Palestinian rocket attacks on Israel in 2014 =

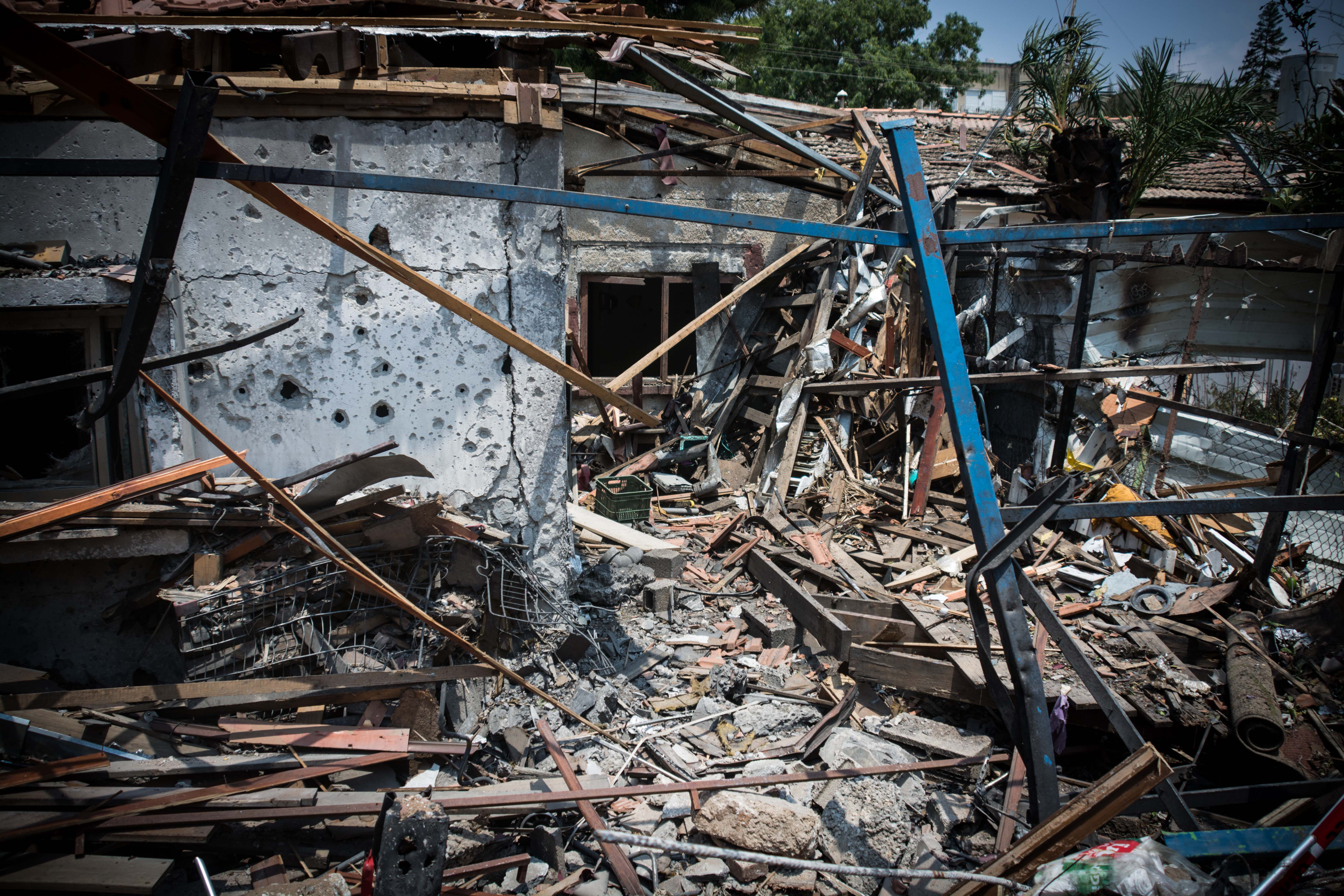
House destroyed by a rocket in Yehud, Israel in 2014.

The following is a detailed list of Palestinian rocket and mortar attacks on Israel in 2014. All of the attacks originated in the Gaza Strip, unless stated otherwise. For information pertaining to the wider conflict, see Arab–Israeli conflict and Israeli–Palestinian conflict. This list does not include reports of deaths and injuries caused by Hamas rocket and mortar attacks that fell within Gaza.

In total, all the rockets launched on Israel in 2014 resulted in 8 deaths and 60 injuries. All the fatalities occurred during Operation Protective Edge.

On 5 March, the Israeli Navy intercepted a ship containing dozens of long-range rockets being smuggled from Iran to the Gaza Strip.

On 10 March, Hamas, the Palestinian Islamist group that controls the Gaza Strip, unveiled a monument to its rocket attacks on Israeli cities and towns, a life-sized model of an M-75 rocket in Gaza City. The group declared that the attacks "managed to take the battle to the heart of the Zionist entity (Israel)".

On 23 April, Fatah and Hamas signed a reconciliation deal.

In July, the number of rocket attacks launched toward Israel from Gaza increased dramatically. Eighty rockets were fired on 7 July. On the following day, Israel launched Operation Protective Edge.

== Summary ==
This is a partial table that summarises the content of the article below.

Month	Missiles launched		Effect of missiles		Retaliation by Israel	
	Rockets	Mortars	Killed	Injured	Killed	Injured
January	22	4				
February	9					
March	65	1		1	1	
April	19	5				
May	4	3				
June	62	3		6		
July	2,874	15	6	34	1,122	7,800
August	950		2	19	540	1,913
Total	4,005	31	8	60	1,663	9,713

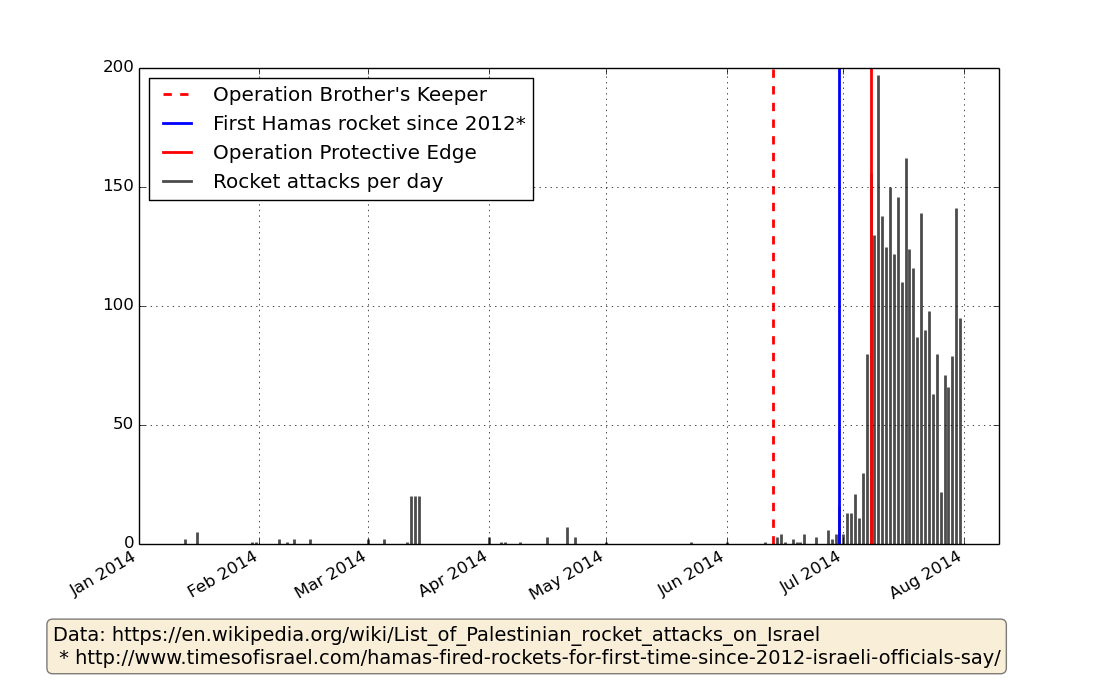
Histogram of Palestinian rocket attacks on Israel per day, 2014

== January ==
In January, Palestinians launched 22 rockets and four mortar shell at Israel in 19 separate attacks. Two of the rockets were launched from Sinai.

Press reports however mentioned only these attacks;

Date 2014	Rockets Fired	Rockets Impacts in Israel	Note
13 January	2	2	
16 January	5	0	
30 January	1	1	
31 January	1	0	

January 13

Two rockets were launched to the Northern Negev desert, near Sderot. There were no injuries or damage reported.

January 16

At 2am, five rockets were fired into Israel. The Iron Dome eliminated all rockets, as they would have hit Ashkelon. No injuries or damage were reported.

January 30

A rocket exploded in a non-inhabited area of Sdot Negev Regional Council. No injuries or damage were reported.

January 31

From the Sinai Peninsula a rocket was launched towards Eilat. The Iron Dome intercepted the rocket. The radical Salafi organization Ansar Bait al-Maqdis took responsibility for the launch.

== February ==
In February, Palestinian launched nine rockets at Israel in seven separate attacks.

Press reports however mentioned only these attacks;

Date	Rockets Fired	Rockets Impacts in Israel	Note
6 February	2	Unknown	
8 February	1	Unknown	
10 February	2	Unknown	
14 February	2	Unknown	

February 6

A Color Red siren alerting residents of a rocket launch from Gaza has been sounded in Ashkelon, followed by an explosion.

A further rocket launched from the Gaza Strip exploded in the Eshkol Regional Council. No injuries or damage were reported.

February 8

A red alert siren sounded in Sha'ar Hanegev and Sdot Negev Regional Councils. A rocket hit an open area in Sha'ar HaNegev. No injuries or damages were reported.

February 10

Palestinians fired a rocket into the Ashkelon Coast Regional Council, triggering sirens. After nightfall, a second rocket was launched into the same area. No injuries or damage were reported. Israel responded with an air strike on an underground rocket launcher in the central Gaza Strip.

February 14

In the evening, Palestinian Militants launched two rockets into Israel. One landed in the Ashkelon Coast Regional Council, the other in the Eshkol Regional Council. No injuries or damage were reported.

== March ==
In March, Palestinians launched 65 rockets and mortar shell, in 23 attacks.

March 1

In the night on Mount Hermon were heard loud blasts. The IDF checked the area and found the remains of two rockets near an IDF outpost. No injuries or damage were reported.

March 3

Mosaab Zaaneen, a 25-year-old militant from Palestinian Islamic Jihad, was killed in an Israeli air strike as he was attempting to launch rockets from Beit Hanoun in the northern Gaza Strip. The Israel Defense Forces stated that the strike "was carried out in order to eliminate an imminent attack targeting civilian communities of southern Israel".

March 5

Palestinians fired a rocket towards the Sha'ar Hanegev Regional Council, triggering sirens in local communities. The projectile landed within the Gaza Strip. Later, after nightfall, a second rocket was fired at Sderot. No injuries or damage were reported in either attack.

March 11

After nightfall, Palestinians fired a rocket into the Sha'ar Hanegev Regional Council. The projectile landed in an open area, causing no injuries or damage.

March 12–14

Palestinian Islamic Jihad Militants fired at least 60 rockets at Israeli cities and towns, in the heaviest barrage since 2012. No direct injuries were reported, but a 57-year-old woman was lightly injured while taking cover in Sderot. At least eight rockets fell within communities, with one exploding near a gas station and another near a public library. Explosions rocked the cities of Sderot and Netivot, and sirens sounded as far away as Beersheba.

== April ==
In April, There were 19 rockets and 5 mortar shell in 14 attacks towards Israel. These attacks caused property damage, but no deaths or injuries.

April 1

Residents heard massive detonations. Three rockets were fired at Eilat, which were intercepted by the Iron Dome.

April 3

The "Code Red" siren was heard 3 times in a row in the evening. No rocket landing were identified, therefore the rockets came down within Gaza.

April 4

In the Hof Ashkelon Regional Council a rocket exploded in the open area, close to the border fence. No injuries or damage were reported.

April 5

Militants in Gaza fired a rocket into Israel. No injuries or damage were reported.

April 6

In the Sha'ar HaNegev Regional Council, near a kibbutz, was heard an explosion of a mortar shell. No red alert siren sounded before. No one was hurt, no damage reported.

April 9

In the early afternoon a Color Red siren alerting residents of a rocket launch from Gaza has been sounded in Hof Ashkelon Regional Council. The rocket came down within the Gaza strip. Later in the evening a mortar rocket hit a kibbutz in the Sha'ar Hanegev Regional Council. It caused material damage, but no one was injured. No Red Siren sounded prior to the rockets landing.

April 13

Very early in the morning a mortar shell exploded close to the security fence in the open field, prior to a "red alert". In the late night two more mortars were launched targeting Israeli soldiers, operating at the security fence in the Southern Gaza area. No one got injured.

April 16

In the night, Militants launched several rockets at Southern Israel. No injuries or damage were reported.

April 21

Militants in Gaza fired seven rockets into Israel during the last day of the Passover holiday. The first three projectiles struck uninhabited areas in the Sha'ar Hanegev Regional Council, activating "Code Red" sirens. No damage was reported in the attack. Another two rockets caused light damage in Sderot. Israel responded by striking three terrorist targets in the Gaza Strip.

April 23

3 rockets were fired from Gaza at the Hof Ashkelon and Sha'ar HaNegev Regional Councils, after rocket alert sirens sounded. No injuries were reported.

April 24

A mortar shell exploded near the fence in Southern Gaza. Later in the day explosive device exploded near IDF force at the Northern Gaza border. No injuries or damage were reported

== May ==
Throughout May 4 rockets and 3 mortar shells were launched from Gaza in 5 attacks towards Israel.

May 1

A rocket hit an open area in Eshkol. No one were hurt and no damage was reported.

May 21

Several mortar rounds were fired at IDF forces on the Gaza border. No injuries, damages in attack.

May 23

A rocket exploded in open field in Sha'ar HaNegev Regional Council. No reports of damages or injuries.

== June ==
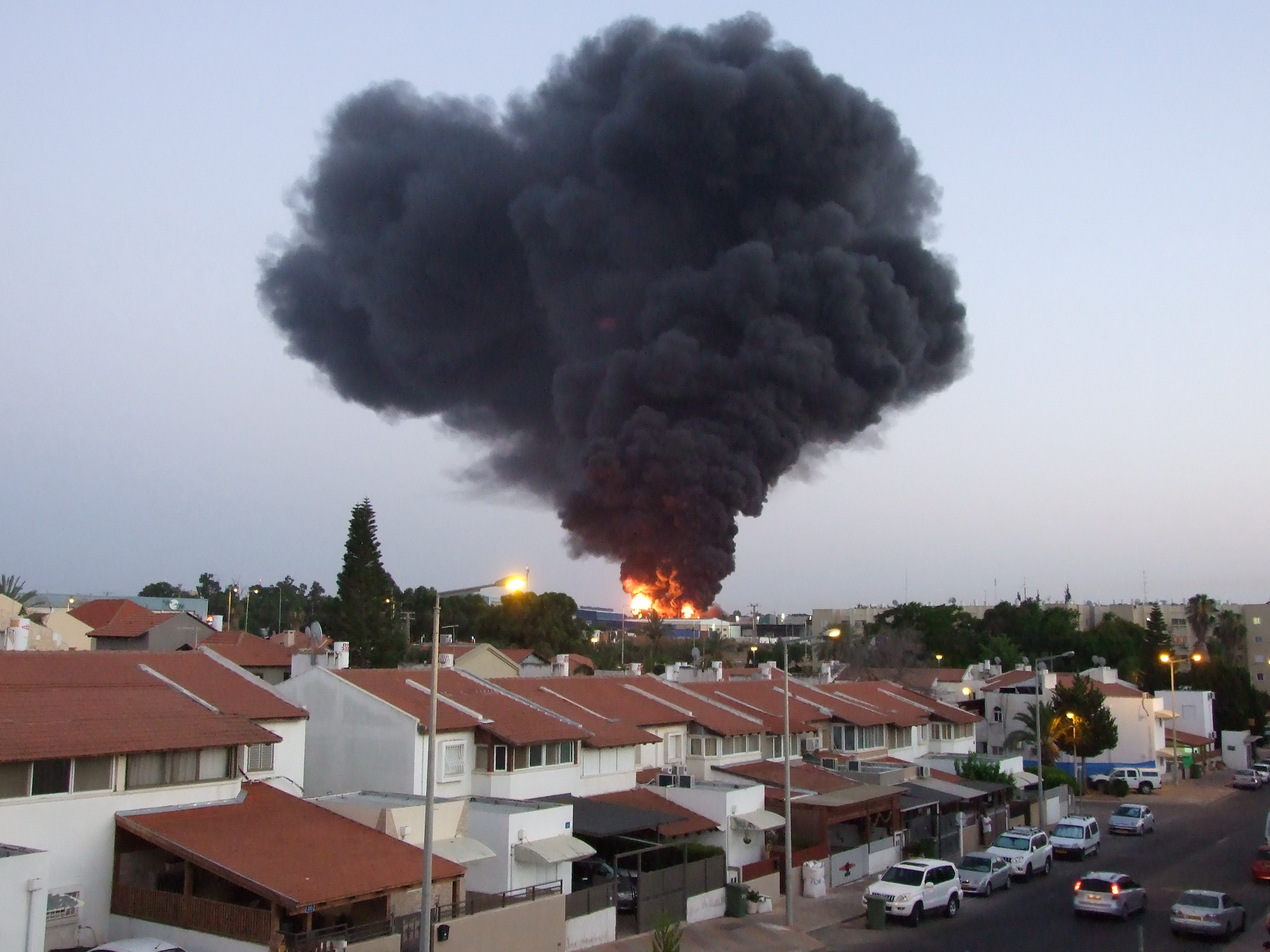
Burning factory in Sderot, which was hit by a rocket from Gaza on June 28

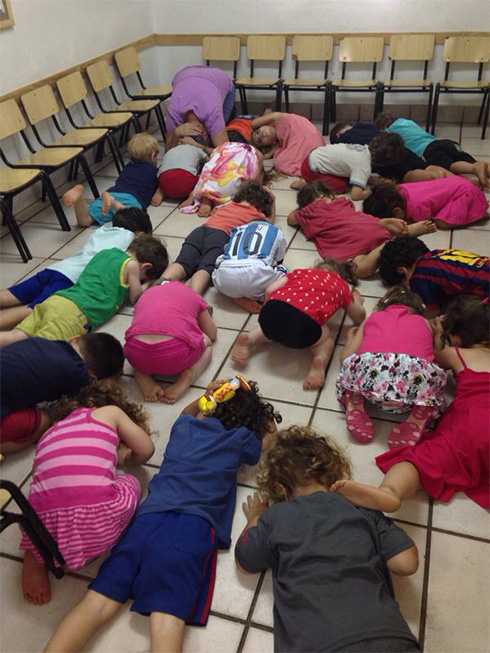
A kindergarten in central Israel during a rocket alarm

Throughout June about 62 rockets and 3 mortar shells were launched from Gaza in about 17 attacks towards Israel. These attacks caused property damage, but no deaths. Four were injured as a result of fire started by a rocket launch.

June 1

A rocket was fired early Sunday morning at the Eshkol region. The rocket landed in a field and no casualties were reported.

June 11

A rocket fired from Gaza narrowly missed a main artery in southern Israel as it landed in a nearby dirt field without causing any injuries.

June 14

2 of 3 rockets fired from Gaza fell in the Hof Ashkelon regional council in the afternoon. No injuries or damage were reported.

June 15

In Ashkelon a series of explosions were heard in the evening. 4 rockets were fired from Gaza, 2 of them were intercepted by the Iron Dome. Fragments of the rockets fell across the city. There were no reports of injuries or material damages.

June 16

A rocket from Gaza landed in an open area in the Ashkelon area. No damage or injuries.

June 18

2 rockets fired from Gaza hit into a Sha'ar Hanegev Regional Council community and caused light damage to a structure.

June 19

In the evening a rocket was fired from Gaza. It struck an open field near Sderot. Later again a rocket was fired at the city of Ashkelon. It was successfully intercepted by Iron Dome.

June 20

A Color Red siren alerting residents of a rocket launch from Gaza has been sounded in the Hof Ashkelon area, but the rocket did not make it outside of the Gaza strip.

June 21

Gaza Militants fired a rocket into direction of Hof Ashkelon Regional Council in southern Israel. No injuries, but damage caused to a road in Hof Ashkelon. In the evening three rockets were fired at the Sdot Negev and Sha'ar HaNegev Regional Councils. All rockets exploded in the open area. No damages or injuries were reported.

June 24

In the early evening Gaza Militants fired several rockets into Southern Israel. Two of the rockets were intercepted by the Iron Dome Missile Defense System, as the rockets would have hit inhabited areas. Targets have been Ashkelon and Sha'ar Hanegev Regional Council. Again a rocket landed in the South, in the Sdot Negev Regional Council. There were light damage, but no injuries were reported.

June 27

In the morning a mortar shell exploded near the border fence between Gaza and Israel. No one was hurt. A military vehicle operating in the area was lightly damaged. In the evening 6 rockets were launched from the Gaza strip. Sirens were heard in many areas to warn for incoming fire. 4 rockets fell in the open field. 2 were intercepted by the Iron Dome anti-missile system, as these rockets would have landed in populated areas of Ashekelon.

June 28

In the evening several rockets were fired from the Gaza strip. 2 rockets struck an industrial factory in Sderot, causing a fire. No one was hurt from any of the rockets, but the factory was burned to the ground. All other rockets exploded in the open area in Sdot Negev.

June 29

4 rockets were fired from Gaza into the South of Israel in the evening. 2 were intercepted by the Iron Dome. 2 fell in open area near the border fence.

June 30

The "Code Red" siren was heard all night. 16 rockets were launched from Gaza in the early morning hours. Most of the rockets landed in open areas of the Eshkol Regional Council region. Some went down in the Sedot Negev Regional Council community. One rocket caused light damage to a home. No people were thought to have been hurt. In the late night Gaza militants fired a rocket at Israel. The rocket landed in the open field in the Eshkol Regional Council. No injuries or damage were reported.

== July ==
In July, the number of rocket attacks launched toward Israel from Gaza increased dramatically. Eighty rockets were fired by Hamas and its allies on 7 July. On the following day, Israel launched Operation Protective Edge.

Date	Rockets launched							Effect of Rockets		Retaliation by Israel		Note
Date	Rockets	Mortars	Impacts on Israel				Impacts on Gaza	Killed	Injured	Killed	Injured	Note
Date	Rockets	Mortars	Uncategorized	Open areas	Intercepted	Urban areas	Impacts on Gaza	Killed	Injured	Killed	Injured	Note
1 July	4	5	—	3	—	3	3	—	—	2	4	
July 1. Details In the morning 4 more rockets were fired. One fell in an open area in Sdot Negev. Another caused damage to several vehicles in the Eshkol Regional Council. A third rocket exploded in the area Hof Ashkelon Regional Council. No injuries were reported. The fourth rocket caused a fire near a packaging factory in Eshkol. Though it looked like the fire were turned off, it has spread. Firefighting planes and additional squads try to stop the flames. So far no injuries are reported. In the evening a salvo of mortar shells was launched at the Eshkol Regional Council area. No red alert in advance, but Explosions were heard. Security forces are inspecting the area. No reports of injuries or damages.
2 July	13	6	1	19	1	—	—	—	—			
July 2. Details Shortly after midnight two mortar shells exploded in open areas in the Eshkol Regional Council. No damage or injuries are reported. In the afternoon three mortar shells were fired at the same region. All exploded in open fields. No injuries or damage reported. Again four mortar shells were fired in the Eshkol Regional Council. No one was hurt and no damage reported. In the evening code red alarm was heard in the Ashkelon area. One rocket was intercepted by the Iron Dome Missile Defense System, one exploded in open field. Red alert siren blared in the Eshkol and Sha'ar HaNegev Regional Councils. Minutes after 2 rockets landed in open areas around. Five rockets were launched on the Sdot Negev Regional Council, three were launched towards Ofakim. One was shot down by Iron Dome, the others hit open fields. No damage or injuries were reported. A rocket was fired on Eshkol Regional Council. No damages, no injuries.
3 July	13		Unknown									
July 3. Details 1 hour past midnight the color red siren is heard in Sderot and Sha'ar HaNegev Regional Council. One rocket exploded in Sderot. None was hurt, but structures got damaged. In the night and morning more than 10 rockets were fired at Southern Israel. Four of them hit homes in Sderot. One of them was a summer camp, but the rocket failed to explode, no one was injured. In the early afternoon a rocket from Gaza exploded near Sderot's industrial area. No injuries or damages were reported. Another one fell in an open area near Ofakim. Code Red sirens alerting residents of rocket launches from Gaza has been sounded in Sderot and the Sha'ar HaNegev Regional Council in the evening and later again in Sderot and the Eshkol Regional Council
4 July	21	4	Unknown									
July 4. Details This morning three rockets were fired at Sderot. Iron Dome intercepted one rocket, that would have hit the city. no injuries or damage were reported. Around noon two mortar shells fired from the Gaza Strip exploded near a community in the Eshkol Regional Council. No injuries or damages were reported. In the afternoon a rocket from Gaza came down just on the Israeli side of the border fence, aimed at IDF forces. Not long afterwards two rockets were intercepted by the Iron Dome, which would have hit Ofakim. Another one fell in the open field around. Several mortar rounds were also fired towards Keren Shalom, but only one fell in Israeli territory. A rocket was fired into the Eshkol Regional Council, it came down near the border fence. Another rocket fell in an open area. Five more rockets hit open fields in Eshkol. Another rocket hit Israel in the open area of Sderot. 25 rockets hit Israel today.
5 July	11	6	Unknown									
July 5. Details In the morning a rocket launched from Gaza exploded in the open field in the Eshkol Regional Council. No injuries were reported. In the afternoon a salvo of rockets and mortar shells was fired into Southern Israel. Two rockets and four mortar shells exploded in the Eshkol Regional Council, an IDF soldier got light injuries from shrapnel. A Color Red rocket alert sounded in Ofakim and the Merhavim Regional Council and shortly after a salvo of rockets was fired towards Ofakim, a city relatively distant from the Gaza Strip. One was intercepted by the Iron Dome, the others fell in open areas. In the evening rockets continued raining down at Southern Israel. The Iron Dome intercepted three rockets over the Hof Asheklon Regional Council. Two mortar shells fell in the Eshkol Regional Council. Another rocket hit Sha'ar HaNegev. One rocket was fired at the Negev's capital Beesheba, which was intercepted by the Iron Dome. It was the first time since the 2012 Operation Pillar of Defense that the Negev's capital was targeted by Gaza militants.
6 July	30		Unknown							2		
July 6. Details Around noon a rocket launched from Gaza exploded near a town in Sha'ar HaNegev Regional Council. No injuries and damages were reported. In the morning two rockets were launched towards Sderot. They fell in open areas. Around noon more than three rockets hit open areas in the Hof Ashkelon Regional Council. In the early afternoon at least four rockets hit a kibbutz in the Sha'ar Hanegev Regional Council. No injuries or damage were reported. Two rockets from Gaza landed in Eshkol. One of the rockets caused a small fire that was quickly extinguished. Two rocket hit the Sha'ar Hanegev Regional Council. In the afternoon and evening more than 25 rockets were fired from Gaza at Southern Israel.
7 July	80		Unknown							2	1	
July 7. Details In the morning a rocket launched from Gaza exploded at a community in Eshkol Regional Council. A soldier got lightly wounded. Several vehicles were damaged. Another rocket exploded in an open area. Prior to a Code Red alert a rocket exploded in an open area of Beersheba, one of Israel's largest cities, 50 kilometers away from the Gaza Strip. No injuries were reported. Around noon two rockets exploded in Southern Israel. One was intercepted over a local kibbutz by the Iron Dome, the second fell in an open area. No injuries were reported. Two more rockets landed in open fields of the Eshkol Regional Council. Additional rockets hit the Eshkol Region Council, adding up to 9. Several more times the Code Red alarm was heard in Eshkol and Sha'ar Hanegev regions. Since midnight 33 rockets and mortars hit Israel. In the evening Palestinians fired a barrage of 20–30 rockets at Southern Israel. There were no immediate reports of injuries. In this attack the Iron Dome defense system intercepted seven rockets over Ashdod and five over Ntivot. The military wing of Hamas Iz al-Din al-Qassam has officially taken responsibility for the latest barrage of rocket fire. They claim that they had shot about 100 rockets within a few minutes at Southern Israel. Three more rockets exploded in open terrain near Sderot and Sha'ar HaNegev. Iron Dome downs a rocket over Sderot. A Grade rocket exploded in a town next to Kiryat Malakhi causing damage. Today 80 rockets were launched by Palestinians from Gaza towards Israel.
8 July	156		117							24	19	
July 8. Details Rocket launches sites from July 8 to July 31. 157 rockets were fired from Gaza. In the early hours a rocket exploded in an open area in the Hof Ashkelon Regional Council. A rocket fired from Gaza was intercepted by the Iron Dome over the Sderot region. After strong increasing rocketfire attacks in the preceding days from Gaza towards Israel's Southern communities, the IDF announced the start of a military operation "Protective Edge" to stop the attacks Israel's citizens face on a daily basis. Rocket lands near empty house in a community in Hof Ashkelon Regional Council, fire erupts nearby. Two additional rockets exploded in open areas between Ashdod and Ashkelon. From the last 16 rockets, fired at Israel, 5 rockets were intercepted by the Iron Dome over Ashdod and Ashkelon. A Rocket exploded in open area south of Ashdod. The Islamic Jihad, the second most prominent militant group in the Gaza Strip after Hamas, has taken responsibility for at least 60 of the rockets fired at Israel. The Iron Dome intercepted a rocket over Ashkelon. Three rockets exploded in open areas in Eshkol Regional Council. Five more rockets exploded in open areas in Eshkol Regional Council. Red Color alert sounded in Ashdod. Iron Dome most likely intercepted the rocket over the city. Over Beersheba one rocket was intercepted by Iron Dome. A second rocket exploded in an open area outside the city. The Iron Dome intercepted two rockets over the city of Ashkelon. Two more rockets landed in open fields in the Eshkol Regional Council. No injuries or damages were reported. Code Red sirens were also heard over Sha'ar Hanegev and Ashkelon with a rocket exploding in an open area of Sdot HaNegev. The Iron Dome shot down a rocket over Ashkelon. An Iron Dome battery intercepted a rocket over Gedera. Code Red sounded in Tel Aviv for the first time since Operation Pillar of Defense in 2012. Iron Dome intercepted the rocket south of Tel Aviv. Islamic Jihad takes responsibility for firing rocket at Tel Aviv. Public bomb shelters are not only opened in Israel's South, but also in bigger cities in central Israel, like Tel Aviv and Jerusalem. Tel Aviv municipality now operating under emergency procedures. Rocket intercepted by Iron Dome over Ashkelon. Again Code Red siren in Tel Aviv, Givatayim, Rishon LeZion. Iron Dome intercepts rocket over Tel Aviv metropolitan area. Huge barrage of long-range rockets fired from the northern Gaza Strip. Rocket sirens sounding all across Israel. including Jerusalem and Tel Aviv. About 30 rockets fired at Israel in latest volley, at least 7 of them were long-range rockets. A rocket hits house in Mateh Yehuda Regional Council in Jerusalem district; no injuries. One rocket explodes in Jerusalem area; no injuries or damage. The IDF confirms that a rocket fired from Gaza hit the city of Hadera, 100 km away from Gaza. The rocket that hit Hadera is an M-302 type rocket, similar to the ones found on board the Klos-c, a vessel on which was an Iranian shipment of advanced weaponry intended for militant organizations operating in the Gaza Strip the IDF intercepted on March 5. On board the Klos-C were forty M-302 rockets reaching up-to the range of 160 kilometers. The Iron Dome intercepted rockets over the City Rishon Lezion, which is close to Tel Aviv. Rocket exploded in open area near Pisgat Zeev in East Jerusalem. Iron Dome intercepts at least one rocket over Southern Tel Aviv. Rocket explodes near Nizanim junction in south; no injuries. A grade rocket was located in Ashdod; no injuries. After a rocket exploded near Rishon LeZion a fire broke out. No injuries. 117 rockets struck Israel in the past 24 hours & an additional 29 were intercepted by the Iron Dome.
9 July	130		90							38	280	
July 9. Details 130 rockets were fired from Gaza. A rocket was fired at the Eshkol Regional Council shortly after midnight. The Iron Dome intercepted at least 2 rockets over Be'er Sheva. Three rockets exploded in open areas around. No injuries. In the morning around 8.30am local time, rocket sirens sound in 20 different localities in Israel, so it was heard in Tel Aviv, Modi'in, Rishon Letzion, Ashdod, Ashkelon, Rehovot, the Eshkol regional council, and Sha'ar Hanegev. The Iron Dome intercepted five missiles over the Tel Aviv area. The Iron Dome intercepted 3 rockets over the city of Ashkelon. Since early hours of Wednesday morning 22 rockets exploded in the Negev and Hevel Lakhish (Part of the southern Shfela). A rocket barrage was fired at Eshkol Regional Council, two rockets exploded in open areas. The Iron Dome intercepted again 3 rockets over Ashdod. A rocket explosion caused a fire in Shaffir Regional Council. Two Rockets exploded in Eshkol Regional Council, no injuries reported. Three rockets exploded in an open area in Kiryat Malachi and Be'er Tuvia. No injuries reported. A Rocket exploded in open terrain in Sha'ar HaNegev Regional Council. Iron Dome intercepted 3 rockets over Kiryat Gat. Iron Dome intercepted rocket over Sderot. Two rockets exploded in Hof Hacarmel Regional Council. A rocket explosion caused a fire in a field near Sderot. Four rockets landed in Eshkol Regional Council, one of them started a fire, which was extinguished shortly after. A rocket fired at Ashkelon was shot down by Iron Dome. Iron Dome intercepts rocket fired at Mateh Yehuda Regional Council. Sirens blared in Holon, Bat Yam, Rishon LeZion, Tel Aviv. The Iron Dome intercepted a rocket over Tel Aviv. Six rockets fall in open areas in Eshkol; no injuries. Rocket fell in open area in Sdot Negev Regional Council. Three additional rockets exploded in Eshkol, one hits house, no injuries. Three rockets exploded in open fields in Merhavim Regional Council. Rocket landed in open area in Sdot Negev Regional Council. 2 mortar shells hit house and structure in community in Sha'ar HaNegev. Iron Dome intercepts rocket over Ashkelon. Sirens were heard in Dimona, which is the location of a nuclear reactor, and Yeruham for the first time since the beginning of Operation Protective Edge. Three rockets were launched. One was intercepted by the Iron Dome, two land in open areas. There was no indication that rockets damaged any part of the reactor. Iron Dome intercepts rocket over the area of Rehovot. Fire breaks out in Hof Ashkelon Regional Council following explosion of rocket in open area. A rocket exploded in open terrain in Yeruham, caused brush fire. The Iron Dome missile defense system has achieved a nearly 90% success rate since Monday night, an improvement over its performance during Operation Pillar of Defense in November 2012 Rocket exploded in open area in Netivot. Sirens sound in many different locations. Shortly after a salvo of 15 rockets were fired at Israel. All of them were either intercepted or fell in open areas. Today over 100 rockets were launched from Gaza. 82 hit Israel, 21 rockets were intercepted by the Iron Dome.
10 July	197		141						1	23	230	
July 10. Details 197 rockets were fired from Gaza. Shortly after midnight two rockets are intercepted by the Iron Dome over Kiryat Malachi. 10 cows killed, caused by a rocket exploding in Be'er Tuvia Regional Council. The Iron Dome intercepted 3 rockets over Beersheba. Two more rockets were shot down by Iron Dome over Beesheba, one other landed in open area. No injuries were reported. A number of rockets aiming on Ashkelon were intercepted by Iron Dome. Four missiles were intercepted over Tel Aviv. The sirens were immediately followed by explosions, most likely the sound of the rocket being intercepted. Large pieces of shrapnels fell on streets of Southern Tel Aviv. No injuries were reported. Iron intercepted two rockets in central Israel. A rocket fired from Gaza exploded in open territory in the Merhavim Regional. No injuries were reported. Council. The Iron Dome intercepted a rocket above the community of Netivot. Two fell in open areas nearby. A rocket fired from the Gaza fell in open territory in the Sdot Negev Regional Council causing a brush fire. No one was injured. Two mortar rounds from Gaza hit Eshkol. No injuries were reported. A rocket fell in the garden of a home in the Netivot area of southern Israel. A woman got lightly injured in the attack. Three rockets land in open territory in Sde Boker in the Negev after Code Red sirens had earlier gone off in Dimona, Yeruham and Mitzpe Ramon. Around noon A code red siren sounded in the Greater Tel Aviv area. At least two audible explosions were heard following the alarm. Two rockets land in the Eshkol Regional Council area. No injuries or damage reported. Two rockets land in the Eshkol Regional Council area. No injuries or damage reported. A wheat field in the Sha'ar Hanegev Regional Council caught fire as the result of a rocket. Rockets fired at Tel Aviv area landed in uninhabited region. No injuries or damage reported. A salvo of about 20 rockets were fired at central and southern Israel. The Iron Dome intercepted 8 of them above the Shfela area (Judean foothills). Explosions were heard in Tel Aviv. A rocket fired at the Merhavim region of the South sparked a brush fire. Firefighters were on the scene. The Iron Dome intercepted three rockets over Beersheba. Iron Dome shot down a rocket over Sdot Negev Regional Council. Iron Dome intercepted two rockets over Ashdod. A rocket exploded in open area in Eshkol starting a fire. 3 mortars strike open area in Eshkol causing again fire. Iron Dome intercepted a rocket over Ashkelon. A rocket exploded just outside a town in Eshkol. No injuries were reported. A rocket fell in open area in Sdot Negev Regional Council. A rocket exploded in Sderot area, caused damage to nearby vehicles. A rocket landed in a Ramle market injuring one man. Four rockets fell in open area of Sdot Negev Regional Council. Nine rockets landed in Eshkol Regional Council, two of them landed in a community. There were no injuries reported, but a road has been damaged. A rocket struck a home in the Sha'ar Hanegev Regional Council. No injuries were reported. In the early evening Tel Aviv residents reported about hearing two explosions, though no siren was heard. Later it is reported that the Iron Dome defense system intercepted a number of rockets at the greater Tel Aviv area. A volley of rockets targeted the Ashdod area. The Iron Dome made several interceptions. A number of rockets were fired at the area again minutes later. A home was struck. 2 soldiers got injured, one moderately, one lightly from Eshkol mortar. Rocket hit home in Sha'ar HaNegev Regional Council, no injuries reported. Iron dome intercepted two rockets over Jerusalem. There were reports about loud explosions in Gush Dan. Iron Dome intercepted six rockets over Gush Dan. Four people were injured following rocket fire on Be'er Sheva. Rocket landed near gymnasium in Be'er Sheva, several people treated for anxiety. A barrage of 20 long range rockets were fired at Negev. Rockets land in Bedouin communities Lakia, Aroer; no injuries reported. The Iron Dome intercepted two rockets above Kiryat Malakhi. A rocket exploded in open area in Gan Yavne. In Ashdod a house got a direct hit. A fire broke out, nearby gas tanks exploded. Also with a direct hit a vehicle were set on fire. No injuries were reported. Three rockets land in open area in Sdot Negev. Today, 192 rockets were fired towards Israel. A total of 141 of them hit Israel, and an additional 44 were intercepted by Iron Dome.
11 July	138		>107						7	23	170	
July 11. Details A total 137 rockets were fired from Gaza. The Iron Dome intercepted a rocket over Ashkelon. Rockets were fired from Gaza on Haifa, Hadera, and Zichron Yaakov. It was not yet clear how many rockets were fired or where they landed. A volley of rockets was launched from the Gaza Strip at southern and central Israel. One rocket struck a fuel tank next to a gas station in Ashdod, causing serious damage and a fire. Eight people were evacuated to a nearby hospital, one critically injured.
12 July	125		117						2	48	235	
July 12. Details A total 125 rockets were fired from Gaza.
13 July	150		102							13	149	
July 13. Details 130 rockets were fired from Gaza.
14 July	122		>92						3	16	177	
July 14. Details 115 rockets were fired from Gaza.
15 July	146		122					1	4	10	140	
July 15. Details 156 rockets were fired from Gaza.
16 July	110		82							25	124	
July 16. Details 132 rockets were fired from Gaza.
17 July	162		>118					1	21	160		
July 17. Details 162 rockets were fired from Gaza.
18 July	124		87							54	235	
July 18. Details 124 rockets were fired from Gaza.
19 July	116		88						6	50	480	
July 19. Details 116 rockets were fired from Gaza, one killing an Israeli in a Bedouin village near Dimona.
20 July	87		70							122	300	
July 20. Details 87 rockets were fired from Gaza.
21 July	139		116							116	545	
July 21. Details 82 rockets were fired from Gaza, 14 of which were intercepted by Iron Dome. Rocket strikes were reported in Sderot, Ashkelon, near Rosh Ha'ayin, and in Shaar Hanegev, causing damage to an empty kindergarten.
22 July	90		70						1	52	455	
July 22. Details 87 rockets were fired from Gaza, 18 of which were intercepted.
23 July	98		70							71	460	
July 23. Details 98 rockets were fired from Gaza. A foreign laborer was killed in Ashkelon by a rocket.
24 July	63		47					1	1	91	570	
July 24. Details 63 rockets were fired from Gaza.
25 July	80		Unknown							59	50	
July 25. Details 80 rockets were fired from Gaza.
26 July	22		16							58	60	
July 26. Details 22 rockets were fired from Gaza.
27 July	71		50						1	12	1000	
July 27. Details 71 rockets were fired from Gaza.
28 July	66		No report					4	7	74	610	
July 28. Details 66 rockets were fired from Gaza.
29 July	79		No report							118	270	
July 29. Details 79 rockets were fired from Gaza.
30 July	141									107	450	
July 30. Details A total 141 rockets were fired from Gaza.
31 July	95							5	7	60	630	
July 31. Details Five Israeli soldiers were killed by Hamas mortar attack in Eshkol region

== August ==
=== 8 August ===
During the night at 4:02, Palestinians have fired a rocket into the Eshkol Regional Council hours before the end of the ceasefire, although Hamas officials have denied the accusations of a rocket being fired

=== 20 August ===
168 rockets were launched toward Israel, the highest number since the starting of protective edge operation.

Totals for August
Missiles launched		Effect of missiles		Retaliation by Israel	
Rockets	Mortars	Killed	Injured	Killed	Injured
950		2	19	540	1913

== September ==
September 16

A mortar was fired from Gaza into an area near Eshkol and Sdot Negev. Hamas denied reaponsibility.

== October ==
October 31

A rocket was launched from Gaza into southern Israel without causing harm.

== December ==
December 19

A rocket from Gaza was fired into Israel, exploding in open territory near the Eshkol Regional Council. No injuries or damage were reported. In response, the following day IDF struck a site belonging to Hamas in southern Gaza near Khan Yunis. Israeli Defense Minister Moshe Ya'alon reported that the target was a factory making cement that would be used to build tunnels.
