= Al-Watan (Palestine) =

Defunct Hamas publication

Al-Watan (lit. 'The Homeland') was a weekly publication by Hamas until its closure in February 1996 after repeated pressure and suspensions by the Palestinian Authority.

== History ==
Al-Watan was one of the most important opposition periodicals published in the Palestinian Authority (PA)-controlled areas. PA officials used the ambiguity of the 1995 Palestinian press law and control over granting news licenses to temper criticism and silence opposition voices, including al-Watan.

In 1995, the PA twice suspended al-Watan for 3-month periods, beginning in May and in August, without explanation. According to the publication's editor, the August suspension followed the publication by al-Watan of an article stating that Yasir Arafat had accepted money for allowing a European news agency to publish a photograph of his infant daughter.

In May 1995, al-Watan's editor Sayed Musa Abu Musameh was sentenced to prison for 2 years by the state security court in Gaza on charges of incitement against the PA. When the ban on al-Watan was lifted in October 1995, he was still in prison. In February 1996, Palestinian authorities closed al-Watan along with al-Istiqlal, the press organ of Palestinian Islamic Jihad. Al-Watan was permanently closed in early 1996 following a series of Hamas bombings in Israel.

== al-Risala ==
Subsequently, Hamas affiliate Islamic Salvation Party began publishing al-Risala ('The Message') on 1 January 1997, which while critical of the PA, avoided issues considered too incendiary. Hamas official Ghazi Hamad, chief editor of al-Watan, became head of al-Risala.

Al-Risala was closed repeatedly by the Palestinian Authority for its criticism of Yasir Arafat at the Oslo peace process. In 1997, it was shut down by the PA after it published an article on Egypt's support of the PA deemed offensive to Egyptian president Hosni Mubarak. Supreme Court Chief Justice Qusai Abdallah was forced to resign in January 1998 after giving an interview to al-Risala. In 2004, al-Risala was described as the main opposition newspaper in Gaza against the PA.

In 2011, the Palestinian Authority barred pro-Hamas publications like al-Risala and As'ada magazine from being brought into the West Bank and did not permit the publications to operate bureaus in the area. The bans were criticized by Human Rights Watch.
