= Ghazi Hamad =

Senior Hamas member (born 1964)

Ghāzi Hamad
- غازي حمد
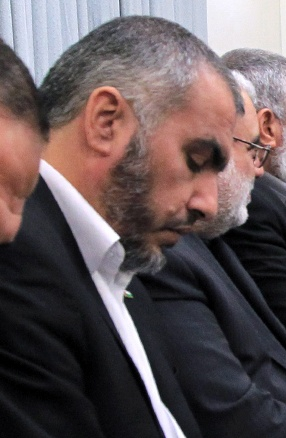
- Hamad at a meeting with Iranian Supreme Leader Ali Khamenei in 2012

Personal details
- Born: 1964 (age 61–62) Yibna refugee camp, Gaza Strip
- Party: Hamas

Ghāzi Hamad (Arabic: غازي حمد; born 1964) is a senior Hamas member. He was formerly the chairman of the border crossings authority in the Gaza Strip and Deputy Foreign Minister in the Hamas government of 2012.

According to the New York Times, Hamad left Gaza for Lebanon weeks before the October 7 attacks that triggered the Gaza war.

== Early life ==
Originally from Yibna, Hamad was born in 1964 in the Yibna refugee camp, located along Gaza's border with Egypt at Rafah Governorate. His father, a member of Palestinian fedayeen, was executed in the 1970s. In 1982, Hamad joined Hamas, an affiliate of the Muslim Brotherhood, by taking an oath of allegiance to one of its founders Issa al-Nashar.

He earned a bachelor's degree in veterinary medicine in Sudan. He speaks both English and Hebrew in addition to his native Arabic, having learnt both languages while imprisoned in Israel.

Hamad was imprisoned by Israel from 1989 to 1994, and several times by the Palestinian Authority (PA) during the 1990s.

== Journalism ==
Hamad was editor-in-chief of Hamas weekly publication al-Watan until its closure in February 1996 after repeated pressure and suspensions by the Palestinian Authority. Hamad subsequently became editor-in-chief of Hamas-affiliated publication al-Risala (The Message) on 1 January 1997, which while critical of the PA, avoided issues considered too incendiary. As editor of al-Risala, Hamad was imprisoned multiple times for publishing articles critical to the reputation of the PA, particularly its prison system.

== Hamas political activity ==
As of October 2004, Hamad was the head of the Islamic Salvation Party, formed in the 1990s and considered an unofficial political wing of Hamas that is more pragmatic than the Hamas rank and file.

Hamad assumed the role of “the new public face” (spokesman) for Hamas in January 2006.

In August 2006, he wrote an article for Al Ayyam, a Palestinian daily newspaper, stating that "Gaza is suffering under the yoke of anarchy and the swords of thugs", and "[i]t is strange that, when a big effort is taken to reopen Rafah crossing to ease the suffering of the people, you see others who go to shell rockets towards the crossing. Or when someone talks about cease-fire and its importance, you find those who go and shell more rockets. Of course, I do not deny that the occupation committed massacres that cannot be justified. But I support negotiations over what can be fixed."

In 2006, Hamad was quoted as saying "Israel should be wiped from the face of the Earth. It is an animal state that recognizes no human worth. It is a cancer that should be eradicated."

On 31 May 2007, Hamad stated his willingness to accept a Palestinian state within the pre-1967 borders. On 23 September 2011, after Mahmoud Abbas formally asked the United Nations for Palestinian statehood, Hamad stated that Hamas was not consulted, and that the Palestinian territories were ill-prepared for it.

=== Statements since the 2023 Hamas–Israel war ===
On 24 October 2023, while member of the decision-making Hamas Political Bureau, in an interview for the Lebanese Broadcasting Corporation (LBC), Hamad reiterated that Israel should be destroyed, and stated that Hamas should repeat the October 7 attacks, using its Hamas-given operational name: "We must teach Israel a lesson, and we will do it twice and three times. The al-Aqsa Deluge is just the first time." The LBC interview was quoted in many English languages media sources, and originally translated by MEMRI. He also claimed that Hamas did not intend to harm civilians, but there were "complications" on the ground. Hamad also said: "We are the victims of the occupation. Period. Therefore, nobody should blame us for the things we do. On 7 October, 10 October, one-millionth October, everything we do is justified."

On 24 August 2024, Hamad said that the 7 October attacks successfully disrupted Arab–Israeli normalization and led to increased recognition of Palestinian statehood. Hamad also reiterated the group's refusal to recognize Israel, stating: "we will never accept anything less than the historical Palestine. We do not believe in a two-state solution. We will never recognize Israel, and [although] we might accept the creation of a Palestinian state or a Palestinian entity on the '67 borders with its capital as east Jerusalem, we would never recognize Israel."

On 25 September 2025, in an interview for CNN, Hamad was asked whether Hamas shared some culpability for the high number of casualties in the war that escalated following Hamas's attack on Israel. He refused to take any responsibility for the events unfolding in Gaza and said: "I know the price (is) so high, but I’m asking again, what is the option?". Acoording to CNN: "Rather than taking responsibility for the role of the attack in triggering Israel’s devastating assault on Gaza, he made clear he believes the Palestinian cause has been boosted by Hamas’s attack". When shown videos of Gazans urging Hamas to give up power and protesting against the Hamas leadership, which resides in hotels while they suffer, Hamad refused to watch the video for more than a few seconds. He stated that he knew Gazans were suffering, but he blamed Israel for their disgruntlement. When asked why the Red Cross was not allowed to examine the hostages, he responded that the situation on the ground was "complicated".

== Dialogue with Gershon Baskin ==
For many years, Hamad maintained an amicable back channel dialogue with Israeli peace activist Gershon Baskin, which came to an end after the October 7 attacks. Their behind-the-scenes negotiations led to the release of Israeli soldier Gilad Shalit in 2011. In October 2023, Baskin noted that Hamad's statements on 24 October 2023 about the Al-Aqsa Flood of 7 October (see above) had struck him as “a betrayal” because it shattered his idea of Hamad as a “moderate” Hamas member and a “thoughtful observer”. However, by early 2024, Hamad and Baskin had both decided to reconnect. “The first communication was about two months ago, which was an unpleasant back and forth,” Baskin told The Guardian in March 2024. “The basic question is, could it be possible for us to have a constructive role [in making] a secret back channel,” Baskin added. “It's not yet clear.”

== See also ==
- Gershon Baskin
