= Ziad Al-Zaza =

Palestinian politician (1955–2022)

Deputy Prime Minister of the Gaza Strip
- In office 9 September 2012 – 2 June 2014
- Prime Minister: Ismail Haniyeh

Minister of Finance and Economy of the Gaza Strip
- In office 14 June 2007 – 2 June 2014
- Prime Minister: Ismail Haniyeh

Minister of National Economy
- In office 17 March 2007 – 14 June 2007
- Prime Minister: Ismail Haniyeh
- Preceded by: Alaa Al-Araj
- Succeeded by: Muhammad Kamal Hassouna

Minister of Transport and Communications
- In office 29 March 2006 – 17 March 2007
- Prime Minister: Ismail Haniyeh
- Preceded by: Saad Eddin Kharma
- Succeeded by: Saadi Karnz

Personal details
- Born: 28 November 1955 Gaza City, All-Palestine Protectorate
- Died: 9 February 2022 (aged 66) Gaza City, Palestine
- Party: Hamas
- Children: 9
- Education: Alexandria University
- Profession: Politician, civil engineer

Ziad Al-Zaza (Arabic: زياد الظاظا; 28 November 1955 – 9 February 2022) was a Palestinian politician and civil engineer.

== Biography ==
A member of Hamas, he served as Minister of Transport and Communications with the Palestinian National Authority from 2006 to 2007 and was Minister of National Economy from 17 March to 14 June 2007.

Al-Zaza died from COVID-19 in Gaza City, on 9 February 2022, at the age of 66.

Political offices
Preceded by Saad Eddin Kharma	Minister of Transport and Communications; 2006–2007	Succeeded by Saadi Karnz
Preceded by Alaa Al-Araj	Minister of National Economy; 2007	Succeeded by Muhammad Kamal Hassouna
