= Muhammad Kamal Hassouna =

Palestinian politician and lawyer (1942–2026)

Muhammad Kamal Hassouna

Muhammad Kamal Hassouna (Arabic: محمد كمال حسونة; 21 March 1942 – 21 March 2026) was a Palestinian politician and businessman.

== Life and career ==
Hassouna was born in Hebron on 21 March 1942. He received his schooling in Madinah, then left Egypt to study law, where he obtained a bachelor's degree from Cairo University in 1969.

He worked as a lawyer for only two years, then went to work in free trade, where he contributed to the establishment of several factories and companies such as the Islamic Takaful Insurance Company, Safa Islamic Bank and the Palestinian Mineral Oil Company (Petropal), and he was also a member of the Red Crescent Society in Hebron and president of the Family Planning Society, the Housing Association in Hebron, and one of the founders of the Businessmen Association in Ramallah and Jerusalem, and the Federation of Palestinian Industries, which he later chaired. He was a member of the Board of Trustees of Bethlehem University, and also on the Board of Trustees of An-Najah National University.

On 14 June 2007, he was appointed Minister of National Economy, Public Works, Housing, Communications and Information Technology in the 12th Palestinian government headed by Salam Fayyad, a position he held until 19 May 2009.

Hassouna died on 21 March 2026 on his 84th birthday.
