= Hamas most wanted playing cards =

Deck of playing cards featuring Hamas members

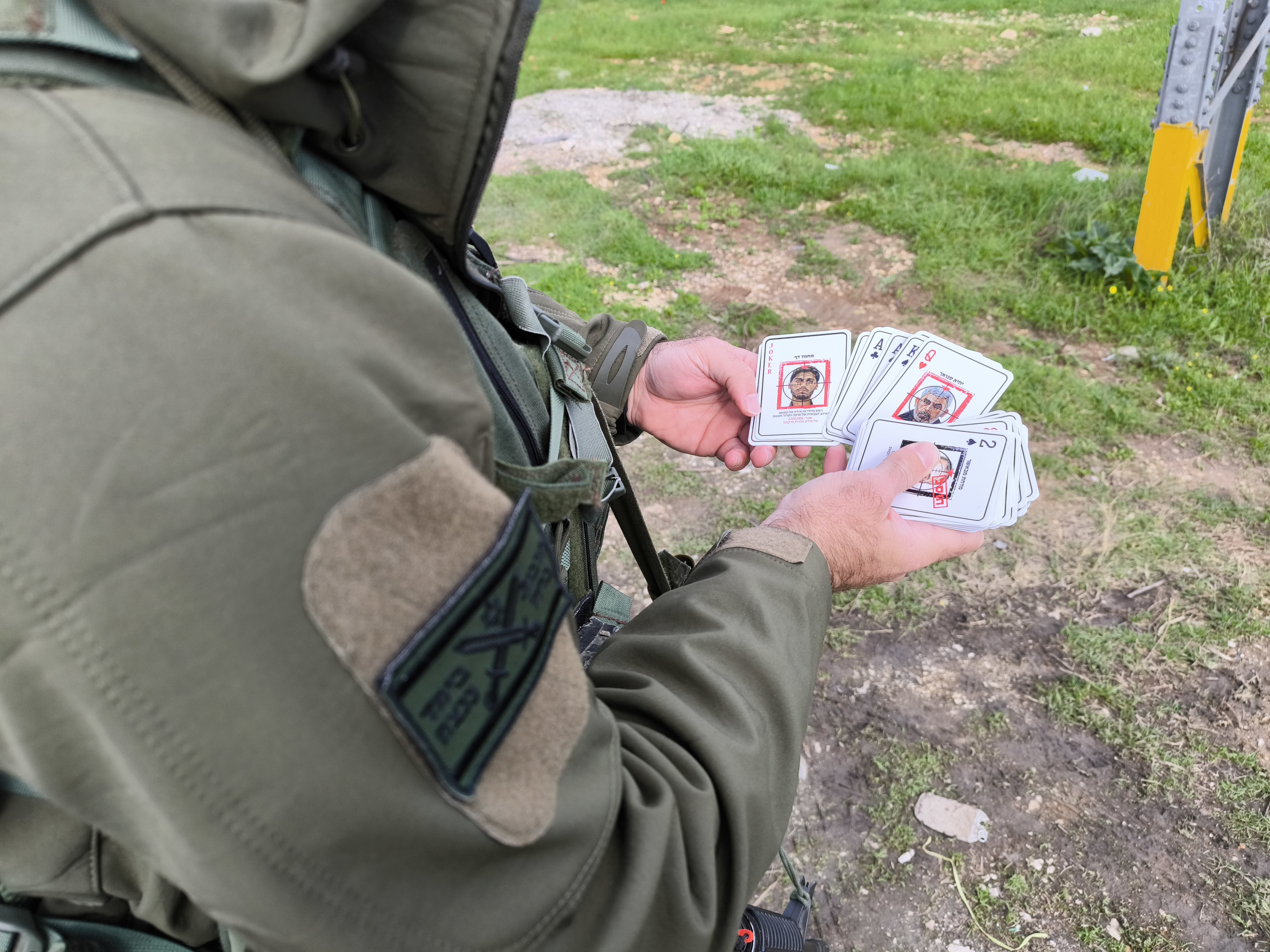
IDF soldier holding a package of Hamas most wanted cards.

The Hamas most wanted cards are decks of playing cards featuring pictures of Hamas members wanted by Israel. The decks were produced by independent volunteers and were handed out to Israel Defense Forces soldiers during the early stages of the Gaza war.

== Unofficial IDF deck ==
In the early days of the Gaza war, more an unofficial card deck of 54 wanted senior Hamas figures was distributed to Israeli soldiers. The idea for the deck was inspired by the most-wanted Iraqi playing cards created by the U.S. Defense Intelligence Agency for identifying the top wanted members of Saddam Hussein's government during the 2003 invasion of Iraq. The history of making similar decks dates back to the American Civil War. The purpose of the deck was three-fold: 1) help IDF soldiers identify Hamas figures in the field; 2) killing or capturing the subjects of the cards would represent the end of the war; 3) demonstrate Israeli resolve and unsettle Hamas figures hiding in bunkers and tunnels. More than 10,000 decks of the cards were distributed to Israeli soldiers. It is unclear who is behind the decks.

As of May 2026, 39 people from the list had been killed.

=== List of cards ===
Card	Person	Position	Status
JOKER	Mohammed Deif	Head of Izz ad-Din al-Qassam Brigades	Assassinated in July 2024.
JOKER	Saleh al-Arouri	Deputy head of Hamas	Assassinated in January 2024.
A ♠	Abu Obeida	Spokesperson of Izz ad-Din al-Qassam Brigades	Assassinated in August 2025.
A ♣	Marwan Issa	Deputy Commander of Izz ad-Din al-Qassam Brigades	Assassinated in March 2024.
A ♦	Ismail Haniyeh	Head of Hamas Political Bureau	Assassinated in July 2024.
A ♥	Khaled Mashal	Former head of Hamas Political Bureau	
K ♠	Issam al-Da'alis	Head of Hamas government in Gaza	Killed in March 2025. (Note: Previously allegedly killed in July 2024 (and alleged Hamas confirmation of this in January 2025), according to Saudi newspaper Asharq Al-Aawsat.)
K ♣	Rawhi Mushtaha	Chairman of the economic committee	Killed in July 2024.
K ♦	Khalil al-Hayya	Deputy head of Hamas's Political Bureau	
K ♥	Asem Abu Rakaba	Head of the air wing	Killed in October 2023.
Q ♠	Sameh al-Sarraj	Member of Hamas's Political Bureau	Killed in July 2024.
Q ♣	Izz al-Din al-Haddad	Commander of Gaza City Division (al-Qassam Brigades)	Assassinated in May 2026.
Q ♦	Ayman Siam	Head of the rockets array	Killed in November 2023.
Q ♥	Yahya Sinwar	Leader of Hamas in Gaza	Killed in October 2024.
J ♠	Mohammed Sinwar	Commander of the Southern Gaza Strip Division (al-Qassam Brigades)	Assassinated in May 2025.
J ♣	Ayman Nofal	Commander of the Central Gaza Strip	Killed in October 2023.
J ♦	Rafa Salama	Commander of the Khan Yunis Brigade (al-Qassam Brigades)	Assassinated in July 2024.
J ♥	Ahmad Ghandour	Commander of the Northern Gaza Strip	Killed in November 2023.
10 ♠	Youssef Abu al-Rish	Deputy Health Minister	
10 ♣	Fa'ez Baroud	Commander in al-Qassam Brigades	
10 ♦	Osama Hamdan	Foreign relations officer	
10 ♥	Mohammed Odeh	Head of Hamas intelligence	Assassinated in May 2026.
9 ♠	Ali al-Amoudi	Head of the Media Department	
9 ♣	Muhammad Atzar	Head of the anti-tank forces in Gaza	Killed in November 2023.
9 ♦	Zakaria Abu Maamar	Senior member of Hamas's Political Bureau	Killed in October 2023.
9 ♥	Mahmoud al-Zahar	Member of Hamas Political Bureau	
8 ♠	Ahmed Shamali	Deputy commander of Gaza City Brigade	Killed in March 2025.
8 ♣	Shadi Baroud	Deputy head of intelligence	Killed in October 2023.
8 ♦	Mousa Abu Marzook	Head of international relations office	
8 ♥	Razi Abu Tama'ah	Head of the combat support array	Killed in March 2024.
7 ♠	Imad Aqel	Head of rear headquarters	
7 ♣	Zahar Jabarin	Deputy head of the West Bank region (successor of al-Arouri)	
7 ♦	Abd al-Hadi Siam	Commander in the Izz ad-Din al-Qassam Brigades	Killed in August 2024.
7 ♥	Haitham Khuwajari	Commander of Shati Battalion (al-Qassam Brigades)	(Note: The IDF made a claim that he had been killed in December 2023, but retracted it in February 2025.)
6 ♠	Ibrahim Biari	Commander of Jabalia Center Brigade	Killed in October 2023.
6 ♣	Wissam Farhat	Commander of Shuja'iyya Battalion	Killed in December 2023.
6 ♦	Wael Rajab	Deputy commander of the Northern Gaza Strip	Killed in November 2023.
6 ♥	Muhammad Shabana	Commander of the Rafah Brigade	Assassinated in May 2025.
5 ♠	Nasim Abu Ajina	Commander of Beit Lahiya Brigade	Killed in October 2023.
5 ♣	Ibrahim al-Sahar	Commander of the explosive devices in the Northern Strip	Killed in October 2023.
5 ♦	Jaber Aziz	Commander of the Al-Furqan Battalion	Killed in August 2024.
5 ♥	Hassam Badran	Member of the Executive Committee	
4 ♠	Taysir Mabasher	Commander of the Northern Khan Yunis brigade	Killed in October 2023.
4 ♣	Mustafa Dalul	Commander of Zabara Battalion	Killed in November 2023.
4 ♦	Fathi Hamad	Head of office in the Executive Committee	
4 ♥	Ra'ad Sa'ad	Commander in the Izz ad-Din al-Qassam Brigades	Killed in December 2025.
3 ♠	Yakub A'ashur	Commander of the anti-tank system in Khan Yunis	Killed in November 2023.
3 ♣	Ghazi Hamad	Member of Hamas's Political Bureau	
3 ♦	Ismail Siraj	Commander of Nuseirat Battalion	Killed in January 2024.
3 ♥	Ra'ad Thabat	Member of Hamas's Political Bureau	Killed in March 2024.
2 ♠	Madhat Mabasher	Commander of the West Khan Yunis Battalion	Killed in October 2023.
2 ♣	Mahdi Khuwara	Commander of South Khan Younis Battalion	Assassinated in May 2025.
2 ♦	Mohammed Alwadia	Commander of the anti-tank system of the Gaza City Brigade (al-Qassam Brigades)	Killed in October 2023.
2 ♥	Nizar Awadallah	Senior member of Hamas Political Bureau	

== Christian cowboy deck ==
Following the October 7 attacks, a group of Christian Zionist cowboys who had come to volunteer on farms in Israel, and on settler farms in the occupied West Bank, designed and printed another deck of cards with Hamas personalities and distributed the cards to Israeli soldiers in southern Israel and Gaza. The cards were designed and printed by Be'eri Printers at Kibbutz Be'eri, one of the hardest hit kibbutzim during the October 7 attack.

The deck was printed in Hebrew, English, and Arabic, and included two joker cards and 12 Hamas personalities, including Ismail Haniyeh, Yahya Sinwar, Abu Obaida, Mohammed Deif, Marwan Issa, Salah al-Arouri, Khaled Mashal, Fathi Hamad, Ra'ad Sa'ad, Muhammad Sinwar. The depictions in these cards, from the drawings of the subjects to how their names were written in Arabic, are intended to mock the Hamas leaders. For example, Yahya Sinwar is written as "Sinfar", a play on the Arabic word for mouse, الْفَأْر al-faʔr, and his picture depicts him as a mouse.

== See also ==
- Most-wanted Iraqi playing cards
- List of leaders of Hamas
