= History of Hamas =

The history of Hamas is an account of the Palestinian nationalist and Islamist – described by some as fundamentalist – socio-political organization based in the Gaza Strip with an associated paramilitary force, the Ezzedeen al-Qassam Brigades. Hamas (حماس) Ḥamās is an acronym of حركة المقاومة الاسلامية Ḥarakat al-Muqāwamat al-Islāmiyyah, meaning "Islamic Resistance Movement".

Hamas was established during the First intifada against the Israeli occupation in 1987, and has its origins in Egypt's Muslim Brotherhood movement, which had been active in the Gaza Strip since the 1950s and gained influence through a network of mosques and various charitable and social organizations. In the 1980s the Brotherhood emerged as a powerful political factor, challenging the influence of the PLO, and in 1987 adopted a more nationalist and activist line under the name of Hamas. Hamas was initially discreetly supported by Israel as a counter-balance to the secular PLO. During the 1990s and early 2000s, the organization conducted numerous suicide bombings and other attacks against Israel.

In the Palestinian legislative election of January 2006, Hamas campaigned on armed resistance against the Israeli occupation and gained a large majority of seats in the Palestinian Parliament, defeating the ruling Fatah party. After the elections, conflicts arose between Hamas and Fatah, which they were unable to resolve. In June 2007, Hamas defeated Fatah in a series of violent clashes, and since that time Hamas has governed the Gaza portion of the Palestinian Territories, while at the same time the unity government of which they formed a part in the West Bank was dissolved by the Palestinian Authority. Israel and Egypt then imposed an economic blockade on Gaza and largely sealed their borders with the territory.

After acquiring control of Gaza, Hamas-affiliated and other militias launched rocket attacks upon Israel, which Hamas ceased in June 2008 following an Egyptian-brokered ceasefire. The ceasefire broke down late in 2008, with each side accusing the other of responsibility. In late December 2008, Israel attacked Gaza, withdrawing its forces in mid-January 2009. Since 2009, Hamas has faced multiple military confrontations with Israel, notably the 2012 and 2014 Gaza Wars, leading to substantial casualties. Hamas has maintained control over Gaza, often clashing with the Palestinian Authority led by Fatah. Efforts at reconciliation between Hamas and Fatah have seen limited success. Hamas has continued to face international isolation and blockades, while engaging in sporadic rocket attacks and tunnel construction activities against Israel. In 2023, Hamas launched the October 7 attack on Israel, starting the ongoing Gaza war.

== Family origins outside the Gaza Strip ==
Most of the founding members of Hamas, and most of the current leadership, were born in Mandatory Palestine but outside of the Gaza Strip, or have parents who were.

- Founding leader Ahmed Yassin was born in Al-Jura.
- Yassin's successor Abdel Aziz al-Rantisi was born in Yibna.
- Ismail Haniyeh's was born in Al-Shati refugee camp to parents migrated from Al-Jura to Gaza in 1948.
- The father of Faiq and Mahmoud Al-Mabhouh was from Bayt Tima.
- Yahya Sinwar was born in the Khan Yunis in Egyptian-occupied Gaza in 1962 to a family who left the city of Ashqelon during the 1948 Palestine War.
- The exception is Khaled Mashal, who was born in Silwad, in the Jordanian ruled West Bank.

In 1956, when he was eight or nine, Abdel Aziz al-Rantisi witnessed the Khan Yunis massacre in the Southern Gaza Strip. During the massacre, al-Rantisi recalled that Israeli soldiers killed his uncle in front of him, in conversation with Joe Sacco he claimed this fact was very important for his future life.

Yahya Sinwar was born in 1962, in the Khan Yunis refugee camp, when the Gaza Strip was under Egyptian rule, where he spent his early years. His family were expelled from or fled from Al-Majdal Asqalan (Arabic: مدينة مجدل, romanized: Medīna Majal), now known as Ashkelon, during the 1948 Arab–Israeli War, and sought refuge in the Gaza Strip. Sinwar, discussing his refugee upbringing, tied it to his Hamas involvement in conversations with fellow prisoners during his later imprisonment. According to Esmat Mansour, another inmate, Sinwar was deeply affected by the communal living conditions and food distribution in the refugee camp.

Family origins of Hamas leaders (see text).

== Early Islamic activism in Gaza ==
With its takeover of Gaza after the 1967 war with Egypt, Israel tolerated and at times encouraged Islamic activists and groups as a counterweight to the secular nationalists of the PLO and its dominant faction, Fatah. Israel hunted down secular Palestine Liberation Organization factions, but dropped the previous Egyptian rulers' harsh restrictions against Islamic activists.

Among the activists benefited was Sheikh Ahmed Yassin, leader of the Muslim Brotherhood in Gaza, who had also formed the Islamist group Mujama al-Islamiya, a charity recognized by Israel in 1979. Israel allowed the organization to build mosques, clubs, schools, and a library in Gaza. Yitzhak Segev, the Israeli governor of Gaza in 1979, said he had no illusions about Yassin's intentions, having watched an Islamist movement topple the Shah as Israel's military attache in Iran. However, in conformity with the quietist approach characteristic of the Muslim Brotherhood in Gaza, which unlike many Palestinian factions, did not boycott Israel's occupation of the Strip after 1967, and Yassin and his charity were considered "100% peaceful" towards Israel during this time. Segev maintained regular contact with Yassin, met with him around a dozen times, and arranged for Yassin to be taken to Israel for hospital treatment.

Also, Segev said, Fatah was "our main enemy." Islamists frequently attacked secular and leftist Palestinian movements, including Fatah, but the Israeli military avoided getting involved in those quarrels. It stood aside, for example, when Mujama al-Islamiya activists stormed the Red Crescent charity's headquarters in Gaza, but Segev did send soldiers to prevent the burning down of the home of the head of the organization.

In 1984 the Israeli army received intelligence that Yassin's followers were collecting arms in Gaza. Israeli troops raided mosques and found a cache of weapons. Yassin was arrested, but told his interrogators the weapons were meant to be used against secular Palestinians, not Israel. The cleric was released a year later and allowed to continue to develop his movement in Gaza.

Around the time of Yassin's arrest, Avner Cohen, an Israeli religious affairs official, sent a report to senior military officers and civilian leadership in Gaza advising them of the dangers of the Islamic movement, but this report and similar ones were ignored. Former military intelligence officer Shalom Harari said the warnings were ignored out of neglect, not a desire to fortify the Islamists, and said "Israel never financed Hamas. Israel never armed Hamas." However, former Israeli officials have openly acknowledged Israel's role in providing funding and assistance to Yassin's network as a means of undermining the secular, left-wing Palestinian factions that made up the PLO. Brigadier General Yitzhak Segev, who served as the Israeli military governor in Gaza during the early 1980s, admitted to providing financial assistance to Mujama al-Islamiya, the precursor of Hamas, on the instruction of the Israeli authorities. Former Israeli Civil Administration director Efraim Sneh stated in 1992 that "we saw the fundamentalists mainly as an unthreatening social force aiming to improve the bad conditions and standards of living of the Palestinians ... We know now that we must make a distinction between Hamas, with whom we have nothing in common, and the moderates, mainstream secular elements among the Palestinians." In 2018, historian Uri Milstein quoted Yitzhak Mordechai, who served as head of the Southern Command from 1986 to 1989, as saying that "I was very familiar with Gaza from my previous positions. But when I took charge of the Southern Command, I was shocked by the number of mosques that had been recently constructed in Gaza. As it turned out, Israel's strategists had been supportive of Sheikh Ahmed Yassin's charitable organization."

== The founding of Hamas ==
Hasan and Sayedahmed (2018) cite multiple sources that say that Hamas was founded in the late 1970s as a religious counterweight to the secular Fatah. Other sources say that Hamas was founded by Yassin and six other Palestinians as an offshoot of Egypt's Muslim Brotherhood after Palestinians were killed in a traffic accident involving an Israeli driver during the events that followed–First Intifada, a Palestinian uprising against Israel's occupation of the West Bank and Gaza. The new group was supported by Brotherhood-affiliated charities and social institutions that had already gained a strong foothold in the occupied territories. The acronym "Hamas" first appeared in 1987 in a leaflet that accused the Israeli intelligence services of undermining the moral fiber of Palestinian youth as part of Mossad's recruitment of what Hamas termed "collaborators." Nonetheless, Israeli military and intelligence was still focused on Fatah, and continued to maintain contacts with Gaza Islamic activists. Numerous Islamist leaders, including senior Hamas founder Mahmoud Zahar, met with Yitzhak Rabin as part of "regular consultations" between Israeli officials and Palestinians not linked to the PLO.

Mary Elizabeth King (2009) wrote that the nonviolence of the First Intifada "neither lifted the military occupation nor stopped the implanting of Israeli settlements in lands set aside for the Palestinians by the United Nations. Nevertheless, the uprising's nonviolent sanctions achieved more than had decades of armed attacks on largely civilian targets. ... Israeli agents provocateurs in Arab disguise ... joined demonstrations and sought to incite demonstrators to use violence. The local committee [organizing the nonviolent demonstrations] prevented such provocations from instigating lethal escalations." The First Intifada disintegrated "into violence after Israel's incarceration, deportation, or discrediting of the very activist intellectuals who had sustained the uprising's nonviolent character".

Hamas carried out its first attack against Israel in 1989, abducting and killing two soldiers. The Israel Defense Forces immediately arrested Yassin and sentenced him to life in prison, and deported 400 Hamas activists, including Zahar, to South Lebanon, which at the time was occupied by Israel. During this time Hamas built a relationship with Hezbollah.

From 1987 to 1991, Hamas campaigned for the wearing of the hijab alongside other measures, including insisting women stay at home, be segregated from men, and the promotion of polygamy. In the course of this campaign women who chose not to wear the hijab were verbally and physically harassed, with the result that the hijab was being worn 'just to avoid problems on the streets'.

Hamas subsequently opposed the 1993 Oslo Accords, and refused to take part in the newly-formed Palestinian Authority. In the short-term, this opposition lead to a decrease in Hamas's popularity, as Palestinians inside the occupied territories broadly welcomed the Accords. In the long-term, however, according to Palestinian sociologist Jamil Hilal, Hamas "presented itself as the main opposition to the Oslo Accords and succeeded in becoming a major political (and armed) force with the failure of the Oslo Accords to lead to a sovereign Palestinian State with East Jerusalem as its capital."

== The 1990s ==
Hamas denounced negotiations between Israel and PLO and started using violence to counter this process. Hamas's military branch, the Izz ad-Din al-Qassam Brigades, was created in 1991. The Brigades' objectives are subordinate to the political goals of Hamas, however, they operate with a significant degree of independence. Hamas killed an Israeli border guard in December 1992.

Hamas first began specifically targeting civilians in suicide attacks in response to the Cave of the Patriarchs massacre carried out by the American-Israeli settler Baruch Goldstein, who on 25 February 1994, during Ramadan, killed 29 unarmed civilians and injured 125 by throwing hand grenades and firing at a group of worshippers during prayer at the Ibrahimi Mosque in Hebron. Before that, Hamas did not deliberately attack civilian targets. Following the massacre, Hamas announced that if Israel did not discriminate between "fighters and unarmed civilians", then it would be "forced ... to treat the Zionists in the same manner. Treating like with like is a universal principle." Hamas became well known internationally for their suicide attacks.

Yahya Ayyash, the leader of the West Bank battalion of the Brigades and believed to be the mastermind behind most of the early suicide attacks, was killed by the Israeli secret service in early 1996.

In December 1992, Israel responded to the killing of a border police officer by deporting 415 leading figures of Hamas and Islamic Jihad to Lebanon, which provoked international condemnation and a unanimous UN Security Council resolution, number 799, condemning the action and demanding the return of those deported. Those expelled had their identification papers confiscated and were bussed through the Israeli security zone in southern Lebanon, and released at the Zamraya crossing. Each deportee was given $50. On their arrival, the Lebanese authorities refused to allow them any further into Lebanon and they set up camp on the mountainside at Marj al Zuhur. Amongst those deported were around 100 sheikhs, imams, muezzins, qadi and other religious figures. 170 had university degrees or equivalent diplomas. Israel admitted seventeen, including a sixteen-year-old, had been deported by mistake. On 9 September 1993, coinciding with the Oslo agreement, 181 of the remaining 396 deportees were returned to the Gaza Strip where the majority were immediately detained by the Israeli authorities. The remaining 197 deportees returned to the Occupied Territories on 4 December 1993, 29 were immediately taken into custody and 18 did not return.

Although the suicide attacks by the al-Qassam Brigades and other groups violated the 1993 Oslo accords (which Hamas opposed), Palestinian Authority President Yasir Arafat was reluctant to pursue the attackers and may have had inadequate means to do so. Some analysts stated that the Palestinian Authority could stop the suicide and other attacks on civilians but refused to do so.

In September 1997, Israeli agents in Jordan attempted but failed to kill Hamas leader Khaled Mashal. In a bid to release Mossad agents captured by the Jordanian authority after the failed assassination attempt, King Hussein secured a deal with Israel to swap Yassin with Mossad agents. Two years later Hamas was banned in Jordan, reportedly in part at the request of the United States, Israel, and the Palestinian Authority. Jordan's King Abdullah feared the activities of Hamas and its Jordanian allies would jeopardize peace negotiations with Israel, and accused Hamas of engaging in illegitimate activities within Jordan. In mid-September 1999, authorities arrested Hamas leaders Khaled Mashal and Ibrahim Ghosheh on their return from a visit to Iran, and charged them with being members of an illegal organization, storing weapons, conducting military exercises, and using Jordan as a training base. Hamas leaders denied the charges. Mashal was exiled and eventually settled in Syria.

== The Second Intifada ==
Al-Qassam Brigades militants were among the armed groups that launched both military-style attacks and suicide bombings against Israeli civilian and military targets during the Second Intifada, also known as the Al-Aqsa Intifada (Arabic: انتفاضة الأقصى, Intifāḍat El Aqṣa; Hebrew: אינתיפאדת אל-אקצה, Intifādat El-Aqtzah), which began in late September 2000. This Palestinian uprising against Israeli rule in the occupied territories was much more violent than the First Intifada. The military and civilian death toll was estimated at 5,500 Palestinians, more than 1,100 Israelis, and 64 foreigners. A 2007 study of Palestinian suicide bombings during the Second Intifada (September 2000 through August 2005) found that about 40 percent were carried out by the al-Qassam Brigades.

The immediate trigger for the Second Intifada is disputed, but a more general cause, writes U.S. political science professor Jeremy Pressman, was "popular Palestinian discontent [that] grew during the Oslo peace process because the reality on the ground did not match the expectations created by the peace agreements." Hamas would be the beneficiary of this growing discontent in the 2006 Palestinian Authority legislative elections.

Since 2002, militants of al-Qassam Brigades and other groups have used homemade Qassam rockets to hit Israeli towns in the Negev, such as Sderot. Al-Qassam Brigades was estimated in 2007 to have launched 22% of the rocket and mortar attacks, which killed fifteen people between the years 2000 and 2009. The introduction of the Qassam-2 rocket in 2008 enabled Palestinian paramilitary groups to reach, from Gaza, such Israeli cities such as Ashkelon.

== 2004 – Negotiation Attempts ==
In January 2004, Hamas leader Yassin said that the group would end armed resistance against Israel in exchange for a Palestinian state in the West Bank, including East Jerusalem, and the Gaza Strip, and that restoring Palestinians' "historical rights" (relating to the 1948 Palestinian expulsion and flight) "would be left for future generations." On 25 January 2004, senior Hamas official Abdel Aziz al-Rantissi offered a 10-year truce, or hudna, in return for the establishment of a Palestinian state and the complete withdrawal by Israel from the territories captured in the 1967 Six-Day War. Al-Rantissi stated that Hamas had come to the conclusion that it was "difficult to liberate all our land at this stage, so we accept a phased liberation." Israel immediately dismissed al-Rantissi's statements as insincere and a smokescreen for military preparations. Yassin was killed in a targeted killing on 22 March 2004, by an Israeli air strike, and al-Rantisi was killed by a similar air strike on 18 April 2004.

From the time of an attack on the Israeli southern town of Be'er Sheva in August 2004, in which 15 people were killed and 125 wounded, a truce was generally observed. Hamas violated it in August 2005, with an attack on the same bus station, wounding seven, and in several attacks on Israeli motorists—killing six.

At the end of January 2004, U.S. Secretary of State Colin Powell mandated Steve Cohen, a U.S. official, to meet with Hamas officials, according to the French newspaper Le Canard enchaîné. The mission was not only to inform the U.S. about the Hamas objectives, according to the newspaper, but also to evaluate if it could represent a counterbalance to al-Qaeda. In exchange for such cooperation, according to Le Canard, Hamas officials asked for the end of extrajudicial targeted killings carried out against them by the Israeli military.

While Hamas boycotted the 2005 Palestinian presidential election, it did participate in the 2005 municipal elections organized by Yasser Arafat in the occupied territories. In those elections it won control of over one third of Palestinian municipal councils, besting Fatah, which had traditionally been "the biggest force in Palestinian politics". With this electoral success behind it, Hamas contested the 2006 elections for the Palestinian Legislative Council as the main component of the List of Change and Reform.

== 2005 – Israel's unilateral disengagement plan ==
In 2004, in a prelude to Israel's unilateral disengagement plan from the Gaza Strip, Israeli forces carried out a number of military attacks targeted at militants in Gaza cities and refugees camps, seeking to draw out and kill Hamas-affiliated gunmen. Awareness of high casualties during such incursions led the Hamas leadership to instruct its activists to avoid putting themselves needlessly in the line of fire. On 12 September 2005, IDF withdrew from the Gaza Strip and declared an official end to Israeli military rule in Gaza, though Israel still retained control of the airspace and of the sea. However, the Palestinian Authority argued that the occupation was ongoing, as complete sovereignty includes control of both airspace and seaways. The Gaza Strip was called a "lawless open-air prison".

Hamas claimed that this unilateral withdrawal was a victory for its armed struggle and pledged to liberate all the occupied territories, including the West Bank and East Jerusalem. Fatah, on the other hand, viewed Ariel Sharon's unilateral plan as proof of the Palestinians' failure to obtain international recognition. Both criticized the disengagement plan, citing Sharon's simultaneous encouragement of Israeli settlements in the West Bank, including Ma'ale Adumim, a large settlement east of Jerusalem.

In April 2005, an advisor of Benjamin Netanyahu, a principal right-wing opponent of Ariel Sharon, secretly negotiated with a Hamas representative, according to the Le Canard enchaîné. The meeting was about the "possibility of an administrative co-gestion with the Hamas in the occupied territories", which is already the case in some Hamas-controlled cities of the West Bank, according to the French newspaper, which continued: "But, in both sides, participants to such a dialogue keeps their mouth shut (bouche cousue). It is impossible to admit that one has met and negotiated with his sworn enemy."

== January 2006 – Winning the legislative election ==
While Hamas had boycotted the January 2005 presidential election, during which Mahmoud Abbas was elected to replace Yasser Arafat, it did participate in the municipal elections held between January and May 2005, in which it took control of Beit Lahia and Rafah in the Gaza Strip and Qalqilyah in the West Bank. The January 2006 legislative elections marked another victory for Hamas, which gained the majority of seats, defeating the ruling Fatah party. The "List of Change and Reform", as Hamas presented itself, obtained 42.9% of the vote and 74 of the 132 seats.

=== Political decisions, and consequences on economy ===
The result of the election was regarded as a major setback for governments attempting to mediate the ongoing Israeli–Palestinian conflict. The George W. Bush administration immediately declared that it would not deal with Hamas until it renounced its support of suicide bombings and violence, and accepted Israel's right to exist. Israeli president Moshe Katsav and Israel's ex–prime minister Shimon Peres both said that if Hamas would accept Israel's right to exist and give up violence, Israel should negotiate with the organization. President Vladimir Putin said that Russia would not support any efforts to cut off financial assistance to the Palestinians, stating that Hamas gained power by democratic means. He invited some Hamas leaders to Moscow beginning of March 2006, and in May, repeated that cutting funds to the Hamas was a "mistake".

The US and the EU cut all funds to the Palestinian Authority, with only Russia warning against the potential dangers of cutting out the PA from any Western support. The EU (which gives $500 million per year to the PA) announced that future aid to the Palestinians was tied to "Three Principles" outlined by the international community—Hamas must renounce violence, it must recognize Israel's right to exist, and it must express clear support for the Middle East peace process, as outlined in the 1993 Oslo Accords. Hamas did not seem to be ready to accept such conditions, and rejected them as "unfair". At best, they would be ready to accept the Arab Peace Initiative formulated on 28 March 2002, during the Arab League Beirut Summit: full normalization of relations with Israel in exchange for Israeli withdrawal to the 1967 internationally recognized borders, implying Israeli evacuation of the West Bank, the Gaza Strip, east Jerusalem, the Golan Heights and the return of all Palestinian refugees and their descendants. Furthermore, the US has imposed a financial blockade on the PA's banks, impeding some of the Arab League's funds (e.g. Saudi Arabia and Qatar) from being transferred to the PA.

Israel, on the other side, decided to cut transfers of the $55 million tax-receipts of the PA that it receives on the PA's behalf, since the PA did not have any access point to receive taxes. On 19 February 2006, interim Israeli Prime minister Ehud Olmert, who called the PA a "terrorist authority", decided to stop transfer of the $55 million tax-receipts to the PA, which accounts for a third of the PA's budget (two thirds of its proper budget) and insure the wages of 165,000 Palestinian civil servants (among them 60,000 security and police officers). Israel had already done that in 1991 and 1992, but international aid had covered up the budgetary losses. Israel also decided to increase controls on check-points, but finally decided against blocking Palestinians from commuting between Gaza and the West Bank and from prohibiting them to work in Israel. Criticizing these measures, moderate Labor leader Amir Peretz said that they were "indirect ways" to "get around Hamas and strengthen moderate forces" among the Palestinians.

In May 2006, following a World Bank report about the Palestinian economy, the Quartet on the Middle East (the United States, Russia, European Union, and the United Nations) agreed to transfer funds directly to the Palestinian population. Israeli minister of foreign affairs, Tzipi Livni, said the measure was "acceptable", while PA minister of foreign affairs, Mahmoud Zahar, welcomed the promise of aid but criticised attempts to bypass the PA: "We appreciate every effort in order to help the Palestinian people by legal channels... and the legal channel is the Palestinian Authority, whether the presidency or the government,".

The World Bank had already compared the 2001 and 2002 economic recession, due to the Second Intifada and Israel's refusal to transfer tax receipts, to the 1929 economic crisis. The UN underlined that unemployment, which was estimated to 23% in 2005, would increase to 39% in 2006, while poverty, estimated at 44%, would increase to 67% in 2006. According to a World Bank report published on 7 May 2006, the delay in paying the PA's civil servants—who had not received their wages since March 2006—was dangerous both on social and security plans. This convinced the United States to accept the EU proposal, supported by Russia and the Arab countries, of finding a way to transfer funds to the Palestinian society without passing by the Palestinian Authority. The Quartet on the Middle East thus accepted, on 9 May 2006, an "international temporary mechanism of limited range and length"

=== Last Fatah measures ===
Before the Israeli decision to cut transfer of tax receipts, the Palestinian Assembly passed legislation giving the Palestinian President, Mahmoud Abbas, the power to appoint a court that could veto legislation passed by the new Hamas-led parliament to be sworn in start of February. The constitutional court would veto legislation deemed in violation of the Palestinians' Basic Law, a forerunner to the Palestinian constitution. Palestinian deputies also backed a decree that automatically makes members of the incoming parliament members of the Palestine Liberation Organization's (PLO) parliament in exile. Unlike the Hamas charter, the PLO charter recognises the legitimacy of Israel.

=== Hamas' declarations since the 2006 legislative elections ===
Hamas dropped its call for the destruction of Israel from its 2006 election manifesto, calling instead for "the establishment of an independent state whose capital is Jerusalem" and top Hamas official Mahmoud al-Zahar told CNN and claimed that 'long-term truce' with Israel is possible if Israel withdraws to pre-1967 borders and releases Palestinian prisoners.

On 8 February 2006, Hamas head Khaled Mashal speaking in Cairo said that he wanted to send a message to the Israeli government that Hamas would be ready to talk if Israel met conditions that included a withdrawal to the 1967 boundaries, Hamas would then "possibly give a long-term truce with Israel". However, he also asserted that "We will not stand against the resistance, we will not condemn any operation and will never arrest any mujahed [holy warrior], Anyone who thinks Hamas will change is wrong" and refused to commit the organization to a full renunciation of violence..

However, on 13 February 2006, in an interview in Russian newspaper Nezavisimaya Gazeta, the same Khaled Mashal declared that Hamas would stop armed struggle against Israel if it recognized the 1967 borders, withdrew itself from all Palestinian occupied territories (including the West Bank and East Jerusalem), and recognized Palestinian rights that would include the "right of return". This was the first time that Hamas even talked about an eventual stop to armed struggle. But Mashal continued to refuse to acknowledge the Road map for peace, adopted by the Quartet in June 2003, "since nobody respects it". The Road map projected the establishment of an independent Palestinian state in 2005. The Palestinian Authority's Al-Hayat Al-Jadeeda conducted a poll in 2006 that showed that 84% of Palestinians support a peace deal with Israel, based on the responses of "863 Palestinians from the Gaza Strip and West Bank," and that more than 75% of the peace-deal supporters voted for Hamas.

In April 2006, Henry Siegman, former director of the American Jewish Committee, stated that according to "a prominent senior member of Hamas's Political Committee" Hamas is prepared to explicitly recognize the state of Israel. "Members of Hamas's political directorate do not preclude significant changes over time in their policies toward Israel and in their founding charter, including recognition of Israel, and even mutual minor border adjustments. Such changes depend on Israel's recognition of Palestinian rights. Hamas will settle for nothing less than full reciprocity." These sentiments "are in striking contrast to the odiousness of Hamas's founding charter," said Siegman.

In May 2006, The Jerusalem Post reported that Hamas leaders threatened a new Intifada, as well as to decapitate anyone who tried to bring down their cabinet.

=== Cabinet formation ===
On 20 March 2006, Hamas unveiled its full cabinet list, placing loyal members in charge of all key ministries; of the 24 ministers appointed, the majority were Hamas (the others were independent or technocrats). Mahmoud Abbas' Fatah refused to join the Hamas government. The position of foreign minister was given to Mahmoud al-Zahar, a Gazan leader and target of previous targeted killing attempts by Israel. Saeed Seyam, another Hamas leader, was appointed interior minister, in charge of multiple security agencies. Hamas member and engineer Ala el-Deen Al-Araj was appointed economics minister. The position of finance minister was given to Omar Abdel-Razeq, Hamas election official and economics professor from the West Bank.

In his interview to The Sunday Telegraph, the newly appointed chief of the Palestinian security services Jamal Abu Samhadana stated: "We have only one enemy. They are Jews. We have no other enemy. I will continue to carry the rifle and pull the trigger whenever required to defend my people." However, president Mahmoud Abbas retained official control over the Palestinian security services.

=== Tensions between Fatah and Hamas ===
After the formation of the Hamas cabinet on 20 March 2006, tensions progressively rose in the Gaza Strip between Fatah and Hamas militants. In May 2006, The Sunday Times reported that Israeli security sources claimed they had uncovered a Hamas plot to assassinate president Mahmoud Abbas. This was officially denied by a Hamas spokesman, while Mahmoud Abbas' spokesman, Nabil Abu Rudeina, described the report as "totally untrue". On 8 May, three Palestinians were killed and 10 wounded in clashes in southern Gaza, near Khan Yunis, between rival Hamas and Fatah gunmen. On 6 and 7 May, hundreds of Palestinians demonstrated in Gaza and the West Bank demanding payment of their wages. Although this inter-Palestinian incident had been one of the most serious since January 2006, tension had been slowly risen with the "economic squeeze" on the PA.

=== Agreement and preservation of national unity ===
On 27 June, Hamas and Fatah reached an agreement on the prisoners' document, which included the forming of a national unity government.

In February 2007 Saudi-sponsored negotiations in Mecca produced agreement on a signed by Mahmoud Abbas on behalf of Fatah and Khaled Mashal on behalf of Hamas. The new government was called on to achieve Palestinian national goals as approved by the Palestine National Council, the clauses of the Basic Law and the National Reconciliation Document (the "Prisoners' Document") as well as the decisions of the Arab summit.

In March 2007, the Palestinian Legislative Council established a national unity government, with 83 representatives voting in favor and three against. Government ministers were sworn in by Mahmoud Abbas, the chairman on the Palestinian Authority, in at a ceremony held simultaneously in Gaza and Ramallah. In June that year, Hamas took control of the Gaza Strip from the national unity government after forcing out Fatah.

=== 2006 Gaza–Israel conflict ===
On 9 June, during or shortly after an Israeli operation, an explosion occurred on a busy Gaza beach, killing eight Palestinian civilians. It was initially assumed that Israeli shellings were responsible for the killings, although Israeli government officials later denied this. Prompted by the recent events Hamas formally withdrew from its 16-month ceasefire on 10 June, and took responsibility for the ongoing Qassam rocket attacks being launched from Gaza into Israel.

On 24 June, Israeli operatives apprehended Osama and Mustafa Muamar in the Gaza Strip, alleged by Israel to be Hamas members. On 25 June, a Hamas attack in Israel resulted in the deaths of two Israeli soldiers and the capture of Israeli Corporal Gilad Shalit. Israel then launched Operation Summer Rains on 28 June to recover the captured soldier. The ongoing operation initially consisted of heavy bombardment of bridges, roads, and the only power station in Gaza. Several PA facilities were also bombed, such as the Palestinian Interior Ministry and the office of the Palestinian Prime Minister Ismail Haniyeh.

On 29 June, Israel captured 64 Hamas officials. Amongst them were eight Palestinian Authority cabinet ministers and up to twenty members of the Palestinian Legislative Council, as well as heads of regional councils, and the mayor of Qalqilyah and his deputy. At least a third of the Hamas cabinet was captured and held by Israel. On 6 August Israeli forces detained the Hamas' Speaker of the Palestinian Legislative Council, Aziz Dweik, at his home in the West Bank.

In November 2006, a 64-year-old woman executed a suicide bombing mission, killing herself and slightly injuring 2 Israeli soldiers. Hamas claimed responsibility and its spokesman, Abu Obaida, declared that "both Palestinian men and women are committed to battling the Israelis".

=== 2007 – End-of-truce with Israel ===
On 24 April 2007, "six rockets were launched from Gaza [by Hamas], two of which landed in Israel". According to Bloomberg news, Palestinians said the rockets were in response to Israeli military action over the previous weekend which had "killed as many as eight people in the West Bank, where there is no cease-fire, and one in Gaza." Most of the dead were militants, but Palestinians said at least two civilians, including a 17-year-old girl, were killed. Hamas announced that it considered the truce to be over.

The rocket attack, which came on Israel's 59th Independence Day, caused no damage or injury. However, it marked the first time Hamas openly acknowledged firing shells toward Israel since agreeing to a cease-fire along the Gaza-Israel border in November.

Abu Ubeida, a spokesman for Hamas' armed wing, told foreign journalists that "there is no truce between us and the occupation, the occupation destroyed the truce from the moment it started, we did not trust the intentions of the occupation from the beginning." Abu Ubeida told the Voice of Palestine radio station that "the cease-fire has been over for a long time, and Israel is responsible for that." "This is a message to the Zionist enemy that our strikes will continue," Abu Obeida said of the rocket fire. "We are ready to kidnap more and more, and kill more and more of your soldiers."

Israeli soldier Cpl. Gilad Shalit's kidnappers demand the release of hundreds of Palestinian prisoners, including veterans and those involved in killing or wounding Israelis.

Israeli Prime Minister Ehud Olmert said on 23 April 2007, that freeing soldiers is important to the government, but that it would not repeat "mistakes made in the past" by releasing violent prisoners who then carried out more attacks against Israelis. But Olmert said there would be "no escape in the end from making a difficult decision" on trading prisoners for the captured Israeli troops.

Hamas militants stated on 24 April 2007, that they had launched 40 rockets and 70 mortar shells. The Israeli military said it could confirm six rockets and eight mortars. Two of the rockets fell in Israel, north of the Gaza Strip, the Israeli army said–they added that the attack was a diversion for an attempt by Hamas gunmen to kidnap an IDF soldier.

In May 2006, Israel arrested a top Hamas official, Ibrahim Hamed, who Israeli security officials alleged was responsible for dozens of suicide bombings and other attacks on Israelis. Hamed's trial on those charges has not yet concluded. In 2008, Hamas explosives engineer Shihab al-Natsheh organized a deadly suicide bombing in Dimona.

== Hamas–Fatah conflict ==
After the formation of the Hamas-led cabinet on 20 March 2006, tensions between Fatah and Hamas militants progressively rose in the Gaza strip, leading to demonstrations, violence, and repeated attempts at a truce. Israeli intelligence warned Mahmoud Abbas that Hamas had planned to kill him at his office in Gaza. According to a Palestinian source close to Abbas, Hamas considers President Abbas to be a barrier to its complete control over Palestine and decided to kill him. In a statement to Al Jazeera, Hamas leader Mohammed Nazzal accused Abbas of being party to besieging and isolating the Hamas-led government.

On 9 June 2006, during an Israeli artillery operation, an explosion occurred on a busy Gaza beach, killing eight Palestinian civilians. It was assumed that Israeli shellings were responsible for the killings, but Israeli government officials denied this. Hamas formally withdrew from its 16-month ceasefire on 10 June, taking responsibility for the subsequent Qassam rocket attacks launched from Gaza into Israel.

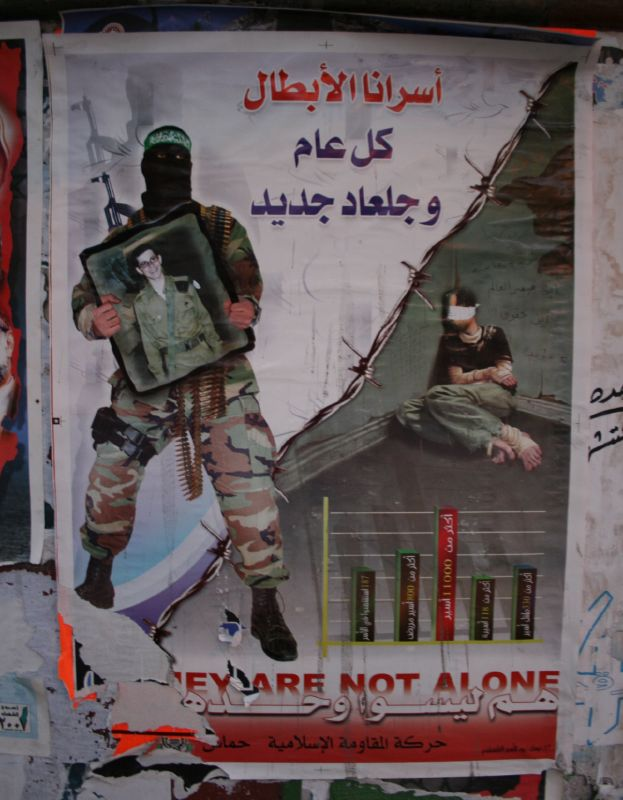
Hostage Israeli soldier Gilad Shalit on Hamas poster, reads: "Our heroes prisoners may we have a new Gilad each year" and down :"They (Palestinian prisoners) are not alone"

On 29 June, following a joint incursion by Fatah, Islamic Jihad, and Hamas in which two Israeli soldiers were killed and corporal Gilad Shalit was captured, Israel captured 64 Hamas officials. Among them were 8 Palestinian Authority cabinet ministers and up to 20 members of the Palestinian Legislative Council, as well as heads of regional councils, and the mayor of Qalqilyah and his deputy. At least a third of the Hamas cabinet was captured and held by Israel. On 6 August Israeli forces detained the Speaker of the Palestinian Legislative Council, Hamas member Aziz Dweik, at his home in the West Bank.

These arrests, along with other events, including the subsequent arrest of the speaker of the Palestinian Legislative Council, effectively prevented the Hamas-dominated legislature that resulted from the preceding elections from functioning during most of its term.

In February 2007, Saudi-sponsored negotiations in Mecca produced agreement on a signed by Mahmoud Abbas on behalf of Fatah and Khaled Mashal on behalf of Hamas. The new government was called on to achieve Palestinian national goals as approved by the Palestine National Council, the clauses of the Basic Law and the National Reconciliation Document (the "Prisoners' Document") as well as the decisions of the Arab summit.

In March 2007, the Palestinian Legislative Council established a national unity government, with 83 representatives voting in favor and three against. Government ministers were sworn in by Mahmoud Abbas, the chairman on the Palestinian Authority, in at a ceremony held simultaneously in Gaza and Ramallah. In June that year, Hamas took control of the Gaza Strip from the national unity government after forcing out Fatah.

In June 2007, renewed fighting broke out between Hamas and Fatah. In the course of the June 2007 Battle of Gaza, Hamas exploited the near total collapse of Palestinian Authority forces in Gaza, to take over control of Gaza, ousting Fatah officials. President Mahmoud Abbas then dismissed the Hamas-led Palestinian Authority government. and outlawed the Hamas militia.

Immediately upon the conclusion of the Battle of Gaza, Israel imposed an economic blockade on Gaza, and Hamas repeatedly launched rocket attacks upon areas of Israel near its border with Gaza because of the blockade.

At least 600 Palestinians died in fighting between Hamas and Fatah. Human Rights Watch, a U.S.-based group, accused both sides in the conflict of torture and war crimes.

=== Gaza War ===
On 17 June 2008, Egyptian mediators announced that an informal truce had been agreed to between Hamas and Israel. Hamas agreed to cease rocket attacks on Israel, while Israel agreed to allow limited commercial shipping across its border with Gaza, barring any breakdown of the tentative peace deal; Hamas also hinted that it would discuss the release of Gilad Shalit. Israeli sources state that Hamas also committed itself to enforce the ceasefire on the other Palestinian organizations.

While Hamas was careful to maintain the ceasefire, the lull was sporadically violated by other groups, sometimes in defiance of Hamas. For example, on 24 June Islamic Jihad launched rockets at the Israeli town of Sderot; Israel called the attack a grave violation of the informal truce, and closed its border crossings with Gaza.

On 4 November 2008, Israeli forces, stating they were attempting to stop construction of a tunnel, killed six Hamas gunmen in a raid inside the Gaza Strip. Hamas responded with increased rocket attacks, a total of 190 rockets in November according to Israel's military, up from two in each of the preceding months.

With the six-month truce officially expired on 19 December, Hamas launched 50 to more than 70 rockets and mortars into Israel over the next three days, though no Israelis were injured. On 21 December, Hamas said it was ready to stop the attacks and renew the truce if Israel stopped its "aggression" in Gaza and opened up its border crossings. The previous six weeks had seen a "dramatic increase" in attacks from Hamas.

On 27 and 28 December, the Operation Cast Lead attack on Gaza was launched, killing over 280 and injuring 600 in its first two days, according to Palestinian officials. Most were Hamas police and security officers, though many civilians also died. According to Israel, militant training camps, rocket-manufacturing facilities and weapons warehouses that had been pre-identified were hit, and later they attacked rocket and mortar squads who fired around 180 rockets and mortars at Israeli communities. Chief of Gaza police force Tawfiq Jabber, head of the General Security Service Salah Abu Shrakh, senior religious authority and security officer Nizar Rayyan, and Interior Minister Said Seyam were among those killed during the fighting. Although Israel sent out thousands of cell-phone messages urging residents of Gaza to leave houses where weapons may be stored, in an attempt to minimise civilian casualties, some residents complained there was nowhere to go because many neighborhoods had received the same message. Israeli bombs landed close to civilian structures such as schools. Israel said they had only targeted sites from which they had been attacked, and some local civilians also said that there had been attacks against Israel from just outside the school. Some alleged that Israel was deliberately targeting Palestinian civilians.

Israel declared a unilateral ceasefire on 17 January 2009. Hamas responded the following day by announcing a one-week ceasefire to give Israel time to withdraw its forces from the Gaza Strip. Between 1,166 and 1,400 Palestinians and 13 Israelis were killed in the conflict.

=== After the Gaza War ===
On 16 August 2009, Hamas leader Khaled Mashal stated that the organization was ready to open dialogue with the Obama administration because its policies were much better than those of former US president George W. Bush: "As long as there's a new language, we welcome it, but we want to see not only a change of language, but also a change of policies on the ground. We have said that we are prepared to cooperate with the US or any other international party that would enable the Palestinians to get rid of occupation." Despite this, an 30 August 2009, speech during a visit to Jordan in which Mashal expressed support for the Palestinian right of return was interpreted by David Pollock of the Washington Institute for Near East Policy as a sign that "Hamas has now clearly opted out of diplomacy." However, in a rare and widely cited video interview with Charlie Rose on 28 May 2010, Mashal expressed his view that a right of return (to a Palestinian state outside Israel's 1967 boundaries) was consistent with diplomacy toward a two-state solution, saying that "if Israel withdraws to the borders of 1967, it doesn't mean that it gives us back all the land of the Palestinians. But we do consider this as an acceptable solution to have a Palestinian state on the borders of 1967. Hamas accepts a Palestinian state on the borders of 1967 with its capital Jerusalem and with the right of return. This stand by Hamas is announced, practiced, and it signed an agreement with Fatah, which is the national compact document."

The 2 August 2010 rocket attack on Eilat and Aqaba sparked rage in Egypt at Hamas and Iran. The Egyptian press stated that the firing of the rockets from Egyptian territory by Hamas or by organizations cooperating with it constituted the crossing of a red line. The Egyptian position was that Iran is using Hamas as a local proxy to escalate violence in the Middle East and to sabotage the Palestinian reconciliation efforts, as well as efforts to renew Palestinian-Israeli peace negotiations.

In February 2010, Palestinian Authority security forces in the West Bank arrested a Hamas cell preparing to test-fire a Qassam rocket near Ramallah and handed the rocket over to Israel. Hamas later stated that "Having a Qassam rocket in the West Bank is a demand that must be achieved".

In 2010, Hamas, who have been actively sidelined from the peace talks by Israel, spearheaded a coordinated effort by 13 Palestinian militant groups, in attempt to derail the stalled peace talks between Israel and Mahmoud Abbas, President of the Palestinian Authority. According to the Israeli Coordinator of Government Activities in the Territories Major Gen. Eitan Dangot, Israel seeks to work with Salam Fayyad, to help revive the Palestinian economy, and hopes to ease restrictions on the Gaza Strip further, "while somehow preventing the Islamic militants who rule it from getting credit for any progress". According to Dangot, Hamas must not be seen as ruling successfully or be allowed to "get credit for a policy that would improve the lives of people". The campaign consists of attacks against Israelis in which, according to a Hamas declaration in early September, "all options are open". The participating groups also include Palestinian Islamic Jihad, the Popular Resistance Committees and an unnamed splinter group of Fatah.

As part of the campaign, on 31 August 2010, 4 Israeli settlers, including a pregnant woman, were killed by Hamas militants while driving on Route 60 near the settlement Kiryat Arba, in the West bank. According to witnesses, militants opened fire on the moving vehicle, but then "approached the car" and shot the occupants in their seats at "close range". The attack was described by Israeli sources as one of the "worst" terrorist acts in years. A senior Hamas official said that Israeli settlers in the West Bank are legitimate targets since "they are an army in every sense of the word".

On 20 June 2010, senior Hamas official Mahmoud a-Zahar called on Palestinian residents of the West Bank to fire rockets into Israel.

=== Islamization of the Gaza Strip (2007–present) ===
Since Hamas took control of the Gaza Strip in 2007, some of its members have attempted to impose Islamic dress or the Hijab head covering on women. Also, the government's "Islamic Endowment Ministry" has deployed Virtue Committee members to warn citizens of the dangers of immodest dress, card playing and dating. However, there are no government laws imposing dress and other moral standards, and the Hamas education ministry reversed one effort to impose Islamic dress on students. There has also been successful resistance to attempts by local Hamas officials to impose Islamic dress on women.

According to Human Rights Watch, the Hamas-controlled government of Gaza stepped up its efforts to "Islamize" Gaza in 2010, efforts that included, according to the organization, the "repression of civil society" and "severe violations of personal freedom."

Palestinian researcher Dr. Khaled Al-Hroub has criticized what he called the "Taliban-like steps" Hamas has taken. He wrote, "The Islamization that has been forced upon the Gaza Strip–the suppression of social, cultural, and press freedoms that do not suit Hamas's view[s]–is an egregious deed that must be opposed. It is the reenactment, under a religious guise, of the experience of [other] totalitarian regimes and dictatorships."

Hamas officials denied having any plans to impose Islamic law, one legislator stating that "What you are seeing are incidents, not policy," and that Islamic law is the desired standard "but we believe in persuasion." The Hamas education ministry reversed one effort to impose Islamic dress on students.

=== 2011–2013 Sinai insurgency ===
Hamas has been accused of providing weapons, training and fighters for Sinai-based insurgent attacks, although Hamas strongly denies the allegations, calling them a smear campaign aiming to harm relations with Egypt. According to the Egyptian Army, since the ouster of Egypt's Muslim-Brotherhood president Mohamed Morsi, over 600 Hamas members have entered the Sinai Peninsula through smuggling tunnels. In addition, several weapons used in Sinai's insurgent attacks are being traced back to Hamas in the Gaza Strip, according to the army. The four leading insurgent groups in the Sinai have all reportedly maintained close ties with the Gaza Strip. Hamas called the accusation a "dangerous development". Egyptian authorities stated that the 2011 Alexandria bombing was carried out by the Gaza-based Army of Islam, which has received sanctuary from Hamas and earlier collaborated in the capture of Gilad Shalit. Army of Islam members linked to the August 2012 Sinai attack have reportedly sought refuge in the Gaza Strip. Egypt stated that Hamas directly provided logistical support to the Muslim Brotherhood militants who carried out the December 2013 Mansoura bombing.

=== Operation Brother's Keeper ===
On 15 June 2014, Israeli Prime Minister Benjamin Netanyahu accused Hamas of involvement in the kidnapping of three Israeli teenagers (including one who held American citizenship), saying "This has severe repercussions." On 5 August 2014, Israel announced that Israeli security forces arrested Hussam Kawasme, in Shuafat, in connection with the murders of the teens. During interrogation, Kawasme admitted to being the mastermind behind the attack, in addition to securing the funding from Hamas. Officials have stated that additional people arrested in connection with the murders are still being held, but no names have been released.

On 20 August, Saleh al-Arouri, a Hamas leader then in exile in Turkey, claimed responsibility for the kidnapping of the three Israeli teens. He delivered an address on behalf of Khaled Mashal at the conference of the International Union of Muslim Scholars in Istanbul, a move that might reflect a desire by Hamas to gain leverage.

Hamas political leader Khaled Mashal accepted that members of Hamas were responsible, stating that he knew nothing of it in advance and that what the leadership knew of the details came from reading Israeli reports. Mashal, who had headed Hamas's exiled political wing since 2004, has denied being involved in the "details" of Hamas's "military issues," but "justified the killings as a legitimate action against Israelis on 'occupied' lands."

=== 2017 ===
Hamas released A Document of General Principles and Policies, often described as its new or revised charter.

In December 2017, Hamas' leader stated that U.S. President Donald Trump's decision to recognize Jerusalem as Israel's capital was a "Declaration of War" and called for an uprising against the Jewish State.

=== 2024 ===
In July 2024, Ismail Haniyeh, the top overall Hamas political leader, was killed in Tehran, Iran in a predawn blast. Hamas stated that Haniyeh was killed by an anti-personnel missile, with Iran's Revolutionary Guards stating that a 7kg warhead was involved. Western reports suggest he might have been killed by a bomb planted in his room at IRGC-run guesthouse.

Following Haniyeh's death, Yahya Sinwar, the leader of Hamas in Gaza, was elected chairman of the group, replacing Haniyeh. Per Hamas officials, he was elected due to his considerable popularity in the Arab and Islamic worlds following the 2023 Hamas-led attack on Israel and his strong connections with Iran and the "Axis of Resistance," an informal Iranian-led political and military coalition.

In October 2024, new Hamas leader Yahya Sinwar was killed in combat in Gaza with the Israeli military.

=== 2025 ===
In January 2025, Hamas confirmed that its senior military chief, Mohammed Deif, was killed by Israel 's military in July last year.

In March 2025, Ismail Barhoum, a member of Hamas's political bureau was killed in an Israeli attack on Nasser Hospital in Khan Younis.

In April 2025, Yahya Fathi Abd al-Qader Abu Shaar, the head of Hamas' weapons smuggling network, was killed by Israeli army.

On 13 May 2025, Mohammed Sinwar, Hamas leader in Gaza and the brother of Yahya Sinwar, was killed by Israeli airstrike in the southern Gaza Strip. Muhammed Shabana, commander of the Rafah Brigade, was also killed in the same strike.

On 30 August 2025, Abu Obaida, the spokesman for Hamas's armed wing, was killed in an Israeli aerial attack in Gaza City.

On 13 December 2025, Israel's assassination killed senior commander Ra'ad Sa'ad (Raed Saed), who was described as the second-in-command of the Hamas's armed wing.

=== 2026 ===
On 15 May 2026, Izz al-Din al-Haddad, the head of Hamas’s armed wing in Gaza, was killed by an Israeli attack. On 26 May, his successor Mohammed Odeh was killed in an Israeli strike, less than two weeks after killing of al-Haddad.

On 10 September 2026, Israel assassinated Mohammed ‌Abdel Salam al-Yazouri (aka Abu Al-Haitham), the commander of Gaza's Khan Younis Brigade in the Qassam Brigades.

On 29 September 2026, Izz al-Din al-Beik, the head of Hamas’s armed wing in the northern Gaza Strip, was killed by an Israeli air attack.

== Allegations of Israeli support for Hamas ==
On 24 Jan. 2009, Andrew Higgins wrote in The Wall Street Journal that Israel had "Helped to Spawn Hamas". He quoted Professor Avner Cohen, a former Israeli religious affairs official and a Tunisian-born Jew who worked for more than two decades for the Israeli government's religious affairs department in Gaza, as saying "Hamas, to my great regret, is Israel's creation" and that Israel had "encouraged them as a counterweight to ... Palestine Liberation Organization and its dominant faction, Yasser Arafat's Fatah."

On 8 October 2023, Tal Schneider said in an op-ed article in The Times of Israel that Netanyahu's policy for years had been to prevent the establishment of a Palestinian state by treating Hamas as a partner at the expense of Mahmoud Abbas, the Palestinian Authority and its West Bank government, resulting in "wounds that would take Israel years to heal from". For years, she wrote, Netanyahu divided power between the Gaza Strip and the West Bank, bringing Abbas to his knees while propping up Hamas. One method she described was collaborating with Hamas to increase the number of Israeli work permits granted to Gazan laborers, from approximately 2,000-3,000 work permits in 2021 to 20,000 after Netanyahu's return to power in 2023. She also wrote that "While Netanyahu does not make these kind of statements publicly or officially, his words are in line with the policy that he implemented."

On 9 October 2023, an article was written by Haaretz that mentioned Netanyahu treated Hamas as a partner by covertly funding and supporting them to make a two-state solution impossible. The article also mentioned that in March 2019, he told his colleagues of the Likud Party,

"Anyone who wants to thwart the establishment of a Palestinian state has to support bolstering Hamas and transferring money to Hamas. This is part of our strategy - to isolate the Palestinians in Gaza from the Palestinians in the West Bank".

On 10 December 2023, The New York Times reported that Qatari officials had delivered millions of dollars per month in cash to Gaza, "billions of dollars over roughly a decade" to help prop up the Hamas government there. Dan Margalit, an Israeli journalist, stated in an interview that "Mr. Netanyahu told him that having two strong rivals, including Hamas, would lessen pressure on him to negotiate toward a Palestinian state". Just weeks before 7 October, the head of Mossad told Qatari officials that "Prime Minister Benjamin Netanyahu of Israel not only tolerated those payments, he had encouraged them."

On 19 January 2024, Reuters reported that Josep Borrell, the EU foreign policy chief, said while receiving an honorary doctorate from the University of Valladolid that "Israel had financed the creation of Palestinian militant group Hamas, publicly contradicting Prime Minister Benjamin Netanyahu who has denied such allegations." and that "Borrell added the only peaceful solution included the creation of a Palestinian state. 'We only believe a two-state solution imposed from the outside would bring peace even though Israel insists on the negative,' he said." Borrell also described Israel as having "created Hamas", but immediately continued saying that "yes, Hamas was financed by Israel to weaken the Palestinian Authority".

== Brief timeline ==
- 1984 – Arrest of Sheikh Ahmed Yassin, sentenced to 12 years of prison after the discovery of an arms cache. Yassin is freed the next year.
- 1987 – Creation of Hamas by Sheikh Ahmed Yassin.
- 1987– First Intifada begins.
- 1988 – Hamas Covenant.
- 1989 – Israel outlaws Hamas and imprisons Sheikh Ahmed Yassin.
- 1991 – Gulf War.
- 1992 – Creation of the military branch Izz ad-Din al-Qassam.
- 1993 – Oslo Accords.
- April 1993 – First Hamas suicide bombing at Mehola Junction.
- 1996 – 1996 Palestinian legislative and presidential election Hamas boycotts them, allowing Fatah, led by Yasser Arafat, a large victory.
- 5 January 1996 – Targeted killing of Yahya Ayyash, Hamas bomb maker.
- February – March 1996 – 47 Israelis killed in three different bombings.
- October 1997 – Freed by Prime Minister Benjamin Netanyahu for "humanitarian reasons" (actually, due to the botched killing attempt on Khaled Mashal, on 25 September 1997, by the Mossad in Jordan, a deal was brokered by Bill Clinton between Israel and Jordan) Sheikh Yassin is acclaimed as a hero on his return to Gaza.
- March 1998 – Death of Mohiyedine Sharif, master bombmaker
- September 2000 – Beginning of Al-Aqsa Intifada.
- July 2002 – Killing of Salah Shahade, leader of the Ezzedeen-al-qassam brigades.
- 8 March 2003 – Israel kills Ibrahim al-Makadmeh, a leader of the Hamas's military wing. 3 other men are also killed.
- 6 January 2004 – 10-year truce (hudna) offered by senior Hamas official Abdel Aziz al-Rantissi in exchange of Israel's complete withdrawal to the 1967 borders.
- 22 March 2004 – Killing of Sheikh Yassin. Yassin, then an old man restricted to a wheel-chair due to his lifelong paralysis was killed in an Israeli missile strike. Abdel Aziz al-Rantissi replaced him as the leader of Hamas. On 28 March, Rantissi stated in a speech given at The Islamic University in Gaza that "America declared war against God. Sharon declared war against God, and God declared war against America, Bush and Sharon".
- 17 April 2004 – Killing of Abdel Aziz al-Rantissi. Rantissi was also killed in an air strike by the Israeli Air Force, five hours after a fatal suicide bombing by Hamas. Khaled Mashal, the leader of Hamas in Syria, said Hamas should not disclose the name of its next leader in Gaza.
- 18 April 2004, Hamas secretly selected a new leader in the Gaza Strip, fearing he would be killed if his identity were made public. However, it was speculated that the new leader is Mahmoud al-Zahar; the second-in-command, Ismail Haniyeh; and third-in-command, Said Seyam.
- September 2004 – Israeli army Chief of Staff Moshe Ya'alon said that Israel would "deal with [...] those who support terrorism", including those in "terror command posts in Damascus".
- 26 September 2004 – Killing of Izz El-Deen Sheikh Khalil. Sheikh Khalil was killed by a car bomb in Damascus, Syria. Khalil was described variously as "mid-level", "senior", a "distinguished member", and believed to be in charge of the group's military wing outside the Palestinian territories. In a statement released in Gaza, Hamas threatened to target Israelis abroad in retaliation.
- October 2004 – Killing of Adnan al-Ghoul, assistant of Mohammed Deif, the leader of the Izz ad-Din al-Qassam brigades.
- 11 November 2004 – Death of Yasser Arafat, chairman of the Palestine Liberation Organization (PLO) and president of the Palestinian National Authority.
- January 2005 Palestinian presidential election – Hamas boycotts them. PLO chairman Mahmoud Abbas elected to replace Yasser Arafat.
- Palestinian municipal elections, January–May 2005 – Relative success of Hamas, which took control of Beit Lahia in northern Gaza, Qalqilyah in the West Bank and Rafah.
- March 2005 – Hamas proclaims tahdiyah, a period of calm.
- 25 January 2006 – Victory of the Hamas at the legislative election, which took 74 seats of the 132 seats.
- March 2007 – The Palestinian Legislative Council established a national unity government headed by Ismail Haniyeh.
- June 2007 – Hamas begins a takeover of Gaza, ending the coalition with Fatah.
- 31 July 2024 – Senior military chief of Hamas, Mohammed Deif, was killed by Israel 's military.
- 31 July 2024 – Hamas leader, Ismail Haniyeh was killed in Iran.
- 16 October 2024 – New Hamas leader Yahya Sinwar was killed in combat in Gaza with the Israeli military
- April 2025 – Yahya Fathi Abd al-Qader Abu Shaar, the head of Hamas' weapons smuggling network, was killed by Israeli army.
- May 2025 – Mohammed Sinwar, Hamas leader in Gaza and the brother of Yahya Sinwar, was allegedly killed by Israeli airstrike in the southern Gaza Strip. Muhammed Shabana, commander of the Rafah Brigade, was also killed in the same strike.
- 30 August 2025 – Abu Obaida, the spokesman for Hamas' armed wing, was killed by Israeli military.
- 13 December 2025, Israel's assassination killed senior commander Ra'ad Sa'ad (Raed Saed), who was described as the second-in-command of the Hamas's armed wing.
- 15 May 2026 - Izz al-Din al-Haddad, the head of Hamas’s armed wing in Gaza, was killed by an Israeli attack.
- 26 May 2026, Mohammed Odeh, successor of al-Haddad, was killed in an Israeli strike.

== See also ==
- Outline of the Gaza war
