= Gaza European Hospital =

Hospital in Gaza Strip, Palestine

European Gaza Hospital مستشفى غزة الاوروبي

Geography
- Location: Al-Fukhari, Gaza Strip, Palestine
- Coordinates: 31°18′14.44″N 34°19′11.48″E

Organisation
- Type: hospital

History
- Constructed: 1989

The European Hospital (Arabic: مستشفى غزة الاوروبي) is a public hospital in Al-Fukhari near Khan Yunis in the southern Gaza Strip, Palestine. It was founded by the UNRWA with a grant from the European Union in 1989.

Initial construction costs for the 232-bed European Hospital were estimated at $45 million. The goal was providing primary and secondary healthcare for Gaza residents. The hospital was still under construction in 1999.

In 2019, the hospital served an estimated 17,500 patients a month. It is one of the three main referral hospitals in the Gaza Strip. According to a United Nations Development Programme report, the hospital provides laboratory services, imaging services (CT, MRI, X-ray), intensive care units, and specialised surgeries. The hospital is located next to the Palestine College of Nursing.

== Gaza war ==
On 31 October 2023, Israeli air raids targeted the vicinity of the European Hospital. On 13 November Tom Potokar, chief Red Crescent surgeon at the hospital, wrote on Twitter that he was treating many patients for shrapnel wounds.

On 19 November, after the Al-Shifa Hospital siege ended with Israeli forces controlling Al-Shifa Hospital, the World Health Organization stated it was planning missions to transport the remaining Al-Shifa patients to the European Hospital and Nasser Medical Complex in the next 2–3 days. On 23 November, the head of the Medical Emergency Rescue Committee at the Indonesia Hospital stated that patients and staff at Indonesia Hospital had been evacuated to the European Hospital.

In May 2024, foreign healthcare workers serving at European Hospital were trapped inside Gaza when Israel seized control of the Rafah Border crossing. US Senator Tammy Duckworth advocated for the evacuation of one of the stranded doctors, Adam Hamawy, whom she credited with saving her life after she was injured in Iraq. Hamawy spoke to The Washington Post about the supply shortages and the many wounded children he had been treating in European Hospital.

In July 2024, the Israeli Defense Forces (IDF) ordered an evacuation of the area where the European Hospital is located, later releasing a statement that the hospital was not included in the order. Staff, patients, and displaced people left the hospital with difficulty due to the condition of the roads and some of the patients. Many evacuated to Nasser Hospital. While it was closed, many supplies were stolen. The hospital re-opened in September with limited capacity.

Several foreign doctors have volunteered at European Hospital and spoken to the press about their experiences there. According to Dr. Mark Perlmutter and Dr. Feroze Sidwa, they had never before witnessed "cruelty like Israel's genocide in Gaza", despite serving on multiple humanitarian missions in developing countries, natural disasters, and war zones. Perlmutter has reported that 90% of the emergency room patients he encountered were children and that some appeared to have been deliberately targeted by IDF snipers. In July 2024, 45 doctors, including Perlmutter and Sidwa, wrote an open letter to Joe Biden and Kamala Harris to advocate for a ceasefire and arms embargo.

On 13 May 2025, the hospital compound was targeted by several Israeli airstrikes, killing 26 people and injuring dozens. The IDF and Shin Bet said that the strike targeted Hamas militants including Hamas leader Muhammed Sinwar. The London-based newspaper Asharq Al-Awsat reported that "the location did in fact contain a tunnel system previously damaged in the 2014 war." The IDF published a video showing the tunnels beneath the hospital. On 28 May 2025, Israeli Prime Minister Benjamin Netanyahu said that Sinwar had been killed. On 31 May 2025, the IDF and Shin Bet confirmed that Sinwar had been killed. On 8 June 2025, the IDF said it had found Sinwar's body in an "underground passageway beneath the European Hospital" in Khan Yunis. On 31 August, Hamas confirmed Sinwar's death without providing further details.

On 7 June 2025, the Israel Defense Forces (IDF) released footage of tunnels beneath a hospital in Gaza. This claim was rejected by the Government Media Office in Gaza on 8 June 2025.

Following this rejection, the IDF organized a controlled tour for selected media outlets, marking the first visit by Western journalists to Gaza in several months. According to the IDF, access to the tunnel was delayed because “we had to ventilate it for a few days before allowing anyone down there,” citing the buildup of gases from decomposing bodies. The BBC, which was not included in the controlled media tour, reported through its BBC Verify unit that although they identified a recently excavated hole near the hospital's accident and emergency entrance, they could not independently verify whether the tunnels and associated rooms were indeed located beneath the hospital. The BBC also requested unedited video footage without cuts, but the IDF did not provide it.

On 17 June 2025, the IDF announced that it had sealed the tunnel by pouring approximately 250 cubic meters of concrete into it.

== See also ==
- List of hospitals in the State of Palestine
- Attacks on health facilities during the Gaza war
