= Potokar =

Potokar is a surname. Notable people with the surname include:

- Cita Potokar (1915–1993), Slovene painter
- Majda Potokar (1930–2001), Slovene film and theater actress
- Nejc Potokar (born 1988), Slovene footballer
- Tom Potokar (born 1964), British researcher
