= Palestine College of Nursing =

College in Gaza Strip, Palestine

- كلية فلسطين للتمريض
- Motto: نسعى للرقي بمهنة التمريض
- Motto in English: We strive for the advancement of the nursing profession
- Type: University College
- Affiliations: Palestinian Ministry of Health
- Academic affiliations: Palestinian Ministry of High Education
- Dean: Dr. Akram M. Abusalah
- Location: Khan Yunis, Gaza Strip, Palestine; 31.302638°N 34.317226°W
- Language: Arabic, English
- Website: https://pcn.edu.ps/

Palestine College of Nursing (Arabic: كلية فلسطين للتمريض) is a Palestinian university college in Khan Yunis, Gaza Strip. The school is administratively and financially affiliated to the Palestinian Ministry of Health. Its academic program is supervised by the Palestinian Ministry of High Education.

== History ==
Palestine College of Nursing first opened in 1976 in Khan Yunis, in Al-Fukhari. It opened first under the name of Al-Hakimat School, until the establishment of the Palestinian National Authority in 1994, where it was the renamed to the Palestine College of Nursing. In 1997, the school expanded from a college to a university college, providing a bachelor's degree after being officially recognized by the Ministry of Health. In 2001, a branch of the college opened in Gaza City. It is close to the UNRWA-run Gaza European Hospital, which opened in 1989.

After the start of the Gaza war and genocide in 2023, Palestine College of Nursing was one of many colleges in the Gaza Strip that was targeted with bombings by the Israeli military. By 2024, all institutions of higher education in Gaza had been attacked, in what been by scholarly observers as "scholasticide" and "a war against education."

== See also ==
- Education in Palestine
- Attacks on schools during the Gaza war
