= Youssef Abu al-Rish =

Palestinian doctor and politician

Youssef Abu al-Rish (Arabic: يوسف أبو الريش) is a Palestinian Doctor and the Deputy Minister of Health in the Hamas-led administration of the Gaza Strip.

== Biography ==
Little is known about his early life but he has been working as a doctor in Gaza for many years, he first emerged in public sources around 2015 as an undersecretary/Deputy Minister of Health in Gaza, warning of critical medical shortages, hospital closures, and a severe lack of salaries for health workers under the Palestinian unity government.

In 2019, he led Gaza’s COVID‑19 prevention strategy, organizing response committees, training personnel, and enhancing diagnostics and containment measures.

In 2022, he advocated for increased international funding and support to sustain Gaza’s health infrastructure, citing a 75% drop in drug and supply stocks and a steep decline in UN aid.

=== Gaza War ===
On 27 December 2024, during the Gaza War when IDF attacked the Kamal Awan hospital. Youssef Abu al-Rish said Israeli forces had set fire to the surgical department, laboratory and a storehouse and calling for international forces to intervene.

He is identified as the Ten of Spade in the Hamas most wanted playing cards.

== See also ==
- Hamas most wanted playing cards
