= Muhammad Atzar =

Hamas commander (died 2023)

- محمد عتزار

Personal details
- Died: November 1, 2023 Jabalia, Gaza Strip

Military service
- Allegiance: Hamas
- Branch/service: Izz ad-Din al-Qassam Brigades
- Rank: Commander
- Commands: Anti-Tank Missile Unit
- Battles/wars: Gaza war: Israeli invasion of the Gaza Strip

Muhammad Atzar (محمد عتزار ; died 1 Nov 2023) was a senior commander in the Izz ad-Din al-Qassam Brigades, the military wing of Hamas. He served as the head of the anti-tank missile unit in the Gaza Strip, where he directed numerous operations targeting Israeli Defense Forces (IDF) and armored vehicles.

Atzar was killed in an Israeli airstrike on 1 November 2023 during the early phase of the Israeli invasion of the Gaza Strip. The strike targeted a building in the Jabalia refugee camp, and was carried out jointly by the IDF and Shin Bet based on specific intelligence.

According to Israeli sources, Atzar was involved in planning and executing numerous attacks using anti-tank guided missiles (ATGMs) against Israeli vehicles and force.

He was identified as the Nine of Clubs in the Hamas most wanted playing cards.

== See also ==
- Hamas
- Izz ad-Din al-Qassam Brigades
- Israeli invasion of the Gaza Strip
- Hamas most wanted playing cards
