= Mohammed Odeh (Palestinian militant) =

Palestinian Hamas military leader (1974–2026)

- مُحَمَّد عَوْدَة
- Photo used by the Israel Defense Forces to announce Odeh's killing

5th Hamas leader in the Gaza Strip
- In office 18 May 2026 – 26 May 2026
- Preceded by: Izz al-Din al-Haddad
- Succeeded by: Vacant

9th Commander of the Izz al-Din al‑Qassam Brigades
- In office 15 May 2026 – 26 May 2026
- Preceded by: Izz al-Din al-Haddad
- Succeeded by: Vacant

Intelligence Chief of the Izz al-Din al‑Qassam Brigades (Note: Reportedly Imad Aqel served or still serves as Intelligence Chief of the Izz al-Din al-Qassam Brigades.)
- In office Unknown – 26 May 2026
- Preceded by: Unknown
- Succeeded by: Unknown

Head of Operations of the Izz al-Din al‑Qassam Brigades
- In office c. 13 December 2025 – 26 May 2026
- Preceded by: Ra'ad Sa'ad

Personal details
- Born: 1974 Jabalia refugee camp, al-Khulafa al-Rashidin, Gaza Strip
- Died: 26 May 2026 (aged 51–52) al-Kayali building, Rimal, Gaza City, Gaza Strip
- Cause of death: Assassination by airstrike

Military service
- Allegiance: Hamas
- Branch: Al-Qassam Brigades (Northern Camp faction)
- Service years: 2000–2026
- Rank: Commander
- Conflicts: Gaza war X; October 7 attacks

Mohammed Odeh (Note: Should not be confused with: Mohammed Odeh (1968/1969–2006), local leader of Hamas in Qalqilya or Hableh; Mohammed Odeh (1972/1973), Hamas militant involved in the Hebrew University bombing) (Arabic: مُحَمَّد عَوْدَة, romanized: Muḥammad ʿŌde; 1974 – 26 May 2026) was a Palestinian Hamas militant who briefly served as the leader of Hamas in the Gaza Strip and as the commander of the Al-Qassam Brigades in May 2026, following the assassination of his predecessor, Izz al-Din al-Haddad, before being assassinated himself later that month.

He was a member of the Brigades' Military Council and had long served as its head of intelligence. Following the assassination of Ra'ad Sa'ad in December 2025, he reportedly took over responsibility for the Brigades' operations and weapons manufacturing.

He was reportedly among the last members of the Brigades' senior leadership council.

== Early life ==
Odeh was born in 1974 in al-Khulafa al-Rashidin in the Jabalia refugee camp.

== Militant career ==
Odeh joined Hamas during the First Intifada in 1987. He was a member of the Majd force, which was responsible for pursuing Palestinian collaborators with Israel. He joined al-Qassam Brigades in 2000, being one of the first people to participate in its activities during the Second Intifada. He held relations with Hamas leaders such as Yahya Sinwar, Nizar Rayan, and Mohammed Deif.

While primarily working in the intelligence sector, Odeh also commanded a battalion in central Jabalia for several years before briefly joining the al-Qassam Brigades' arms manufacturing department. Between 2017 and 2019, he served as the commander of the militia's northern Gaza brigade. During this time, he hosted Mohammed Sinwar at a tunnel in Beit Hanoun.

He played a key role in the development of the al-Qassam Brigades' intelligence division, particularly after the discovery of an Israeli espionage ring in Gaza in November 2018, which Hamas described as an "intelligence treasure trove". As commander of the intelligence division, he oversaw the gathering of information on Israeli military bases in the Gaza envelope. He emphasized analyzing weaknesses in the IDF's Gaza Division, and constantly handed intelligence over to Hamas's military council.

During the Gaza war, he was a close associate of Izz al-Din al-Haddad, being in continuous contact with him. The two developed plans to restructure the military command after the assassinations of Mohammed Deif and Mohammed Sinwar. After the assassination of Mohammed Sinwar in May 2025, Odeh was offered the leadership of the al-Qassam Brigades, but declined at that time. In October 2025, it was reported that he had replaced Ahmed Ghandour, who died in 2023, as Commander of the al-Qassam Brigades in North Gaza. In December, he took command of the group's operations and arms production wings after the killing of Ra'ad Sa'ad. According to sources close to Hamas, he was possibly the last member of the Brigades' higher leadership council. On 15 May 2026, after al-Haddad was killed in an Israeli airstrike, Odeh was chosen to succeed him as the commander of the al-Qassam Brigades.

On 18 May 2026, three days after he became Commander of the Izz al-Din al-Qassam Brigades, he also became the Hamas leader in the Gaza Strip. With him in command the al-Qassam Brigades are considered to have held the de facto leadership over Hamas.

== Assassination ==
Odeh survived several Israeli assassination attempts during and before the Gaza war, including one after the October 2025 ceasefire that targeted his father's home in the Jabalia refugee camp, which killed his oldest son, Amr.

On 26 May 2026, 11 days after Odeh's predecessor al-Haddad's assassination, Israeli prime minister Benjamin Netanyahu and defense minister Israel Katz announced that the Israel Defense Forces had targeted Odeh in an airstrike. The strikes reportedly hit a building in Rimal, Gaza City, killing at least three and injuring over 20 others. On 27 May 2026, Odeh's death was confirmed by Katz. Gaza media outlets confirmed that he was killed alongside his wife and three of his children. Hamas and its military wing later confirmed his death. After his death, it was speculated that Hussein Fayyad, Haitham Khuwajari, Nafez Sabih or Imad Aqel would succeed him.
