= Abu Obeida =

Spokesman for al-Qassam Brigades (1985–2025)

- Native name: أبو عبيدة
- Born: Huthayfa Samir Abdallah al-Kahlout; 11 February 1985; Saudi Arabia
- Died: 30 August 2025 (aged 40) Rimal, Gaza City, Palestine
- Cause of death: Assassination by airstrike
- Allegiance: Hamas
- Branch: Al-Qassam Brigades
- Service years: 2002–2025
- Rank: Spokesperson
- Conflicts: Second Intifada; Gaza War (2008–2009); 2012 Gaza War; 2014 Gaza War; Gaza war X
- Education: Islamic University of Gaza (MA)

Huthayfa Samir Abdallah al-Kahlout (Arabic: حذيفة سمير عبد الله الكحلوت; 11 February 1985 – 30 August 2025), known by the nom de guerre Abu Obeida (Arabic: أبو عبيدة, romanized: Abū ʿUbayda, lit. 'father of worshippers'; also spelled Ubaida, Ubayda, Ubaydah) was a Palestinian militant and spokesperson for al-Qassam Brigades, the military wing of Hamas, from 2007 until he was killed by the Israel Defense Forces in 2025. He was described as "the central figure of al-Qassam's media campaign."

== Early life and education ==
Huthayfa Samir Abdallah al-Kahlout was born in 1985 in Saudi Arabia. According to his brother Suhayb, their family, known as al-Kahlout, had Kurdish origin and settled around Ashkelon when it was captured by Saladin. Before the formation of Israel, his family lived in Ni'ilya, until they were expelled by Zionist militias during the 1948 Palestine War and arrived in Gaza. After the family left Saudi Arabia in 1998, he grew up in the Jabalia refugee camp in northern Gaza. Abu Obeida first emerged in 2002, representing the Qassam Brigades to the media and at press conferences. After the Israeli disengagement from Gaza in 2005, he was officially appointed the spokesman for Al-Qassam.

In 2013, he graduated from the Islamic University of Gaza with a master's degree in Islamic studies.

== Career ==
Abu Obeida made his first appearance in 2006, when he announced the capture of Israeli soldier Gilad Shalit. In 2014, he announced the capture of Oron Shaul, who was killed during the 2014 Gaza War and had his body held by Hamas until 2025.

According to the United States, Abu Obeida had been the spokesman of the Qassam Brigades since at least 2007. He only appeared wearing a red keffiyeh covering his face. In 2014, Israeli media outlets released a photo, allegedly of Abu Obeida. However, the validity of the photo and name were denied by the al-Qassam Brigades. In April 2024, United States Department of Treasury issued sanctions against Abu Obeida and re-asserted his identity as al-Kahlout.

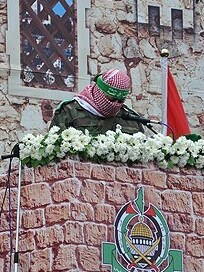
Obeida in his keffiyeh while giving a speech in 2012

In June 2020, in response to plans by Israeli leaders to officially annex parts of the West Bank, Abu Obeida said that "the forces of the resistance will faithfully protect the Palestinian people," and vowed to "make the enemy bite its fingers in regret for such a sinful decision." He described the Israeli plans as a "declaration of war." During the 2021 escalation in the Palestinian-Israeli conflict, Abu Obeida said that striking Tel Aviv, Dimona, Ashdod, Ashkelon and Beersheba were "easier for us than drinking water," proclaiming that "there are no red lines when responding to the aggression." After a ceasefire agreement was reached, he said, "With the help of God, we were able to humiliate the enemy, its fragile entity and its savage army."

In September 2021, after four out of the six Gilboa prison escapees were rearrested by Israeli forces, Abu Obeida announced that no future prisoner exchange with Israel would take place without freeing the escapees, saying that "if the heroes of the Freedom Tunnel have liberated themselves this time from underground, we promise them and our free prisoners that they will be liberated soon, God willing, from above ground." In June 2022, Abu Obeida announced that the medical condition of one of the Israeli captives in Gaza has deteriorated. The al-Qassam Brigades later released a video showing that the captive in question was Hisham al-Sayed.

On the 12-month anniversary of "Operation Al-Aqsa Flood," Abu Obeida said he could not rule out further deaths among the remaining Israeli captives due to "the danger of crossfire." He also criticized the Israeli government and Prime Minister Netanyahu, stating: "You could have reclaimed all your captives a year ago," and claimed that Hamas's intention had always been to keep them alive in Gaza and exchange them for Palestinian detainees in Israeli prisons. On 19 January 2025, in a video message commenting on the 2025 Gaza war ceasefire, Obeida said Hamas had made every possible effort to protect the lives of the captives held in Gaza since 7 October 2023. "The [ceasefire] deal ... could have been reached over a year ago," he stated, “yet Netanyahu's malicious ambitions led him to continue this genocidal war.”

In May 2022, in response to Israeli calls to assassinate Hamas leader Yahya Sinwar following several Palestinian attacks on Israelis, Abu Obeida said that if "the enemy and its failing leadership" hurt Sinwar, it would unleash a "regional earthquake and an unprecedented response." In October 2023, during the early stages of the Gaza war, Abu Obeida said that Hamas would kill one civilian hostage every time Israel targeted civilians in their homes in Gaza without warning: "We announce that every targeting of our people who are safe in their homes without warning, we will regretfully meet with the execution of our enemy's civilian hostages."

== Assassination ==
On 30 August 2025, he was assassinated in an Israeli airstrike at his residence in an apartment building in Gaza City. The strike, which hit the city's Rimal neighborhood, killed at least 11 people, including Abu Obeida and children. A Palestinian source later told Al Arabiya that Obeida was killed, along with everyone else in the building. Israeli Defense Minister Israel Katz and the Israel Defense Forces confirmed his death the following day. On 29 December, Hamas confirmed Obeida's death, and reaffirmed the deaths of former Hamas leader Mohammed Sinwar, former commander of the Rafah Brigade Muhammad Shabana, senior commander Ra'ad Sa'ad and Hakam Al-Issa who were also killed by Israel. Hamas' armed wing, Al-Qassam Brigades, on its Telegram channel, released a video statement where it said: “We pause in reverence before … the masked man loved by millions … the great martyred commander and spokesperson of the Qassam Brigades, Abu Obeida.”

That same day, Hamas also announced the introduction of a new spokesman who will take Kahlout's nom de guerre.

== Analysis ==
According to a 2024 analysis of Abu Obeida's rhetoric, Obeida was a spokesperson for the military wing of Hamas, who mobilized crowds and sowed dissent. According to the same paper, he was said to justify armed resistance as a legitimate action against the Zionist occupation. The paper also notes that he linked Zionism to American politics.

== Works ==
- al-Kahlout, Huthayfa Samir Abdallah (2013). الأرض المقدسة بين اليهودية والنصرانية والإسلام [The Holy Land, Between Judaism, Christianity, and Islam] (Thesis) (in Arabic). Islamic University of Gaza.

== See also ==
- Abu Hamza
