= Tom Potokar =

British plastic surgeon (born 1964)

Professor Tom Potokar OBE, FRCS
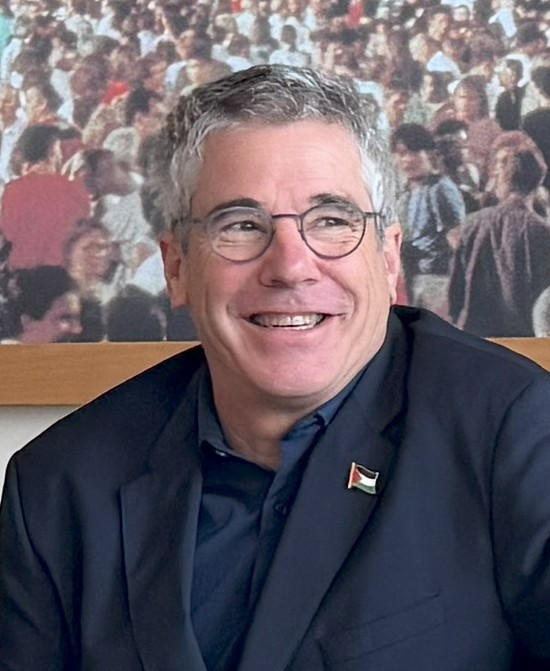
- Potokar in 2025
- Born: Thomas Stephen Potokar; January 1964 (age 62)
- Education: University of Birmingham (MBChB); Liverpool School of Tropical Medicine (DTM&H)
- Occupations: Plastic surgeon, professor
- Known for: Global burn injury research and policy; Founder and director of Interburns; Chief surgeon of the International Committee of the Red Cross (ICRC)
- Board member of: Chair, Centre for Global Burn Injury Policy & Research
- Medical career
- Field: Plastic surgery; Burn care; Reconstructive surgery
- Institutions: Morriston Hospital (former consultant); Swansea University; International Committee of the Red Cross (since 2021)
- Research: Burn epidemiology, prevention, global health

Professor Thomas Stephen Potokar OBE (born January 1964) is chair of the Centre for Global Burn Injury Policy & Research at Swansea University. He is the founder and director of the charity Interburns. Potokar has been the chief surgeon of the ICRC since 2021. During the Gaza war, Potokar shared his experiences while he was working in the European Hospital in southern Gaza, describing an over-capacity hospital with Palestinian civilians who had suffered shrapnel wounds.
