= Imad Aqel (Palestinian militant) =

Hamas military leader

- عماد عقل
- Military career
- Allegiance: Al Qassam Brigades (Hamas)
- Branch: Izz ad-Din al-Qassam Brigades

Imad Aqel (عماد عقل) is a Palestinian militant who has served as a member of the Military Council of Hamas' Al-Qassam Brigades and the home front commander. He is reportedly in charge of the group's military intelligence. Since the May 2026 death of Mohammed Odeh, he is believed to be the last living senior Hamas militant leader in Gaza connected to the October 7 attacks.

== Biography ==
Aqel originally lived in the Nuseirat Camp, moving to Zaytoun district of Gaza City in September 2000 during the beginning of the Second Intifada. He was accused of being behind the assassination of Rajeh Abu Lehia, commander of the Riot Control Unit in the Palestinian Civil Police Force. He has served as the commander of the Central Brigade and the Gaza Brigade of Izz ad-Din al-Qassam Brigades. He has been targeted twice for assassination by Israel.

Aqel previously led the Brigades' Rear Echelon staff. He currently serves as the head of the Brigades' Support and Logistics System. One of his sons was killed by Israel following the October 7 attacks. According to Hamas sources, he played no direct role in planning or supervising the October 7 attacks, "like other leaders who were not informed of the full details or even the zero hour." Another of his sons was killed by the Doghmush clan on 12 October 2025.
