= Tawfik Jaber =

Palestinian police chief

Tawfik Jaber (Arabic: توفيق جابر; died 27 December 2008) was the chief of police in Gaza, and was one of the most prominent figures among those killed on the first day of the 2008–2009 Israel–Gaza conflict.

Jaber was originally affiliated with the Palestinian nationalist Palestinian political party, Fatah, switching his loyalty to the Hamas government in the Gaza Strip in 2007.

Bill Dienst, an American doctor who met Jaber at a Gaza border crossing in the summer of 2008, when Dienst and other activists were denied passage into the strip, said that Jaber told him that he had not seen his wife for years: "He couldn't get out and she couldn't get in. It's a common story there."

Jaber was among 40 people killed on 27 December 2008 at a police headquarters in Gaza City where Hamas was hosting a graduation ceremony for new recruits. Of his death, Dienst said: "These are traffic cops who provide law and order. ... Those people were not shooting rockets. They were trying to build a civil society."
