= Haitham Khuwajari =

Palestinian Hamas commander

- هيثم الحواجري

Military service
- Allegiance: Hamas
- Branch/service: Izz ad-Din al-Qassam Brigades
- Rank: Commander
- Commands: Shati Battalion
- Battles/wars: Gaza war; October 7 attacks; Israeli invasion of the Gaza Strip

Haitham Khuwajari (Arabic: هيثم الحواجري), is a senior Palestinian military commander in the Al-Qassam Brigades, the armed wing of Hamas. He leads the Shati Battalion which is active in Gaza’s Shati refugee camp.

== Early life ==
Little is publicly known about Khuwajari's early life. He rose through the ranks of the al‑Qassam Brigades to become the commander of the Shati Battalion, which is operating within Gaza’s Shati refugee camp.

== Militant career ==
According to Israeli forces, Khuwajari participated and commanded attacks inside Israel during the October 7 attacks.

He is identified as the Seven of Hearts in the Hamas most wanted playing cards.

== Assassination attempt ==
On 4 December 2023, Israeli forces claimed to have killed Khuwajari in an airstrike near Shati Refugee camp.

During the January 2025 Gaza war ceasefire, many media sources confirmed Khuwajari was alive, participating publicly in the hostage exchange in Gaza’s port, handing over American-Israeli hostage Keith Siegel. Israeli forces subsequently acknowledged its claim had been incorrect.

== See also ==
- October 7 attacks
- Hamas most wanted playing cards
