= Assassination of Abu Obeida =

2025 assassination in Gaza City

- Part of the 2025 Gaza City offensive and the Gaza war
- Location: Rimal, Gaza City, Gaza Strip
- Date: 30 August 2025
- Target: Abu Obeida
- Attack type: Airstrikes
- Deaths: 11+
- Injuries: 20+
- Perpetrator: Israel Defense Forces

On 30 August 2025, Abu Obeida, the spokesperson for the Al-Qassam Brigades was killed by Israeli airstrikes targeted at the Rimal neighborhood in Gaza City.

== Background ==
Abu Obeida had served as the spokesperson for the Al-Qassam Brigades since 2007. He was described as "the central figure of al-Qassam's media campaign." He was one of Hamas's best known representatives in the Arab world, frequently appearing in videos disseminated by Hamas masked in a red-checkered Palestinian keffiyeh and threatened Israel with dire consequences. Israel and the United States named him Huthayfa al-Kahlout, although this was never confirmed by Hamas.

Amid the 2025 Gaza City offensive, Abu Obeida threatened Israel on 29 August that it would "pay the price" with "its soldiers' blood" if it sought to conquer Gaza City.

== Assassination ==
11 people, including children, were reportedly killed in the strikes, while another 20 were injured. The attack was targeted at an apartment building which Obeida was taking shelter in. Times of Israel reported that Abu Obeida's wife and children were with him inside his apartment at the time of the Israeli attack and that it is "likely" that his "entire family" was killed.

Five missiles struck the second and third floors of the six-story apartment in the Rimal neighborhood.

== Casualties ==
Witnesses on the ground reported children being killed and injured. Al Jazeera English posted a video of the aftermath, showing young children maimed by the attack.

== Reactions and aftermath ==
Israeli defense minister Israel Katz said that the Israel Defense Forces had killed Abu Obeida, calling it a "flawless execution." The IDF and Shin Bet said in a joint statement that the operation had been "made possible due to prior intelligence gathered by Shin Bet and the IDF's Intelligence Directorate" and said that Abu Obeida "served as the public face of the Hamas terrorist organization" and "disseminated Hamas' propaganda."

On 29 December, Hamas confirmed Obeida's death. Hamas also announced the introduction of a new spokesman and will take the same nom de guerre, Abu Obeida.

== See also ==
- Assassination of Ismail Haniyeh
- Killing of Yahya Sinwar
- Assassination of Fuad Shukr
- Assassination of Hassan Nasrallah
