= Izz al-Din al-Haddad =

Hamas military leader (1970–2026)

- عز الدين الحداد

4th Hamas leader in the Gaza Strip
- In office 3 June 2025 – 15 May 2026
- Preceded by: Mohammed Sinwar
- Succeeded by: Mohammed Odeh

8th Commander of the Izz al-Din al‑Qassam Brigades
- In office 1 June 2025 – 15 May 2026
- Preceded by: Mohammed Sinwar
- Succeeded by: Mohammed Odeh

Personal details
- Born: 1970 Gaza Strip
- Died: 15 May 2026 (aged 55–56) Rimal, Gaza City, Gaza Strip
- Cause of death: Assassination by airstrike
- Nicknames: Abu Suhaib (kunya); The Ghost of the Gaza Strip

Military service
- Allegiance: Hamas
- Branch: Al-Qassam Brigades (Northern Camp faction)
- Years of service: 1987–2026
- Rank: Commander
- Battles/wars: First Intifada; 2021 Israel–Palestine crisis; Gaza war X; October 7 attacks

Izz al-Din al-Haddad (Arabic: عز الدين الحداد, romanized: ʻIzz al-Dīn al-Ḥaddād, 1970 – 15 May 2026), also known as Ezzedine Al-Haddad and by his nom de guerre Abu Suhaib (Arabic: أبو صهيب), was a Palestinian militant who served as the leader and commander of the Al-Qassam Brigades from June 2025 to May 2026. He also served as the fourth Hamas leader in the Gaza Strip from June 2025 to May 2026. He held both positions following the assassination of his predecessor, Mohammed Sinwar, until his own assassination. He also simultaneously served as the head of the Gaza Brigade and oversaw the northern sector of the Gaza Strip.

Al-Haddad was a member of Hamas's General Military Council and had been instrumental in planning and executing the group's operations. He was known as the "Ghost of al-Qassam" in Gaza.

== Early life and joining Hamas ==
Al-Haddad was born in Gaza in 1970 and joined Hamas at a young age, aligning with the movement since its inception in 1987. He began his career as an operative in the Gaza Brigade and rose through the ranks to become a platoon commander, then a battalion commander, eventually leading the brigade itself.

== Militant career ==
During the 2008–2009 Gaza War, al-Haddad took command of the eastern Gaza City battalion. He was promoted to commander of Al-Qassam Brigades' southern Gaza brigade during the 2012 Gaza War, and assumed control of its Gaza City brigade during the 2021 Israel–Palestine crisis, after the assassination of his predecessor, Bassem Issa. Before the October 7 attacks in 2023, he managed the development of the locally built Al-Yassin 105 missiles. In November 2023, he took command of Hamas's northern Gaza brigade, and became the overall commander of northern Gaza by June 2024. He had commanded at least six battalions and a special forces unit.

Al-Haddad also had a senior role in Hamas's internal security unit, Al-Majd, which engaged in efforts to uncover spies and collaborators with Israel. He was close to Hamas leader Yahya Sinwar, and the pair are thought to have discussed internal security and counterintelligence operations.

Al-Haddad was known for his operational secrecy and rarely appeared in public, earning him the nickname the "Ghost of al-Qassam". However, in May 2022, he was seen in a video threatening Israel, and in January 2025, he gave an interview to Al Jazeera, discussing his role in planning the 7 October attack.

== Gaza war ==
=== Role in the 7 October attacks ===
On 6 October 2023, al-Haddad convened his battalion commanders and distributed written orders for the planned attack on Israel, later known as Operation Al-Aqsa Flood. The orders emphasized the importance of abducting Israeli soldiers and transporting them into Gaza, as well as "live broadcasting and the takedown of Israeli communities". The following day, Hamas launched a surprise attack, resulting in significant casualties and the abduction of Israeli civilians and soldiers. During the attacks, al-Haddad managed the initial incursion into Israeli territory. His instructions led to some of the deadliest attacks during the incursion, particularly the Nahal Oz attack.

=== Activities during the Gaza war ===
In November 2023, Israeli authorities offered US$750,000 for information on al-Haddad leading to his capture or death. During the Gaza war, al-Haddad allegedly oversaw efforts to reconstruct infrastructure during ceasefires. He also oversaw handovers of Israeli hostages. Following the killing of Yahya Sinwar, The Wall Street Journal reported that al-Haddad took command of two regional commands and 14 battalions, practically sharing control of Hamas with Mohammed Sinwar. In 2025, he helped push Mohammed Sinwar to accept the Gaza war ceasefire with Israel, and tried to convince him to release additional hostages before the ceasefire collapsed in March.

==== Interactions with hostages ====
Israeli intelligence assessed that al-Haddad personally held hostages to use as human shields, including soldiers Liri Albag, Daniella Gilboa, Karina Ariev, Naama Levy and Agam Berger from Nahal Oz. After al-Haddad's assassination, the chief of the Israel Defense Forces Eyal Zamir said: "In every conversation I held with the hostages who returned, the name of the arch-terrorist Izz al-Din al-Haddad, one of the chief perpetrators of the October 7 massacre and the head of Hamas' military wing, came up again and again." A former Israeli hostage told The Wall Street Journal that they had met al-Haddad five times, and occasionally slept in the same apartment as him. The former hostage said that during their initial encounter in March 2024, al-Haddad insisted on speaking to hostages in Hebrew and asked them if they had any needs. He once insisted his fighters recover a book that the hostage had left behind. The hostage said that al-Haddad's demeanor had become "more negative" during a later meeting in January 2025. The meeting took place shortly after his son was killed in an airstrike that month. In December 2025, Eitan Mor told Israeli newspaper Makor Rishon that shortly after he was taken hostage by Hamas during the Nova music festival massacre, al-Haddad met him and told Mor in Hebrew that he would be released in two weeks. Al-Haddad met with Mor several other times before his release in October 2025.

In a January 2026 interview with Channel 12, Romi Gonen recounted speaking to al-Haddad over a landline phone during the end of the November 2023 ceasefire in Gaza. Al-Haddad told her that the attacker would be found, and she would be prioritized for release as long as she did not tell anyone that her captors sexually assaulted her. Later, she and fellow hostage Emily Damari were taken to al-Haddad's tunnel in eastern Gaza City. During Gonen's release on 19 January 2025, al-Haddad approached the vehicle she was in and asked her "Do you remember our promise? Here, you're going out first … Do you remember your promise to me? I hope you fulfill it." Gonen falsely assured him that she would before she was driven to be handed off to the Red Cross. One Israeli hostage, who was eventually released, informed reporters that he had seen al-Haddad five times in Gaza and even shared an apartment with him. According to the hostage, al-Haddad stated, "I am responsible for all captives." The captive further stated that al-Haddad enquired about how the hostages evaluated their treatment. When told that some guards were gentler than others, al-Haddad said, "That's life." "There are good people, and there are bad people."

=== Leadership ===
In June 2025, al-Haddad became Hamas's leader after Mohammed Sinwar was assassinated in an Israeli airstrike. He continued to lead the Qassam Brigades' operations in the northern Gaza Strip and was credited by Israeli officials with partially rebuilding its capabilities following significant losses during the ongoing conflict. He viewed the Chechen fight against Russia during the First Chechen War as a model that Hamas should follow against Israel in Gaza. In April 2025, the Shin Bet said that it killed Mahmoud Abu Hiseria, who it claimed was al-Haddad's right-hand man.

As the leader of Hamas in the Gaza Strip, he also had veto power over any ceasefire or hostage deal in the Gaza war. According to Arab officials, he was more open to hostage deals and Israeli demands for Hamas to disarm, but believed that all of the hostages should not be released until the end of the war and an Israeli withdrawal from Gaza. He saw the Gaza war peace plan in October 2025 with scrutiny, believing it was "designed to finish Hamas". However, according to Israeli defense sources, he pushed to accept the ceasefire after learning that the IDF had surrounded the area of Gaza City where his tunnel network was located. During the ceasefire, Israeli officials accused al-Haddad of accumulating money and power as part of a plan to eventually restore Hamas's military wing and its influence on Palestinians, expand its offensive capabilities, tighten relations with the West Bank, and reject diplomatic efforts to weaken the group.

== Unsuccessful targeting and assassination attempts ==
Al-Haddad survived several Israeli assassination attempts, reportedly six, and was considered one of the most wanted Hamas commanders by Israel. As of February 2025, he ranked fourth on Israel's most-wanted list of al-Qassam leaders, following Marwan Issa, Mohammed Sinwar, and Ra'ad Sa'ad.

Al-Haddad's eldest son and grandson were killed in an airstrike in Gaza City on 17 January 2025. His second son was killed in an airstrike later in April of the same year.

== Assassination ==
On 15 May 2026, al-Haddad was targeted by an Israeli strike on a residential building in Rimal, Gaza City and a vehicle on a street in its vicinity. Reports from Gaza said that at least seven people including three women and a child were killed and at least 50 others were wounded. He was reportedly tracked by Israeli intelligence for over a week before the strike was authorized upon receiving sufficient certainty on his location. The strike, consisting of three fighter jets and 13 munitions, hit an apartment where al-Haddad was likely residing, along with a car that left the area at the same time. Israeli prime minister Benjamin Netanyahu and defense minister Israel Katz confirmed that he was the target, describing him as an architect of the 7 October attacks who rejected the October 2025 Gaza peace plan and Hamas's disarmament, citing his regrouping of Hamas’s armed wing as the reason for the targeted attack. Israeli officials said there were "initial indications" that al-Haddad was killed. On 16 May, al-Haddad's death was confirmed by the IDF and later by Hamas identifying him as a "central figure in directing combat operations". A funeral was held for him, his wife, and his daughter the same day at the Al-Aqsa Martyrs mosque.

=== Reactions ===
The assassination of al-Haddad was condemned by several groups from Iran's network of non-state allies in the Middle East. Iran's Ministry of Foreign Affairs described the killing as a "terrorist assassination" and reaffirmed its support for the Palestinian cause. Hezbollah also condemned the strike, describing it as a "heinous crime" and "treacherous aggression." Hamas described the killing as a "treacherous and cowardly assassination." Former Israeli hostages, including some held by al-Haddad, celebrated the killing. Referring to him, Liri Albag said on social media: "Every dog has its day, and you were a real bitch." Emily Damari and Romi Gonen thanked the security forces involved in al-Haddad's killing.

On 2 July 2026, Hamas announced that it executed a person in Gaza whom it accused of collaborating with Israel and assisting in the assassination of several senior Hamas leaders, including al-Haddad.
