= 2025 Gaza European Hospital strikes =

Israeli airstrikes

2025 Gaza European Hospital strike
- Part of the Gaza war
- Location: Gaza European Hospital, Al-Fukhari, Gaza Strip, Palestine
- Date: 13 May 2025
- Target: Mohammed Sinwar and Muhammad Shabana
- Attack type: Airstrikes, drone strikes
- Deaths: 28+
- Injuries: 40+
- Perpetrator: Israeli Air Force

On 13 May 2025, Israeli airstrikes hit the compound of the Gaza European Hospital in Khan Yunis, Gaza Strip, and the surrounding area, killing Hamas leader Mohammed Sinwar, Rafah Brigade commander Muhammad Shabana and 20+ others. At least 40 more people were injured. The IDF said that the targets were in a militant complex under an area adjacent to the hospital and possibly also under the hospital itself.

== Airstrikes ==
CCTV footage of one of the strikes
- CCTV footage shows the moment an Israeli strike targeted the European Hospital in southern Gaza (via the Associated Press)

On 13 May 2025, at 6:19 p.m., Israeli Air Force (IAF) warplanes simultaneously dropped at least nine bunker busting bombs among dozens of other munitions, hitting the courtyard and surrounding area of the Gaza European Hospital in Khan Yunis, which is one of Gaza's largest medical facilities and houses displaced Palestinians alongside its patients and staff. The IDF said that 50 munitions were dropped in 30 seconds during the attack. It was described by CNN as "some of the largest strikes in Gaza in recent weeks", and was the second fatal Israeli attack that hit a hospital that day, coming after an attack that hit the Nasser Hospital and killed two people. According to a witness, the bombardment "began from all sides of the hospital" and lasted for almost half-an-hour.

The strikes were jointly commanded by the Southern Command and the IAF, with intelligence from the Israel Defense Forces (IDF) and Shin Bet and real-time guidance from Chief of the General Staff Eyal Zamir.

Videos from the scene of the strikes displayed large plumes of smoke over the area. BBC Verify identified at least 13 locations where damage occurred, and reported that two strikes destroyed a road leading to the hospital, and another destroyed a grassy space between two hospital buildings. At least six craters were formed in the area, including at the emergency room entrance and the hospital's access route, causing several vehicles to be buried. The ground collapsed in the area that was struck, suggesting the existence of an underground complex. A witness recalled seeing the ground "split open and swallow people". Major damage was reported to the hospital's entrance, and a witness claimed that every department of the building suffered damage as a result of the attacks. Hospital director Imad al-Hout stated that the strikes disabled the hospital, cut off its water supply, damaged walls and pipes, and led to the evacuation of the majority of the hospital's 200 patients.

World Health Organization staff were stationed at the hospital to evacuate patients, which the IDF was informed about in advance, but WHO received no warning of the attacks, and a bus intended to be used by the organization to transfer patients was damaged.

The IDF did not issue any warnings or evacuation orders, which British barrister Geoffrey Nice said possibly went against international humanitarian law, as hospitals enjoy special protection and must be warned of an incoming attack. Legal expert Lawrence Hill-Cawthorne of the University of Bristol said that even if there was a Hamas complex beneath the hospital, the attacks would only be lawful if sufficient warnings were given to civilians about an impending attack, and the anticipated civilian harm was proportional to the military advantage expected to be achieved by Israel—which he said was "hard to imagine".

Following the initial strikes, the IDF struck the area of the bunker again to prevent the recovery of casualties. Two Palestinian Civil Defence members were injured in a quadcopter drone strike while approaching the hospital. Al Jazeera reported that six further strikes occurred in the hospital area the following day, with one striking a bulldozer in the courtyard.

== Operational details ==
=== Target ===
Shortly after the strikes, the IDF and Shin Bet said in a joint statement that it targeted Hamas militants within a command and control center underneath the hospital. The IDF later released footage that it said to show a tunnel uncovered by the strike, although the video showed footage from the Jenin School, which is adjacent to the hospital. The IDF Spokesperson's Unit said that the tunnel extended to the hospital, without providing evidence. The London-based newspaper Asharq Al-Awsat confirmed that the location had a tunnel, and reported that the attacks hit several of its entrances to ensure the deaths of its occupants, even if they were not directly struck. The tunnel reportedly had a command center and a conference room, which were used by Sinwar to manage Hamas since his brother, Yahya Sinwar, was killed.

At the time of the strikes, Israeli officials privately acknowledged that Hamas leader Mohammed Sinwar was targeted, although the IDF itself did not announce the target's identity until it confirmed Sinwar's death. The Israeli plan to assassinate Sinwar was formed six months prior, but was postponed several times. Sinwar took leadership of the group's military wing after Mohammed Deif was assassinated in July 2024, and became the de facto leader of the group after Yahya Sinwar was killed by Israeli forces in October.

According to The Wall Street Journal, the strikes were conducted during a meeting between top Hamas figures in the tunnel, including Sinwar and the head of its Rafah Brigade, Muhammad Shabana. The meeting discussed ceasefire talks with Israel, and went against the group's security protocols by bringing several high-value officials to one location, making them vulnerable to Israeli attacks.

=== Intelligence ===
Israeli news outlet Walla! reported that the IDF uncovered a "golden piece of information" shortly before the strikes that allowed it to estimate the time that Hamas's military leadership, including Sinwar, would be holding a meeting in the tunnel. The strikes were approved "in real time" by Israeli Prime Minister Benjamin Netanyahu, Defense Minister Israel Katz, and Chief of the General Staff Eyal Zamir, who saw it as an "immediate opportunity" upon discovering that no Israeli hostages were in the area. According to Israel's Channel 12, Sinwar regularly traveled with a "hostage belt" throughout the war to deter Israeli assassination attempts, but for unclear reasons entered the tunnel without an escort of hostages.

=== Tunnel ===
According to the IDF, the tunnel, located 8 metres (26 ft) beneath the hospital, was part of a large underground network that linked Hamas's Khan Yunis and Rafah brigades. It was built by Hamas and contained command and control rooms, weapons, and intelligence equipment. The IDF added that the tunnel was used as a command and control center during the October 7 attacks, and a company commander of the Golani Brigade's reconnaissance unit, identified as Maj. N., stated that it likely held hostages. Troops recovered weapons, ammunition, money, documents, and personal belongings of Sinwar and Shabana, such as ID cards and drivers licenses, while searching the tunnel.

The tunnel was under six feet tall and around two feet wide. Its main chamber, around 20 metres (66 ft) from the hospital's emergency room, displayed Israeli M16 rifles captured during the October 7 attacks as trophies, and further down the tunnel were several more rooms, including a kitchen. The floor of a small room, where Sinwar was said to have been killed, was stained with blood, but was mostly undamaged. The IDF stated that it struck both sides of the hospital complex, blocking off a 20-metre section of the tunnel.

== Further operations in the area ==
In May, the IDF ordered the hospital's staff and patients, and residents in nearby neighborhoods, to evacuate the area. Later, soldiers from Shaldag Unit and the Golani Brigade entered the hospital, before the IDF dug a 10 yards (9.1 m)-deep hole near the emergency room entrance that was used to access the tunnel.

On 7 June, during a joint operation between the IDF and Shin Bet, the IDF released a video that purported to show the tunnel, where the bodies of several militants were discovered.

On 8 June, a group of Israeli and international journalists was given access to the tunnel, including reporters from Deutsche Presse-Agentur, The Times of Israel, The Daily Telegraph, The New York Times, and Ynet. Escorted by heavily armed Israeli soldiers, they were the first Western journalists authorized to enter Gaza in months. An Israeli soldier told The Telegraph that "We had to ventilate it for a few days before allowing anyone down there", due to gases that built up from the dead bodies.

On 17 June, IDF announced that the Golani Brigade's engineering unit, with assistance from Yahalom, had sealed off the tunnel by pouring 250 cubic meters of concrete into it with trucks and cement mixers.

== Casualties ==
The Gaza Health Ministry stated that 28 people were killed in the strikes and dozens were wounded. Among the injured was a freelance journalist who worked for the BBC. According to the Palestinian Civil Defence, bodies were scattered throughout the hospital complex, hampering recovery operations. The casualties were taken to the Nasser Hospital, where medical staff struggled to deal with them.

=== Hamas casualties ===
Hamas initially did not comment on reports that Mohammed Sinwar was killed, but denied that it had military bases in the hospital, instead claiming that Israel sought to put the hospital out of service. On 18 May, Israeli Defense Minister Israel Katz said that Sinwar was likely killed, and Prime Minister Netanyahu made similar claims on 21 May. On 28 May, Netanyahu said that Sinwar was killed during a speech to Knesset lawmakers. On 31 May, the IDF and Shin Bet confirmed that Sinwar was killed in the strike, alongside Shabana and South Khan Younis Battalion commander Mahdi Quara.

Citing "sources from Gaza-based factions," Asharq Al-Awsat reported that "the location did in fact contain a tunnel system previously damaged in the 2014 war." It later reported that Hamas special forces recovered several bodies from the bombed tunnel, including Sinwar, who was temporarily buried in a secret location. All of Sinwar's companions present in the tunnel at the time were also killed, including Shabana, a Rafah Brigade battalion commander, and several field commanders. The report added that Mahdi Kawarea, the commander of the western sector of the Khan Yunis Brigade, was killed while entering or exiting the tunnel. The Saudi channel AlHadath reported the deaths of Sinwar and Shabana according to its own sources, stating that Sinwar's body was recovered alongside ten of his aides. Senior Hamas official Osama Hamdan denied that Sinwar was killed, stating that Hamas members in the Gaza Strip had told him that he was still alive. On 30 August, Hamas confirmed Sinwar's death without providing additional details.

==== Recovery of bodies and cause of death ====
In June, the IDF announced that it uncovered five bodies in the tunnel, including ones that likely belonged to Sinwar and Shabana. Israeli authorities identified Sinwar's body on 8 June through a DNA analysis, where it was tested against Yahya Sinwar's body. The exact cause of death was unclear, though it could have possibly been caused by shockwaves from the explosions, suffocation, or starvation.

== See also ==
- Attacks on health facilities during the Gaza war
- Use of human shields by Hamas
- 2024 Hezbollah headquarters strike
- Killing of Yahya Sinwar
- Hassan Aslih, a Palestinian journalist killed in an Israeli strike on the Nasser Hospital on the same day.
