= Ra'ad Sa'ad =

Palestinian Hamas commander (1972–2025)

- رائد سعد
- Portrait of Sa'ad

Second-in-command of the Al-Qassam Brigades
- In office Unknown – 13 December 2025
- Preceded by: Unknown
- Succeeded by: Unknown

Head of Operations of the Izz al-Din al-Qassam Brigades
- In office Unknown – 13 December 2025
- Preceded by: Unknown
- Succeeded by: Mohammed Odeh

Personal details
- Born: 1972 Gaza Strip
- Died: 13 December 2025 (aged 52–53) Gaza Strip

Military service
- Allegiance: Hamas
- Commands: Al-Qassam Brigades
- Conflict: Gaza war; October 7 attacks; Israeli invasion of Gaza

Ra'ad Sa'ad (Arabic: رائد سعد; 1972 – 13 December 2025) was a Palestinian militant and senior commander in the Al-Qassam Brigades, the military wing of Hamas. Sa'ad joined Hamas in 2005, where he helped to develop the group's military strategy. While removed from his position as head of operations in 2021, Sa'ad was a major contributor to the initial attacks that lead to the Gaza war. After an initial failed assassination attempt in 2024, Israeli forces killed Sa'ad in a drone strike the following year.

== Militant career ==
Sa'ad was born in 1972, and joined Hamas in 2005. He participated in the First and Second Intifadas, and was imprisoned by both Israel and the Palestinian Authority. He was appointed the commander of Hamas's Gaza City brigade in 2005. He was responsible for arms manufacturing and building Hamas's rocket arsenal.

He founded the group's "military academy", and helped develop its military strategy, such as cross-border attacks, artillery usage, and urban warfare. He developed the "Jericho Wall" invasion plan of Israel in response to the construction of an underground barrier on the Gaza border, which intended to deploy almost all of Hamas's 40,000 fighters, although it was dismissed by Hamas as unrealistic.

Prior to the outbreak of the Gaza war, Sa'ad was a political rival to Hamas leader Yahya Sinwar. He backed Nizar Awadallah against Sinwar during the 2021 Gaza political bureau elections, which Awadallah narrowly lost. During the 2021 Israel–Palestine crisis, Sa'ad was removed as Hamas's head of operations due to his perceived poor performance, and he was replaced by Mohammed Sinwar.

Sa'ad was a part of the "inner circle" of Hamas leaders who planned the October 7 attacks, which led to the outbreak of the Gaza war. At the beginning of the war, he was widely identified as No. 4 in the Hamas military hierarchy following Mohammed Deif, Marwan Issa, and Yahya Sinwar. By December 2025, he became Hamas's de facto chief of staff after much of its leadership was killed by Israel, with Israeli intelligence officials considering him the second-most senior Hamas military official. He played a large role in developing and adapting to military strategies and doctrines, such as guerrilla warfare, and was also responsible for replacing slain brigade commanders and training their replacements. He was close to Hamas military leader Izz al-Din al-Haddad, whom he assisted in directing daily military operations.

== Failed assassination attempt ==
On 22 June 2024, the Israeli Air Force executed a major airstrike on Al‑Shati refugee camp, Gaza City, targeting Sa'ad. At least 42 people were reportedly killed by Israeli attacks in the city. No immediate confirmation of Sa'ad's status emerged. Multiple initial reports suggested he was likely killed, but it was later reported that he survived.

== Assassination ==
On 13 December 2025, at 2:49 pm, an Israeli drone strike targeted Sa'ad's car while he was driving on the Al-Rashid road, west of Gaza City, killing five people and injuring at least 25 others, including civilians. Three Hamas members were killed alongside Sa'ad, including his aide and a low-ranking Hamas official. The Jerusalem Post reported that Sa'ad was targeted around an hour after he emerged from a tunnel, in which he had operated for months. The IDF later confirmed his death, saying that he "led Hamas's force buildup" and that his death would significantly hinder the group's efforts to rearm. Israeli prime minister Benjamin Netanyahu and Defense Minister Israel Katz called Sa'ad an architect of the 7 October attacks, and said that his killing was in response to an earlier explosion in southern Gaza that injured two IDF soldiers. On 14 December 2025, Hamas confirmed his death. It also said that he was killed "alongside his brothers who were with him." Khalil al-Hayya, the deputy chairman of the Hamas Political Bureau, stated that the attack is a violation of the ceasefire.

Axios reported that the strike angered US officials, and that the US privately informed Netanyahu that it viewed the killing as a violation of the ceasefire agreement in Gaza.
