= Al-Fukhari =

al-Fukhari
- Municipality type D (Village council)

Arabic transcription(s)
  - Arabic: الفَخّاري
  - Latin: al-Fukhkhari (official) al-Fokhari (unofficial)
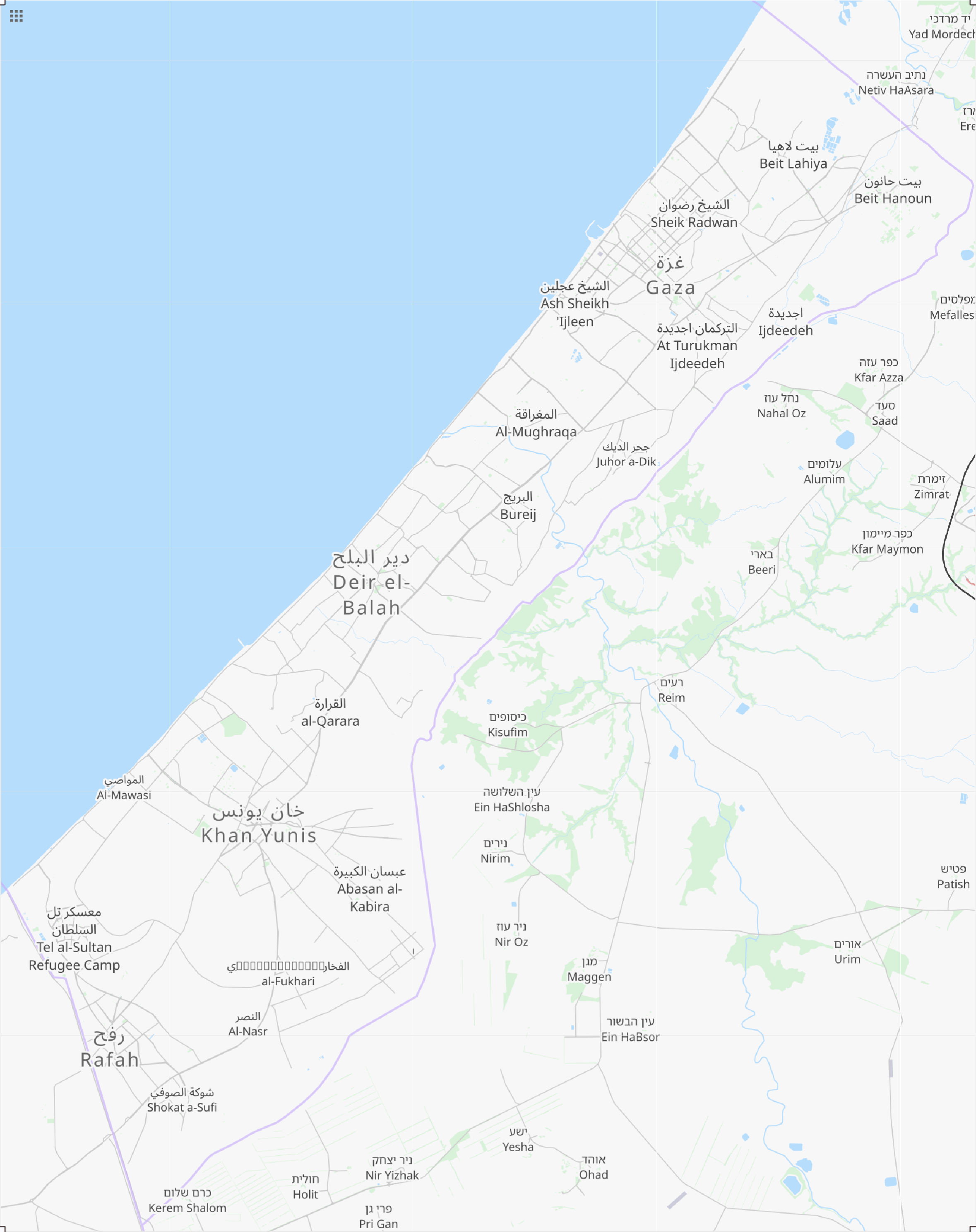
- Location of al-Fukhari within Palestine al-Fukhari (State of Palestine)
- Coordinates: 31°17′55″N 34°19′20″E
- State: State of Palestine
- Governorate: Khan Yunis

Government
  - Type: Village council
  - Head of Municipality: Hasan al-Amouri

Area
  - Total: 4.8 km^{2} (1.9 sq mi)

Population (2017)
  - Total: 6,443
  - Density: 1,300/km^{2} (3,500/sq mi)

Al-Fukhari (Arabic: الفَخّاري, also spelled al-Fokari or al-Fukhkhari) is a Palestinian town in the Khan Yunis Governorate in the southern Gaza Strip, located between Khuza'a and Rafah. It sits on the eastern side of the Sufa Crossing road, just west of the border with Israel.

In the 1997 census by the Palestinian Central Bureau of Statistics (PCBS), it had a population of 2,616, rising to an estimated 6,443 in 2017. During the 2005 Palestinian municipal elections, the Fatah party and Independents won the majority of seats in al-Fukhari's municipal council. The town's mayor is Hasan al-Amouri.

Al-Fukhari's total land area consists of 4,767 dunams of which 37.3% is built-up (overwhelmingly residential) and most of the remainder used for agricultural purposes.

== Effects of Gaza War ==
During Israel's 2008-09 offensive against the Hamas government in the Gaza Strip, 13 houses in al-Fukhari belonging to a total of 85 people, mostly members of the extended Amouri and Eid families, were destroyed by the Israeli Army according to a Human Rights Watch report. The Amouri family claimed that 30 dunams of their olive trees were razed while the Eid family reported that a large part of their 20-dunam wheat farm were flattened by Israeli military vehicles.

Just outside al-Fukhari, the Abu Sita concrete factory and 13 company vehicles were also destroyed. HRW concluded the factory and its equipment had been bulldozed by the Israeli military. The Amouri family stated that there were no militants active in the area at the time of the Israeli incursion and that militants had commandeered their homes previously.
