= Nablus =

Palestinian city in the northern West Bank

Nablus نابلس
- City

Arabic transcription(s)
  - Latin: Nābulus
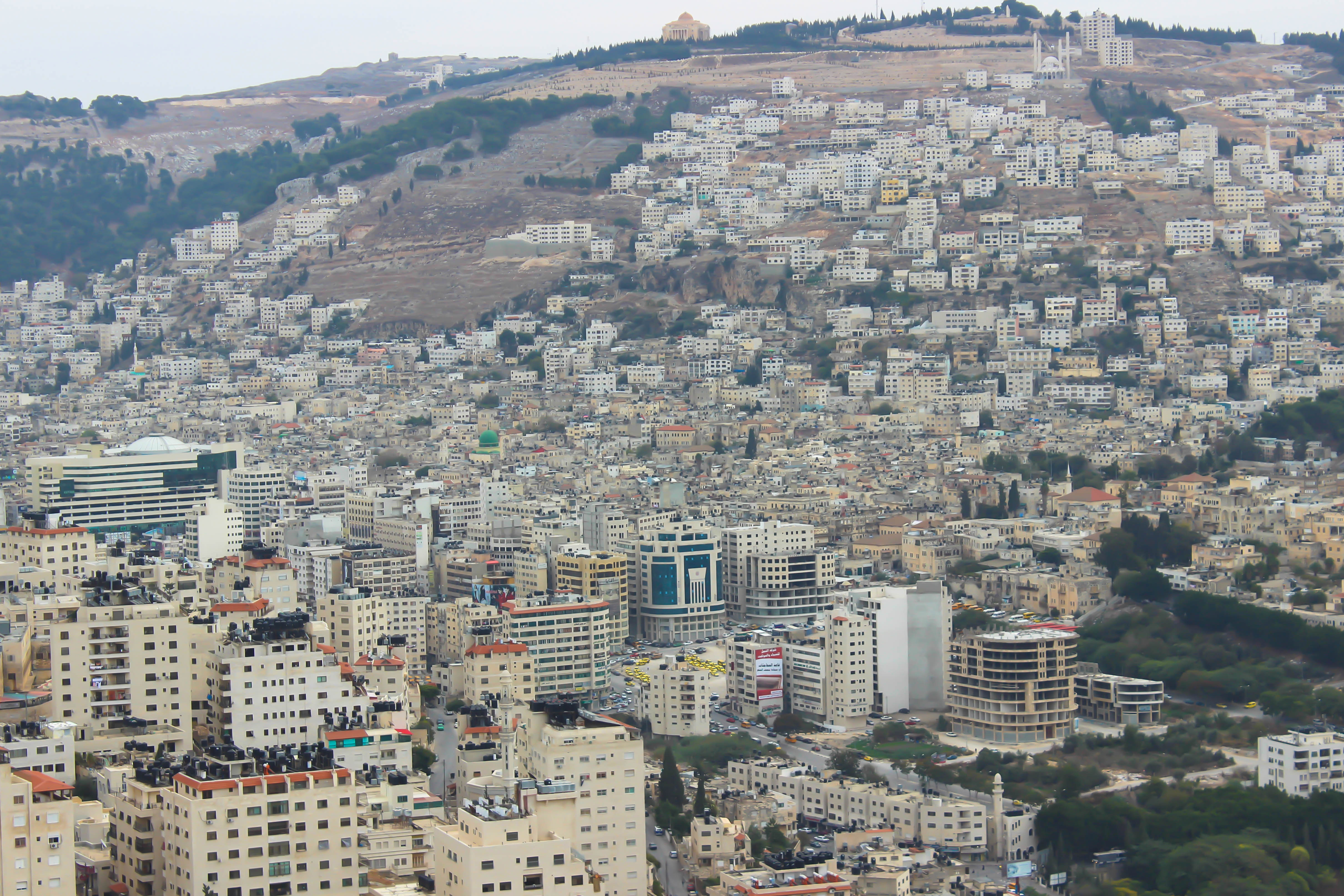
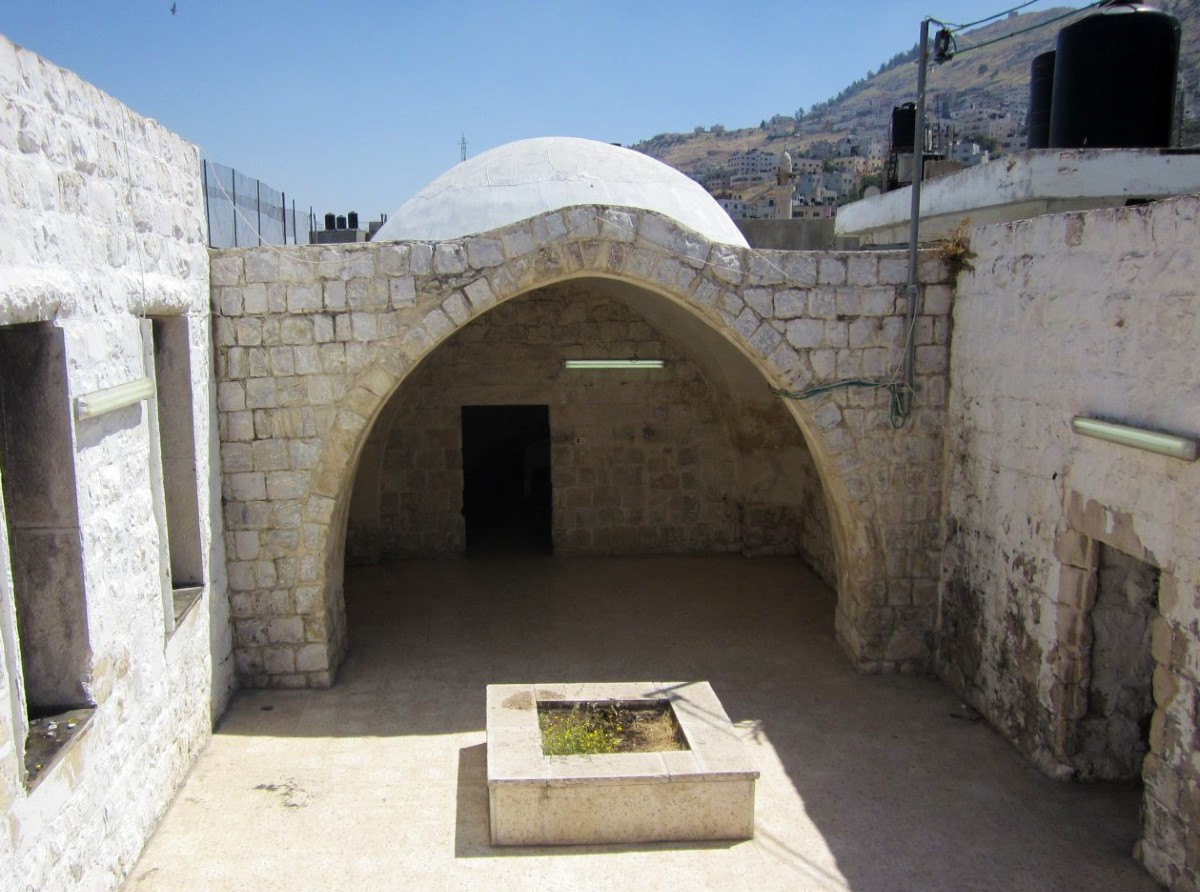
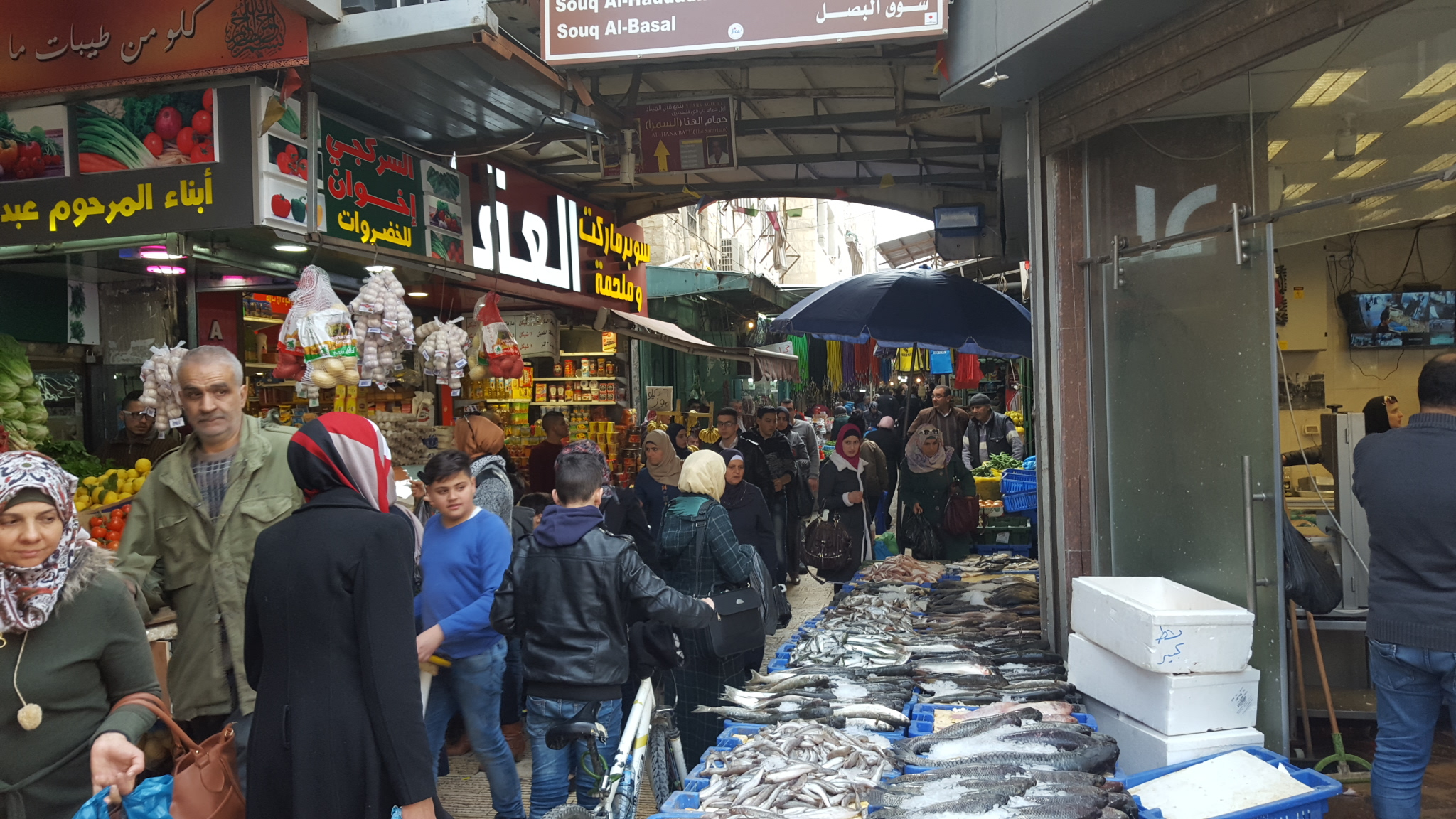
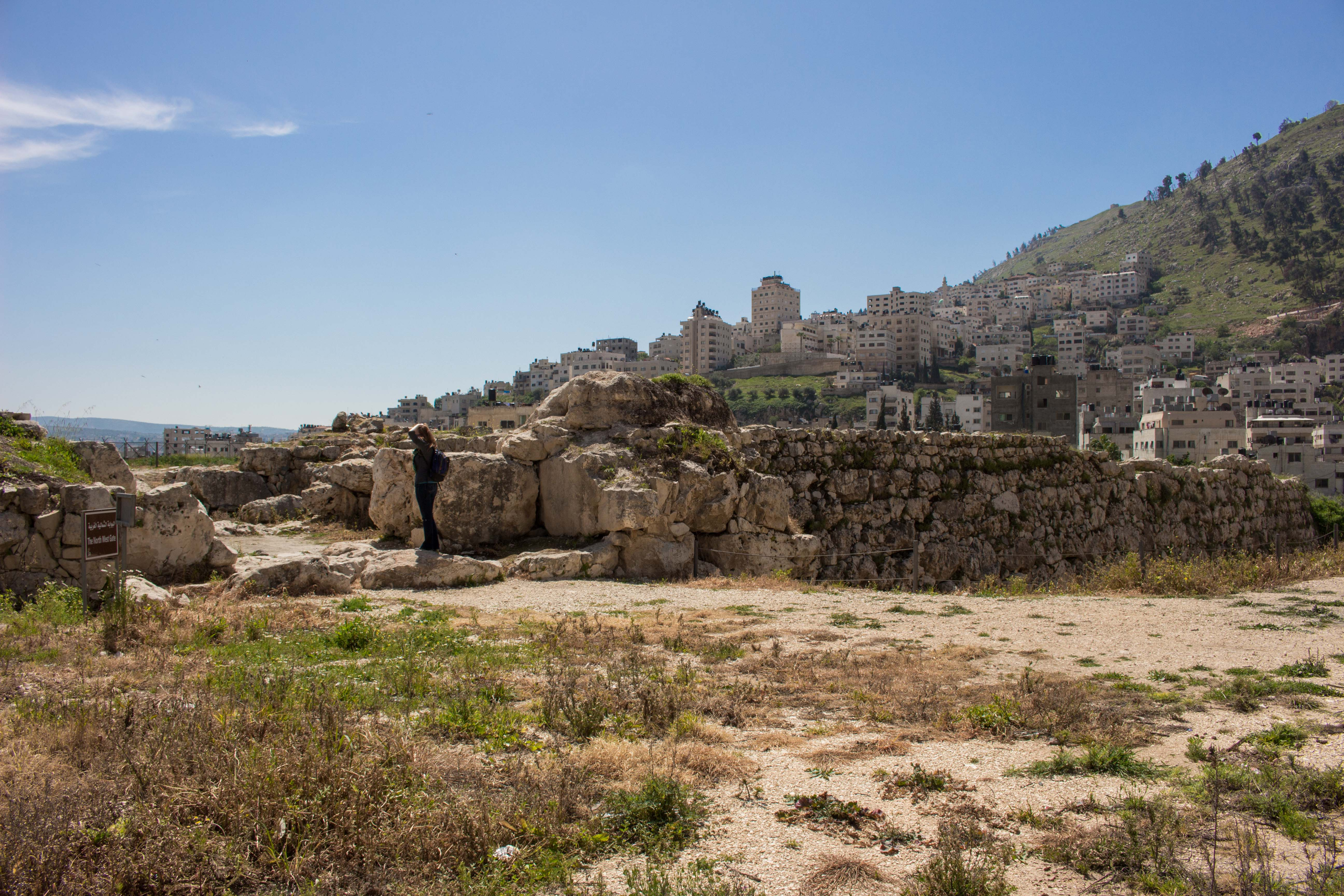
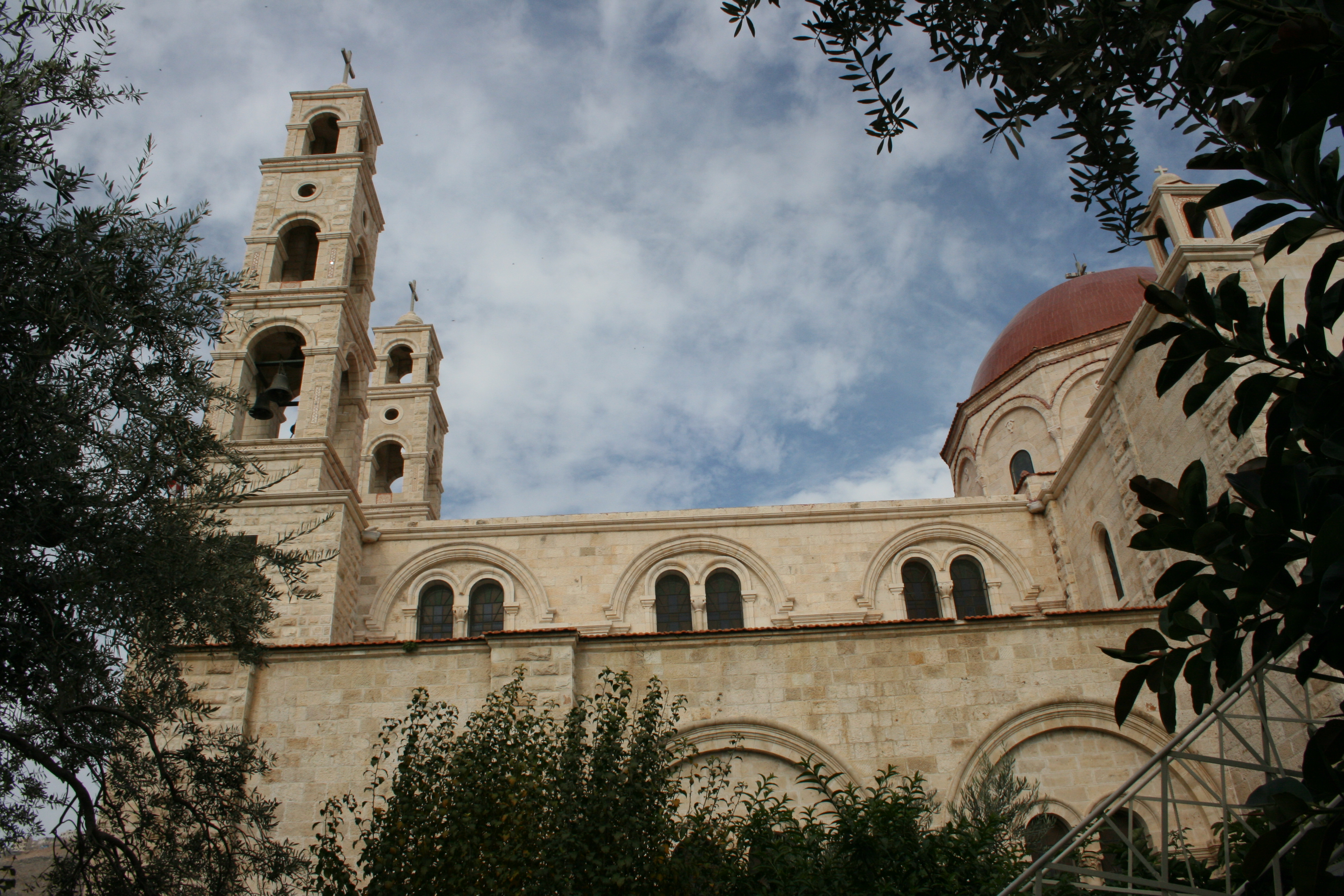
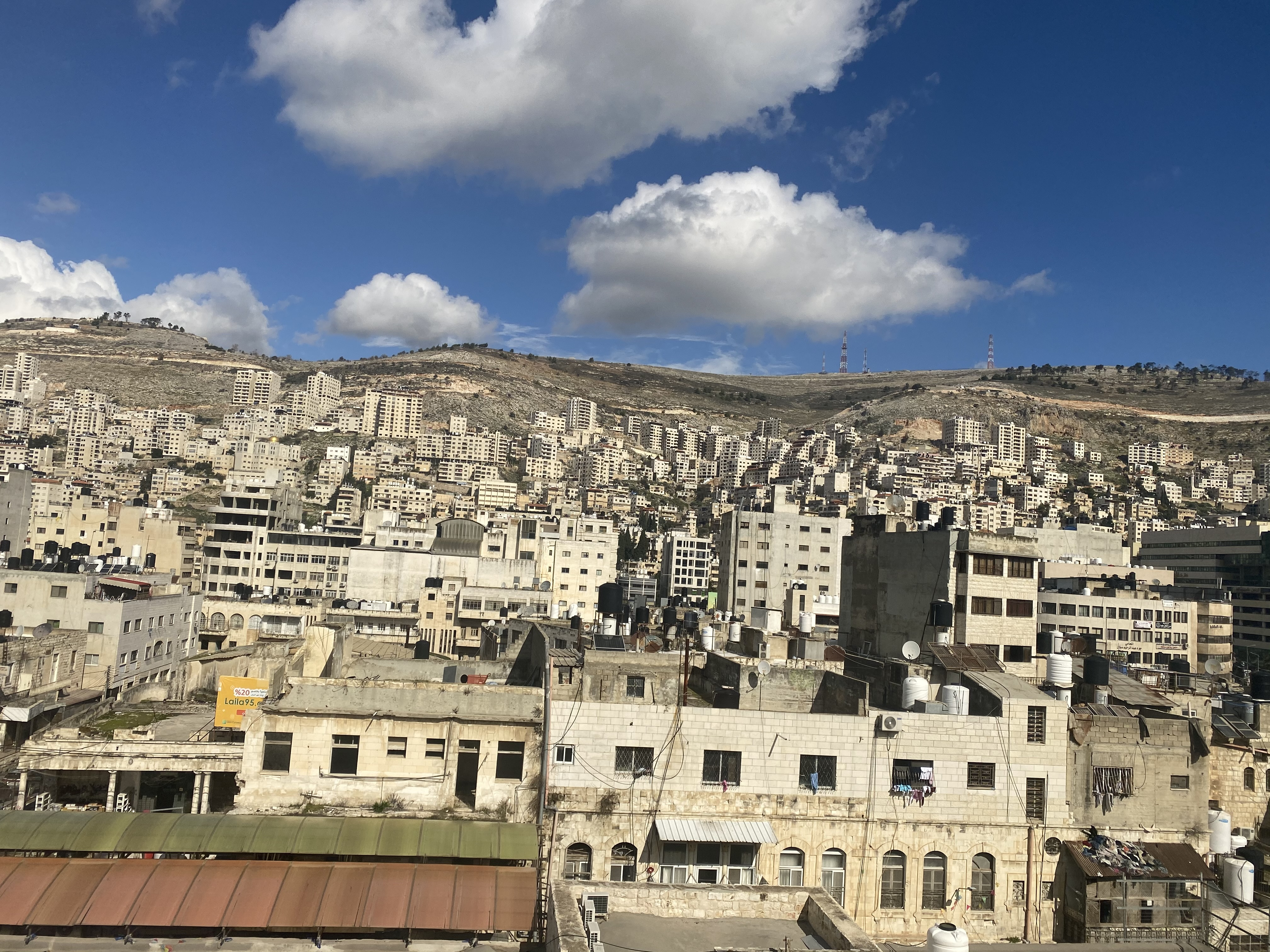
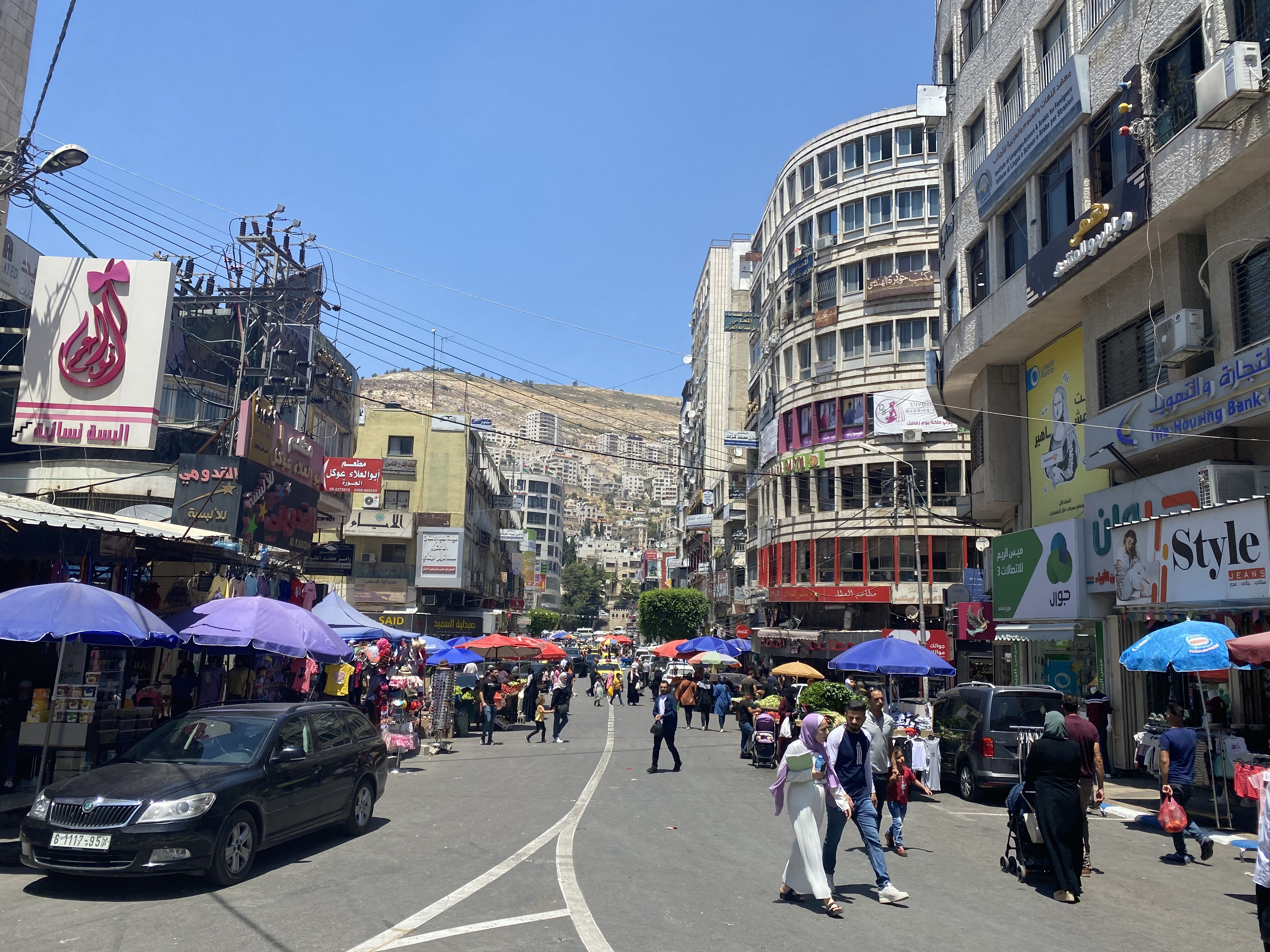
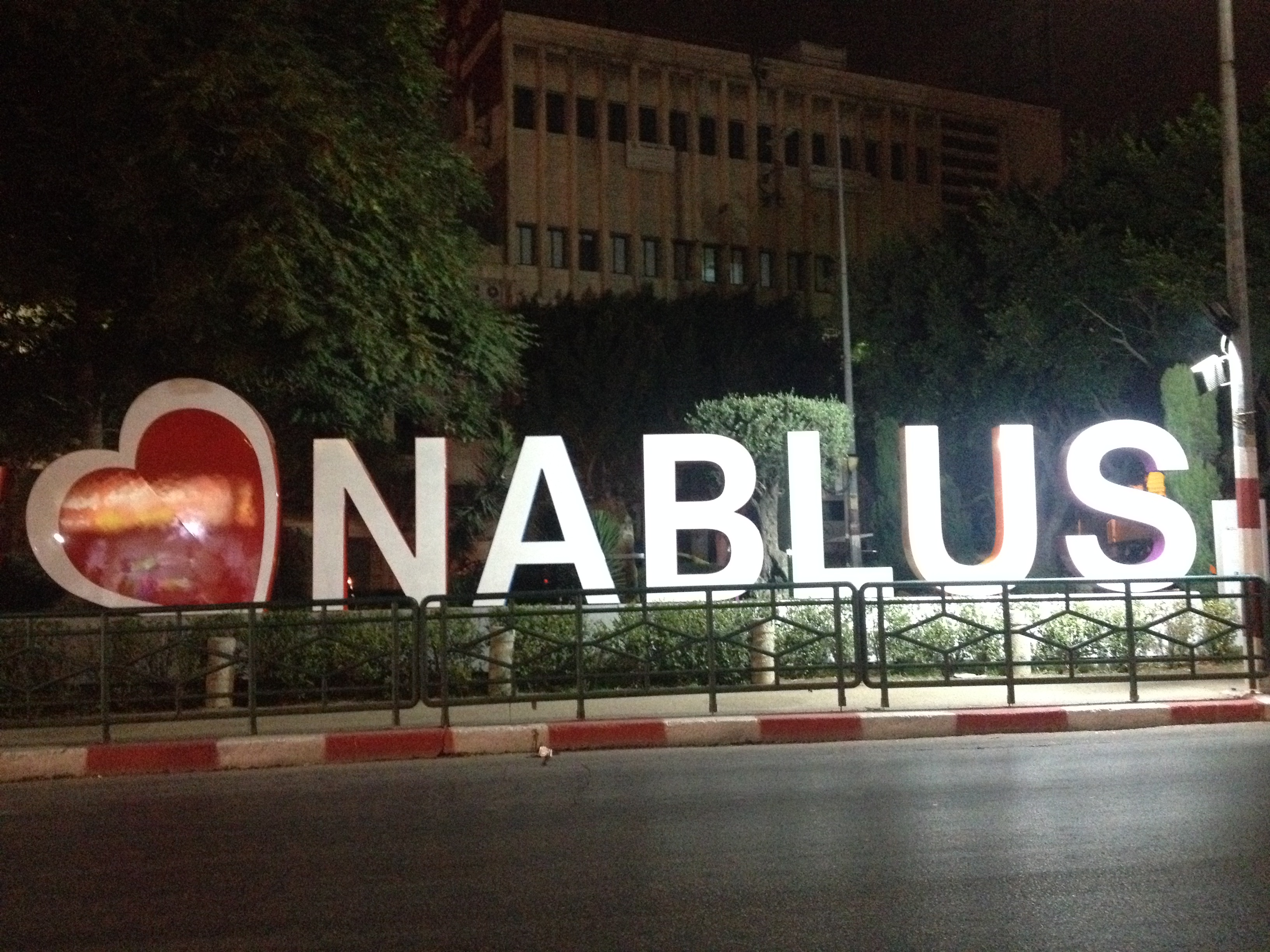
- Left-to-right from top: Nablus and Mount Gerizim skyline; Manara Clock Tower and An-Nasr Mosque; Joseph's Tomb chamber; Old City of Nablus; Tell Balata archaeological site; Eastern Orthodox Church of Bir Ya'qub, where Jacob's Well is located; Mount Ebal; and a Nablus shopping district

- Municipal seal of Nablus
- Interactive map of Nablus
- Location within Palestine Nablus (State of Palestine)
- Coordinates: 32°13′16″N 35°15′39″E
- Palestine grid: 174/180
- Country: Palestine
- Governorate: Nablus Governorate
- Founded: 72 CE

Government
  - Type: Municipality Level A (from 1995)
  - Head of Municipality: Husam Shakhshir

Area
  - City: 28.6 km^{2} (11.0 sq mi)

Population (2023)
  - City: 174,387
  - Density: 6,100/km^{2} (15,800/sq mi)
  - Metro: 431,584
- Website: www.nablus.org

Nablus (Note: English: /ˈnæbləs, ˈnɑːbləs/ NA(H)B-ləs; Arabic: نابلس, romanized: Nābulus, locally [ˈnæːblɪs], derived from the Latin Neapolis, in turn from Ancient Greek Νεάπολις; Hebrew: שכם, romanized: Šəḵem, ISO 259-3: Škem, pronounced [ʃχem]; Samaritan Hebrew: ࠔࠬࠥࠊࠝࠌ, romanized: Šăkēm.) is a city in the West Bank, Palestine, and the capital of the Nablus Governorate. It is located approximately 49 kilometres (30 mi) north of Jerusalem, between Mount Ebal and Mount Gerizim with a population of 156,906. The city is a commercial and cultural centre of Palestine, home to An-Najah National University, one of the largest institutions of higher learning in Palestine, and the Palestine Stock Exchange. Nablus is under the administration of the Palestinian National Authority (PNA).

Nablus has been traditionally associated with the ancient city of Shechem. However, Shechem is now identified with the nearby site of Tell Balata in the Balata al-Balad suburb of the West Bank. The modern name of the city can be traced back to the Roman period, when it was named Flavia Neapolis by Roman emperor Vespasian in 72 CE. During the Byzantine period, conflict between the city's Samaritan and newer Christian inhabitants peaked in the Samaritan revolts that were eventually suppressed by the Byzantines by 573, which greatly reduced the Samaritan population of the city. Following the Muslim conquest of the Levant in the 7th century, the city was given its present-day Arabic name of Nablus. After the First Crusade, the Crusaders drafted the laws of the Kingdom of Jerusalem in the Council of Nablus, and its Christian, Samaritan, and Muslim inhabitants prospered. The city then came under the control of the Ayyubids and the Mamluk Sultanate. Under the Ottoman Turks, who conquered the city in 1517, Nablus served as the administrative and commercial centre for the surrounding area corresponding to the modern-day northern West Bank. Much of Nablus' history is preserved in its Old City, which contains more than 100 monumental buildings.

After the city was captured by British forces during World War I, Nablus was incorporated into Mandatory Palestine in 1922. The 1948 Arab–Israeli War saw the entire West Bank, including Nablus, occupied and annexed by Transjordan. Since the 1967 Arab–Israeli War, the West Bank has been occupied by Israel; since 1995, it has been governed by the Palestinian Authority as part of Area A of the West Bank. Today, the population is predominantly Muslim, with small Christian and Samaritan minorities.

== History ==
=== Classical antiquity ===
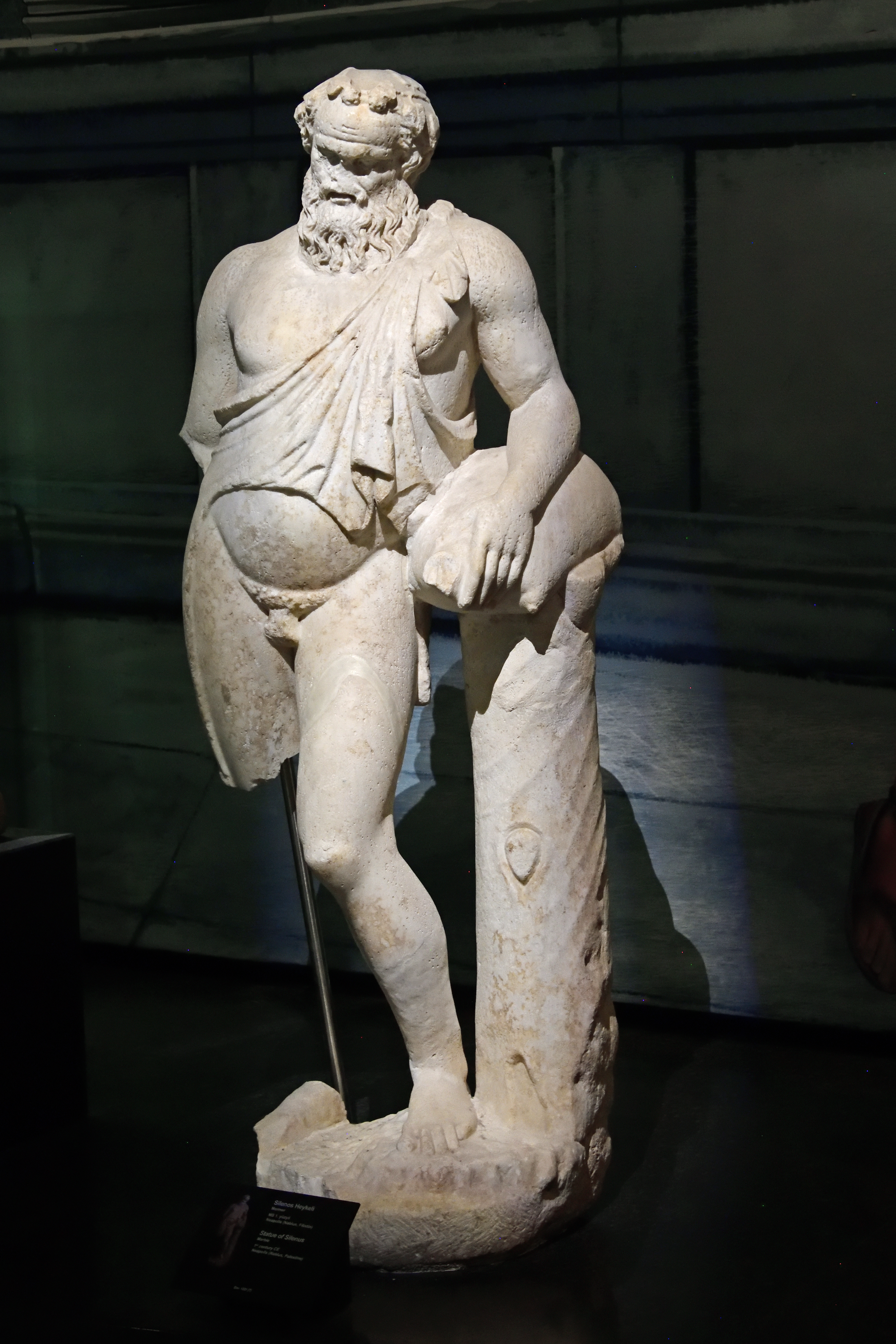
A 1st century CE statue of Silenus discovered in Nablus

Flavia Neapolis ('new city of the emperor Flavius') was named in 72 CE by the Roman emperor Vespasian and applied to an older Samaritan village, variously called Mabartha ('the passage') or Mamorpha. Located between Mount Ebal and Mount Gerizim, the new city lay 2 kilometers (1.2 mi) west of the Biblical city of Shechem which was destroyed by the Romans that same year during the First Jewish–Roman War. Holy places at the site of the city's founding include Joseph's Tomb and Jacob's Well. Because of the city's strategic geographic position and the abundance of water from nearby springs, Neapolis prospered, accumulating extensive territory, including the former Judean toparchy of Acraba.

Insofar as the hilly topography of the site would allow, the city was built on a Roman grid plan and settled with veterans who fought in the victorious legions and other foreign colonists. In the 2nd century CE, Emperor Hadrian built a grand theater in Neapolis that could seat up to 7,000 people. Coins found in Nablus dating to this period depict the Roman temple on Mount Gerizim and gods and goddesses of the Greek pantheon such as Zeus, Artemis, Serapis, and Asklepios, and inscribed with legends in Greek reading "Flavian Neapolis of Syria Palestina" (CΥΡΙΑC ΠΑΛΑΙ or CΥΡΙΑC ΠAΛΑΙCΤΙNHC/ΠAΛΕCΤΙNHC, or abbreviated CΥΡ ΠΑΛ). Neapolis was entirely pagan at this time. Justin Martyr who was born in the city c. 100 CE, came into contact with Platonism, but not with Christians there. The city flourished until the civil war between Septimius Severus and Pescennius Niger in 198–9 CE. Having sided with Niger, who was defeated, the city was temporarily stripped of its legal privileges by Severus, who designated these to Sebastia instead.

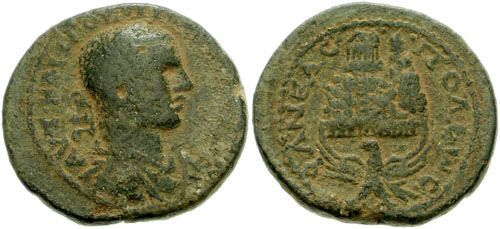
Coin minted in Nablus (Neapolis), in the name of Emperor Volusian, 251–253 CE

In 244 CE, Philip the Arab transformed Flavius Neapolis into a Roman colony named Julia Neapolis. It retained this status until the rule of Trebonianus Gallus in 251 CE. The Encyclopaedia Judaica speculates that Christianity was dominant in the 2nd or 3rd century, with some sources positing a later date of 480 CE. It is known for certain that a bishop from Nablus participated in the Council of Nicaea in 325 CE. The presence of Samaritans in the city is attested to in literary and epigraphic evidence dating to the 4th century CE. As yet, there is no evidence attesting to a Jewish presence in ancient Neapolis.

Si'on suggested that Neapolis was about 900 acres (360 ha) in size during the Byzantine period, making it three times larger than it was when it was first established as a Roman colony. Magen estimates that around 20,000 people lived there during this period.

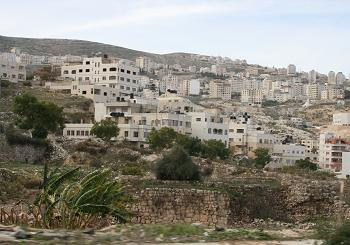
Ruins from antiquity (foreground) in a residential area in Nablus, 2008

Conflict among the Christian population of Neapolis emerged in 451. By this time, Neapolis was within the Palaestina Prima province under the rule of the Byzantine Empire. The tension was a result of Monophysite Christian attempts to prevent the return of the Patriarch of Jerusalem, Juvenal, to his episcopal see. However, the conflict did not grow into civil strife.

As tensions among the Christians of Neapolis decreased, tensions between the Christian community and the Samaritans grew dramatically. In 484, the city became the site of a deadly encounter between the two groups, provoked by rumors that the Christians intended to transfer the remains of Aaron's sons and grandsons Eleazar, Ithamar and Phinehas. Samaritans reacted by entering the cathedral of Neapolis, killing the Christians inside and severing the fingers of the bishop Terebinthus. Terebinthus then fled to Constantinople, requesting an army garrison to prevent further attacks. As a result of the revolt, the Byzantine emperor Zeno erected a church dedicated to Mary on Mount Gerizim. He also forbade the Samaritans to travel to the mountain to celebrate their religious ceremonies, and expropriated their synagogue there. These actions by the emperor fueled Samaritan anger towards the Christians further.

Thus, the Samaritans rebelled again under the rule of emperor Anastasius I, reoccupying Mount Gerizim, which was subsequently reconquered by the Byzantine governor of Edessa, Procopius. A third Samaritan revolt which took place under the leadership of Julianus ben Sabar in 529 was perhaps the most violent. Neapolis' bishop Ammonas was murdered and the city's priests were hacked into pieces and then burned together with the relics of saints. The forces of Emperor Justinian I were sent in to quell the revolt, which ended with the slaughter of the majority of the Samaritan population in the city.

=== Early Muslim period ===
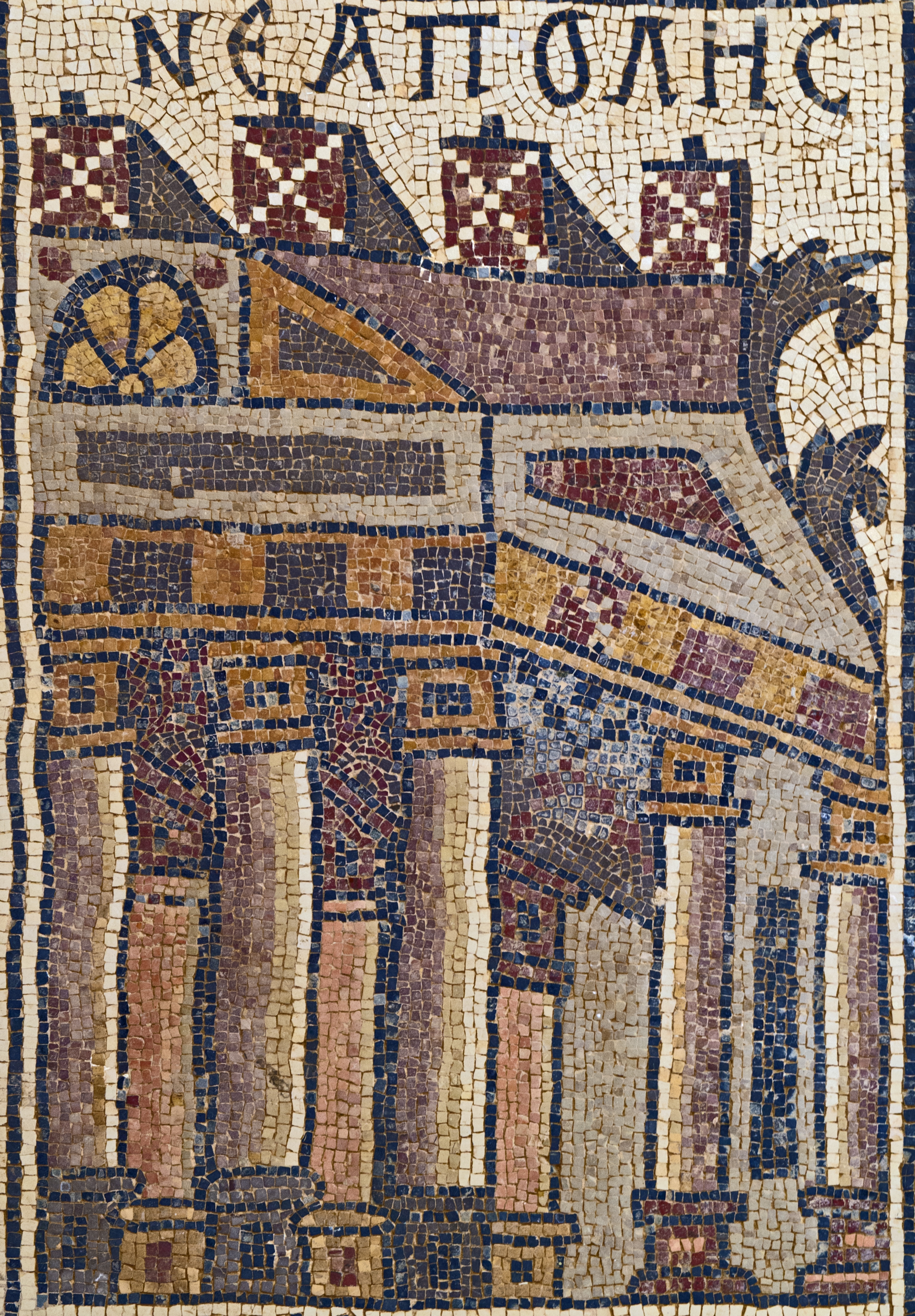
Depiction of Nablus (Neapolis) in the Umm ar-Rasas mosaics, 8th century CE

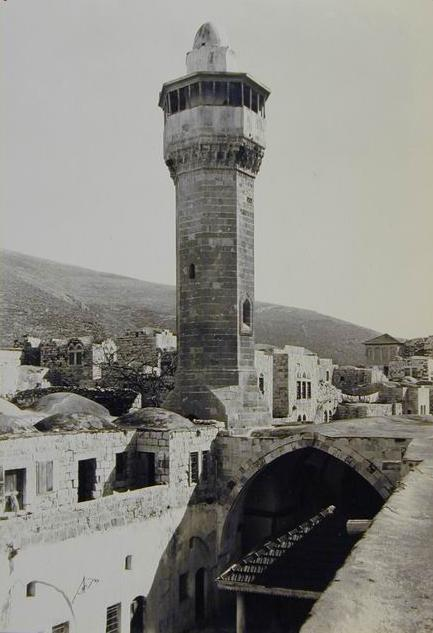
Minaret and entrance of 10th-century Great Mosque of Nablus, 1908

Neapolis, along with most of Palestine, was conquered by the Muslims under Khalid ibn al-Walid, a general of the Rashidun army of Umar ibn al-Khattab, in 636 after the Battle of Yarmouk. The city's name was retained in its Arabicized form, Nabulus. The town prevailed as an important trade center during the centuries of Islamic Arab rule under the Umayyad, Abbasid and Fatimid dynasties.

Under Muslim rule, Nablus contained a diverse population of Arabs and Persians, Muslims, Samaritans, Christians and Jews. In the 9th century CE, Al-Yaqubi reported that Nablus had a mixed population of Arabs, Ajam (Non-Arabs), and Samaritans. In the 10th century, the Arab geographer al-Muqaddasi, described it as abundant of olive trees, with a large marketplace, a finely paved Great Mosque, houses built of stone, a stream running through the center of the city, and notable mills. He also noted that it was nicknamed "Little Damascus," a description still used today perhaps in part because for centuries under later Ottoman rule it formed part of the Damascus Vilayet and there are longstanding cultural and familial ties between the two cities. At the time, the linen produced in Nablus was well known throughout the Old World.

=== Crusader period ===
The city was captured by Crusaders in 1099, under the command of Prince Tancred, and renamed Naples. Though the Crusaders extorted many supplies from the population for their troops who were en route to Jerusalem, they did not sack the city, presumably because of the large Christian population there. Nablus became part of the royal domain of the Kingdom of Jerusalem. The Muslim, Eastern Orthodox Christian, and Samaritan populations remained in the city and were joined by some Crusaders who settled therein to take advantage of the city's abundant resources. In 1120, the Crusaders convened the Council of Nablus out of which was issued the first written laws for the kingdom. They converted the Samaritan synagogue in Nablus into a church. The Samaritan community built a new synagogue in the 1130s. In 1137, Arab and Turkish troops stationed in Damascus raided Nablus, killing many Christians and burning down the city's churches. However, they were unsuccessful in retaking the city. Queen Melisende of Jerusalem resided in Nablus from 1150 to 1161, after she was granted control over the city in order to resolve a dispute with her son Baldwin III. Crusaders began building Christian institutions in Nablus, including a church dedicated to the Passion and Resurrection of Jesus, and in 1170 they erected a hospice for pilgrims.

=== Ayyubid and Mamluk rule ===
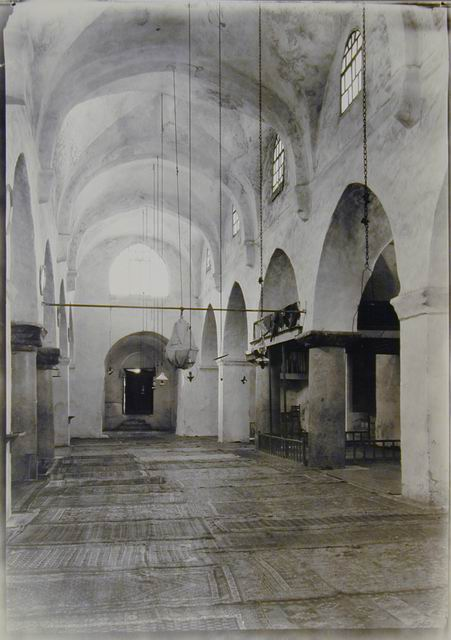
Interior view of the An-Nasr Mosque, converted from a Crusader church to a mosque in the 13th century

Crusader rule came to an end in 1187, when the Ayyubids led by Saladin captured the city. According to a liturgical manuscript in Syriac, Latin Christians fled Nablus, but the original Eastern Orthodox Christian inhabitants remained. Syrian geographer Yaqut al-Hamawi (1179–1229), wrote that Ayyubid Nablus was a "celebrated city in Filastin (Palestine)... having wide lands and a fine district." He also mentions the large Samaritan population in the city. After its recapture by the Muslims, the Great Mosque of Nablus, which had become a church under Crusader rule, was restored as a mosque by the Ayyubids, who also built a mausoleum in the old city.

In October 1242, Nablus was raided by the Knights Templar. This was the conclusion of the 1242 campaign season in which the Templars had joined forces with the Ayyubid emir of Kerak, An-Nasir Dawud, against the Mamluks. The Templars raided Nablus in revenge for a previous massacre of Christians by their erstwhile ally An-Nasir Dawud. The attack is reported as a particularly bloody affair lasting for three days, during which the Mosque was burned and many residents of the city, Christians alongside Muslims, were killed or sold in the slave markets of Acre. The successful raid was widely publicized by the Templars in Europe; it is thought to be depicted in a late 13th-century fresco in the Templar church of San Bevignate, Perugia.

The Samaritan synagogue, built in 362 by the high priest Akbon, and later converted into a church by the Crusaders, was converted into al-Khadra Mosque in 1244. Two other Crusader churches became the An-Nasr Mosque and al-Masakim Mosque during that century.

The Mamluk dynasty gained control of Nablus in 1260 and during their reign, they built numerous mosques and schools. Under Mamluk rule, Nablus possessed running water, many hammams and exported olive oil and soap to Egypt, Syria, the Hejaz, several Mediterranean islands, and the Arabian Desert. The city's olive oil was also used in the Umayyad Mosque in Damascus. Ibn Battuta, the Arab explorer, visited Nablus in 1355, and described it as a city "full of trees and streams and full of olives." He noted that the city grew and exported carob jam to Cairo and Damascus.

=== Ottoman era ===
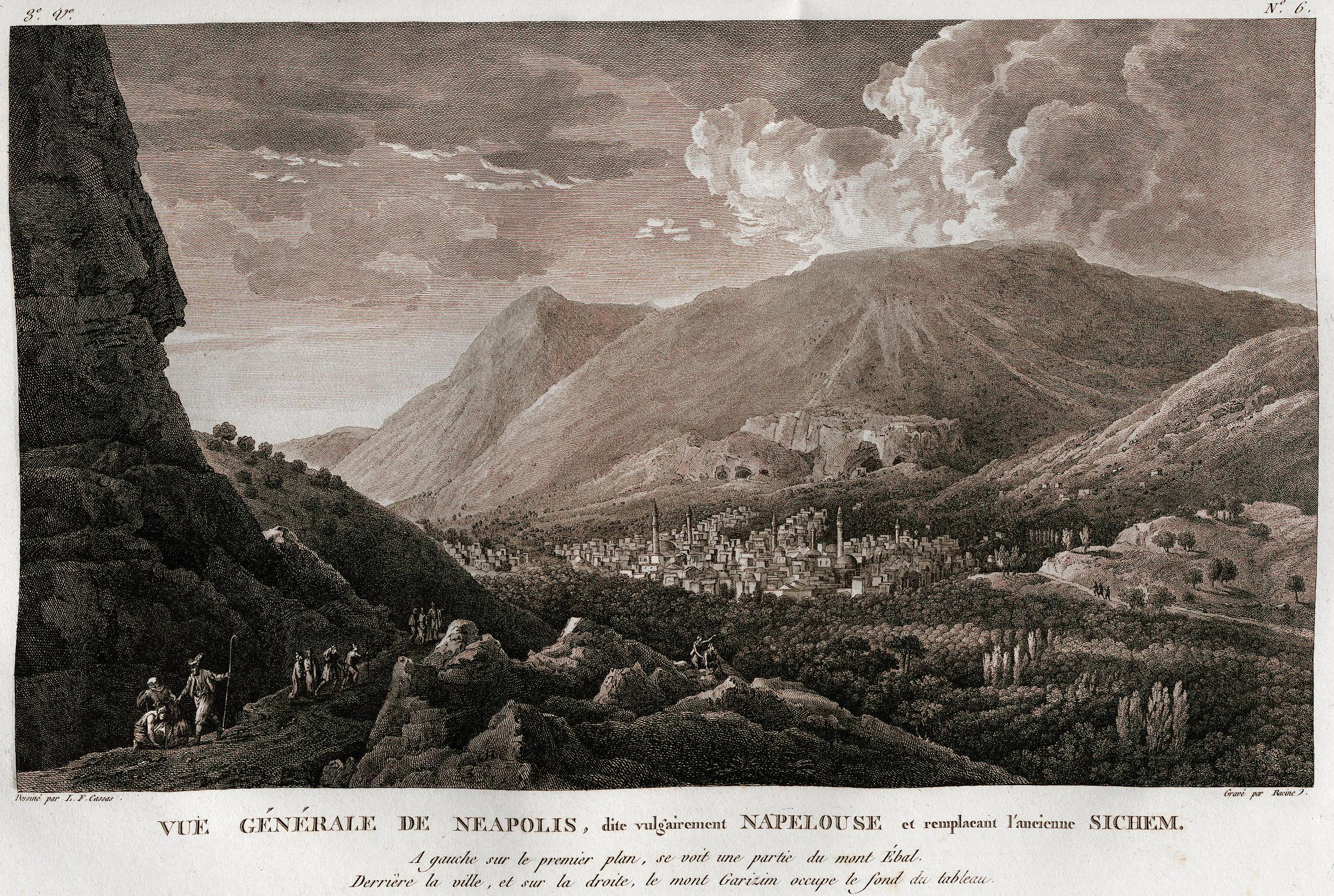
Nablus in the 1780s, by Louis-François Cassas

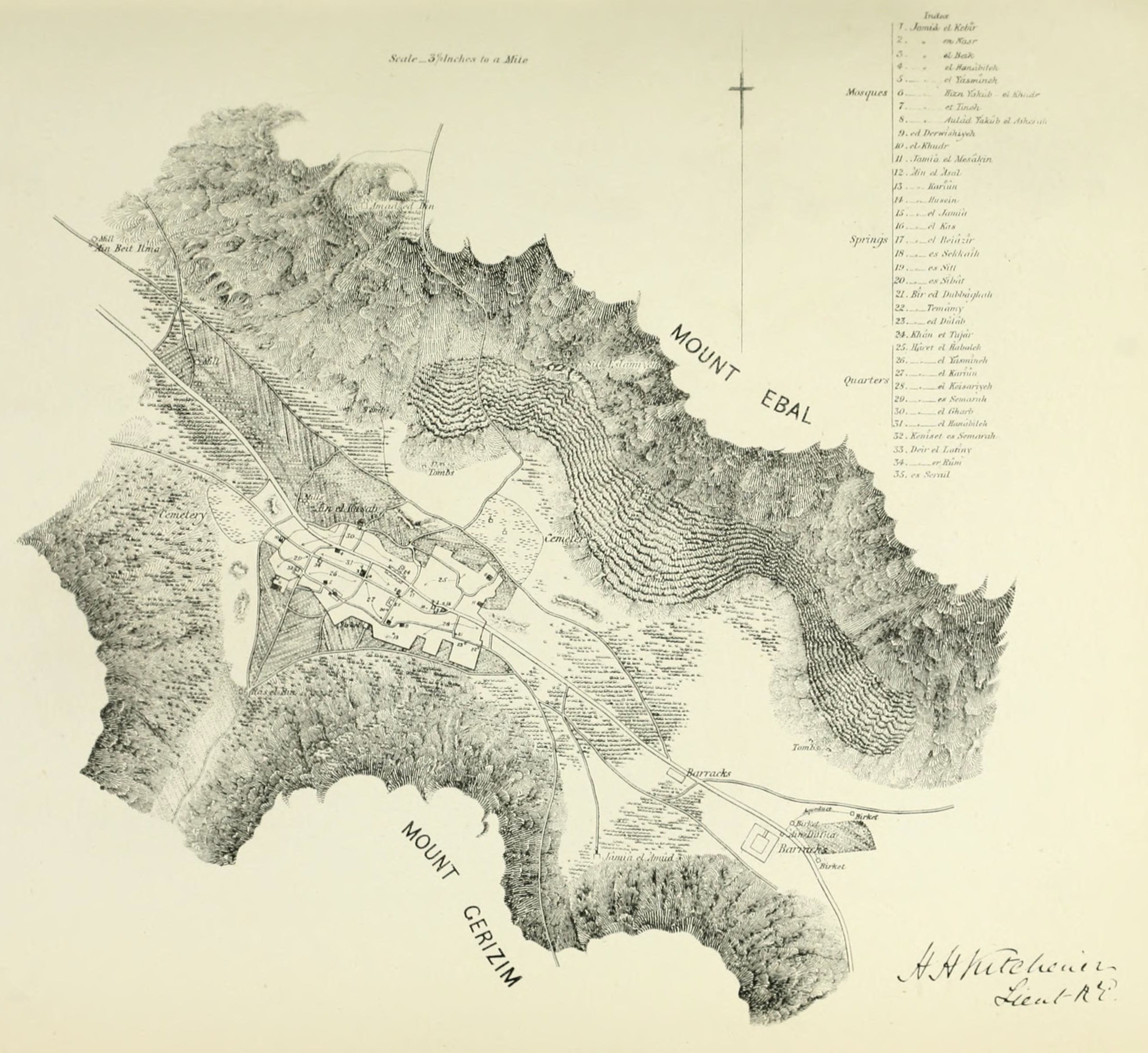
Nablus from the 1871–1877 PEF Survey of Palestine

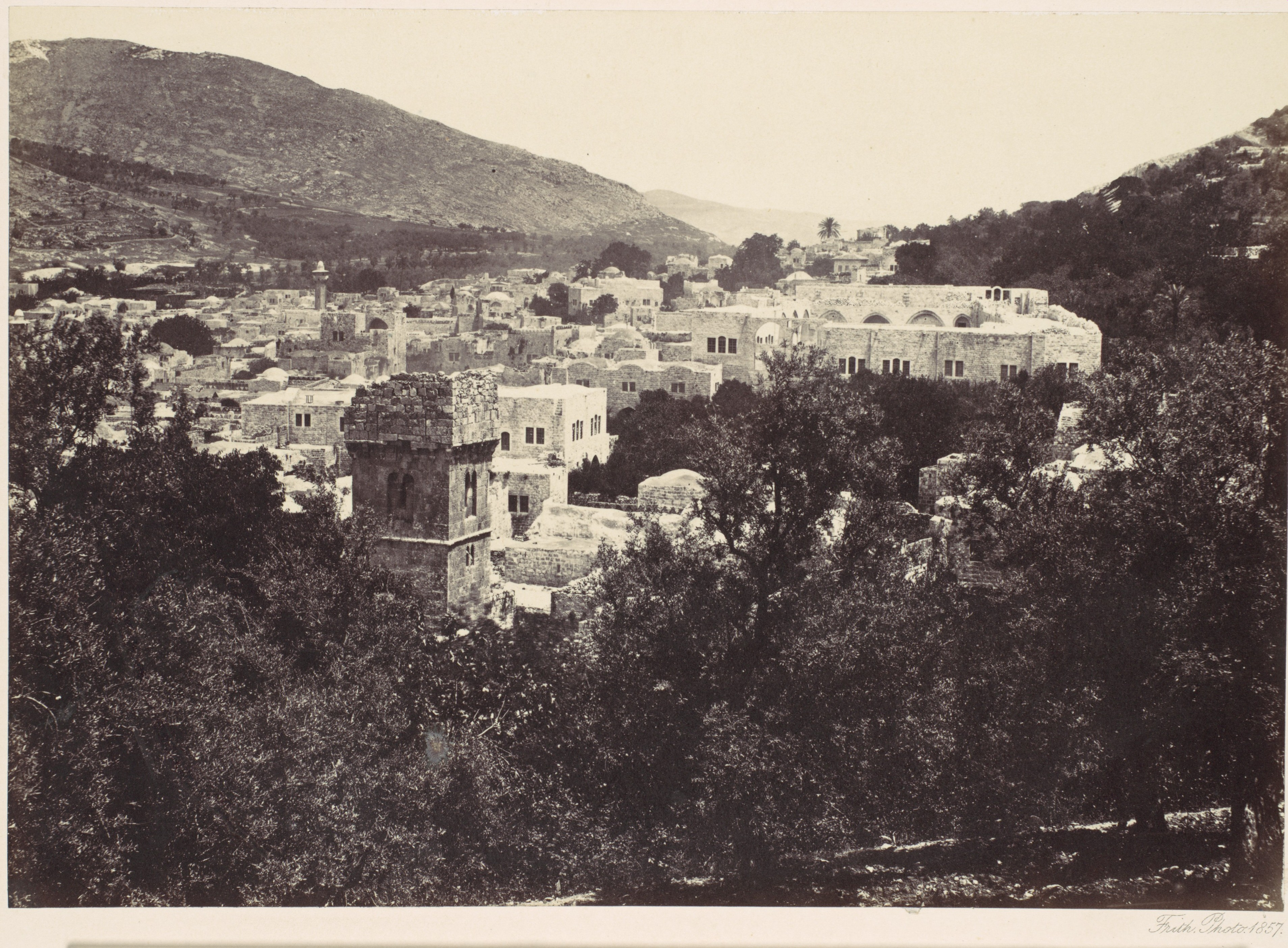
Nablus in 1857, photo by Francis Frith

Nablus came under the rule of the Ottoman Empire in 1517, along with the whole of Palestine. The Ottomans divided Palestine into six sanjaks ('districts'): Safad, Jenin, Jerusalem, Gaza, Ajlun and Nablus, all of which were part of Ottoman Syria. These five sanjaks were subdistricts of the Vilayet of Damascus. Sanjak Nablus was further subdivided into five nahiya ('subdistricts'), in addition to the city itself. The Ottomans did not attempt to restructure the political configuration of the region on the local level such that the borders of the nahiya were drawn to coincide with the historic strongholds of certain families. Nablus was only one among a number of local centers of power within Jabal Nablus, and its relations with the surrounding villages, such as Beita and Aqraba, were partially mediated by the rural-based chiefs of the nahiya. During the 16th century, the population was predominantly Muslim, with Jewish, Samaritan and Christian minorities.

After decades of upheavals and rebellions mounted by Arab tribes in the Middle East, the Ottomans attempted to reassert centralized control over the Arab vilayets. In 1657, they sent an expeditionary force led mostly by Arab sipahi officers from central Syria to reassert Ottoman authority in Nablus and its hinterland, as part of a broader attempt to established centralized rule throughout the empire at that time. In return for their services, the officers were granted agricultural lands around the villages of Jabal Nablus. The Ottomans, fearing that the new Arab land holders would establish independent bases of power, dispersed the land plots to separate and distant locations within Jabal Nablus to avoid creating contiguous territory controlled by individual clans. Contrary to its centralization purpose, the 1657 campaign allowed the Arab sipahi officers to establish their own increasingly autonomous foothold in Nablus. The officers raised their families there and intermarried with the local notables of the area, namely the ulama and merchant families. Without abandoning their nominal military service, they acquired diverse properties to consolidate their presence and income such as soap and pottery factories, bathhouses, agricultural lands, grain mills and, olive and sesame oil presses.

The most influential military family were the Nimrs, who were originally local governors of Homs and Hama's rural subdistricts. Other officer families included the Akhrami, Asqalan, Bayram, Jawhari, Khammash, Mir'i, Shafi, Sultan and Tamimi families, some of which remained in active service, while some left service for other pursuits. In the years following the 1657 campaign, two other families migrated to Nablus: the Jarrars from Balqa and the Tuqans from northern Syria or Transjordan. The Jarrars came to dominate the hinterland of Nablus, while the Tuqans and Nimrs competed for influence in the town. The former held the post of mutasallim ('tax collector, strongman') of Nablus longer, though non-consecutively than any other family. The three families maintained their power until the mid-19th century.

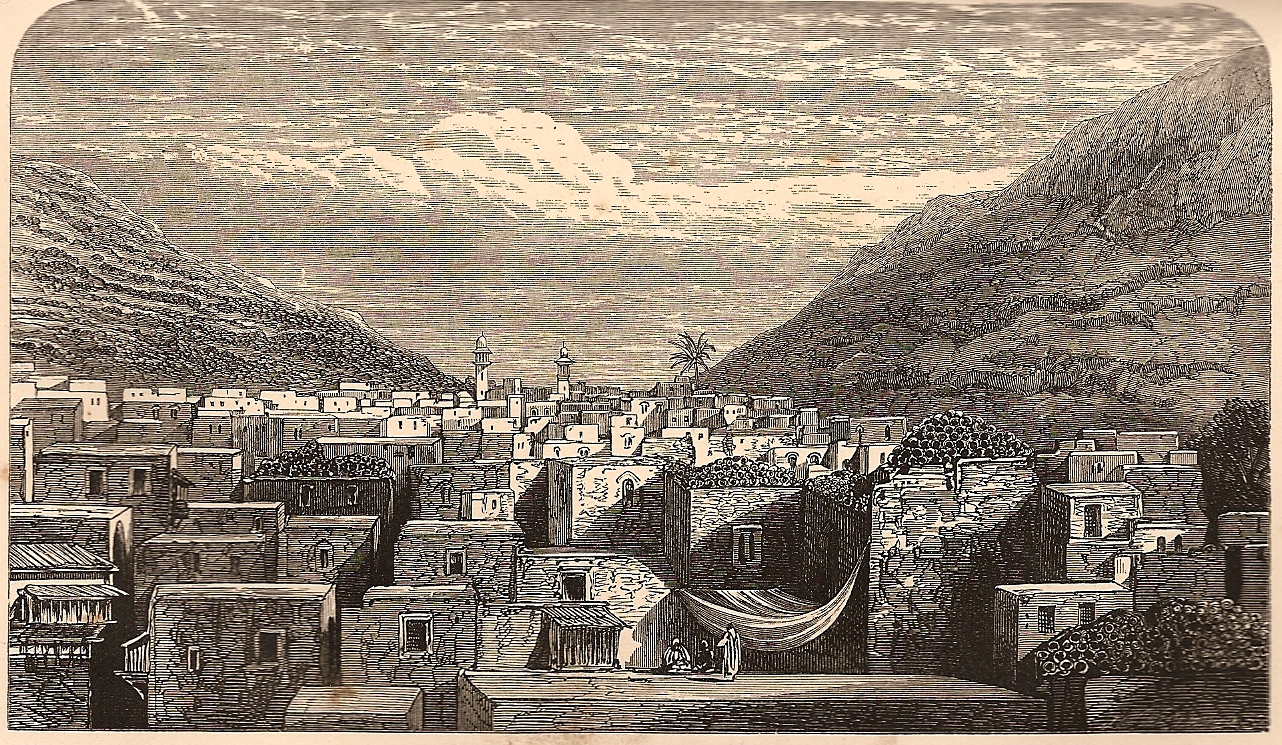
Nablus, by W. C. P. Medlycott, in H. B. Tristram, 1865

In the mid-18th century, Daher al-Umar, the autonomous Arab ruler of the Galilee became a dominant figure in Palestine. To build up his army, he strove to gain a monopoly over the cotton and olive oil trade of the southern Levant, including Jabal Nablus, which was a major producer of both crops. In 1771, during the Egyptian Mamluk invasion of Syria, Daher aligned himself with the Mamluks and besieged Nablus, but did not succeed in taking the city. In 1773, he tried again without success. Nevertheless, from a political perspective, the sieges led to a decline in the importance of the city in favor of Acre. Daher's successor, Jezzar Pasha, maintained Acre's dominance over Nablus. After his reign ended in 1804, Nablus regained its autonomy, and the Tuqans, who represented a principal opposing force, rose to power.

=== Egyptian rule and Ottoman revival ===
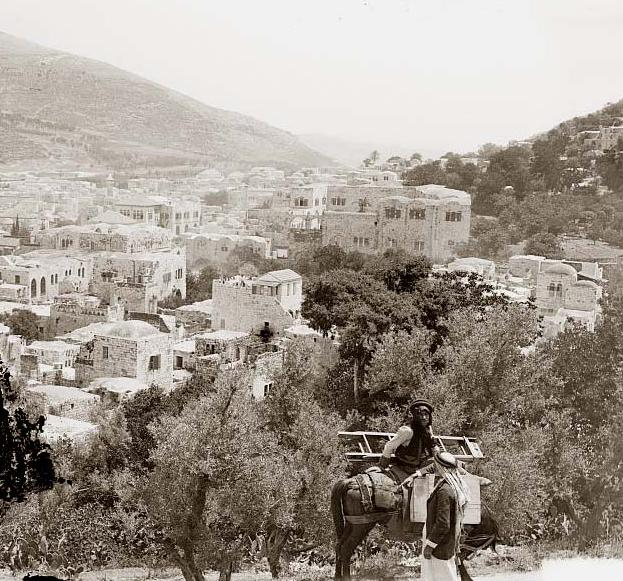
Nablus in 1898

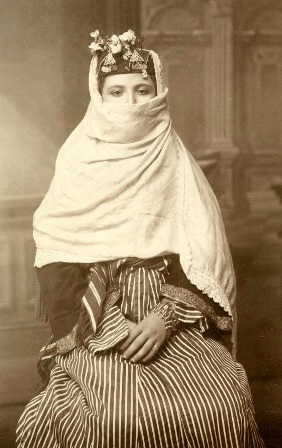
Young woman from Nablus, between 1867 and 1885

In 1831–32 Khedivate Egypt, then led by Muhammad Ali, conquered Palestine from the Ottomans. A policy of conscription and new taxation was instituted which led to a revolt organized by the a'ayan (notables) of Nablus, Hebron and the Jerusalem–Jaffa area. In May 1834, Qasim al-Ahmad—the chief of the Jamma'in nahiya—rallied the rural sheikhs and fellahin (peasants) of Jabal Nablus and launched a revolt against Governor Ibrahim Pasha, in protest at conscription orders, among other new policies. The leaders of Nablus and its hinterland sent thousands of rebels to attack Jerusalem, the center of government authority in Palestine, aided by the Abu Ghosh clan, and they conquered the city on 31 May. However, they were later defeated by Ibrahim Pasha's forces the next month. Ibrahim then forced the heads of the Jabal Nablus clans to leave for nearby villages. By the end of August, the countrywide revolt had been suppressed and Qasim was executed.

Egyptian rule in Palestine resulted in the destruction of Acre and thus, the political importance of Nablus was further elevated. The Ottomans wrested back control of Palestine from Egypt in 1840–41. However, the Arraba-based Abd al-Hadi clan which rose to prominence under Egyptian rule for supporting Ibrahim Pasha, continued its political dominance in Jabal Nablus.

Throughout the 18th and 19th centuries, Nablus was the principal trade and manufacturing center in Ottoman Syria. Its economic activity and regional leadership position surpassed that of Jerusalem and the coastal cities of Jaffa and Acre. Olive oil was the primary product of Nablus and aided other related industries such as soap-making and basket weaving. It was also the largest producer of cotton in the Levant, topping the production of northern cities such as Damascus. Jabal Nablus enjoyed a greater degree of autonomy than other sanjaks under Ottoman control, probably because the city was the capital of a hilly region, in which there were no "foreigners" who held any military or bureaucratic posts. Thus, Nablus remained outside the direct "supervision" of the Ottoman government, according to historian Beshara Doumani.

=== World War I and British Mandate ===
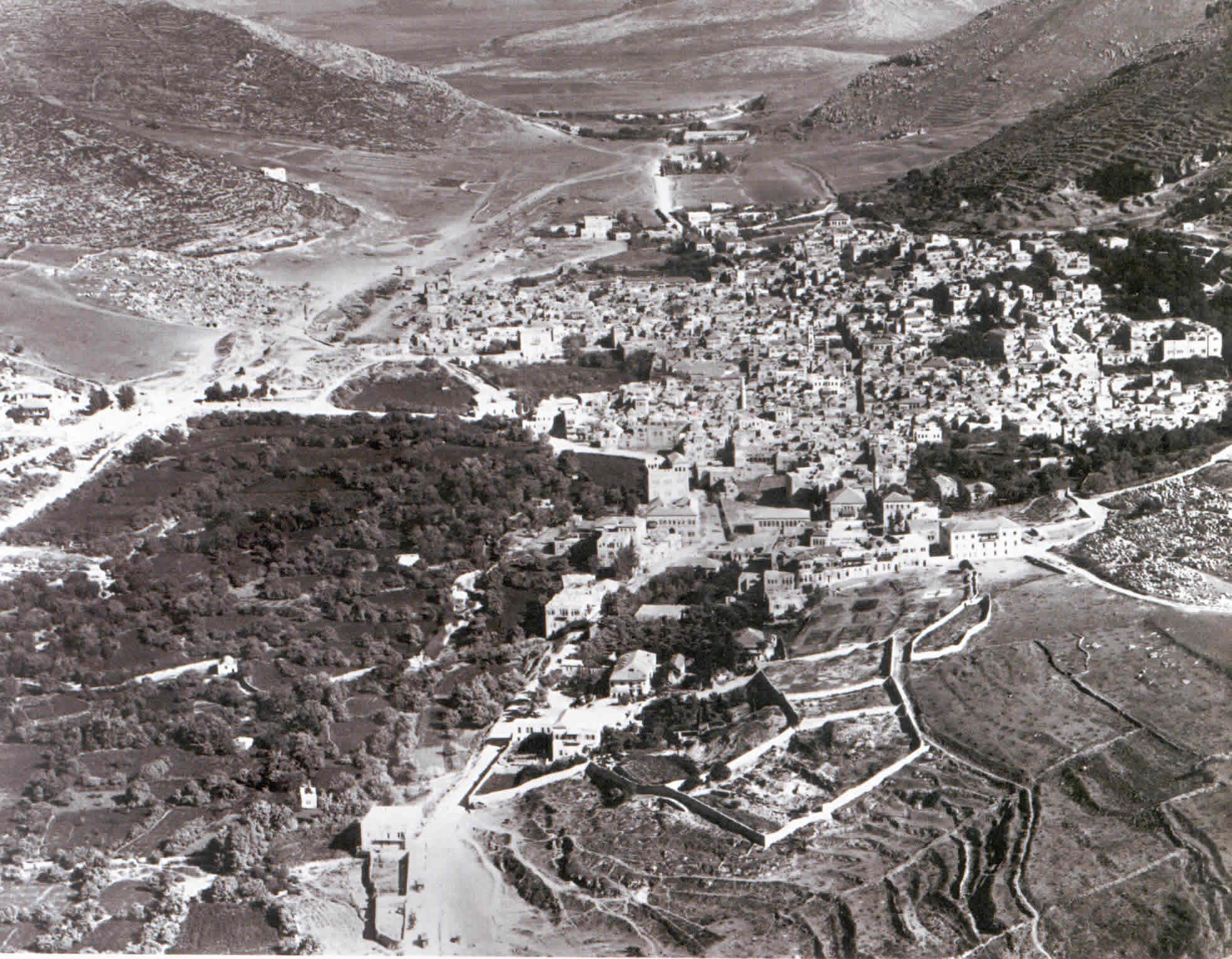
Nablus in 1918

Between 19 and 25 September 1918, in the last months of the Sinai and Palestine Campaign of the First World War the Battle of Nablus took place, together with the Battle of Sharon during the set piece Battle of Megiddo. Fighting took place in the Judean Hills where the British Empire's XX Corps and Royal Flying Corps attacked the Ottoman Empire's Yildirim Army Group's Seventh Army which held a defensive position in front of Nablus, and which the Eighth Army had attempted to retreat to, in vain.

The 1927 Jericho earthquake destroyed many of the Nablus' historic buildings, including the An-Nasr Mosque. Though they were subsequently rebuilt by Haj Amin al-Husayni's Supreme Muslim Council in the mid-1930s, their previous "picturesque" character was lost. During the 1936–1939 Arab revolt in Palestine, the British authorities demolished buildings in the Old City quarter of Qaryun suspected of harboring insurgents or hiding weapons. Jewish immigration did not significantly impact the demographic composition of Nablus, and it was slated for inclusion in the Arab state envisioned by the United Nations General Assembly's 1947 partition plan for Palestine.

=== Jordanian occupation ===
During the 1948 Arab–Israeli War, Nablus came under Jordanian occupation. Thousands of Palestinian refugees displaced from areas captured by Israeli forces arrived in Nablus, settling in refugee camps in and around the city. Its population doubled, and the influx of refugees put a heavy strain on the city's resources. Three such camps are still located within the city limits today: Ein Beit al-Ma', Balata and Askar. During the Jordanian occupation, the adjacent villages of Rafidia, Balata al-Balad, al-Juneid and Askar were annexed to the Nablus municipality. Nablus was occupied and annexed by Jordan in 1950.

=== Israeli period ===
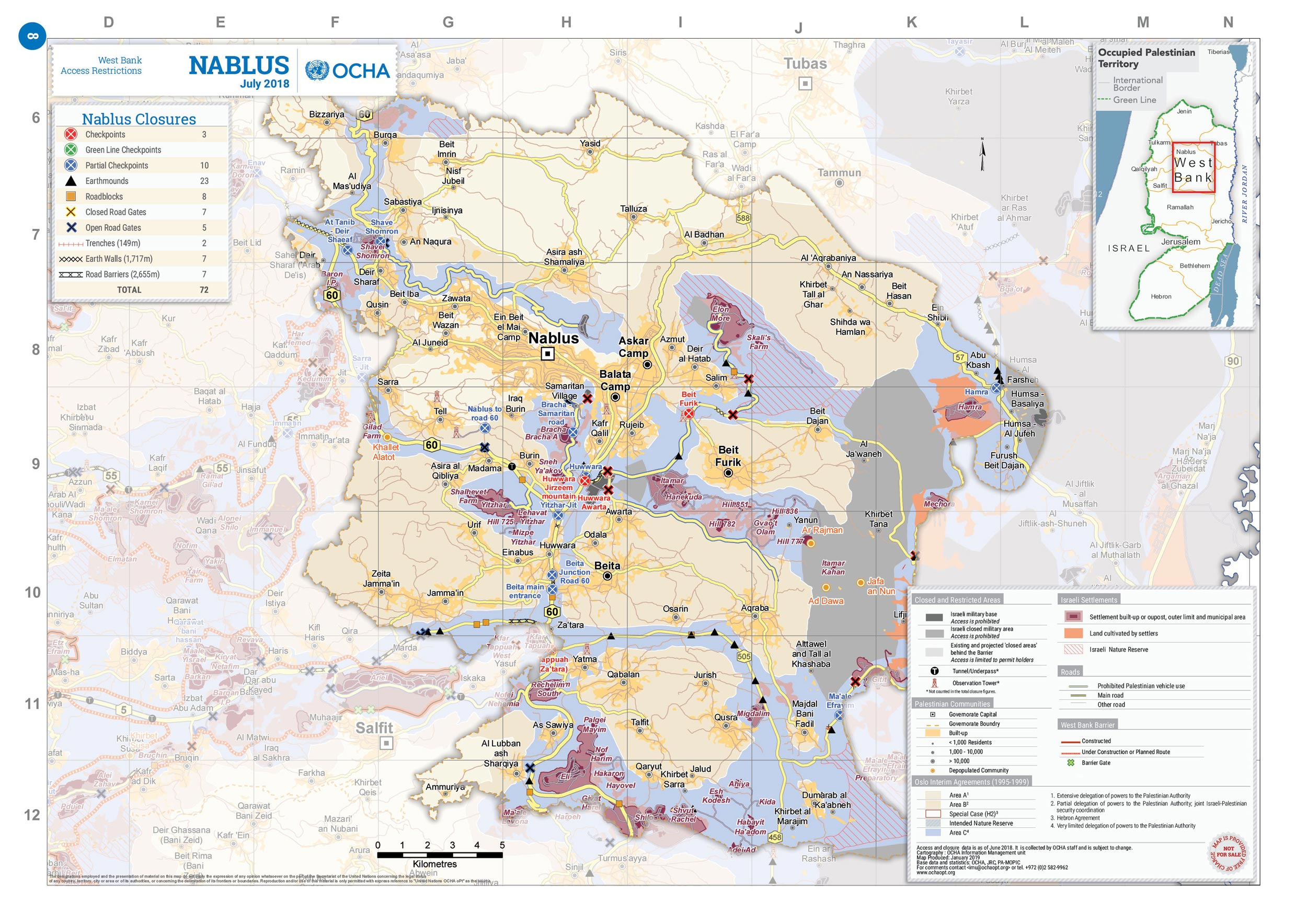
2018 United Nations map of the area, showing the Israeli occupation arrangements.

The Six-Day War ended with the Israeli occupation of Nablus. Many Israeli settlements were built around Nablus during the 1980s and early 1990s. The restrictions placed on Nablus during the First Intifada were met by a back-to-the-land movement to secure self-sufficiency, and had a notable outcome in boosting local agricultural production.

Bassam Shakaa was elected mayor in 1976, and four years later he survived an assassination attempt by the Jewish Underground on 2 June 1980, considered a terrorist group by Israel, which resulted in Shakaa losing both his legs. The Israeli administration removed him from office in the spring of 1982, and installed an army officer who ran the city for the following three and a half years.

In response to the murder of two Israeli teachers on 21 July near Jenin and the killing of another Israeli on 30 July, the Israeli army imposed a 5-day curfew on the city on 29 July 1985 that was lifted 2 hours a day. Najah University was closed for two months for hanging PLO propaganda posters.

The Israeli administration ended in January 1986 with the appointment of Zafer al-Masri as mayor. A popular leader of the Nablus Chamber of Commerce, al-Masri began a program of improvements in the town. Despite maintaining that he would have nothing to do with Israeli autonomy plans, he was assassinated on 2 March 1986, widely believed to be the work of the Popular Front for the Liberation of Palestine.

Salah el Bah'sh was shot with a rubber bullet by an Israeli soldier on 18 June 1989 whilst walking through the Nablus Casbah. Witnesses told B'Tselem that he was shot in the chest at close range after not responding to a soldier shouting "Ta'amod" (Halt!). Bah'sh died and the army indicated that an investigation was being carried out.

=== Palestinian control ===
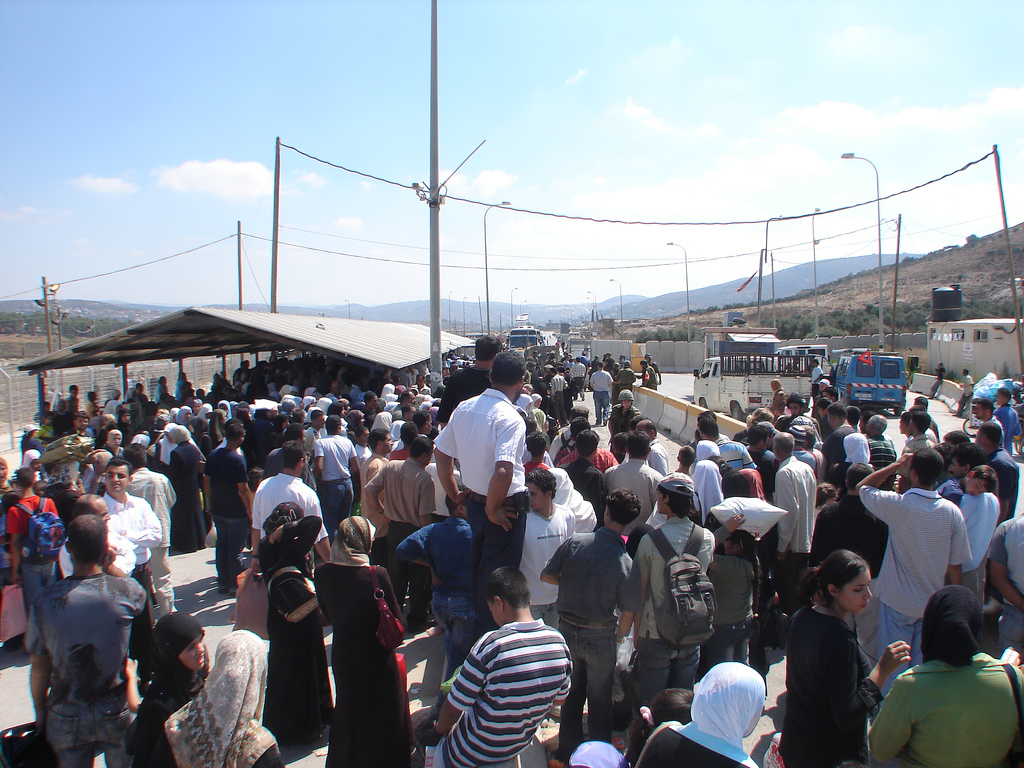
View of Huwwara checkpoint with Palestinians waiting to travel south, 2006

Jurisdiction over the city was handed over to the Palestinian National Authority on 12 December 1995, as a result of the Oslo Accords Interim Agreement on the West Bank and the Gaza Strip. Nablus is neighbored by Israeli settlements, and was site of regular clashes with the Israel Defense Forces (IDF) during the First Intifada when the local prison was known for torture. The city was a hub of Palestinian nationalist activity in the West Bank in the 1990s, and when the Second Intifada began, arsonists of Jewish shrines in Nablus were applauded. After the controversy over the Muhammad cartoons in Jyllands-Posten, published in Denmark in late September 2006, militias kidnapped two foreigners and threatened to kidnap more as a protest. Noa Meir, an Israeli military spokeswoman, said in 2008 that the city remains "capital of terror" of the West Bank.

From the start of the Second Intifada, which began in September 2000, Nablus became a flash-point of clashes between the IDF and Palestinians. The city has a tradition of political activism, as evinced by its nickname, jabal al-nar (mountain of fire) and, located between two mountains, was closed off at both ends of the valley by Israeli checkpoints. For several years, movements in and out of the city were highly restricted. Nablus produced more Palestinian suicide attacks than any other city during the Second Intifada. The city and the refugee camps of Balata and Askar constituted the center of "knowhow" for the production and operation of the rockets in the West Bank.

According to the United Nations Office for the Coordination of Humanitarian Affairs, 522 residents of Nablus and surrounding refugee camps, including civilians, were killed and 3,104 injured during IDF military operations from 2000 to 2005. In April 2002, following the Passover massacre—an attack by Palestinian militants that killed 30 Israeli civilians attending a seder dinner at the Park Hotel in Netanya—Israel launched Operation Defensive Shield, a major military operation targeting in particular Nablus and Jenin. At least 80 Palestinians were killed in Nablus during the operation and several houses were destroyed or severely damaged.

The operation also resulted in severe damage to the historic core of the city, with 64 heritage buildings being heavily damaged or destroyed. IDF forces reentered Nablus during Operation Determined Path in June 2002, remaining inside the city until the end of September. Over those three months, there had been more than 70 days of full 24-hour curfews. According to Gush Shalom, IDF bulldozers damaged the al-Khadra Mosque, the Great Mosque, the al-Satoon Mosque and the Greek Orthodox Church in 2002. Some 60 houses were destroyed, and parts of the stone-paving in the old city were damaged. The al-Shifa hammam was hit by three rockets from Apache helicopters. The eastern entrance of the Khan al-Wikala (old market) and three soap factories were destroyed in F-16 bombings. The cost of the damage was estimated at $80 million US.

The Old City of Nablus became a site of fierce clashes in August 2016 between a militant group and Palestinian police. Two Palestinian Police officers were killed by terrorists in the city on 18 August. Shortly after, the police raid on the suspected areas in the Old City deteriorated into a gun battle, in which three armed militants were killed, including one killed by beating following his arrest. The person beaten to death was the suspected "mastermind" behind the 18 August shooting - Ahmed Izz Halaweh, a senior member of the armed wing of the Fatah movement the al-Aqsa Martyrs' Brigades. His death was branded by the UN and Palestinian factions as a part of "extrajudicial executions." A widespread manhunt for multiple gunmen was initiated by the police as a result, concluding with the arrest of one suspect Salah al-Kurdi on 25 August.

== Geography ==
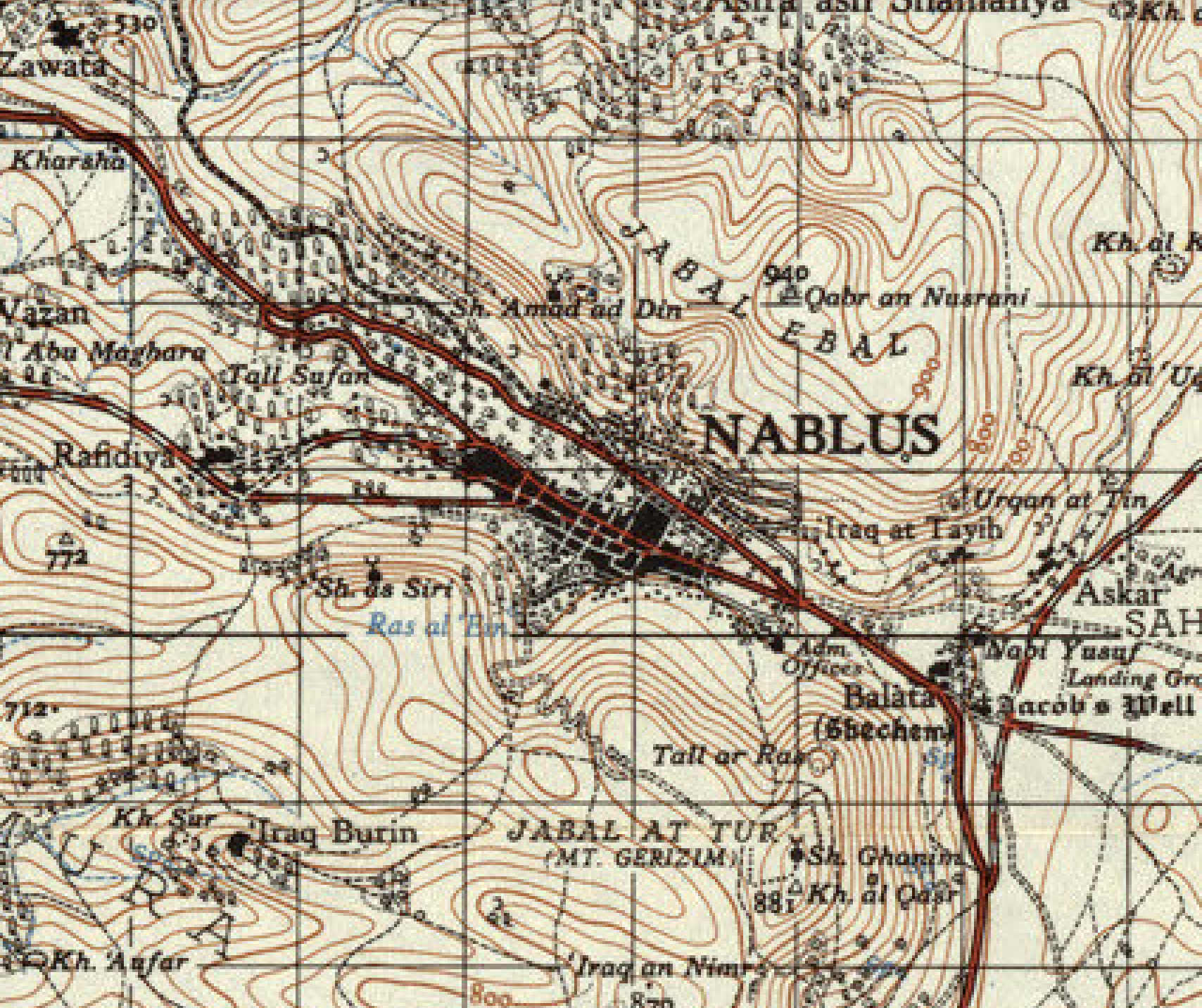
Section of topographical map of Nablus area, ca 1940

Nablus lies in a strategic position at a junction between two ancient commercial roads; one linking the Sharon coastal plain to the Jordan valley, the other linking Nablus to the Galilee in the north, and the biblical Judea to the south through the mountains. The city stands at an elevation of around 550 meters (1,800 ft) above sea level, in a narrow valley running roughly east–west between two mountains: Mount Ebal, the northern mountain, is the taller peak at 940 meters (3,080 ft), while Mount Gerizim, the southern mountain, is 881 meters (2,890 ft) high.

Nablus is located 42 kilometers (26 mi) east of Tel Aviv, Israel, 110 kilometers (68 mi) west of Amman, Jordan and 63 kilometers (39 mi) north of Jerusalem. Nearby cities and towns include Huwara and Aqraba to the south, Beit Furik to the southeast, Tammun to the northeast, Asira ash-Shamaliya to the north and Kafr Qaddum and Tell to the west.

=== Old City ===
In the center of Nablus lies the old city, composed of six major quarters: Yasmina, Gharb, Qaryun, Aqaba, Qaysariyya, and Habala. Habala is the largest quarter and its population growth led to the development of two smaller neighborhoods: al-Arda and Tal al-Kreim. The old city is densely populated and prominent families include the Nimrs, Tuqans, and Abd al-Hadis. The large fortress-like compound of the Abd al-Hadi Palace built in the 19th century is located in Qaryun. The Nimr Hall and the Tuqan Palace are located in the center of the old city. There are several mosques in the Old City: the Great Mosque of Nablus, An-Nasr Mosque, al-Tina Mosque, al-Khadra Mosque, Hanbali Mosque, al-Anbia Mosque, Ajaj Mosque and others. There are six hamaams (bath houses) in the Old City, the most prominent of them being al-Shifa and al-Hana. Al-Shifa was built by the Tuqans in 1624. Al-Hana in Yasmina was the last hamaam built in the city in the 19th century. It was closed in 1928 but restored and reopened in 1994. Several leather tanneries, souks, pottery and textile workshops line the Old City streets. Also located in the Old City is the 15th-century Khan al-Tujjar caravanserai and the Manara Clock Tower, built in 1906.

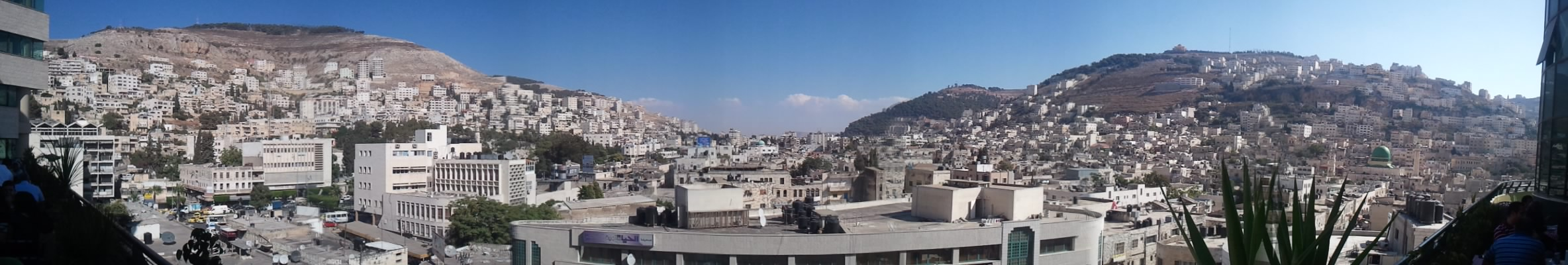
Picture showing to the right the mountain "Ebal" with the rock of "Sit Islamieh", and to the left the south mountain "Jirziem" with an IDF military post on the far left

=== Climate ===
The relatively temperate Mediterranean climate brings hot, dry summers and cool, rainy winters to Nablus. Spring arrives around March–April and the hottest months in Nablus are July and August with the average high being 29.6 °C (85.3 °F). The coldest month is January with temperatures usually at 6.2 °C (43.2 °F). Rain generally falls between October and March, with annual precipitation rates being approximately 656 mm (25.8 in).

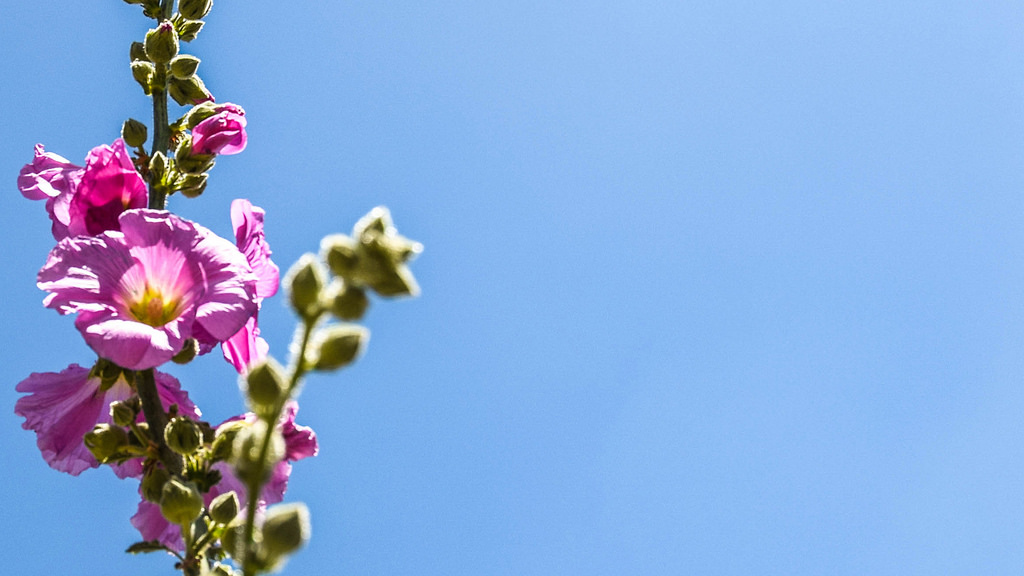
Spring in Nablus, Palestine

Climate data for Nabulus ( 570 meters above sea level) 1972-1997
Month	Jan	Feb	Mar	Apr	May	Jun	Jul	Aug	Sep	Oct	Nov	Dec	Year
Record high °C (°F)	22.9 (73.2)	28.1 (82.6)	30.4 (86.7)	35.0 (95.0)	38.6 (101.5)	38.0 (100.4)	38.1 (100.6)	38.6 (101.5)	38.8 (101.8)	35.3 (95.5)	30.7 (87.3)	28.0 (82.4)	38.8 (101.8)
Mean daily maximum °C (°F)	13.1 (55.6)	14.4 (57.9)	17.2 (63.0)	22.2 (72.0)	25.7 (78.3)	27.9 (82.2)	29.1 (84.4)	29.4 (84.9)	28.4 (83.1)	25.8 (78.4)	20.2 (68.4)	14.6 (58.3)	22.4 (72.3)
Daily mean °C (°F)	9.0 (48.2)	8.8 (47.8)	11.9 (53.4)	16.6 (61.9)	20.7 (69.3)	24.0 (75.2)	24.8 (76.6)	24.4 (75.9)	22.5 (72.5)	20.5 (68.9)	17.5 (63.5)	13.1 (55.6)	17.8 (64.0)
Mean daily minimum °C (°F)	6.2 (43.2)	6.7 (44.1)	8.8 (47.8)	12.1 (53.8)	14.9 (58.8)	17.4 (63.3)	19.3 (66.7)	19.5 (67.1)	18.5 (65.3)	16.2 (61.2)	12.1 (53.8)	7.8 (46.0)	13.3 (55.9)
Record low °C (°F)	−0.6 (30.9)	−2.8 (27.0)	−1.0 (30.2)	0.6 (33.1)	6.9 (44.4)	11.4 (52.5)	12.3 (54.1)	15.9 (60.6)	13.0 (55.4)	9.3 (48.7)	1.4 (34.5)	0.3 (32.5)	−2.8 (27.0)
Average precipitation mm (inches)	155 (6.1)	135 (5.3)	90 (3.5)	34 (1.3)	5 (0.2)	0 (0)	0 (0)	0 (0)	2 (0.1)	17 (0.7)	60 (2.4)	158 (6.2)	656 (25.8)
Average rainy days	12.6	11.3	10.1	4.6	2.2	0.4	0.0	0.3	1.4	4.5	8.2	11.1	66.7
Average relative humidity (%)	74	75	66	55	47	50	65	62	73	62	54	69	63
Mean monthly sunshine hours	145.7	135.6	198.4	246.0	275.9	252.0	297.6	337.9	306.0	303.8	210.0	139.5	2,848.4
Mean daily sunshine hours	4.7	4.8	6.4	8.2	8.9	8.4	9.6	10.9	10.2	9.8	7.0	4.5	7.8
Source 1: Arab Meteorology Book
Source 2: Palestinian Meteorological Department (extremes, sunshine, days with rain)

== Demographics ==
Historical population
Year	Pop.	±%
1596	4,300	—
1849	20,000	+365.1%
1860	15,000	−25.0%
1922	15,947	+6.3%
1931	17,181	+7.7%
1945	23,250	+35.3%
1961	45,768	+96.9%
1987	93,000	+103.2%
1997	100,034	+7.6%
2007	126,132	+26.1%
2017	156,906	+24.4%

In 1596, the population consisted of 806 Muslim households, 20 Samaritan households, 18 Christian households, and 15 Jewish households. Local Ottoman authorities recorded a population of around 20,000 residents in Nablus in 1849. In 1867 American visitors found the town to have a population of 4,000 'the chief part of whom are Mohammedans', with some Jews and Christians and 'about 150 Samaritans'. In the 1922 British census of Palestine, there were a total of 15,947 inhabitants (15,238 Muslims, 544 Christians, 147 Samaritans, 16 Jews, and two Druze). Population continued to grow, rising to 17,189 (16,483 Muslims, 533 Christians, 160 Samaritans, seven Druze, and six Jews) at the 1931 census of Palestine with 309 in nearby suburbs (225 Muslims and 84 Christians).

The 1938 village statistics show a further increase to 19,200. The 1945 village statistics list the population as 23,250 (22,360 Muslims, 680 Christians, and 120 "other").

According to the Palestinian Central Bureau of Statistics (PCBS), Nablus had a population of 126,132 in 2007. In the PCBS's 1997 census, the city had a population of 100,034, including 23,397 refugees, accounting for about 24% of the city's residents. Nablus' Old City had a population of 12,000 in 2006. The population of Nablus city comprises 40% of its governorate's inhabitants.

Approximately half of population is under 20 years old. In 1997, the age distribution of the city's inhabitants was 28.4% under the age of 10, 20.8% from 10 to 19, 17.7% from 20 to 29, 18% from 30 to 44, 11.1% from 45 to 64 and 3.7% above the age of 65. The gender distribution was 50,945 males (50.92%) and 49,089 females (49.07%).

=== Religion ===
In 891 CE, during the early centuries of Islamic rule, Nablus had a religiously diverse population of Samaritans, Muslims and Christians. Arab geographer Al-Dimashqi, recorded that under the rule of the Mamluk Dynasty (Muslim Dynasty based in Egypt), local Muslims, Samaritans, Orthodox Christians, Catholics and Jews populated the city. At the 1931 census, the population was counted as 16,483 Muslims, 533 Christians, 6 Jews, 7 Druses and 160 Samaritans. However, this census was taken after the 1929 Palestine riots which drove the Jews out of many majority-Arab cities.

The majority of the inhabitants today are Muslim, but there are small Christian and Samaritan communities as well. Much of the local Palestinian Muslim population of Nablus is believed to be descended from Samaritans who converted to Islam. Certain Nabulsi family names are associated with Samaritan ancestry – Muslimani, Yaish, and Shakshir among others. According to the historian Fayyad Altif, large numbers of Samaritans converted because of persecution and because the monotheistic nature of Islam made it easy for them to accept it.

In 1967, there were about 3,500 Christians of various denominations in Nablus, but that figure dwindled to about 650 in 2008. Of the Christian populace, there are seventy Orthodox Christian families, about thirty Catholic (Roman Catholic and Eastern Melkite Catholic) families and thirty Anglican families. Most Christians used to live in the suburb of Rafidia in the western part of the city.

There are seventeen Islamic monuments and eleven mosques in the Old City. Nine of the mosques were established before the 15th century. In addition to Muslim houses of worship, Nablus contains an Orthodox church dedicated to Saint Justin Martyr, built in 1898, and the ancient Samaritan synagogue, which is still in use.

== Economy ==
Beginning in the early 16th century, trade networks connecting Nablus to Damascus and Cairo were supplemented by the establishment of trading posts in the Hejaz and Gulf regions to the south and east, as well as in the Anatolian Peninsula and the Mediterranean islands of Crete and Cyprus. Nablus also developed trade relations with Aleppo, Mosul, and Baghdad. The Ottoman government oversaw the safety and funding of the annual hajj (qafilat al-hajj) from Damascus to the Islamic holy cities of Mecca and Medina. Pilgrimage caravans became a key factor in the fiscal and political relationship between Nablus and the central government. For a brief period in the early 17th century, the governor of Nablus, Farrukh Pasha, was appointed leader of the caravan (amir al-hajj), and he constructed a large commercial compound in Nablus for that purpose.

In 1882, there were 32 soap factories and 400 looms exporting their products throughout the Middle East. Nablus exported three-fourths of its soap — the city's most important commodity—to Cairo by caravan through Gaza and the Sinai Peninsula, and by sea through the ports of Jaffa and Gaza. From Egypt, and particularly from Cairo and Damietta, Nablus merchants imported mainly rice, sugar, and spices, as well as linen, cotton, and wool textiles. Cotton, soap, olive oil, and textiles were exported to Damascus, whence silks, high-quality textiles, copper, and a number luxury items, such as jewellery were imported. Outside the city limits, extensive fields of olive groves, fig and pomegranate orchards and grape vineyards covered the slopes. Crops such as tomatoes, cucumbers, melons and mulukhiyya were grown in the fields and grain mills were scattered across central Samaria. Nablus was also the largest producer of cotton in the Levant, producing over 225,000 kg (496,040 lb) of the product by 1837.

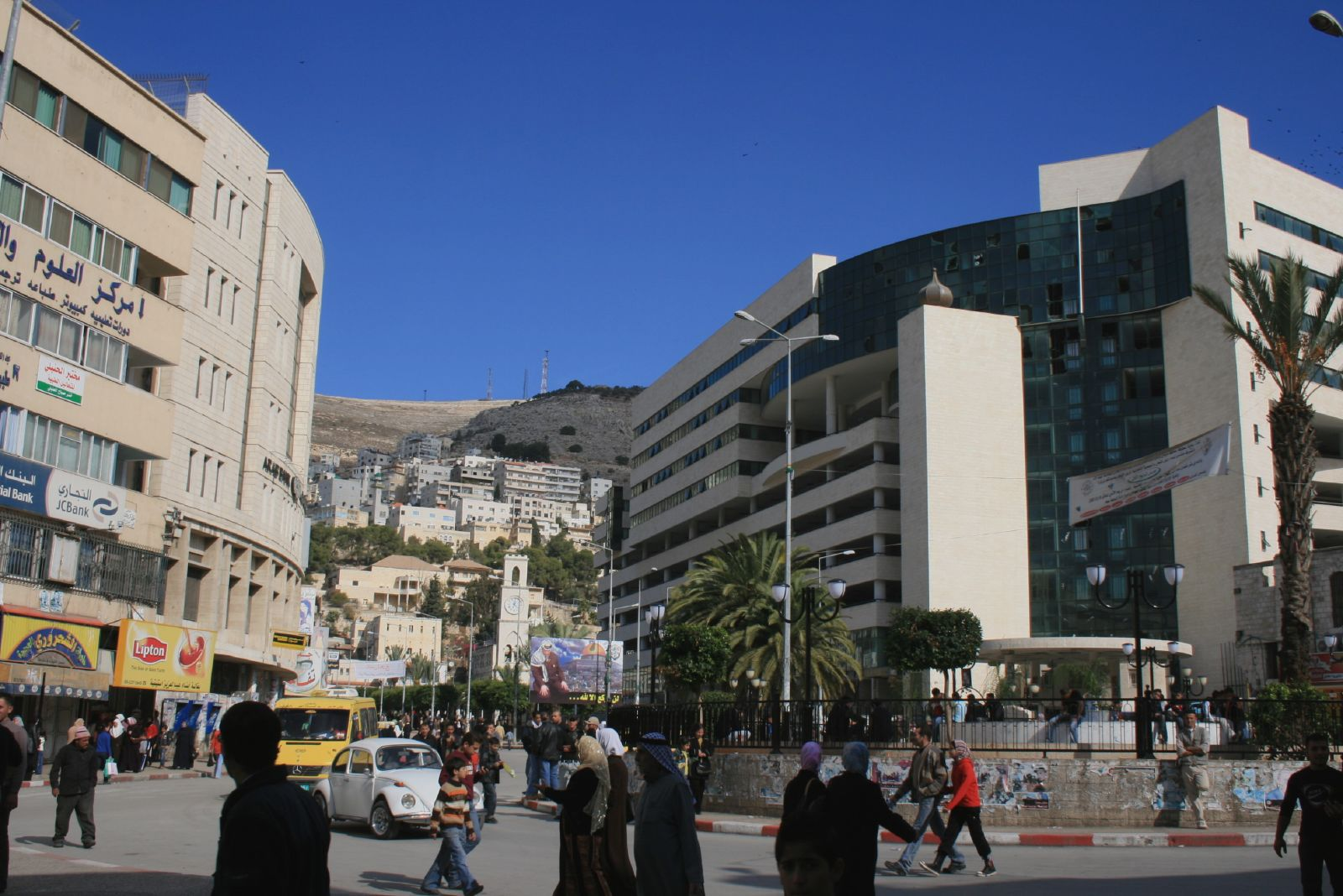
Downtown Nablus, Martyrs Square

Today, Nablus has a bustling modern commercial center with restaurants, and shopping malls. Traditional industries such as the production of soap, olive oil, and Palestinian handicrafts continue to operate in Nablus. Other industries include furniture production, tile production, stone quarrying, textile manufacturing and leather tanning. The city is widely known for sweets like kunafah, olive oil, soap and ice-cream.

The Vegetable Oil Industry Co. is a Nablus factory that produces olive oil, and vegetable butter which is exported to Jordan. In 2000, the al-Huda Textiles factory in Nablus produced 500 pieces of clothing daily; however, production dropped to 150–200 pieces in 2002. Al-Huda imports textiles from China and exports finished products to Israel. In 2003, there were eight restaurants and four hotels — the largest being al-Qasr and al-Yasmeen. The soap industry has suffered from the West Bank closures and IDF incursions. In 2008, only two soap factories were still open.

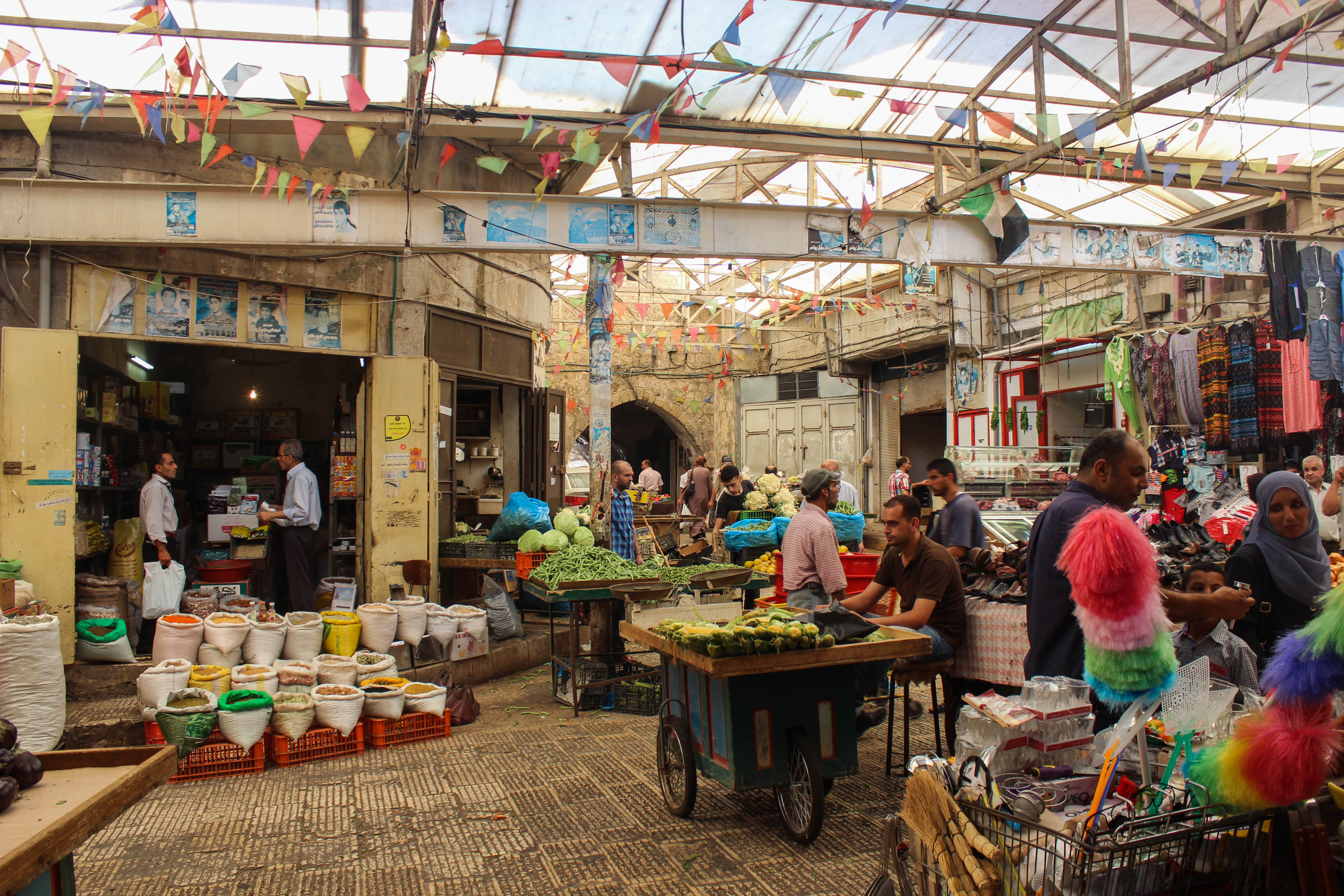
One of the old markets in Nablus

The Al-Arz ice-cream company is the largest of six ice-cream manufacturers in the Palestinian territories. The Nablus business developed from an ice-factory set up by Mohammad Anabtawi in the town centre in 1950. It produces 50 tons a day, and exports to Jordan and Iraq. Most of the ingredients are imported from Israel.

Before 2000, 13.4% of Nablus' residents worked in Israel, with the figure dropping to 4.7% in 2004. The city's manufacturing sector made up 15.7% of the economy in 2004, a drop from 21% in 2000. Since 2000, most of the workforce has been employed in agriculture and local trade. In the wake of the Intifada, unemployment rates rose from 14.2% in 1997 to 60% in 2004. According to an OCHA report in 2008, one of the reasons for the high unemployment was a ring of checkpoints around the city, leading to the relocation of many businesses.

Since the removal of the Hawara roadblock, the casbah has become a vibrant marketplace. Nablus is home to the Palestine Securities Exchange (PSE) and the al-Quds Financial Index, housed in the al-Qasr building in the Rafidia suburb of the city. The PSE's first trading session took place on 19 February 1997. In 2007, the capitalization of the PSE topped 3.5 million Jordanian dinars.

== Education ==
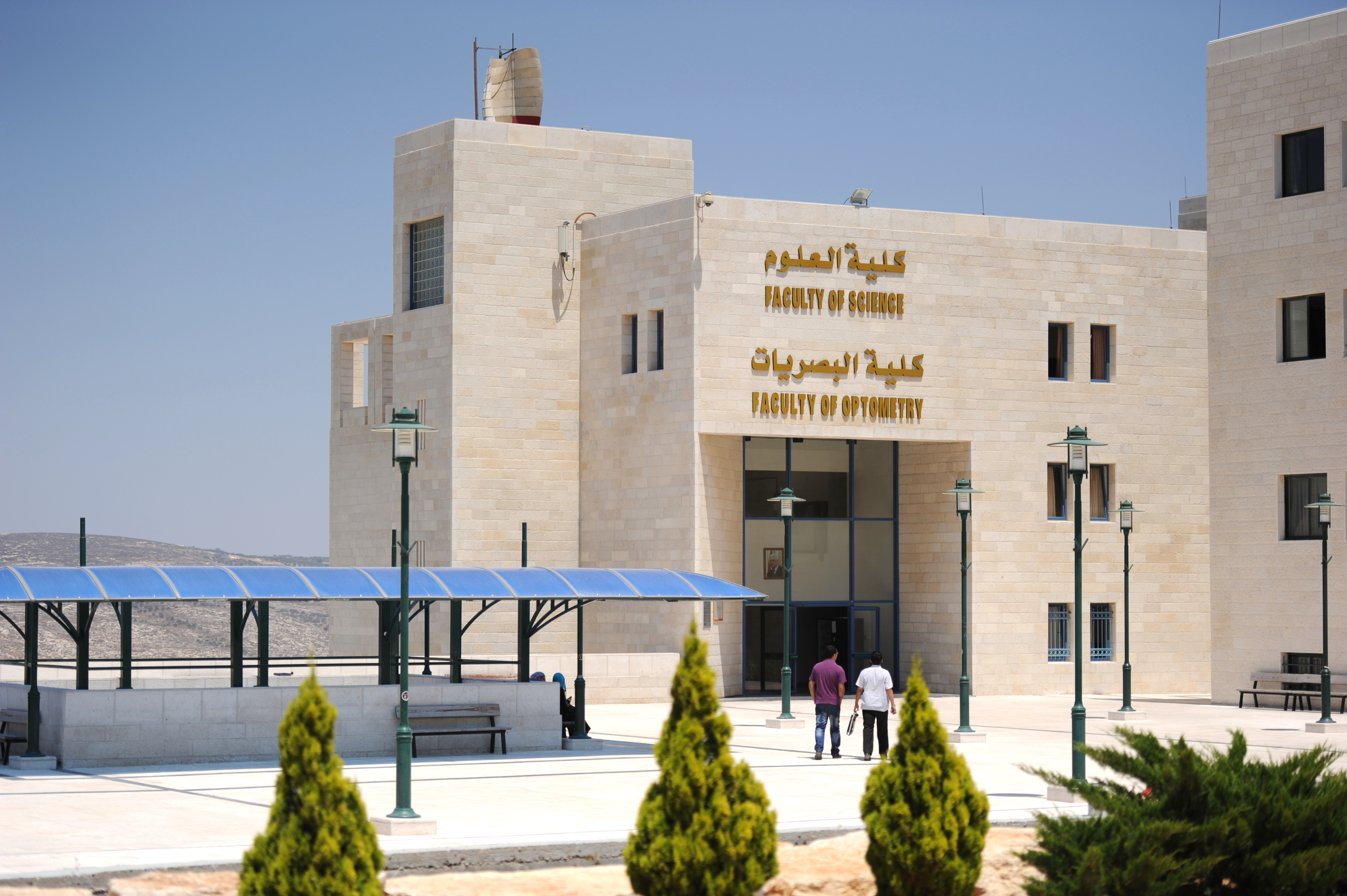
An-Najah University, Nablus

According to the Palestinian Central Bureau of Statistics (PCBS), in 1997, 44,926 were enrolled in schools (41.2% in primary school, 36.2% in secondary school, and 22.6% in high school). About 19.8% of high school students received bachelor diplomas or higher diplomas. In 2006, there were 234 schools and 93,925 students in the Nablus Governorate; 196 schools are run by the Education Ministry of the Palestinian National Authority, 14 by the United Nations Relief and Works Agency (UNRWA) and 24 are private schools.

Nablus is also home to an-Najah National University, the largest Palestinian university in the West Bank. Founded in 1918 by the an-Najah Nabulsi School, it became a college in 1941 and a university in 1977. An-Najah was closed down by Israeli authorities during the First Intifada, but reopened in 1991. Today, the university has three campuses in Nablus with over 16,500 students and 300 professors. The university's faculties include seven in the humanities and nine in the sciences.

Nablus has been ranked as the 5th best city in the Middle East to learn Arabic. For non-Arabic aspirants, An-Najah University has faculties, providing courses related to Arabic language.

== Healthcare ==
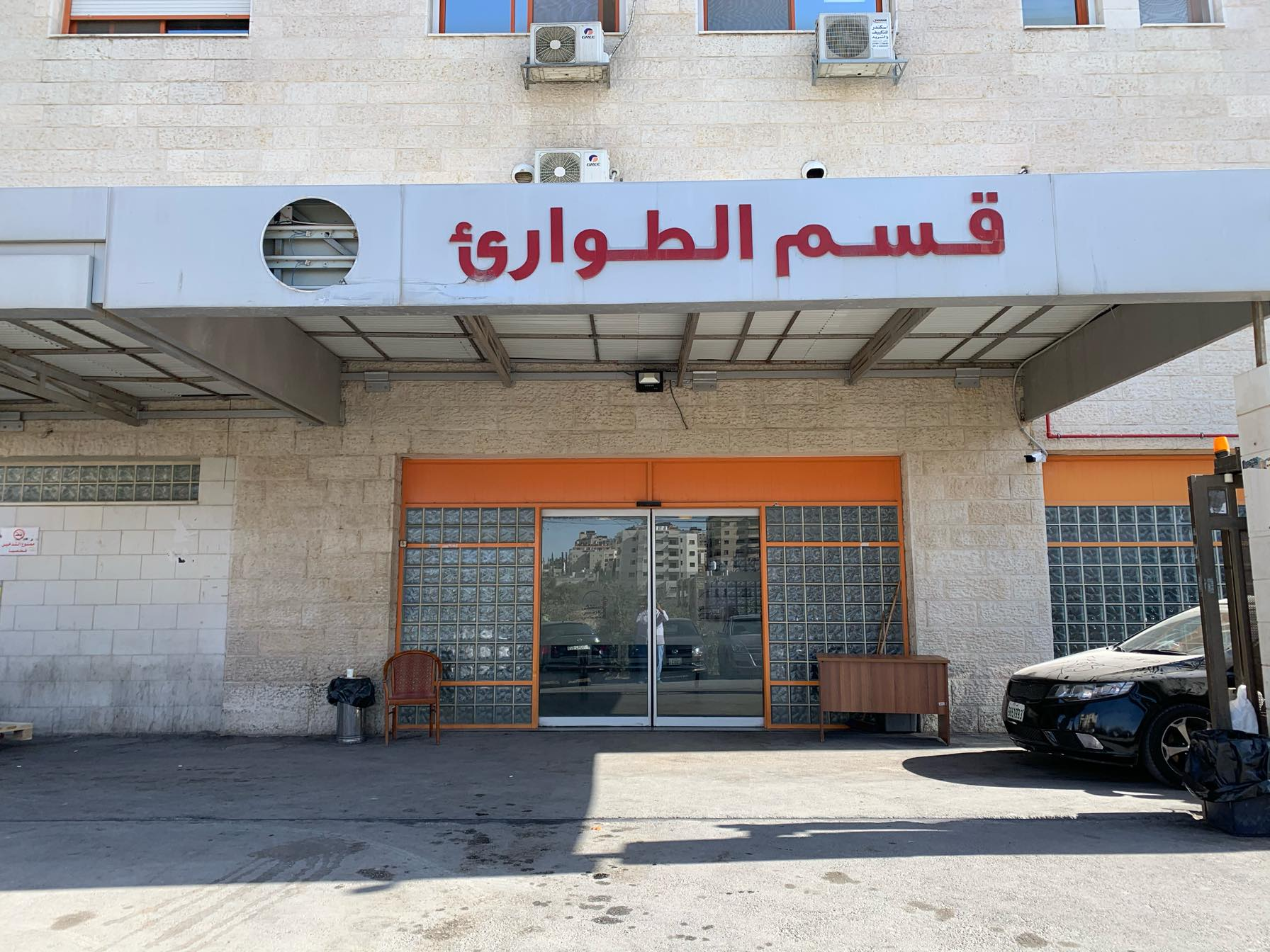
Nablus Speciality Hospital in 2019

There are six hospitals in Nablus, the four major ones being al-Ittihad, St. Lukes, al-Watani (the National), and the Rafidia Surgical Hospital, which is located in the western neighborhood of Rafidiya, and is the largest hospital in the city. Al-Watani Hospital specializes in oncology services. The Anglican St. Lukes hospital was founded in 1900 by the medical missionary Gaskoin Wright; the National Hospital was founded in 1910. In addition to hospitals, Nablus contains the al-Rahma and at-Tadamon clinics, the al-Razi medical center, the Amal Center for Rehabilitation and 68 pharmacies. The Nablus Speciality Hospital was built in 2001, which is specializes in open heart surgery, angiograms and angioplasty.

== Culture and arts ==
Nablus and its culture enjoy a certain renown throughout the Palestinian Territories and the Arab world with significant and unique contributions to Palestinian culture, cuisine and costume. Nabulsi, meaning "from Nablus", is used to describe items such as handicrafts (e.g. Nabulsi soap) and food products (e.g. Nabulsi cheese) that are made in Nablus or in the traditional Nablus style.

=== Customs ===
Al-Shaʿbūniyya (الشعبونية) is a long-standing Nabulsi social custom associated with the middle of Sha'ban, centered on maintaining kinship ties, particularly among women. Families traditionally exchange home-prepared foods and sweets, and women make visits to relatives and neighbors as an expression of maintaining family bonds (صلة الرحم). Contemporary accounts note changes in scale and form due to urban life, economic pressures, and disruptions such as the COVID-19 pandemic.

=== Traditional costume ===
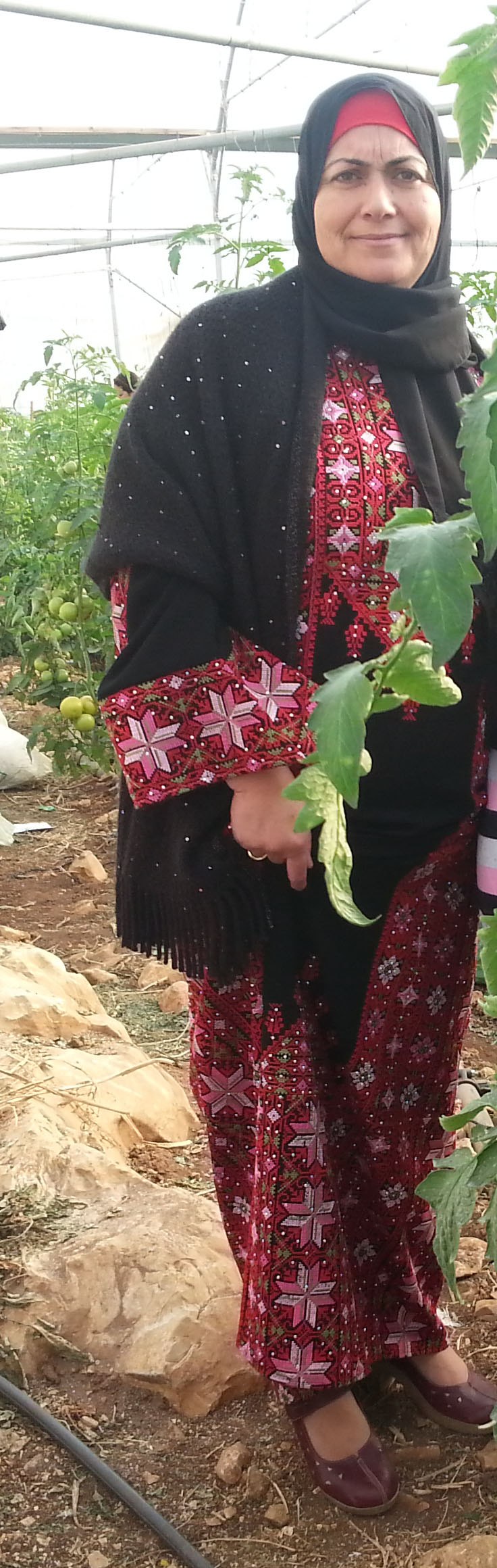
A Palestinian woman wearing an embroidered dress associated with the Palestinian city of Nablus. It is considered part of Palestinian folk heritage and is worn on special occasions and holidays in Nablus.

Nablus costume was of a distinctive style that employed colorful combinations of various fabrics. Because of its position as important trade center with a flourishing souk ("market"), in the late 19th century, there was a large choice of fabrics available in the city, from Damascus and Aleppo silk to Manchester cottons and calicos. Similar in construction to the garments worn in the Galilee, both long and short Turkish style jackets were worn over the thob ("robe"). For daily wear, thobs were often made of white cotton or linen, with a preference for winged sleeves. In the summer, costumes often incorporated interwoven striped bands of red, green and yellow on the front and back, with appliqué and braidwork popularly decorating the qabbeh ("square chest piece").

=== Cuisine ===
A siniyyeh of Kanafeh in a souq in Nablus

Nablus is one of the Palestinian cities that sustained elite classes, fostering the development of a culture of "high cuisine", such as that of Damascus or Baghdad. The city is home to a number of food products well known throughout the Levant, the Arab world and the former provinces of the Ottoman Empire.

Kanafeh (or Kunafa) is the best known Nabulsi sweet. It is made of several fine shreds of pastry noodles with honey-sweetened cheese in the center. The top layer of the pastry is usually dyed orange with food coloring and sprinkled with crushed pistachios. Now made throughout the Middle East, kanafeh Nabulsi uses a white-brine cheese called jibneh Nabulsi. Boiled sugar is used as a syrup for kanafeh.

Other sweets made in Nablus include baklawa, tamriyeh, mabrumeh and ghuraybeh, a plain pastry made of butter, flour and sugar in an "S"-shape, or shaped as fingers or bracelets.

=== Cultural centers ===
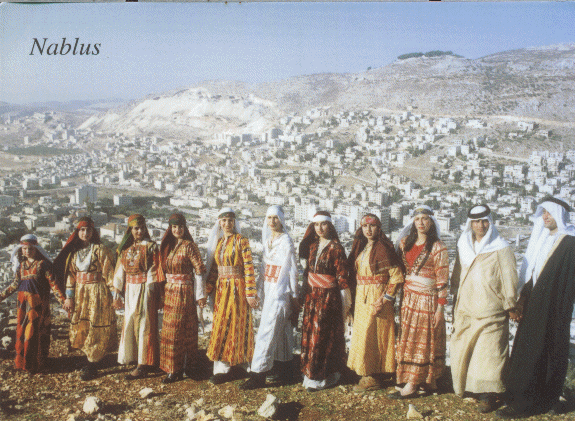
Dabke dance group on Mount Gerizim

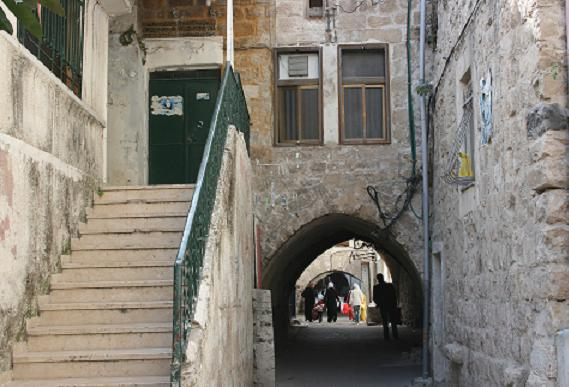
Alley in the Old City leading to and from the souk, 2008

There are three cultural centers in Nablus. The Child Cultural Center (CCC), founded in 1998 and built in a renovated historic building, operates an art and drawing workshop, a stage for play performances, a music room, a children's library and a multimedia lab. The Children Happiness Center (CHC) was also established in 1998. Its main activities include promoting Palestinian culture through social events, dabke classes and field trips. In addition to national culture, the CHC has a football and chess team. The Nablus municipal government established its own cultural center in 2003, called the Nablus Municipality Cultural Center (NMCC) aimed at establishing and developing educational facilities.

=== Soap production ===
Nabulsi soap or sabon nabulsi is a type of castile soap produced only in Nablus and made of three primary ingredients: virgin olive oil, water, and a sodium compound. Since the 10th century, Nabulsi soap has enjoyed a reputation for being a fine product, and has been exported across the Arab world and to Europe. Though the number of soap factories decreased from a peak of thirty in the 19th century to only two today, efforts to preserve this important part of Palestinian and Nabulsi cultural heritage continue.

Made in a cube-like shape about 1.5 inches (3.8 cm) tall and 2.25 by 2.25 inches (5.7 by 5.7 cm) wide, the color of Nabulsi soap is like that of "the page of an old book." The cubes are stamped on the top with the seal of the factory that produces it. The soap's sodium compound came from the barilla plant. Prior to the 1860s, in the summertime, the barilla would be placed in towering stacks, burned, and then the ashes and coals would be gathered into sacks, and transported to Nablus from the area of modern-day Jordan in large caravans. In the city, the ashes and coals were pounded into a fine natural alkaline soda powder called qilw. Today, qilw is still used in combination with lime.

== Local government ==
The city of Nablus is the muhfaza (seat) of the Nablus Governorate, and is governed by a municipal council made up of fifteen elected members, including the mayor.

The two primary political parties in the municipal council are Hamas and Fatah. In the 2005 Palestinian municipal elections, the Reform and Change list representing the Hamas faction won 73.4% of the vote, gaining the majority of the municipal seats (13). Palestine Tomorrow, representing Fatah, gained the remaining two seats with 13.0% of the vote. Other political parties, such as the Palestinian People's Party and the Democratic Front for the Liberation of Palestine failed to gain any seats in the council, though they each received over 1,000 votes.

Yaish's four-year term legally expired in December 2009. While elections in the West Bank were scheduled for 17 July 2010, they were canceled because of Fatah's lack of agreement on list of candidates. Nablus was one of the most important municipalities where Fatah failed to resolve internal conflicts that resulted in two competing Fatah lists: one headed by former mayor Ghassan Shakaa and one headed by Amin Makboul.

In the October 2012 municipal elections, Hamas boycotted the polls, protesting the holding of elections while reconciliation efforts with Fatah were at a standstill. Former mayor Ghassan Shakaa, a former local Fatah leader, won the vote as an independent against Fatah member Amin Makboul and another independent candidate.

=== Mayors ===
Modern mayorship in Nablus began in 1869 with the appointment of Sheikh Mohammad Tuffaha by the Ottoman governor of Syria/Palestine. On 2 July 1980, Bassam Shakaa, then mayor of Nablus, lost both of his legs as a result of a car bombing carried out by Israeli militants affiliated with the Gush Emunim Underground movement.

The current mayor, Adly Yaish, a Hamas member, was arrested by the Israel Defense Forces in May 2007, during Operation Summer Rains, launched in retaliation for the kidnapping of Israeli soldier Gilad Shalit by Hamas. Municipal council members Abdel Jabbar Adel Musa "Dweikat", Majida Fadda, Khulood El-Masri, and Mahdi Hanbali were also arrested. He spent 15 months in prison without being charged.

== Municipal services ==
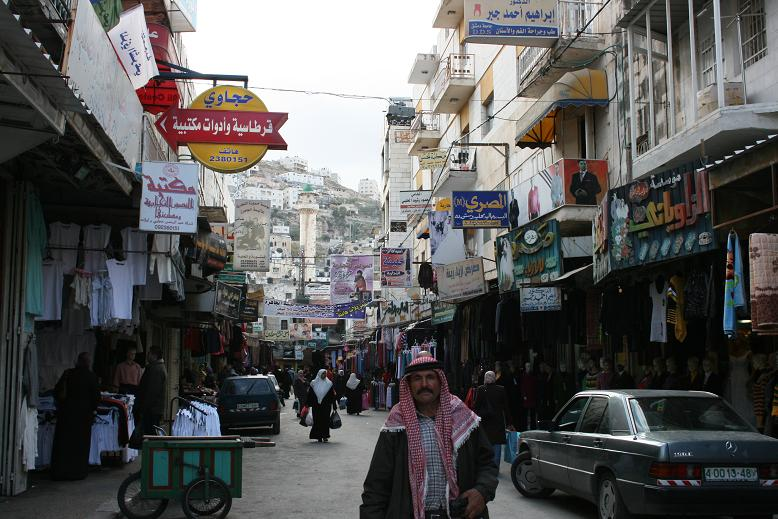
A street in Nablus leading to the Old City. Minaret of An-Nasr Mosque in the background

In 1997, 99.7% of Nablus' 18,003 households were connected to electricity through a public network. Prior to its establishment in 1957, electricity came from private generators. Today, the majority of the inhabitants of 18 nearby towns, in addition to the city's inhabitants, are connected to the Nablus network.

The majority of households are connected to a public sewage system (93%), with the remaining 7% connected through cesspits. The sewage system, established n the early 1950s, also connects the refugee camps of Balata, Askar and Ein Beit al-Ma'. Pipe water is provided for 100% of the city's households, primarily through a public network (99.3%), but some residents receive water through a private system (0.7%). The water network was established in 1932 by the British authorities and is fed by water from four nearby wells: Deir Sharaf, Far'a, al-Badan and Audala.

=== Fire department ===
Nablus is one of the few cities in the West Bank to have a fire department, which was founded in 1958. At that time, the "fire brigade" (as it was called) was composed of five members and one extinguishing vehicle. In 2007, the department had seventy members and over twenty vehicles. Until 1986, it was responsible for all of the northern West Bank, but today it only covers the Nablus and Tubas Governorates. From 1997 to 2006, Nablus' fire department extinguished 15,346 fires.

== Transportation ==
In the early 20th century, Nablus was the southernmost station of a spur from the Jezreel Valley railway's Afula station, itself a spur from the Hejaz railway. The extension of the railway to Nablus was built in 1911–12. During the beginning of the British Mandate, one weekly train was operated from Haifa to Nablus via Afula and Jenin. The railway was destroyed during the 1948 Arab–Israeli War, and the route of the line was bisected by the Green Line.

The main Beersheba–Nazareth road running through the middle of the West Bank ends in Nablus, although the thoroughfare of local Arabs is severely restricted. The city was connected to Tulkarm, Qalqilya and Jenin by roads which are now blocked by the Israeli West Bank barrier. From 2000 until 2011, Israel maintained checkpoints such as Huwwara checkpoint which effectively cut off the city, severely curtailing social and economic travel. From January 2002, buses, taxis, trucks and private citizens required a permit from the Israeli military authorities to leave and enter Nablus. Since 2011, there has been a relaxation of travel restrictions and the dismantlement of some checkpoints.

The nearest airport is the Ben Gurion International Airport in Lod, Israel, but because of restrictions governing the entry of Palestinians to Israel, and their lack of access to foreign Embassies to get travel visas, many residents must travel to Amman, Jordan to use the Queen Alia International Airport, which requires passage through a number of checkpoints and the Jordanian border. Taxis are the main form of public transportation within Nablus and the city contains 28 taxi offices and garages.

== Sports ==
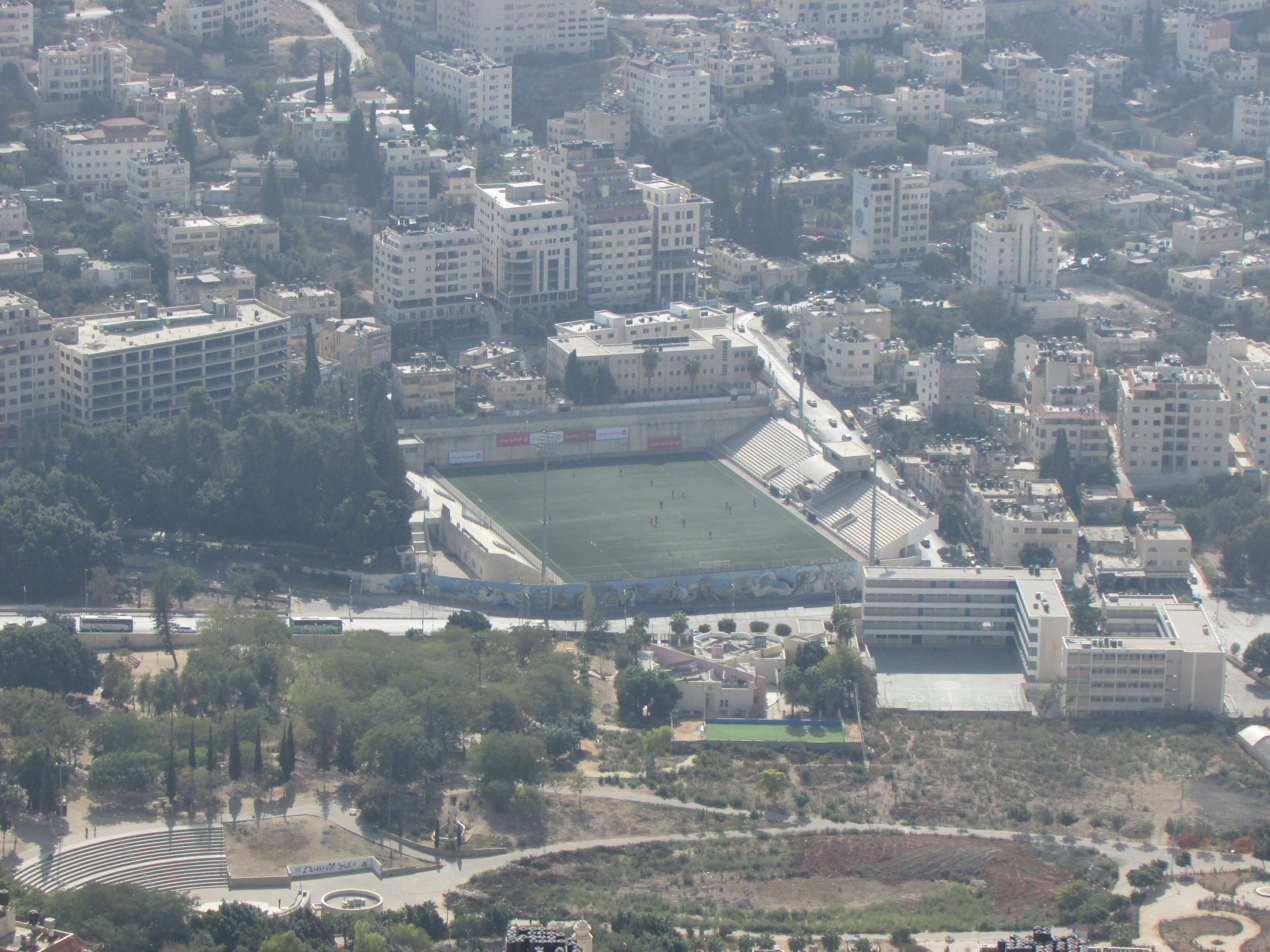
Nablus municipal stadium and surroundings

The Nablus football stadium has a capacity of 8,000. The stadium is home to the city's football club al-Ittihad, which is in the main league of the Palestinian Territories. The club participated in the Middle East Mediterranean Scholar Athlete Games in 2000.

== International relations ==
=== Twin towns and sister cities ===
Nablus is twinned, or has sister city relationships with:

- Lille, France
- Nazareth, Israel
- (Republic of Ireland) Dublin, Ireland
- Como, Italy
- Metropolitan City of Florence, Italy
- Naples, Italy
- Poznań, Poland
- Rabat, Morocco
- Stavanger, Norway
- Khasavyurt, Russia
- Dundee, United Kingdom
- Boulder, Colorado, United States

== See also ==
- List of cities administered by the Palestinian National Authority
- List of people from Nablus
