= Touqan Palace =

Historical building in Nablus, West Bank, Palestine

Coordinates: 32°13′07″N 35°15′38″E

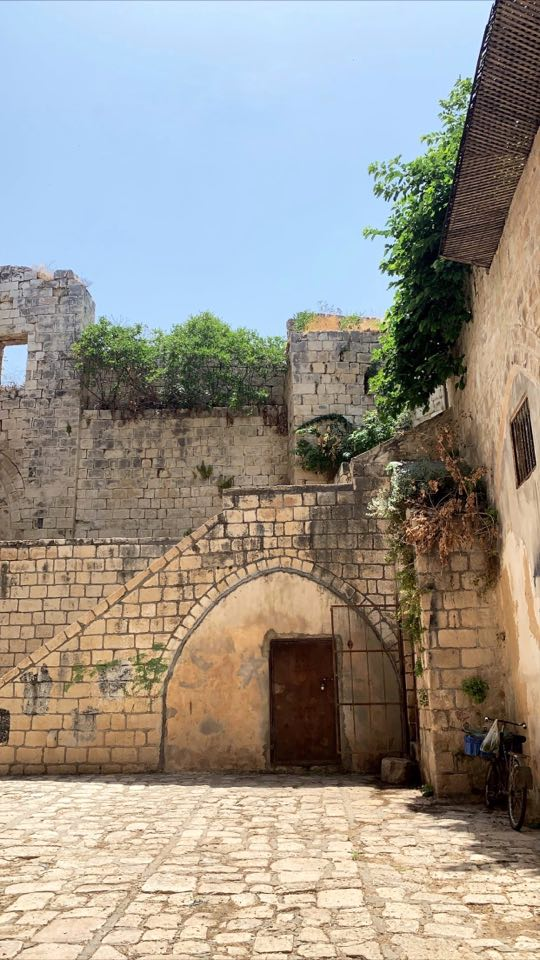

Touqan Palace (Arabic: قصر طوقان) is a historic building in the city of Nablus, West Bank, Palestine with more than one hundred rooms. The building is located on the western side of the Al-Beik Mosque. It was built by Ibrahim Bey bin Saleh Pasha Touqan with funding from his father in the eighteenth century. Touquan was related to poet and writer Ibrahim Toukan. His sister Fadwa Toukan was also a poet.

== See also ==
- Abd al-Hadi Palace
- Jacir Palace
