= Abd al-Hadi Palace =

19th-century palatial residence in Nablus, West Bank, Palestine

Coordinates: 32°13′04″N 35°15′33″E

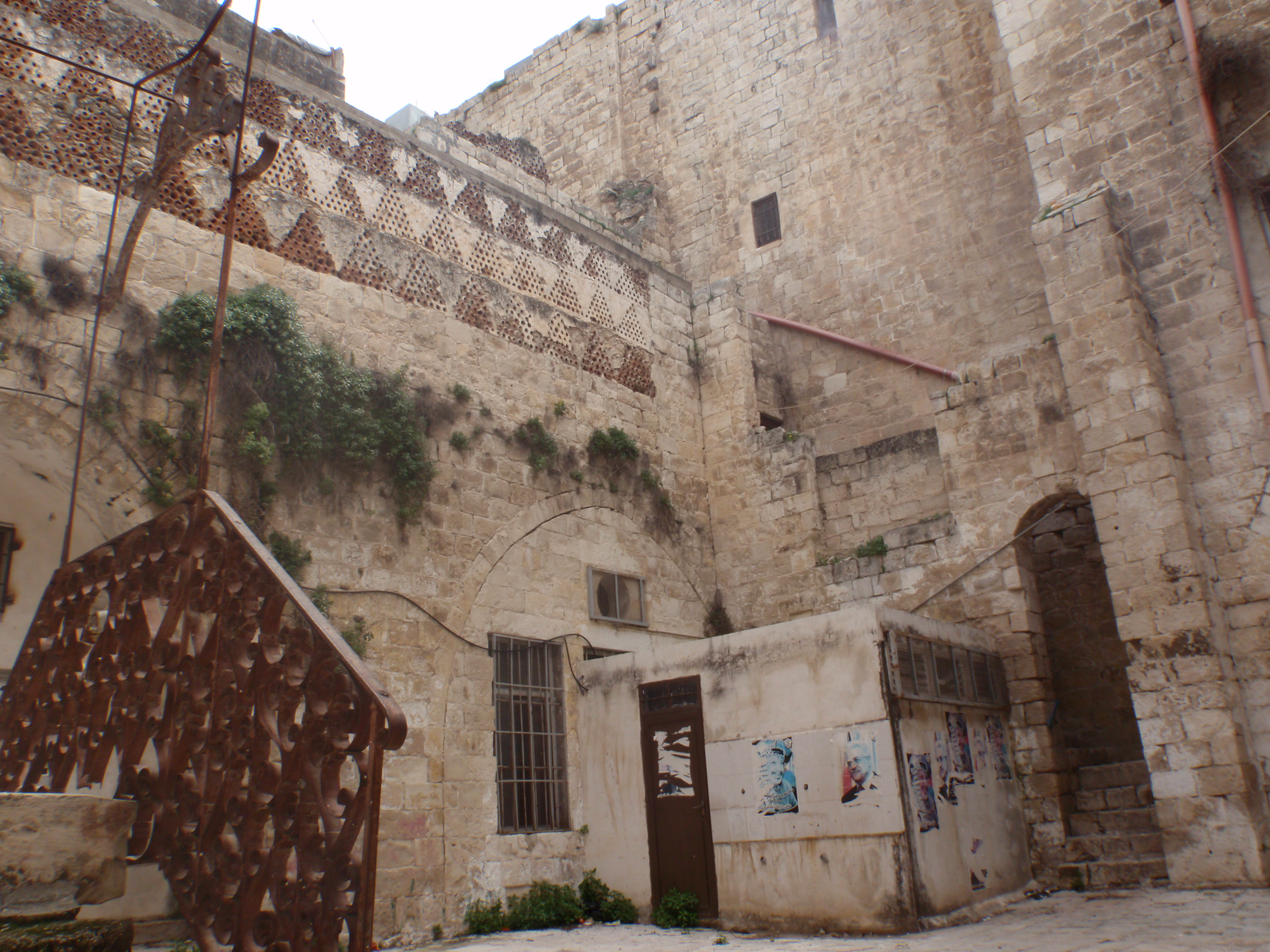
Inside courtyard, Abd al-Hadi Palace, 2011

The Abd al-Hadi Palace or Qasr Abd al-Hadi (Arabic: قصر عبد الهادي) is a large palace located in the Qaryun quarter of the Old City of Nablus, West Bank, Palestine. It was built in the 19th century as a residence for the dominant Abd al-Hadi clan of the District of Nablus. It consists of three floors, arches, winding staircases, hidden courtyards, gardens, balconies, and built mainly of white limestone. The building was designed by Mahmud ´Abd al-Hadi himself, who was the governor at the time. To Mary Rogers, the sister of the British vice-consul in Haifa, it seemed at the start of 1860s as "the handsomest dwelling-house I had seen in Palestine. It is built of well-hewn fine limestone, and enriched with marble pavements, columns, and arches."

Today, it is still inhabited by some Abd al-Hadi families. In 2002 the Abd al-Hadi Palace was hit by mortar fire and damaged by explosions during the Israeli incursion into Nablus.

== See also ==
- Touqan Palace
- Jacir Palace
- Al-Nimr Palace
