= Al-Nimr Palace =

Palace in Nablus, West Bank, Palestine

Coordinates: 32.22036°N 35.26708°E

Al-Nimr Palace (Arabic: قصر النمر) is a vast seventeenth-century palace in Nablus, West Bank, Palestine. It is located in the northeastern side of the Habla neighborhood and belonged to the Nimr family, the Nimrs were originally subdistrict chiefs in the hinterlands of Homs and Hama, the palace was commissioned by Abdullah Pasha al-Nimr, leader of the Ottoman military campaigns, sent to suppress local strife and secure the region. Abdullah Pasha who was subsequently appointed governor of Nablus and guarantor of Karak Castle was the founder of a palace-based Nablus ruler dynasty.

== Palace building ==
As for the building, it consists of two parts, a northern section, which is the summer palace, and a southern one, which is the large palace to which a large entrance leads, and at the same time, each of them consists of two floors: where the first is an open yard, a pool of water, and horse stables, and the second consists of a large group of rooms divided into two wings: one for the harem, and one for the men.

The traveler, Sheikh Abd al-Ghani al-Nabulsi, of Damascene origin, visited the palace in the year 1101 AH/1671 CE, and he was hosted by the city's recipient at that time, Ali al-Sharbaji "Al-Nimr". Sheikh Nabulsi described the palace as beautiful.
