= Outline of Palestine =

Country in the Middle East

The Palestinian Flag

The Coat of arms of Palestine

A map of the Middle East with Palestine's West Bank and Gaza Strip highlighted in red

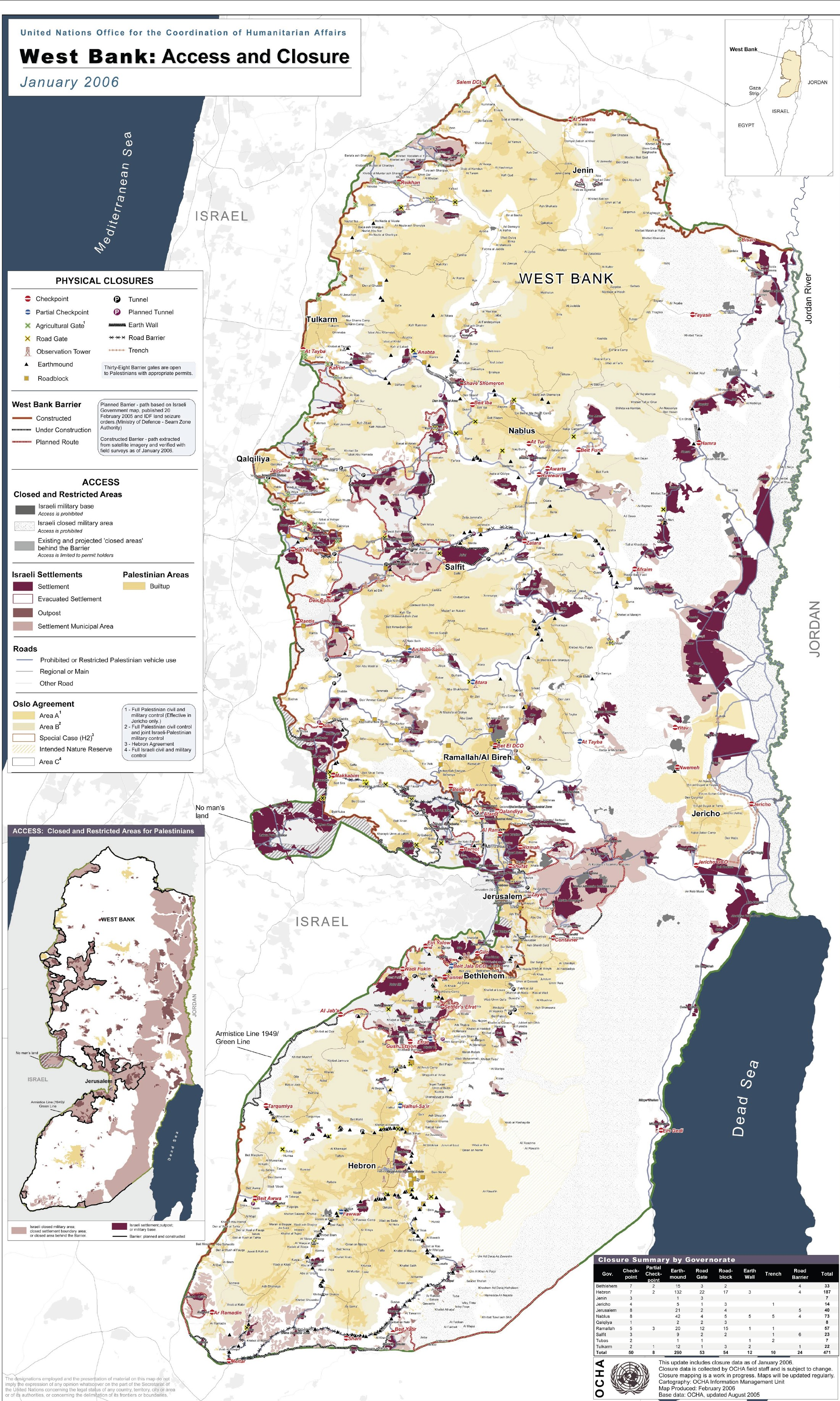
An enlargeable map of the West Bank

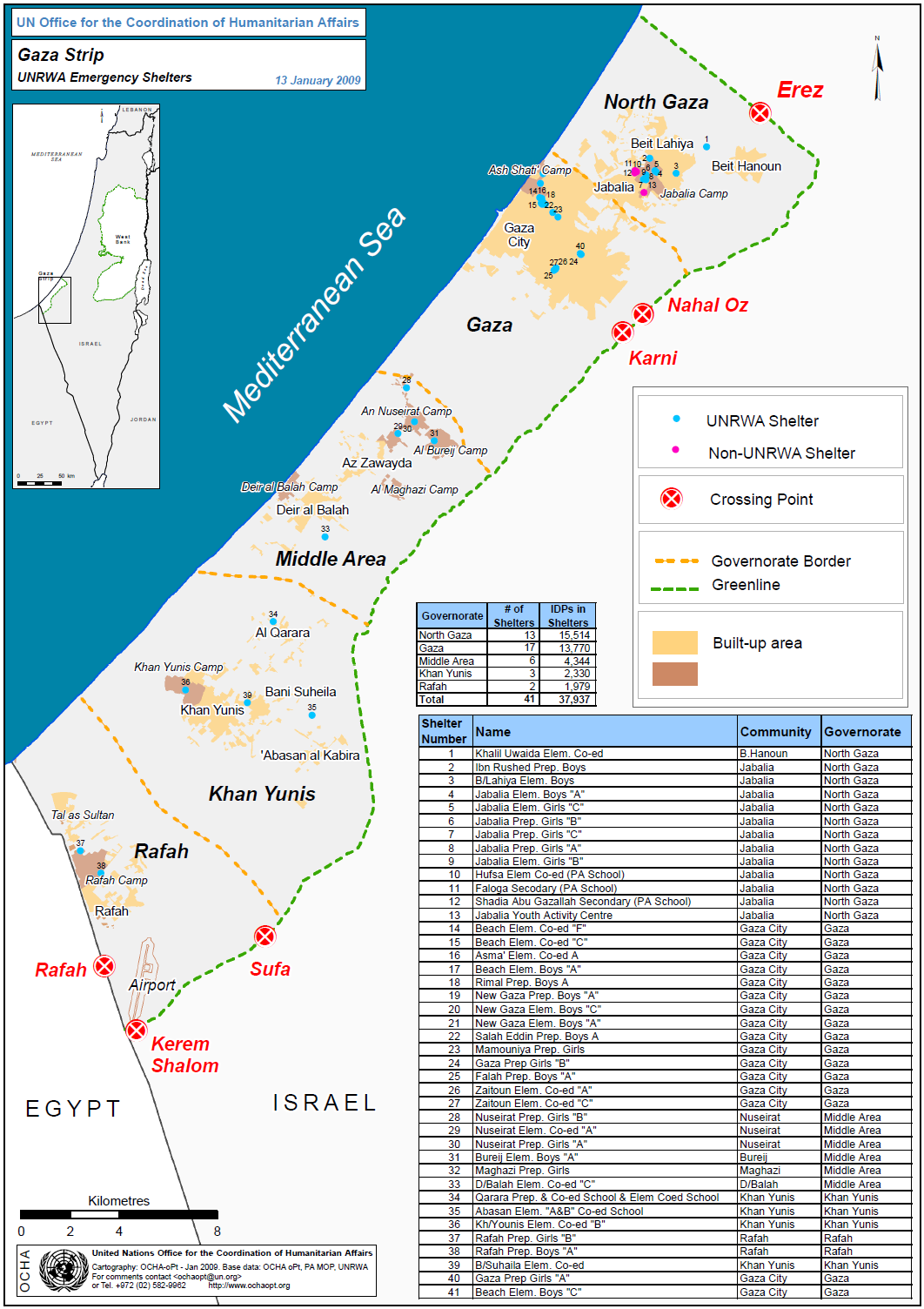
An enlargeable map of the Gaza Strip

The following outline is provided as an overview of and topical guide to Palestine:

State of Palestine – a country in the Middle East, politically under the jurisdiction of the Palestinian government and the Hamas Government in Gaza. Since the Palestinian Declaration of Independence in 1988 and the consequent admission into UN as an observer state in 2012, Palestine is today recognized by three-quarters of the world's countries. Its proclaimed capital is East Jerusalem, and Ramallah is its administrative center. Although recently promoted to a non-member state status in the UN, Palestine does not exert full control of its territory and has historically turbulent relations with Israel and much of the west.

== General reference ==
- Pronunciation: /ˈpælɪstaɪn/ PAL-ist-eyen
- Common English country names: Palestine; State of Palestine; Palestinian territories
- Official English country name: U.S. State Department: Palestinian Territories ; E.U. ISO 3166-2: Palestine, State of ; UN-affiliated organizations: Palestine, State of
- Common endonym(s): Filasṭīn (Arabic: فلسطين, also transliterated Falasṭīn and Filisṭīn)
- Official endonym(s): Dawlat Filasṭīn (Arabic: دولة فلسطين)
- Adjectival(s): Palestinian
- Demonym(s): Palestinian people (aš-šaʿb al-filasṭīnīy), Palestinians (al-filasṭīnīyūn) or Palestinian Arabs (al-ʿarab al-Filasṭīnīyūn)
- Etymology: Timeline of the name Palestine, Place names in Palestine
- ISO country codes: PS, PSE, 275
- ISO region codes: See ISO 3166-2:PS
- Internet country code top-level domain: .ps

== Geography of Palestine ==
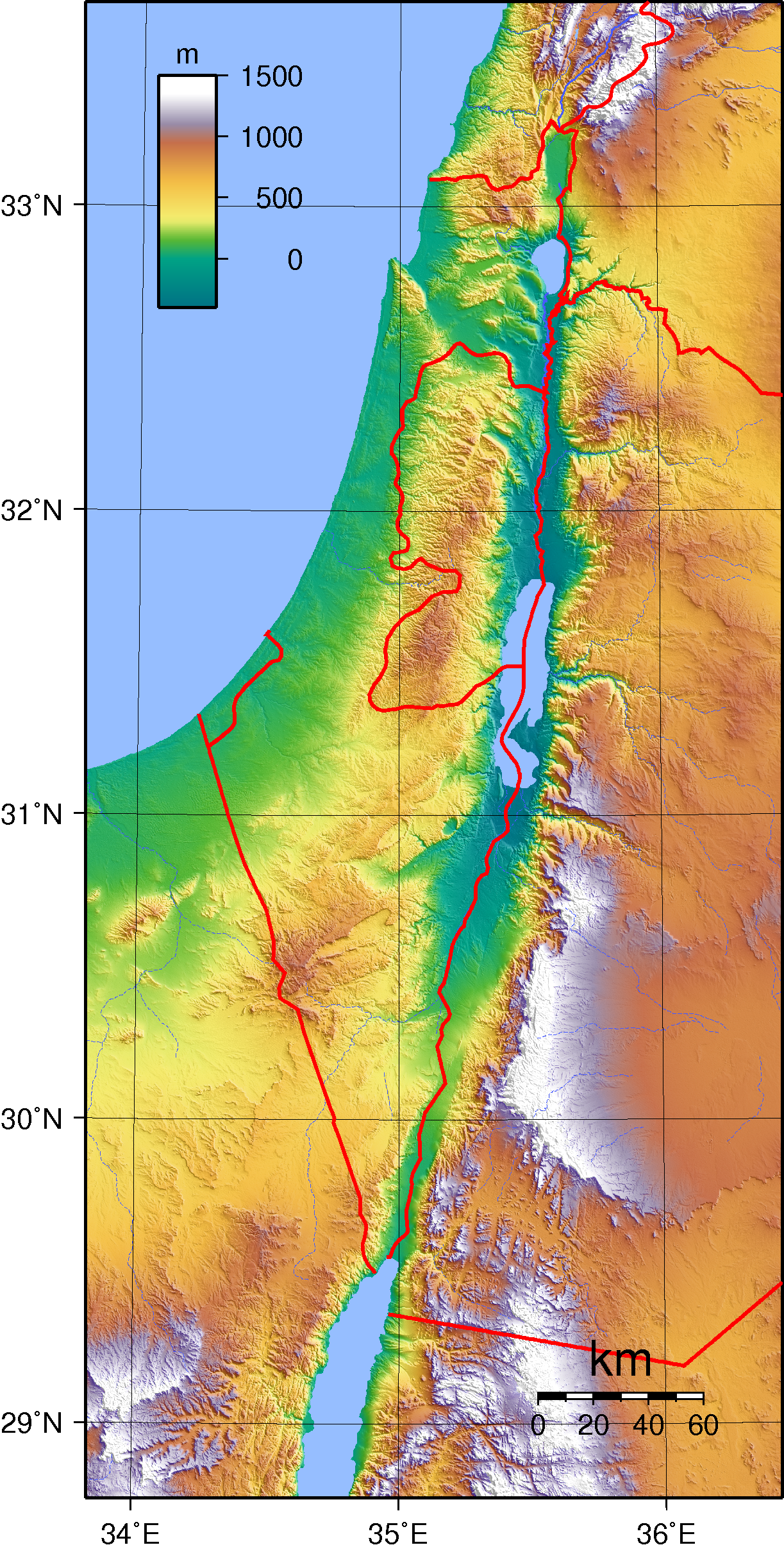
An enlargeable topographic map of Israel and Palestine. Outlined in red are the 1949-designated boundaries of the West Bank and Gaza Strip

- Palestine location:
  - Northern Hemisphere and Eastern Hemisphere
  - Eurasia
    - Asia
      - Southwest Asia
        - Middle East
  - Time zone: UTC+02, summer UTC+03
  - Extreme points of Palestine
    - High: Mount Nabi Yunis 1,030 m (3,379 ft)
    - Low: Dead Sea −412 m (−1,352 ft) – lowest point on the surface of the Earth
  - Land boundaries: Officially undefined, figures given are the de facto boundaries of the Green Line as they apply to the West Bank and Gaza Strip (See also Israeli West Bank barrier, Israeli Gaza Strip barrier and the Seam Zone)

- Total: 466 km (290 mi)

Israel 358 km (222 mi)
Jordan 97 km (60 mi)
Egypt 11 km (6.8 mi)

- Coastline (Gaza Strip): 40 km (25 mi)
- Coastline (West Bank): 0 km (0 mi)

Note: West Bank includes the northern portion of the Dead Sea with a 40 km (25 mi) shoreline.

- Population of Palestine:
  - Palestinian population worldwide, including diaspora: est. 10,000,000 - 11,000,000
  - Population of Palestine: est. 3,800,000
- Area of Palestine:
  - Palestine (post-2013): claimed area 6,220 km^{2} (2,400 sq mi) (de facto control of 2,488 km^{2} (961 sq mi)); The West Bank (including East Jerusalem) is (5,860 km^{2} (2,260 sq mi) and the Gaza Strip is 360 km^{2} (140 sq mi)
- Atlas of Palestine

=== Environment of Palestine ===
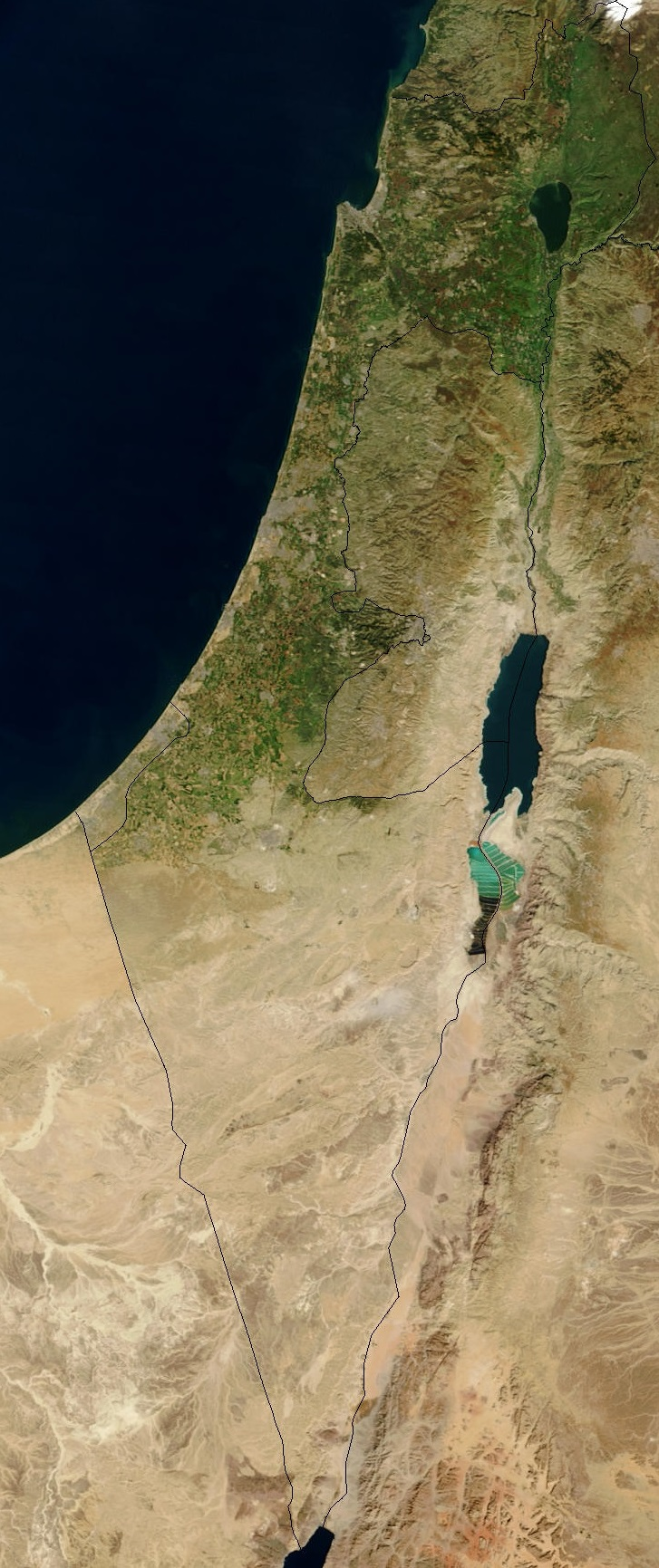
An enlargeable satellite image of Palestine and surrounding region.

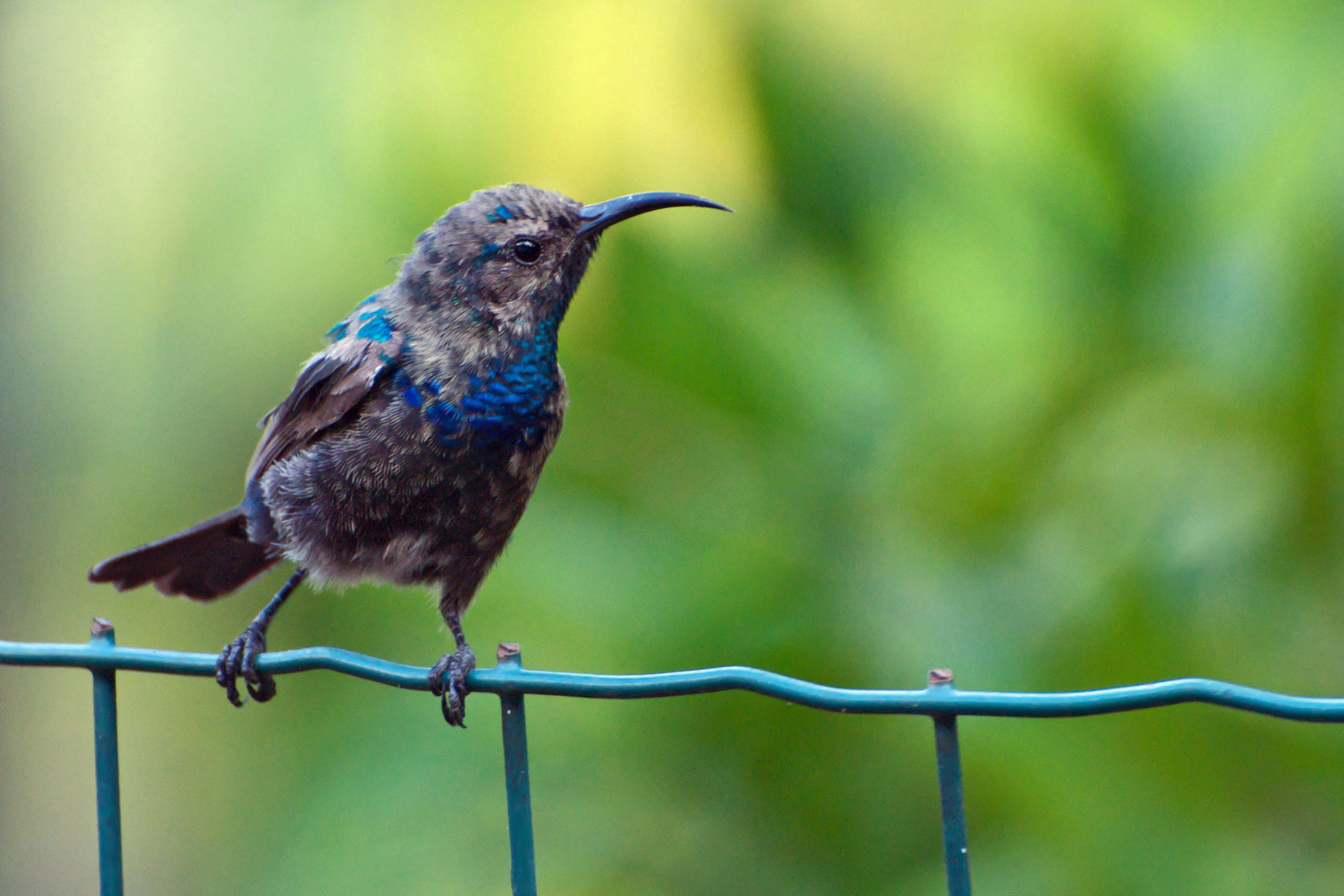
The Palestine sunbird, native to Palestine

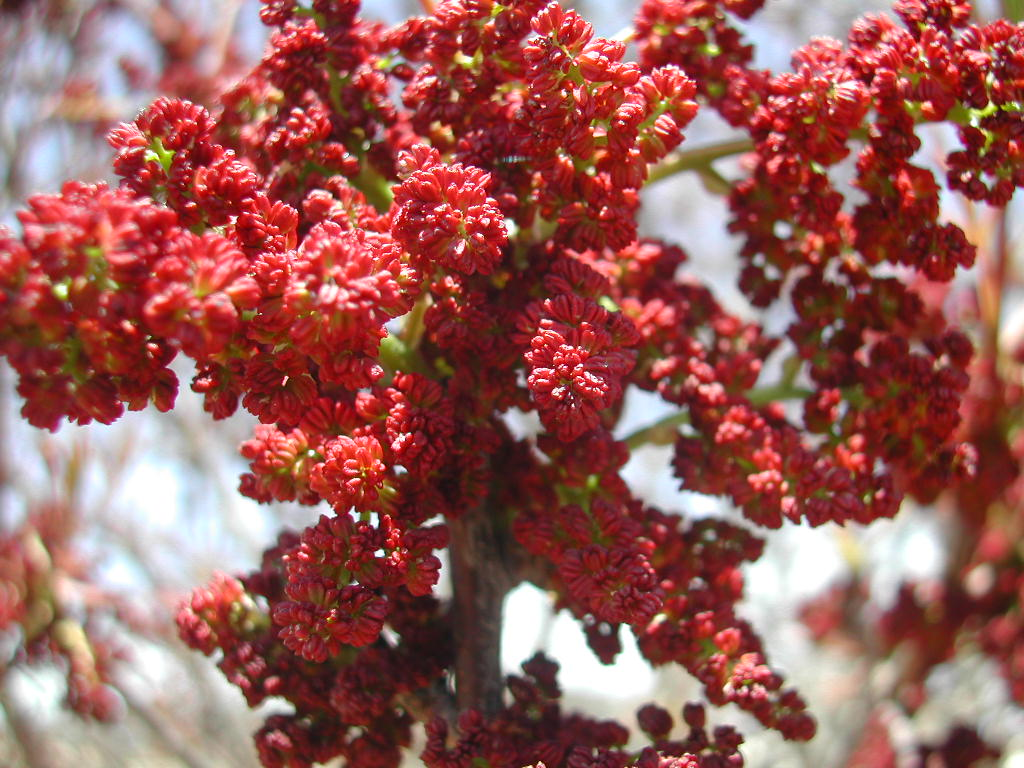
Inflorescence of the terebinth (Pistacia terebinthus), a tree native to Palestine

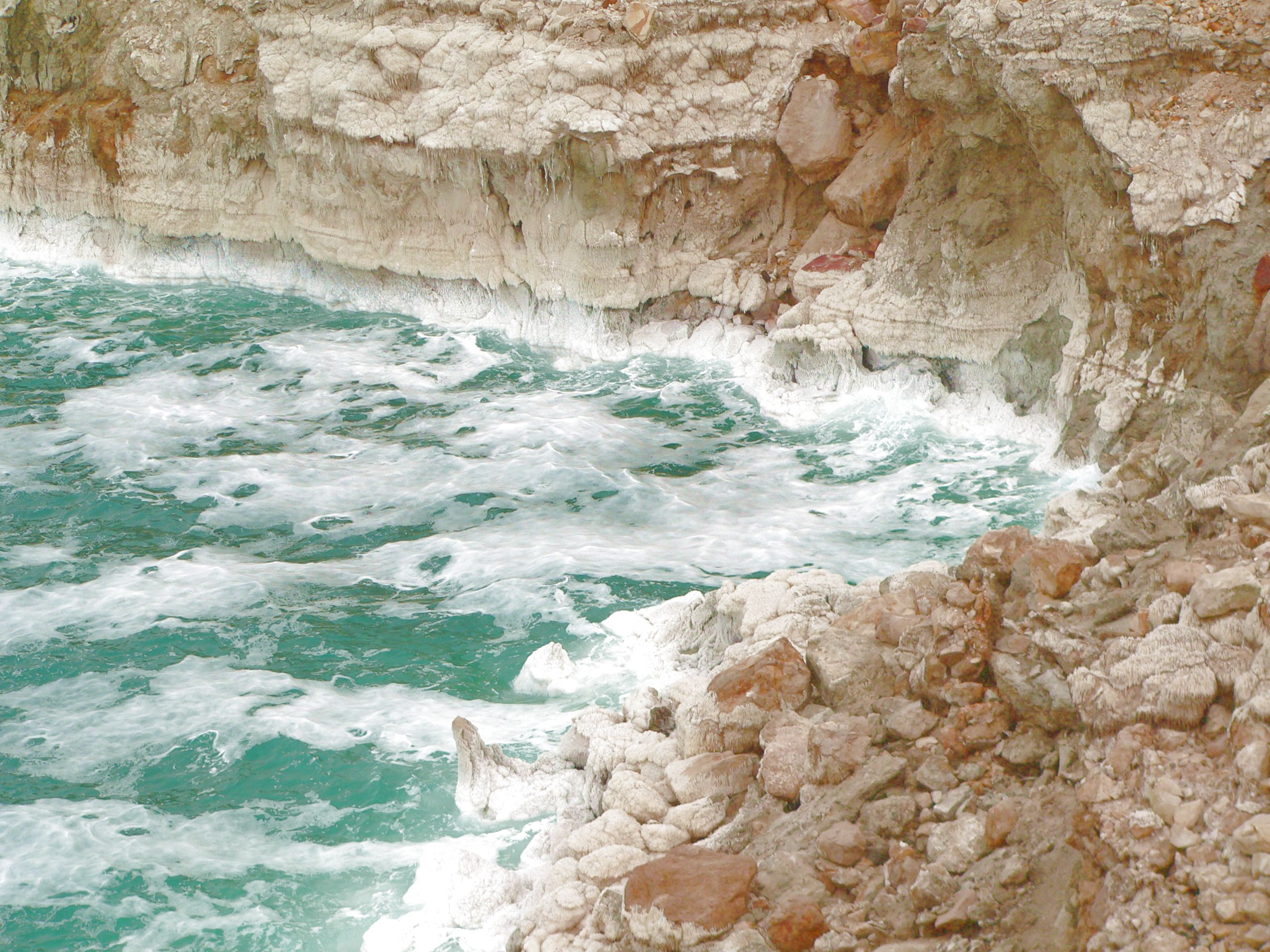
The Dead Sea on a rough day, with salt deposits on cliffs

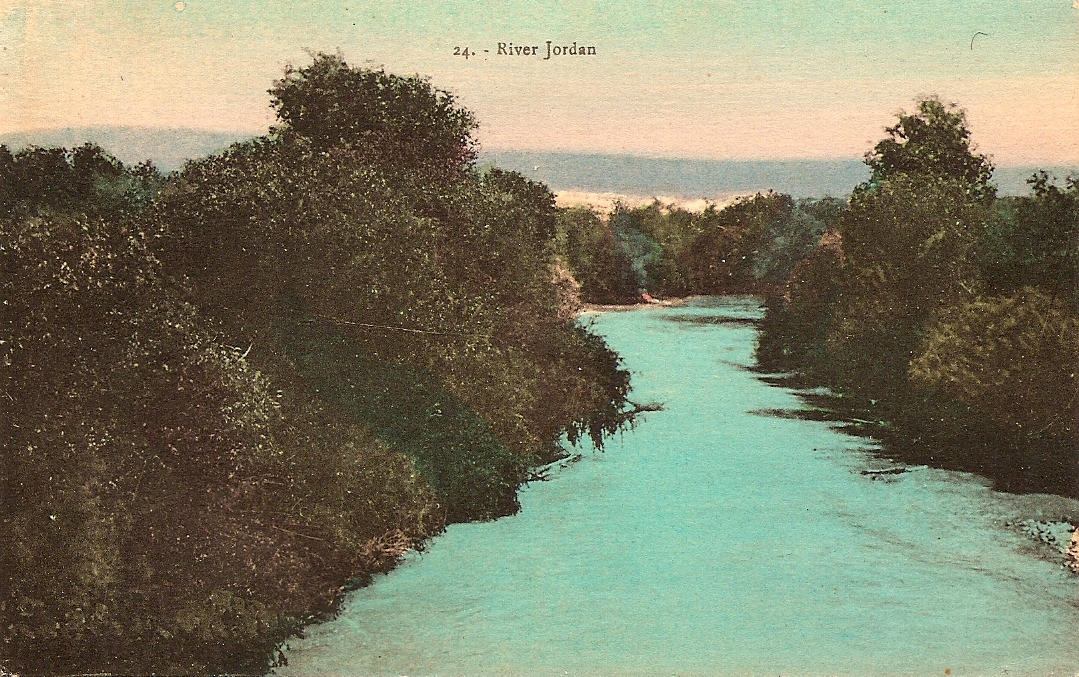
Colored postcard of the Jordan River by Karimeh Abbud circa 1925.

- Climate of Palestine
- List of ecoregions in Palestine
    - Eastern Mediterranean conifer-sclerophyllous-broadleaf forests
- Renewable energy in Palestine
  - Solar cookers in Gaza
- Geology of Palestine
  - Jerusalem stone
  - Meleke
- Protected areas of Palestine
  - Biosphere reserves in Palestine
  - National parks of Palestine
- Wildlife of Palestine
  - Flora of Palestine
    - List of native plants of Palestine (A-D)
    - List of native plants of Palestine (E-O)
    - List of native plants of Palestine (P-Z)
      - Opuntia
  - Fauna of Palestine
    - Banded newt
    - Calopteryx syriaca
    - Telescopus hoogstraali
    - Birds of Palestine
    - Mammals of Palestine
      - Marbled polecat
      - Striped hyena
- Palestinian Environmental NGOs Network

==== Natural geographic features of Palestine ====
- Glaciers of Palestine: N/A
- Islands of Palestine: N/A
- Lakes of Palestine
- List of seas in Palestine
  - Dead Sea
  - Mediterranean Sea
- Mountains of Palestine
  - Volcanoes in Palestine
- Rivers of Palestine
  - Jordan River
    - Water politics in the Jordan River basin
      - Headwater Diversion Plan (Jordan River)
  - Wadi Fa'rah
  - Waterfalls of Palestine
- Wells of Palestine
  - Jubb Yussef (Joseph's Well)
- Valleys of Palestine
  - Jordan Rift Valley
    - Jordan Valley
  - Wadi Qelt
  - Villages named for Wadis ("Valleys")
    - Wadi al-Arayis
    - Wadi Ara, Haifa (depopulated in 1948)
    - Wadi al-Far'a
    - Wadi Fukin

=== Regions of Palestine ===
Regions of Palestine

==== Ecoregions of Palestine ====
List of ecoregions in Palestine

==== Administrative divisions of Palestine ====
- West Bank Areas in the Oslo II Accord

===== Administrative divisions of Palestine =====
- Palestinian Governorates: 16 (11 in the West Bank, 5 in Gaza)
  - Jerusalem Governorate: Jerusalem District
  - Bethlehem Governorate: Bethlehem District
  - Deir Al-Balah Governorate: Deir Al-Balah District
  - Gaza Governorate: Gaza District
  - Hebron Governorate: Hebron District
  - Jenin Governorate: Jenin District
  - Jericho Governorate: Jericho District
  - Khan Yunis Governorate: Khan Younis District
  - Nablus Governorate: Nablus District
  - North Gaza Governorate: North Gaza District
  - Qalqilya Governorate: Qalqilya District
  - Rafah Governorate: Rafah District
  - Ramallah and Al-Bireh Governorate: Ramallah and Al-Bireh District
  - Salfit Governorate: Salfit District
  - Tubas Governorate: Tubas District
  - Tulkarm Governorate: Tulkarm District
- Cities under Palestinian administration
  - List of cities in the Gaza Strip

=== Demography of Palestine ===
- Demographics of Palestine
  - Palestinian Central Bureau of Statistics

== Government and politics of Palestine ==
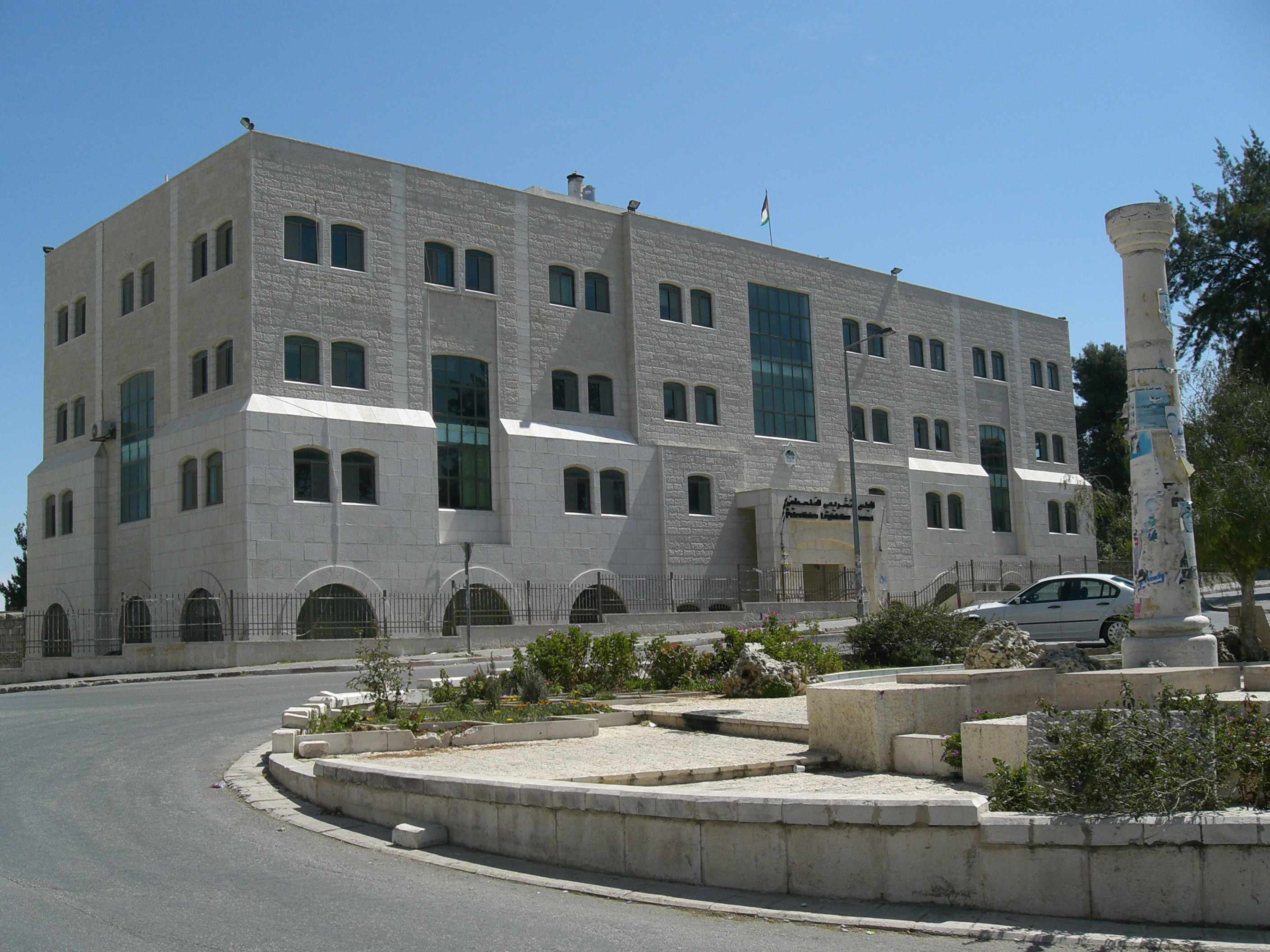
The building of the Palestinian Legislative Council in Ramallah

- Form of government: semi-presidential parliamentary democracy

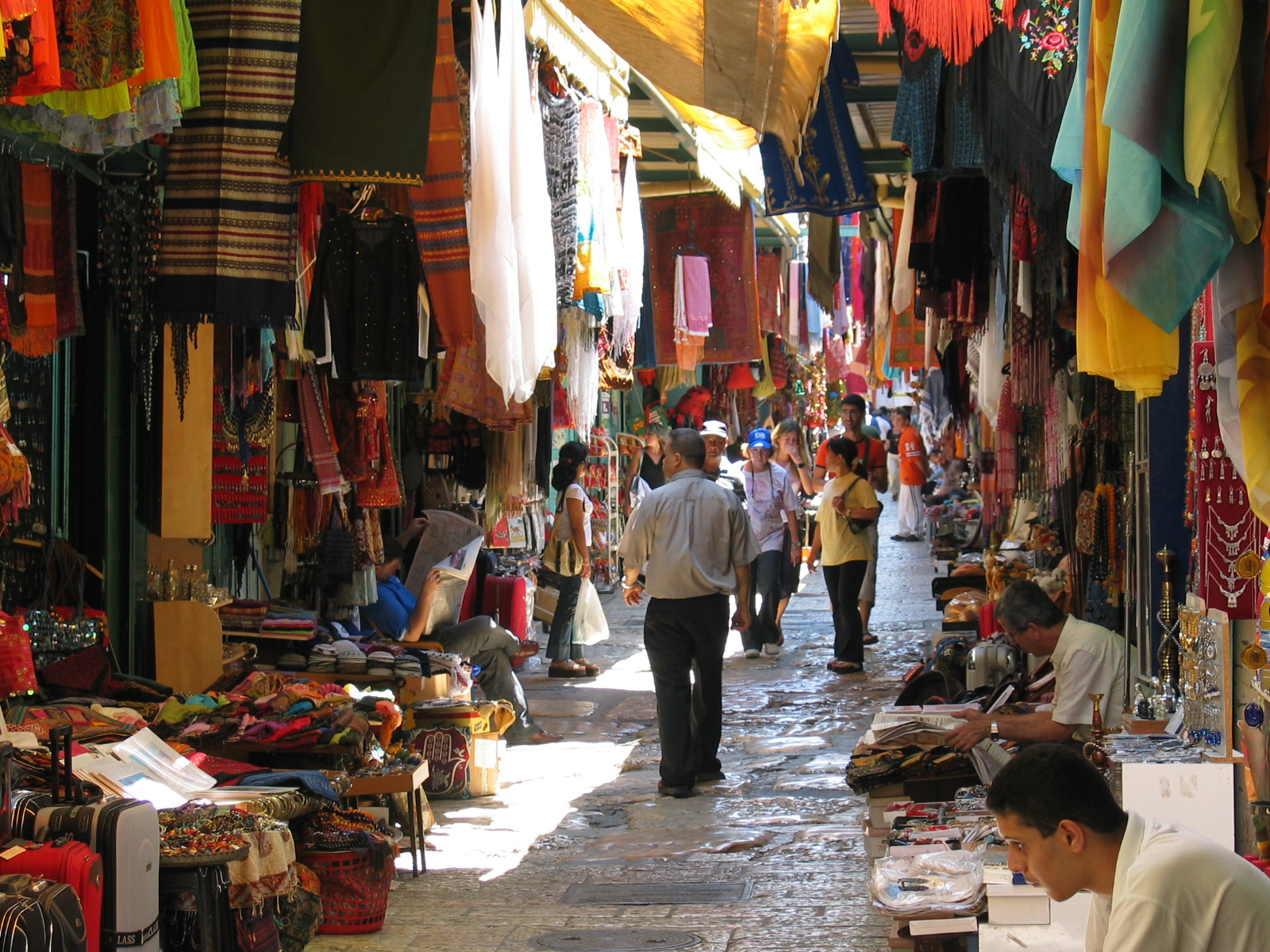
The souq in the Old City of Jerusalem, which both the Palestinians and Israelis proclaim as their capital

- Capital of Palestine:
  - Proclaimed capital: East Jerusalem (also proclaimed by Israel)
  - de facto capital: Ramallah
- Elections in Palestine
- Palestinian government
  - Palestinian government of 2013
  - Palestinian unity government of 2014
- List of political parties in Palestine
  - Political parties of the PLO
- Taxation in Palestine

=== Branches of the government of Palestine ===
  - President of Palestine: Mahmoud Abbas
  - Prime Minister of Palestine: Mohammad Mustafa
  - As a result of the Fatah-Hamas conflict, there is a dispute over the Presidency and Prime Ministership of Palestine.

=== Ministries ===
- Minister of Foreign Affairs and Expatriates
- Minister of Justice
- Minister of Interior
- Minister of Finance
- Ministry of Planning and International Cooperation
- Minister of Local Government
- Minister of Health
- Minister of Education and Higher Education
- Minister of Labor
- Minister of Awqaf and Religious Affairs
- Minister of Industry
- Minister of National Economy
- Minister of Telecommunications and Digital Economy
- Minister of Public Works and Housing
- Minister of Social Development
- Minister of Agriculture
- Minister of Tourism and Antiquities
- Minister of Jerusalem Affairs
- Minister of Culture
- Minister of Transport and Communications
- Minister of Women's Affairs

==== Legislative branches of the government of Palestine ====
- Palestinian Legislative Council (Palestine, unicameral)
- Palestinian National Council (PLO, unicameral, parliament-in-exile)

==== Judicial branch of the government of Palestine ====
- According to the Constitution of Palestine, all courts relating to the country shall be independent.

=== Local governance in Palestine ===
- Local governance in Palestine
- Mukataa

=== Foreign relations of Palestine ===
- Foreign relations of Palestine
  - Holy See – Palestinian relations
  - India-Palestine relations
  - Iran-Palestine relations
  - Palestine-Russia relations
  - Pakistan-Palestine relations
  - Romania-Palestine relations
- Diplomatic missions in Palestine
- List of diplomatic missions of Palestine

=== Palestine and the United Nations ===
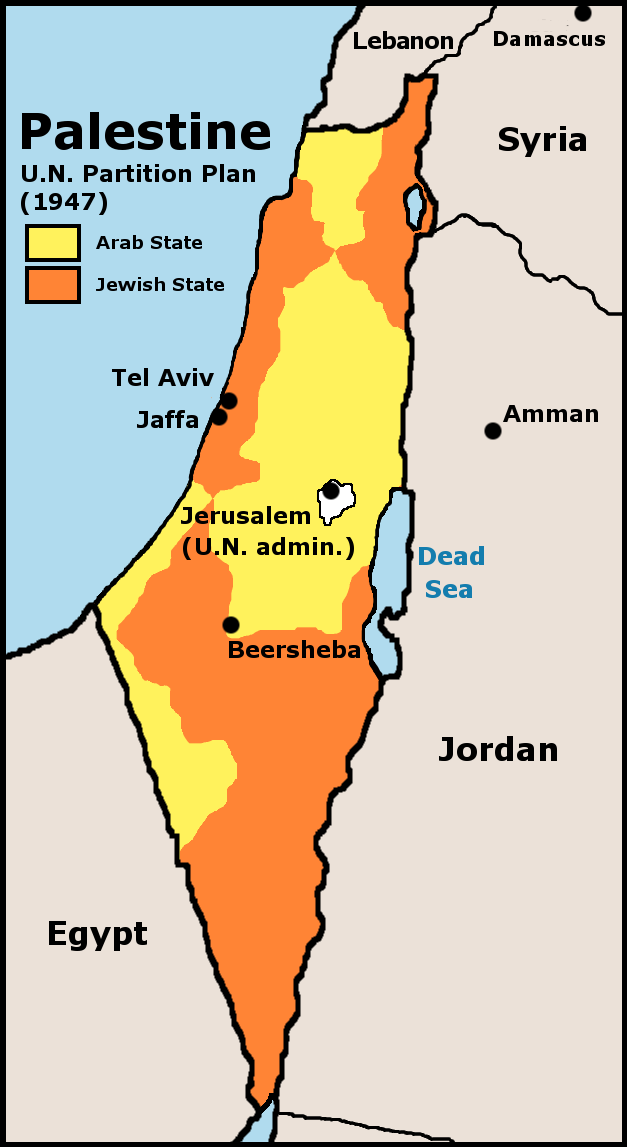
UN 1947 partition plan for Palestine

- United Nations Partition Plan for Palestine
- United Nations Palestine Commission
- United Nations Relief and Works Agency for Palestine Refugees in the Near East (UNRWA)
- United Nations resolutions concerning Palestine
- United Nations Special Committee on Palestine (UNSCOP)
- Committee on the Exercise of the Inalienable Rights of the Palestinian People
  - United Nations Division for Palestinian Rights (UNDPR)
- International Day of Solidarity with the Palestinian People
- Palestinian right of return
- Palestine and the United Nations

=== International organization membership ===
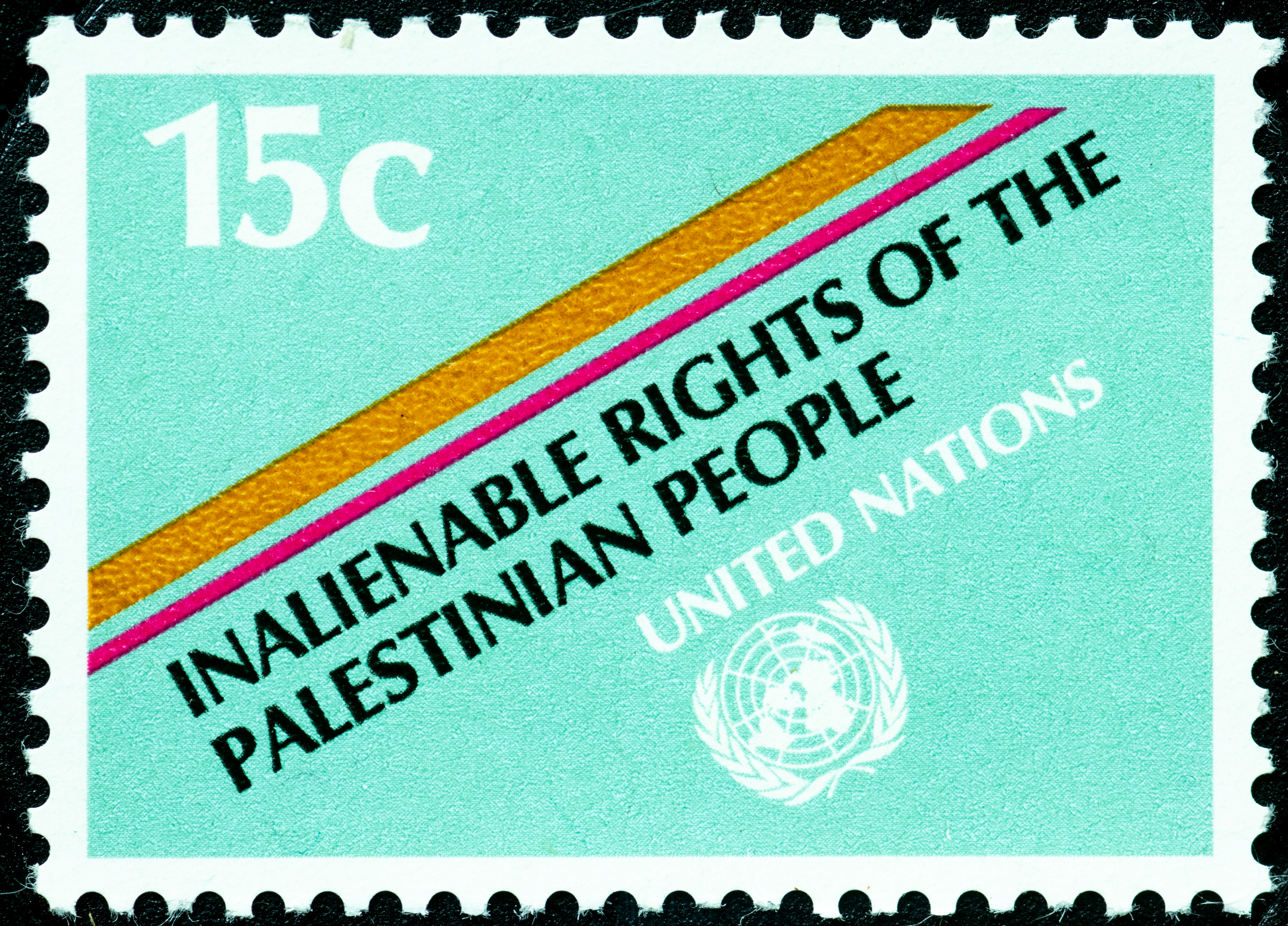
UN stamp commemorating the inalienable rights of the Palestinian people

Palestine is a member in a number of international organizations. In others, it enjoys affiliation in a lesser capacity or under another designation (such as PLO or Palestinian National Authority). In the list below, if the membership is not full or not for Palestine, the type and name of affiliation is denoted in parentheses.

- Arab Fund for Economic and Social Development (AFESD)
- Arab League (AL)
- Arab Monetary Fund (AMF)
- Council of Arab Economic Unity (CAEU)
- FIFA (Asian Football Confederation (AFC)
- Group of 77 (G77)
- International Olympic Committee (IOC)
- International Trade Union Confederation (ITUC) (affiliate member)
- International Telecommunication Union (ITU) (non-voting observer status)
- International Organization for Standardization (ISO)
- International Paralympic Committee (IPC)
- International Federation of Red Cross and Red Crescent Societies (IFRC)
- International Committee of the Red Cross (ICRC)
- Islamic Development Bank (IDC)
- Organisation of Islamic Cooperation (OIC)
- Non-Aligned Movement (NAM)
- United Nations (UN) (observer)
  - Asian Group of the United Nations
  - United Nations Economic and Social Commission for Western Asia (UNESCWA)
- UNESCO
- UNIDO
- Universal Postal Union (UPU)
- World Health Organization (WHO) (observer status)
- World Intellectual Property Organization (WIPO)
- OPCW
- ICC
- Interpol
- UNCTAD
- UNICEF
- IPU

=== International aid to Palestine ===
- International aid to Palestinians

=== International solidarity movements ===
- Palestinian solidarity organizations
  - Comités Palestine
  - Melbourne Palestine Solidarity Network
  - Palestine Solidarity Campaign
  - Palestine Solidarity Movement
  - Scottish Palestine Solidarity Campaign

=== Law and order in Palestine ===
Palestinian Law

- Palestinian National Charter
- Crime in Palestine
- Human rights in Palestine
  - Freedom of religion in Palestine
  - LGBT rights in Palestine
  - Polygamy in Palestine
  - Human rights organizations in Palestine
    - Al Mezan Center for Human Rights
    - Palestinian Centre for Human Rights
    - Palestinian Human Rights Monitoring Group
  - Human rights record of Israel in Palestine
    - International law and Israeli settlements
    - Law enforcement in Palestine
- Prostitution in Palestine

=== Military of Palestine ===
- Palestinian Security Services
  - Commander-in-chief: Mahmoud Abbas
  - Interior Minister: Ziad Hab al-Rih
- Military history of Palestine
  - Arab Liberation Army
  - Army of the Holy War
- Military ranks of Palestine

==== Paramilitary forces of Palestine ====
- Palestinian National Security Forces
- Palestinian Civil Police Force
- Palestinian Preventive Security
- Palestinian Presidential Guard
- General Intelligence

==== Irregular Palestinian forces ====
- Al-Aqsa Martyrs' Brigades (armed wing affiliated with Fatah)
- al-Quds Brigades (armed wing of Palestinian Islamic Jihad)
- Izz ad-Din al-Qassam Brigades (armed wing of Hamas)
- Popular Front for the Liberation of Palestine - General Command (PFLP-GC) (armed wing of the PFLP)
- Popular Resistance Committees
- Palestinian domestic weapons production
  - Qassam rocket
  - al-Quds rocket
    - Rocket and mortar attacks on southern Israel
  - Yassin RPG
  - Al-Bana RPG
  - Batar RPG

==== International civilian organizations in Palestine ====
- European Union Border Assistance Mission Rafah
- European Union Police Mission for the Palestinian Territories
- Temporary International Presence in Hebron

== History of Palestine ==
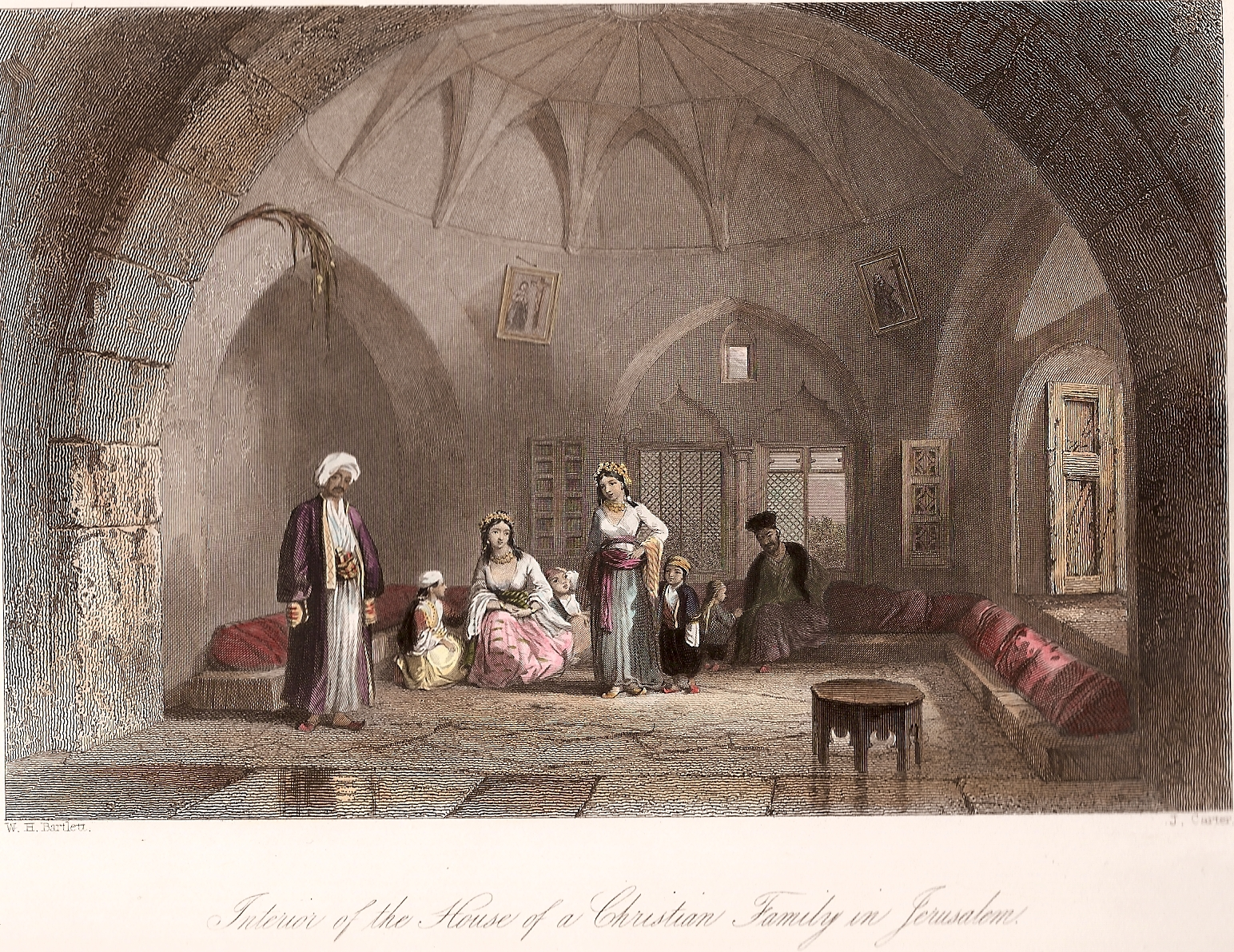
Interior of the house of a Palestinian Christian family in Jerusalem. By W. H. Bartlett, c. 1850

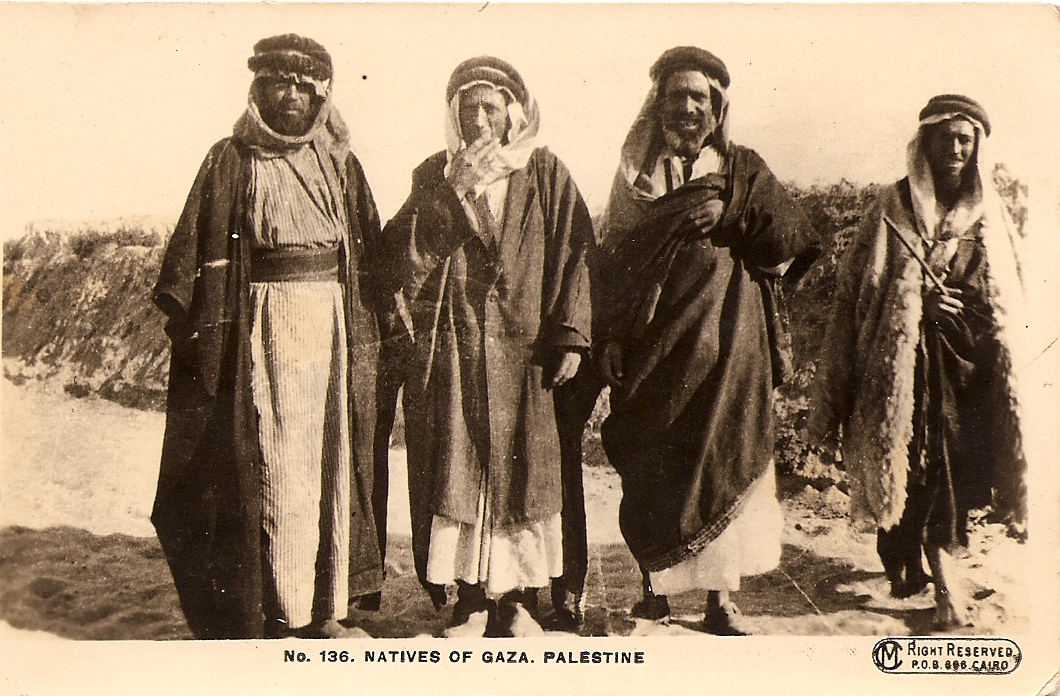
Old postcard of men native to Gaza, Palestine

- Postage stamps and postal history of Palestine
- Military history of Palestine
  - Sinai and Palestine Campaign (1915–1918)
  - Battle of Megiddo (1918)
  - 1920 Palestine riots
  - Jaffa riots
  - 1929 Palestine riots
  - 1936–1939 Arab revolt in Palestine
  - Bombing of Palestine in World War II
  - 1948 Palestine war
  - 1948 Palestinian expulsion and flight
  - 1949–56 Palestinian exodus
    - Kfar Qasim massacre
  - 1967 War
  - 1967 Palestinian exodus
  - Battle of Karameh
  - Black September in Jordan (1970)
  - Lebanese Civil War
    - 1982 Lebanon War
    - Sabra and Shatila massacre
  - Second Intifada (2000–05)
    - Battle of Jenin (2002)
    - Battle of Nablus (2002)
    - Siege of the Church of the Nativity in Bethlehem (2002)
  - Gaza–Israel conflict
- Political history of Palestine
  - Partitioning of the Ottoman Empire
  - History of the Israeli–Palestinian conflict
  - British Mandate Palestine
  - Arab Higher Committee
  - All-Palestine Government
  - Palestine Liberation Organization
  - Israeli–Palestinian peace process
  - Palestinian National Authority
  - Road map for peace

== Palestinian culture ==
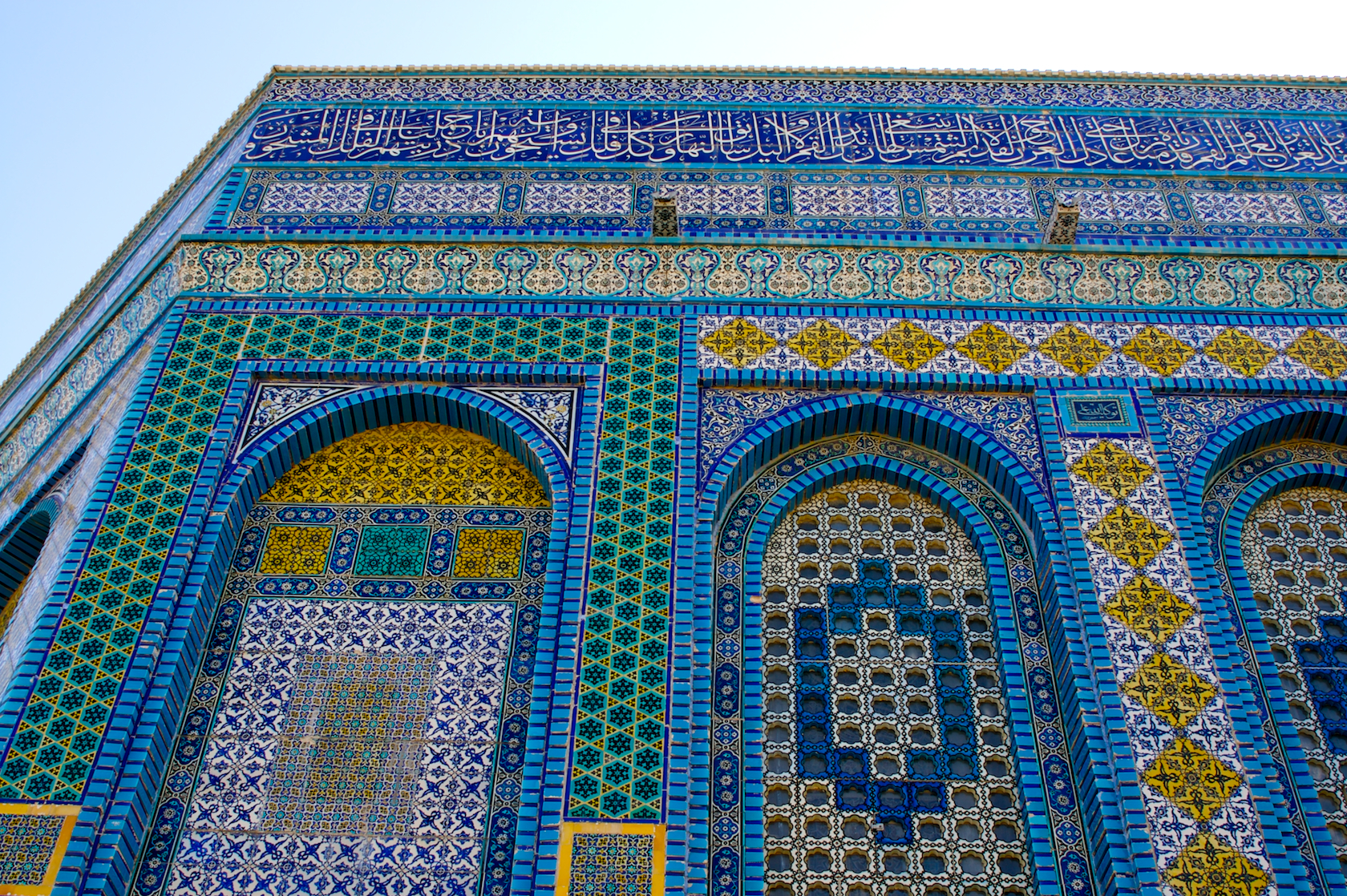
Mosaic detailing on the Dome of the Rock in the Old City of Jerusalem

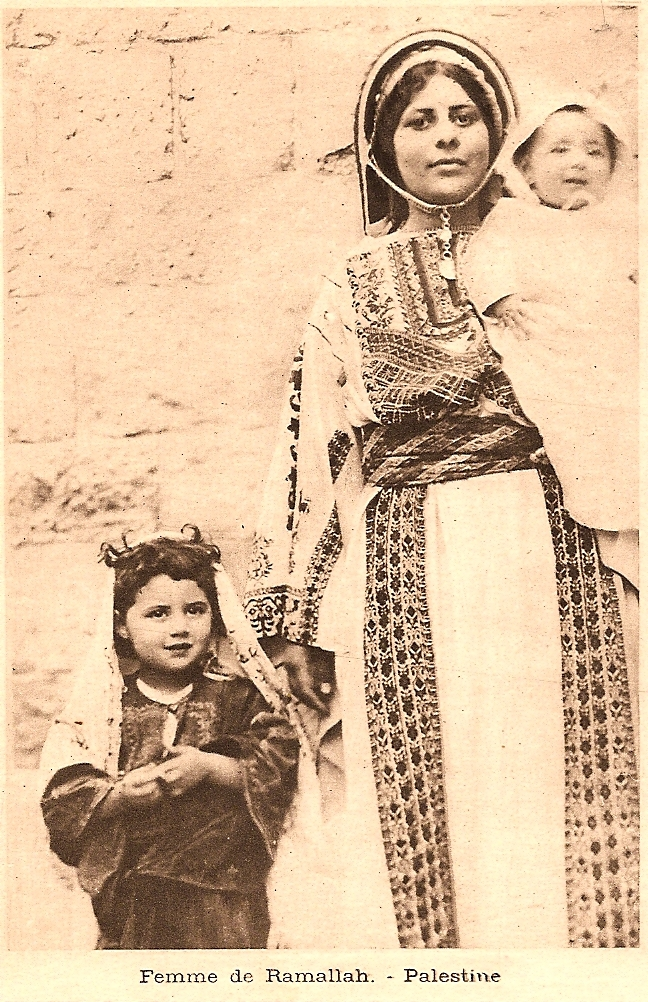
Old postcard depicting a woman, in traditional Palestinian costume, and children from Ramallah, British Mandate of Palestine

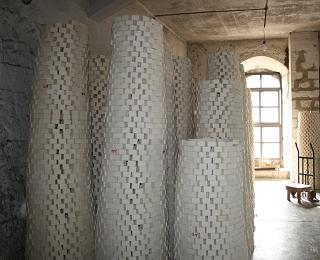
Nabulsi soap, a Palestinian handicraft, stacked for drying in "Camel" factory in Nablus in 2008

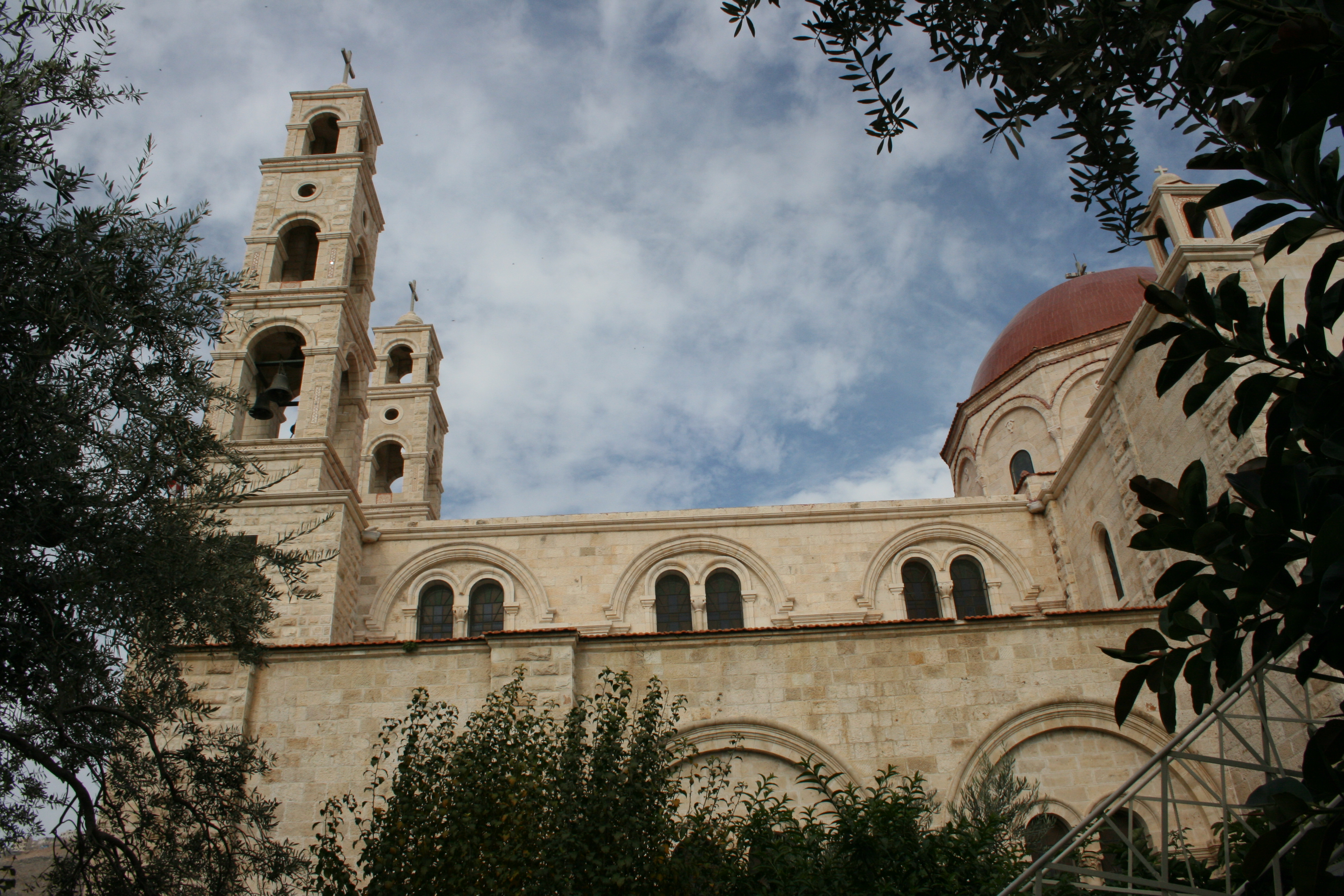
The Church of Bir Ya'acub (Jacob's Well) in Nablus, West Bank

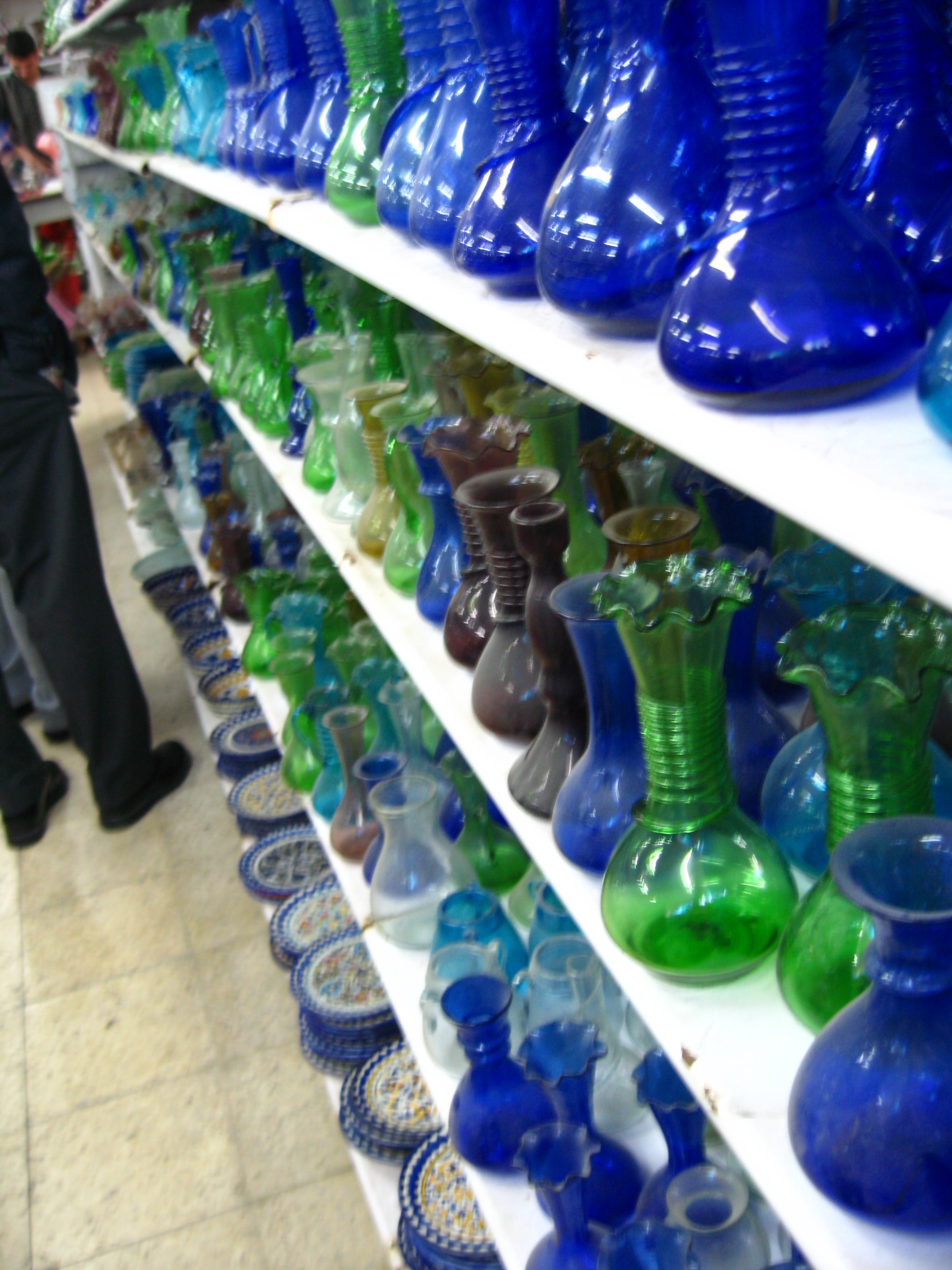
Hebron glass on display in a shop in Hebron, West Bank

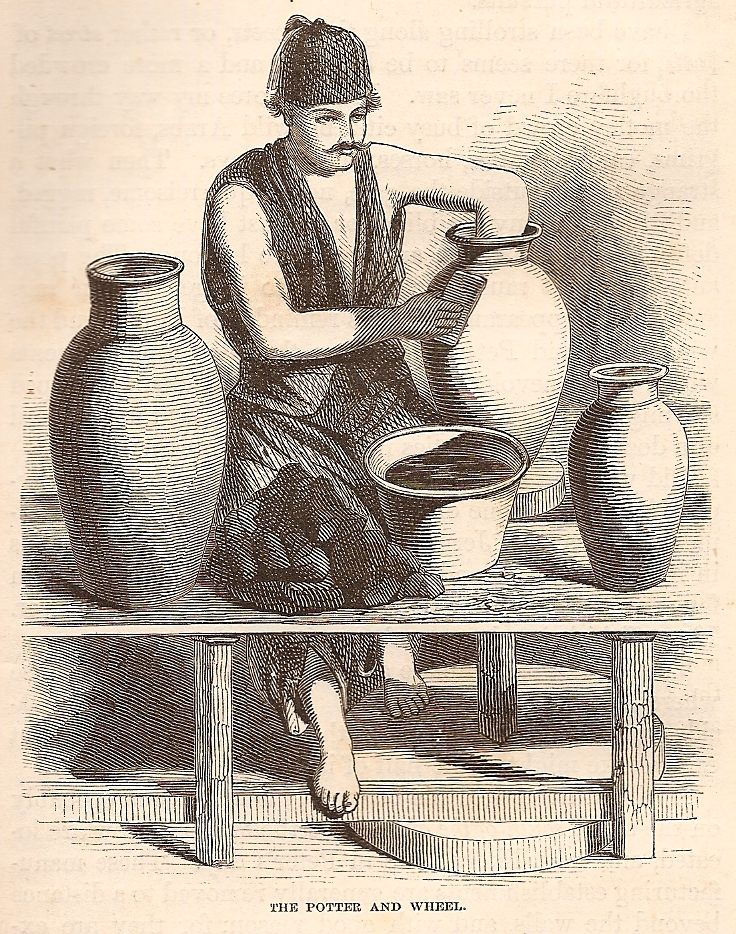
An artist's rendering of Palestinian pottery practices in Jaffa, Palestine in 1859, entitled, "The Potter and Wheel"

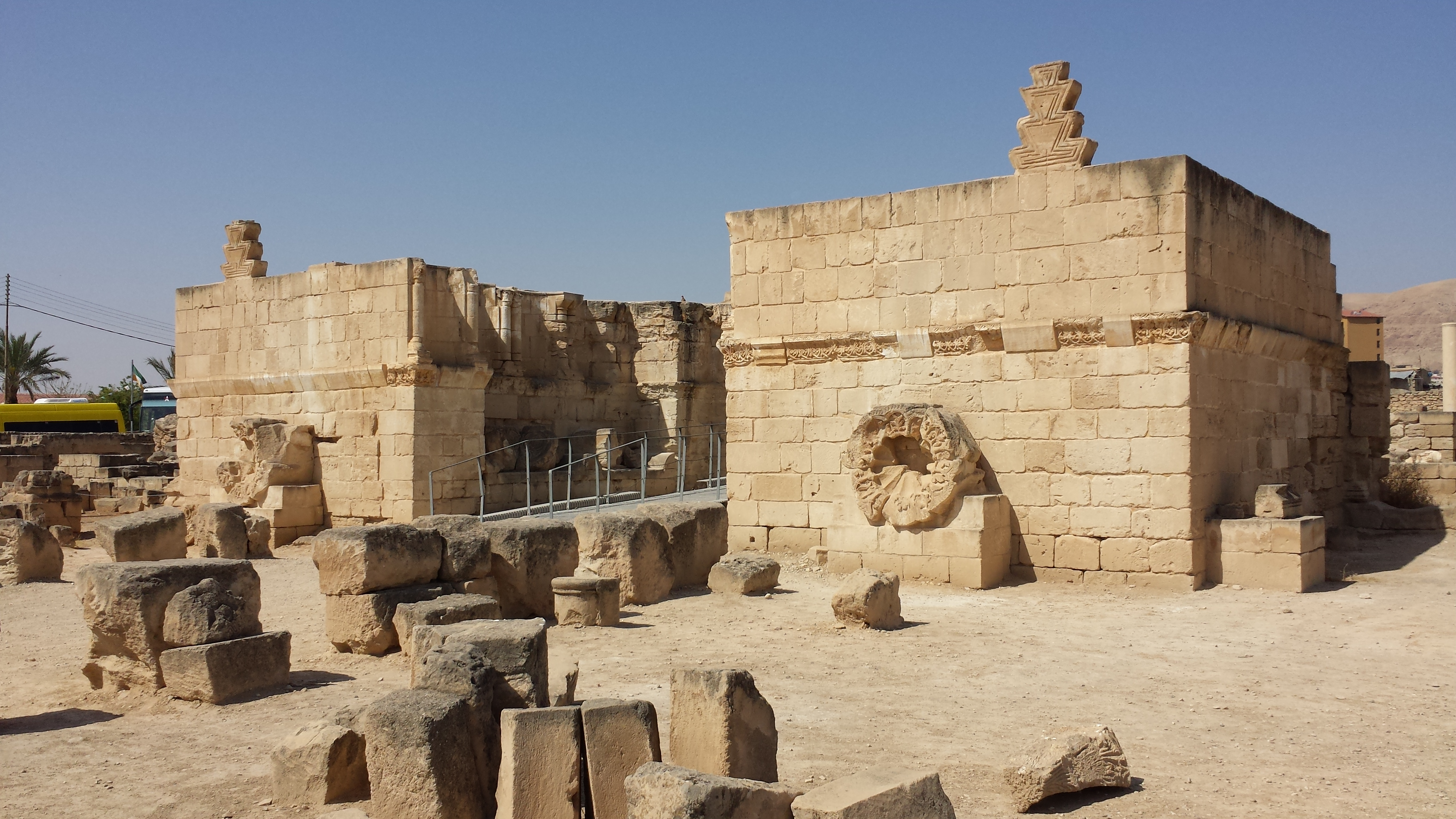
The ruins of Khirbet al-Mafjar (also known as Hisham's Palace), an Umayyad era palace in Jericho, West Bank

- Archaeology in Palestine
  - Gaza Museum of Archaeology
  - List of archaeological sites in the Gaza Strip
- Architecture of Palestine
  - Abd al-Hadi Palace
  - Hisham's Palace (Khirbet al-Mafjar)
  - Jacir Palace
  - Khan al-Tujjar (Nablus)
  - Khirbat al-Minya
  - Manara Clock Tower
  - Qasr al-Basha
- Palestinian culture
- Palestinian costumes
- Palestinian cuisine
  - Al-Quds Capital of Arab Culture
  - Boston Palestine Film Festival
  - Chicago Palestine Film Festival
  - Feast of Saint George
  - Khader Grape Festival
  - Thursday of the Dead
  - Palestine Festival of Literature
  - Nabi Musa (pre-1948)
  - Nabi Rubin (pre-1948)
  - Al-Nabi Yusha' (pre-1948)
- Languages of Palestine
  - Palestinian Arabic
- Communications in Palestine
  - Print media of Palestine
    - Al-Ayyam
    - Al-Hadaf
    - Electronic Intifada
    - Gaza Weekly Newspaper
    - Al-Hayat al-Jadida
    - Al-Hurriya
    - International Middle East Media Center
    - Al-Karmil
    - Palestine News Network
    - Palestine Times
    - Al-Quds
    - Al-Quds Al-Arabi
    - Filistin Ashabab
    - Sawt al-Jamahir
  - Palestinian Broadcasting Corporation
  - Radio in Palestine
    - Near East Broadcasting Station
    - RAM FM (West Bank)
    - Voice of Palestine
  - Television in Palestine
    - Al Aqsa TV
    - Palestinian Satellite Channel
- National symbols of Palestine
  - Coat of arms of Palestine
  - Palestinian Flag
  - Keffiyeh
  - National anthem of Palestine
  - Palestinian nationalism
  - Sumud
- Palestinians
  - Internally displaced Palestinians
  - Palestinian diaspora
  - Palestinian prisoners in Israel
  - Palestinian refugees
  - Prominent Palestinians
- National holidays of Palestine
  - Land Day
  - Nakba Day
  - Naksa Day
- Records of Palestine
- Religion in Palestine
  - Christianity in Palestine
    - Eastern Orthodox
      - Greek Orthodox Church
        - Brotherhood of the Holy Sepulchre
          - Greek Orthodox Patriarch of Jerusalem
            - Arab Orthodox
              - Church of the Nativity
              - Church of Saint Porphyrius
              - Monastery of Saint George, al-Khader
              - Monastery of the Temptation
    - Oriental Orthodoxy
      - Armenian Patriarch of Jerusalem
    - Latin Rite
      - Latin Patriarch of Jerusalem
        - Church of Saint Lazarus, Al-Eizariya
    - Eastern Catholic Churches
      - Melkite Greek Catholic Church
    - Anglican Communion
      - Episcopal Church in Jerusalem and the Middle East
        - Anglican-German Bishopric in Jerusalem
          - Anglican Bishop of Jerusalem
    - Protestantism
      - Presbyterianism
        - Sabeel
        - Church of Scotland
          - St Andrew's Church, Jerusalem
    - Church of the Holy Sepulchre
  - Islam in Palestine
    - Ahmadiyya in Palestine
    - Waqf
      - Jerusalem Islamic Waqf
        - Al-Aqsa
          - Al-Aqsa Mosque
          - Dome of the Rock
            - Dome of the Chain
          - Excavations at the Temple Mount
        - Imaret
          - Hasseki Sultan Imaret
      - Moroccan Quarter
      - Sabil Abu Nabbut
      - List of mosques in Palestine
        - Great Mosque of Gaza
        - Great Mosque of Nablus
        - Al-Hamadiyya Mosque
        - Ibn Marwan Mosque
        - Ibn Uthman Mosque
        - Al-Khadra Mosque
        - Mahmoudiya Mosque
        - Mosque of Omar (Bethlehem)
        - An-Nasr Mosque
        - Sayed al-Hashim Mosque
        - Sultan Ibrahim Ibn Adham Mosque
        - Umm al-Naser Mosque
        - Welayat Mosque
    - Supreme Muslim Council
  - Sites holy to Christians, Jews, and Muslims
    - Cave of the Patriarchs (Al-Haram Al-Ibrahimi)
    - Joseph's Tomb
    - Jacob's Well (also holy to Samaritans)
    - Rachel's Tomb (Bilal ibn Rabah)
    - Tomb of Samuel (Nabi Samwil)
  - Judaism in Palestine
    - Palestinian synagogues
      - Ancient Synagogue of Gaza
  - Samaritans in Palestine
  - Ahmadiyya in Palestine

=== Art in Palestine ===
- Palestinian art
  - Museums in Palestine
    - Badd Giacaman Museum
    - Baituna al-Talhami Museum
- Cinema of Palestine
  - Cinema Jenin
- Palestinian handicrafts
- Palestinian literature
- Music of Palestine
- Palestinian pottery
  - Ataaba
  - The Edward Said National Conservatory of Music
  - Palestinian hip hop
- Palestinian Theatre
  - Al-Kasaba Theatre
  - Palestinian National Theatre

=== Sports in Palestine ===
Sport in Palestine

- Football in Palestine
  - Palestine national football team
  - Palestinian Football Federation
    - Faisal Al-Husseini International Stadium
    - Palestine Stadium
- Hammams (bathhouses)
  - Hamam al-Sammara
- Palestine Olympic Committee
  - Palestine at the Olympics
- Palestine at the Paralympics
- Palestinian Scout Association
- Girl Guides of Palestine

== Economy and infrastructure of Palestine ==
- Economy of Palestine
  - Economy of Gaza

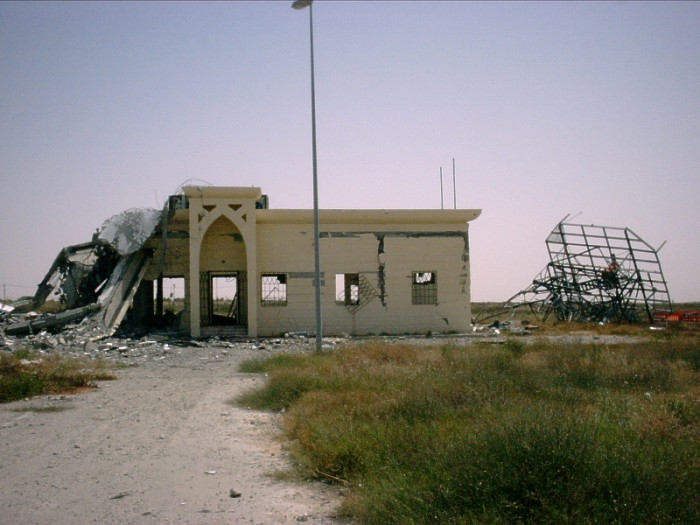
The Yasser Arafat International Airport in Gaza. Severely damaged by an Israeli airstrike in 2001, the airport has remained closed ever since.

- Economic rank, by nominal GDP (2007): 134th (one hundred and thirty fourth)
- Agriculture in Palestine
- Banking in Palestine
  - Arab Bank
  - National Bank of Palestine
- Communications in Palestine
  - Internet in Palestine
  - Telephone numbers in Palestine
- List of companies of Palestine
  - G.ho.st
  - Palestinian Airlines (defunct)
  - Paltel
  - Taybeh Brewery
- National Trade Union of Palestine
- Fair Trade organizations in Palestine
  - Canaan Fair Trade
  - Palestine Fair Trade Association
  - Zaytoun
- Currency of Palestine: dinar/sheqel
  - ISO 4217: JOD/ILS
- Energy in Palestine
- Mining in Palestine
- Public squares in Palestine
  - Manger Square
  - Palestine Square
  - Soldier's Square
- Tourism in Palestine
  - Alternative Tourism Group
- Transport in Palestine
  - List of airports in Palestine
    - Yasser Arafat International Airport (1998–2001)
  - Rail transport in Palestine
  - Port of Gaza
  - Roads in Palestine
    - Highway 57
    - Omar Mukhtar Street
    - Star Street
    - Wehda Street
- Water supply and sanitation in Palestine
- Palestine Stock Exchange

== Healthcare in Palestine ==
- Healthcare in Palestine
  - Palestine Red Crescent Society
  - Augusta Victoria Hospital
  - Al-Shifa Hospital

== Housing in Palestine ==
- Housing in Palestine
  - House demolition in the Israeli–Palestinian conflict
  - Palestinian refugee camps

== Education in Palestine ==
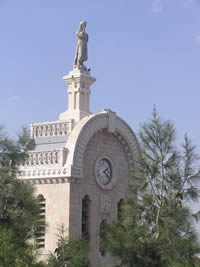
The main building of Bethlehem University in Bethlehem, West Bank

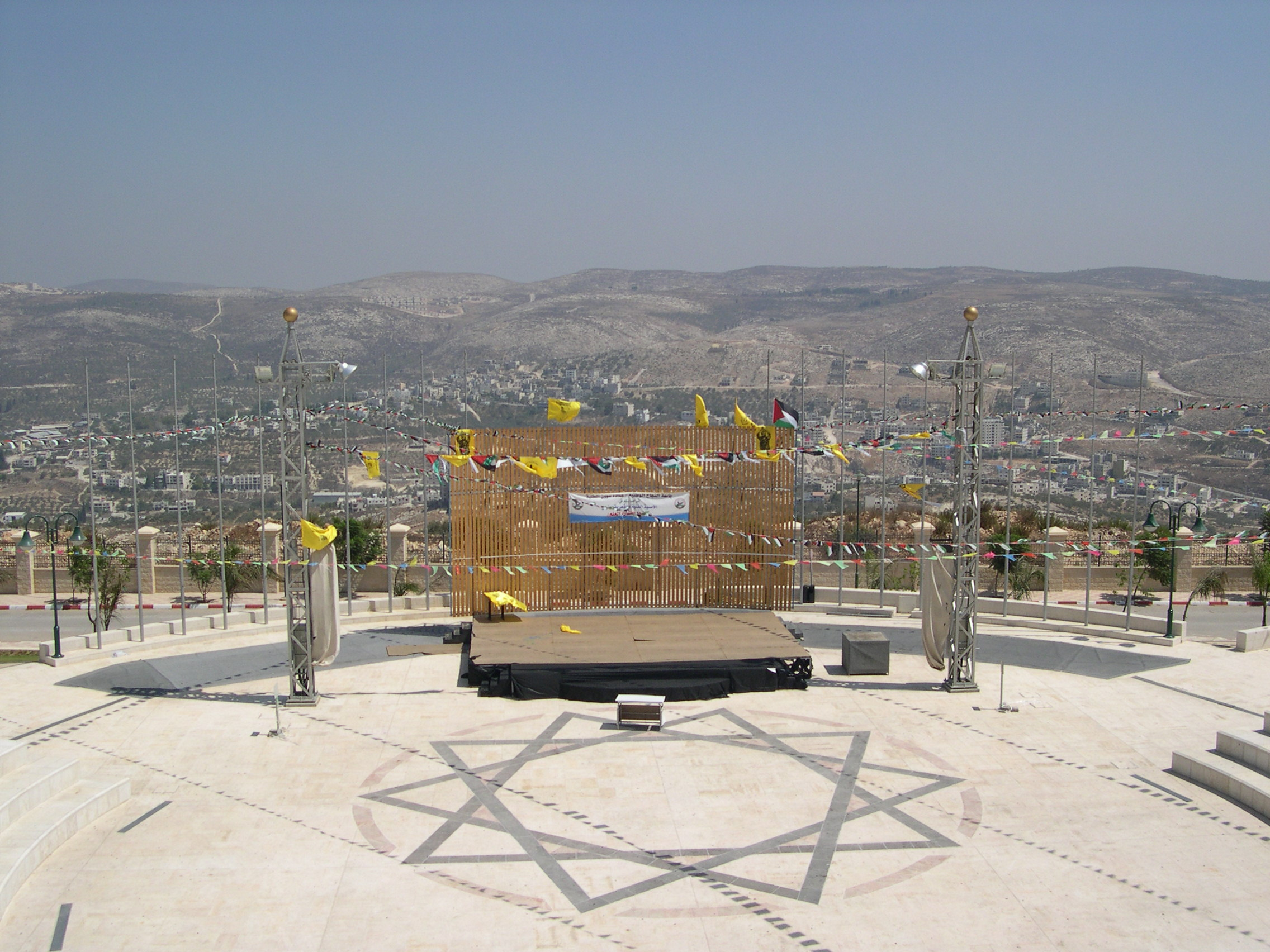
The amphitheatre of An-Najah National University overlooking the city of Nablus, West Bank

- Education in Palestine
- Education Ministry
- Universities and colleges of Palestine
  - Student organizations in Palestine
    - General Union of Palestinian Students
    - Palestinian Youth Association for Leadership and Rights Activation
    - Progressive Student Labor Front
    - Students Liberation Bloc
  - Student organizations supporting Palestine
    - Palestinian cultural club
    - Palestine Solidarity Movement
    - Solidarity for Palestinian Human Rights

== Books on Palestine ==
- Correcting a Mistake: Jews and Arabs in Palestine/Israel, 1936-1956
- The Ethnic Cleansing of Palestine
- Palestine (comics)
- Palestine Peace Not Apartheid
- Underground to Palestine

== See also ==
- List of international rankings
- List of Palestine-related topics
- List of years in Palestine
- Gaza war
- Outline of Asia
- Outline of geography
- Outline of Israel

== Bibliography ==
- Roberto Remo Bissio, ed. (1995). The world: a Third World guide 1995-96 (Illustrated ed.). Instituto del Tercer Mundo. ISBN 9780855982911.
- Milton-Edwards, Beverley (2008), The Israeli-Palestinian Conflict: A People's War (Illustrated ed.), Taylor & Francis, ISBN 9780415410434
- Kogan Page (2004). Middle East Review (27th, illustrated ed.). Kogan Page Publishers. ISBN 9780749440664.
- Said, Edward W.; Hitchens, Christopher (2001), Blaming the victims: spurious scholarship and the Palestinian question (2nd, illustrated ed.), Verso, ISBN 9781859843406
- Sela, Avraham; Ma'oz, Moshe (1997), The PLO and Israel: from armed conflict to political solution, 1964-1994 (Illustrated ed.), Palgrave Macmillan, ISBN 9780312129064
