= Students Liberation Bloc =

Palestinian students organization

Students Liberation Bloc (Arabic: كتلة التحرير الطلابية) is a Palestinian students organization. It is the student wing of the Palestinian Liberation Front.

In 2008, the Bloc won two seats in the elections to the students council at Al-Quds University.
