= Ahmadiyya in Palestine =

Islamic movement

The Ahmadiyya, who are not recognized as genuine Muslims by mainstream Muslims, face persecution in areas controlled by the Palestinian Authority and experience matrimonial restrictions imposed by local Sharia courts. Although no estimates are available, reports suggest that there may be "dozens" of Ahmadi Muslims in the West Bank.

== History ==
The Ahmadiyya Muslim Community in Palestine shares its earliest history with the history of the Ahmadiyya Muslim Community in Israel, when the second caliph of the Community, Mirza Basheer-ud-Din Mahmood Ahmad toured the Middle East in 1924 and visited Jerusalem, in what was then the British Mandate of Palestine. The first converts to the movement belonged to the Odeh tribe who originated from Ni'lin a small village, north-west of Jerusalem. In the 1950s, after the establishment of Israel, many Palestinian Ahmadis left Ni'lin and settled in Haifa, Israel.

== Modern status ==
=== West Bank ===
Ahmadi Muslims have reported of cases in which the local Sharia courts have dissolved marriages of several Ahmadi couples, leaving them in a legal limbo. In Tulkarem, an Ahmadi couple was branded apostate by a local court who annulled their marriage. Another couple from the same town in which only the husband was an Ahmadi met a similar fate.

In February 2014, the Palestinian General Investigation Service in Hebron arrested 3 Ahmadi Muslims when they attempted to obtain permission in order to distribute leaflets related to their faith. Accused of inciting sectarian strife, they were referred to the General Prosecution for investigation. A court issued a decision to extend their detention pending investigation. Within a few days, the Palestinian police in Hebron arrested 8 more Ahmadi Muslims on the grounds of distributing leaflets. They all later appeared before Hebron's Magistrates' court that issued a decision to extend their detention to 15 more days.

=== Gaza Strip ===
There is no significant presence of Ahmadis in Gaza.

== See also ==
- Islam in Palestine
