= Filistin Ashabab =

Magazine of Palestine

Filistin Ashabab فلسطين الشباب
- Editor: Tarik Hamdan
- Categories: culture, art, literature
- Frequency: Monthly
- First issue: January 2007
- Company: Jeel Publishing
- Country: Palestine
- Based in: Ramallah
- Language: Arabic
- Website: www.filistinashabab.com

Filistin Ashabab (Arabic: فلسطين الشباب "Palestine Youth" ) is a Palestinian monthly magazine. Launched in 2007, Filistin Ashabab is a free cultural magazine giving the youth in Palestine and in the diaspora a field of expression and access to the culture. It is distributed in all Palestine.

== Cultural initiatives ==
In 2009, the magazine extends to a weekly radio program Filistin Ashabab Radio on the local radio Raya FM.
