= Comités Palestine =

Comités Palestine ('Palestine Committees') was a movement in France for solidarity with the Palestinian people. Comités Palestine was founded in September 1970. The membership of Comités Palestine consisted largely of North African students and workers. A large share of the membership of Comités Palestine was recruited at universities from former members of the Comités Vietnam de base. Comités Palestine was closely linked to Gauche prolétarienne ('Proletarian Left'). Comités Palestine was particularly active in Paris and Marseille. Comités Palestine collected funds for the Palestinian Red Crescent.
