= Transport in Palestine =

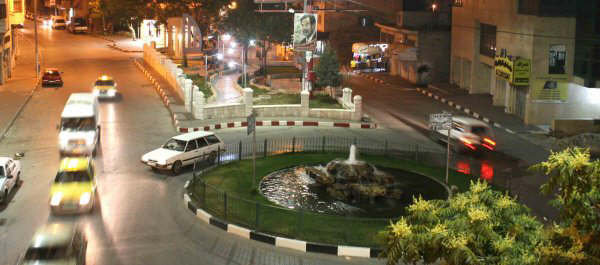
King Faisal Street in Hebron

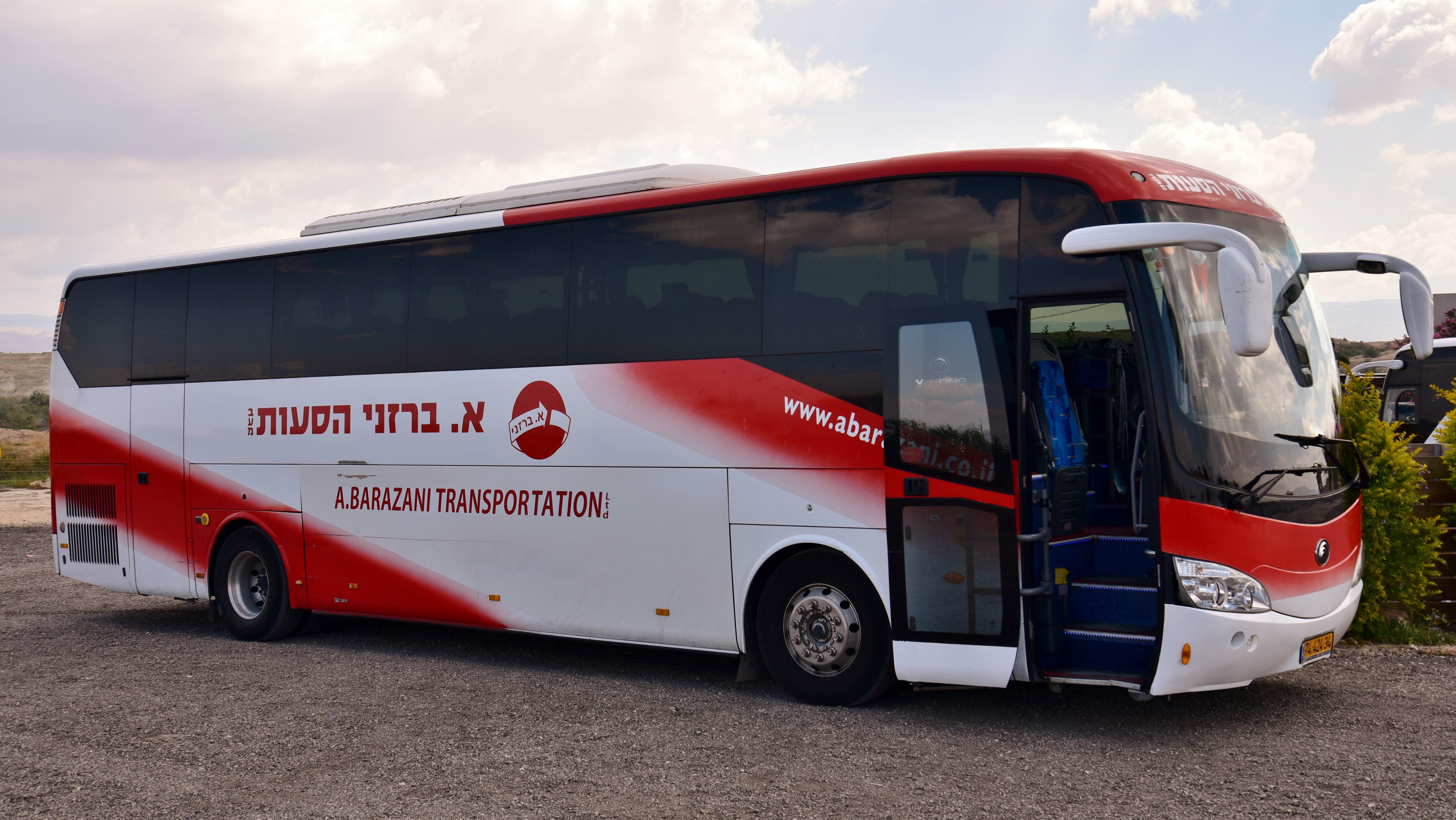
Yutong coach, Qasr al-Yahud, 2019

This article describes transport in Palestine, which consists of two non-contiguous territories, the West Bank and the Gaza Strip, different parts of which are administered by Palestinian National Authority, Hamas Administration in Gaza and Israel.

== Railways ==
There are no operating railways in the Palestinian territories.

The Camp David agreements, and repeated in statements made by Israel in 2005, there was a proposal to link the two Palestinian territories with a high speed rail line. This would involve extending the Heletz railway to Tarqumiyah (thus providing a rail link from Erez Crossing to the West Bank) and building a spur for the future Eastern Railway to Tulkarm, as well as rebuilding the old railway branch from a renewed Jezreel Valley Railway to Jenin. These links might be extended later through to Egypt and Jordan.

As of February 2012, a plan for a 475-kilometer rail network, establishing 11 new rail lines in West Bank, was confirmed by Israeli Transportation Ministry. The West Bank network would include one line running through Jenin, Nablus, Ramallah, Jerusalem, Ma'aleh Adumim, Bethlehem and Hebron. Another would provide service along the Jordanian border from Eilat to the Dead Sea, Jericho and Beit She'an and from there toward Haifa in the west and in also in a northeasterly direction. The proposed scheme also calls for shorter routes, such as between Nablus and Tulkarm in the West Bank, and from Ramallah to the Allenby Bridge crossing into Jordan.

=== History ===
Map showing the Gaza-beersheba railway line

The Gaza Strip had a standard-gauge railway running 34 kilometers along its length from north to south, which was built in 1916. Prior to 1948 and from about 1972 until an unknown date the line connected to what then became the Israeli system to the north. It also connected to the Egyptian railway system to the south from 1916 to 1967. The line has now been dismantled.

In the West Bank, a narrow-gauge railway operated until the 1940s from Jenin to Tulkarm and Nablus, which was built during Ottoman rule, and connected to the Hejaz Railway on a 1,050 mm (3 ft 5 11/32 in) gauge.

=== Links with adjacent countries ===
Several defunct railways in the Palestinian territories were previously used to link with adjacent countries:

- see Israel
  - A standard gauge rail link between Israel and Gaza through the Erez Crossing operated until the early 1970s. The railway has been dismantled in the Gaza Strip, and on the Israeli side Israel Railways' active railway line ends about 4.5 km northeast of the crossing, though in the future it may be re-extended to the crossing to provide a cargo service to the Gaza Strip.

- The narrow gauge Jezreel Valley Railway branch from Afula to Jenin operated until the 1940s. Also, until the late 1940s, a gauge break existed in Tulkarm between the Jenin—Tulkarm—Nablus narrow gauge railway and the standard gauge Eastern Railway. All these connections are now defunct.

- Egypt - defunct (Gaza)

== Roadways ==
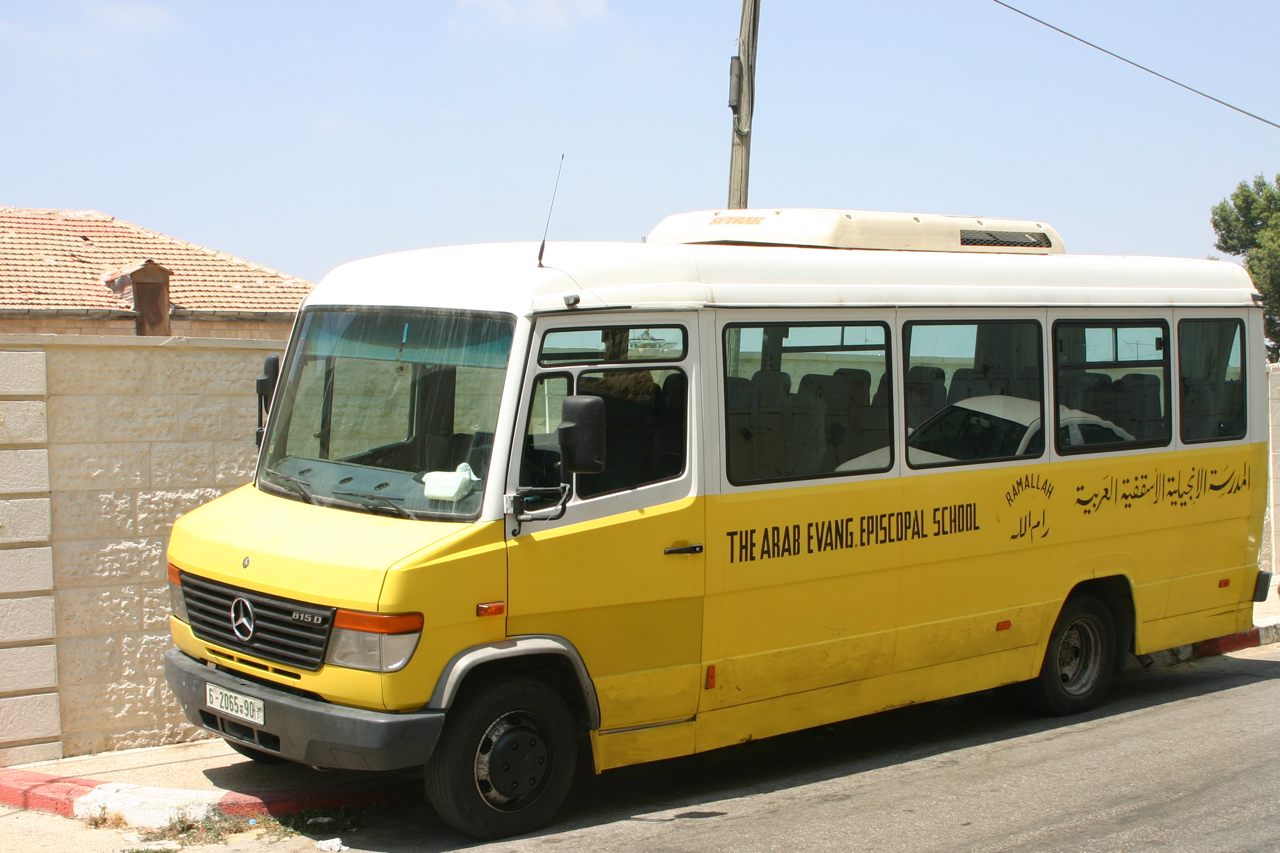
School bus in Ramallah

In 2010, the West Bank and Gaza Strip together had 4,686 km (2,912 mi) of roadways.

Salah al-Din Road, also known as the Salah ad-Deen Highway, is the main highway of the Gaza Strip. It is 45 kilometers long, and runs the entire length of the Gaza Strip from the Erez Crossing to Israel in the north to the Rafah Crossing to Egypt in the south.

== Ports and harbors ==
The West Bank is landlocked and has no ports.

The Port of Gaza is a small port near the Rimal district of Gaza City. It is the home port of Palestinian fishing-boats and the base of the Palestinian Naval Police, a branch of the Palestinian National Security Forces. Under the Oslo II Accord, the activities of the Palestinian Naval Police are restricted to 6 nautical miles from the coast. The Port of Gaza has been under naval blockade since 2007, and activities at the port have been restricted to small-scale fishing.

Construction of the Gaza Seaport had begun in the Gaza Strip, but the building was destroyed and the project abandoned after the outbreak of the Second Intifada in September 2000. There are no ships in the Gaza Strip over 1,000 gross tons.

== Airports ==
There are three defunct airports in the Palestinian territories. The Yasser Arafat International Airport (previously called Gaza International Airport), located in the Gaza Strip, was opened on 24 November 1998 as part of the Oslo II Accord and the 23 October 1998 Wye River Memorandum. The airport was closed in October 2000 by Israeli order after the breakout of the Second Intifada.

West Bank Palestinians traveling abroad can use the Allenby Bridge to enter Jordan and then use the Queen Alia International Airport in Amman, or the Eilat-Ramon Airport in Be'er Ora to fly abroad.

== Border crossings ==
The Allenby Bridge, also known as the Al-Karameh Bridge or King Hussein Bridge, is a bridge that crosses the Jordan River near the city of Jericho, and connects the West Bank with Jordan. The bridge is currently the sole designated exit/entry point for West Bank Palestinians traveling abroad. Since the 1994 Israel–Jordan peace treaty, the Allenby Bridge Terminal has been operated by the Israel Airports Authority.

The Erez Crossing is the only crossing on the Israel-Gaza Strip barrier between the Gaza Strip and Israel, and has been affected by the Israeli blockade of the Gaza Strip.

The Rafah Crossing is the only land crossing between the Gaza Strip and Egypt. There exists also the Kerem Shalom Crossing, managed by Israel, but used exclusively for the crossing of goods from Egypt into Gaza.

The Erez Crossing is the only land crossing for the movement of people between the Gaza Strip and Israel; it is also the only way in and out of Gaza at all when the Rafah Crossing is closed.

The Karni crossing was a cargo terminal on the Israel-Gaza Strip barrier located in the north-eastern end of the Gaza Strip. It was opened in 1994 after the signing of the Oslo Accords to allow Palestinian merchants to export and import goods. This was done as a 'back-to-back' transfer, meaning that Palestinian products meant for export were removed from a Palestinian truck and placed in an Israeli truck, or vice versa for incoming goods. Israel closed the Karni crossing after Hamas took over the Gaza Strip in June 2007, and the closure was made permanent at the end of March 2011.

The Kerem Shalom crossing was used by trucks carrying goods from Israel to the Gaza Strip.
