= List of birds of Palestine =

This is a list of the bird species recorded in Palestine. The avifauna of the Palestine region is unusually rich for so small an area. Henry B. Tristram, who identified much of the avifauna of Palestine in an 1885 study which denoted the geographical scope as covering an area of 5,600 square miles (15,000 km^{2}), identified 348 species. Of those, 271 are Palearctic, 40 are Ethiopian (10 of which are also Indian), 7 Indian and 30 which are peculiar to Syria.

Orders containing the largest numbers of species are: Passeriformes (songbirds) with 192 species, Charadriiformes (waders, plovers, gulls) with 88 species, Falconiformes (diurnal birds of prey) with 44 species and Anseriformes (swans, geese, ducks) with 33 species. The largest families are: Sylviidae (warblers) with 43 species, Turdidae (thrushes, chats) and Anatidae (swans, geese, ducks), both with 33 species and Accipitridae (eagles, vultures, hawks) with 32 species. The most populous genera are: Sylvia (warblers) with 15 species, Emberiza (buntings) with 14 and Larus (gulls) with 13, while Oenanthe (wheatears), Sterna (terns) and Falco (falcons) each comprise 11 species.

The types of avifauna are not equally diffused over the whole area. The Palearctic species are found largely near the coast of the Mediterranean Sea and the highlands east and west of Jordan. The Ethiopian and Indian types are almost exclusively confined to the Dead Sea basin. There are 30 species of migratory soaring birds that pass through Palestine annually.

== Ostriches ==
Order: Struthioniformes Family: Struthionidae

- Common ostrich, Struthio camelus extirpated
  - Arabian ostrich, Struthio camelus syriacus extinct

== Buzzards, eagles, harriers, hawks, kites and vultures ==
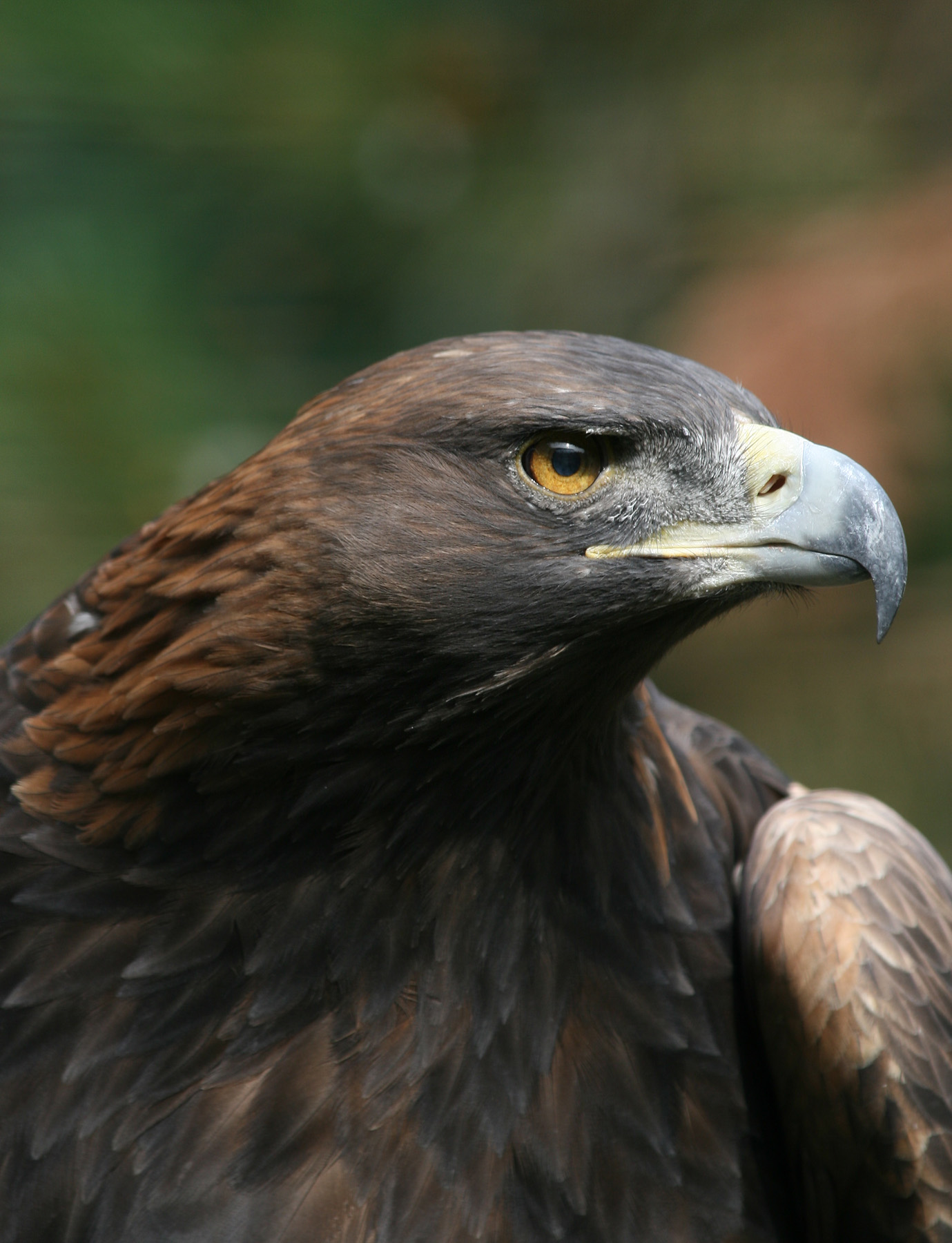
The golden eagle appears of the crest of the Palestinian National Authority and is a winter visitor to Palestine.

Order: Falconiformes Family: Accipitridae

- Egyptian vulture (Neophron percnopterus) (Arabic: الرخمة المصرية)
- Cinereous vulture/Eurasian black vulture (Aegypius monachus)
- Bearded vulture (Gypaetus barbatus) extirpated
- Eurasian griffon vulture (Gyps fulvus)
- Lappet-faced vulture (Torgos tracheliotos)
- Short-toed eagle (Circaetus gallicus)
- Western marsh harrier (Circus aeruginosus)
- Hen harrier (Circus cyaneus)
- Pallid harrier (Circus macrourus)
- Montagu's harrier (Circus pygargus)
- Eurasian sparrowhawk (Accipiter nisus) (Arabic: الباشق)
- Levant sparrowhawk (Tachyspiza brevipes)
- Eurasian goshawk (Astur gentilis)
- Common buzzard (Buteo buteo)
  - Steppe buzzard (Buteo buteo vulpinus)
- Long-legged buzzard (Buteo rufinus)
- European honey buzzard (Pernis apivorus) (Arabic: حوام النحل، عقاب الشنانير)
- Oriental honey buzzard/crested honey buzzard (Pernis ptilorhyncus) (Arabic: صقر العسل المقنزع, صقر العسل المقنزع بوحقب)
- Greater spotted eagle (Clanga clanga)
- Lesser spotted eagle (Clanga pomarina)
- Steppe eagle (Aquila nipalensis)
- Eastern imperial eagle (Aquila heliaca)
- Golden eagle (Aquila chrysaetos)
- Booted eagle (Hieraaetus pennatus)
- Bonelli's eagle (Aquila fasciata)
- Black kite (Milvus migrans)
- Red kite (Milvus milvus)

== Cranes ==
Order: Gruiformes Family: Gruidae

- Common crane (Grus grus)

== Rails, crakes, gallinules and coots ==
Order: Gruiformes Family: Rallidae

Rallidae is a large family of small to medium-sized birds which includes the rails, crakes, coots and gallinules. Typically they inhabit dense vegetation in damp environments near lakes, swamps or rivers. In general they are shy and secretive birds, making them difficult to observe. Most species have strong legs and long toes which are well adapted to soft uneven surfaces. They tend to have short, rounded wings and appear to be weak fliers. There are 143 species worldwide.

- Spotted crake (Porzana porzana)
- Little crake (Zapornia parva)
- Corn crake (Crex crex)
- Common moorhen (Gallinula chloropus)
- Eurasian coot (Fulica atra)

== Bustards ==
Order: Gruiformes Family: Otidae

- Little bustard (Tetrax tetrax)
- MacQueen's bustard, (Chlamydotis macqueenii)

== Cormorants ==
Order: Pelecaniformes Family: Phalacrocoracidae

- Great cormorant (Phalacrocorax carbo)
- Pygmy cormorant (Microcarbo pygmaeus)

== Pelicans ==
Order: Pelecaniformes Family: Pelecanidae

- Great white pelican (Pelecanus onocrotalus)
- Pink-backed pelican (Pelecanus rufescens)

== Falcons ==
Order: Falconiformes Family: Falconidae

- Lesser kestrel (Falco naumanni)
- Sooty falcon (Falco concolor)
- Eleonora's falcon (Falco eleonorae)
- Lanner falcon (Falco biarmicus)
- Peregrine falcon (Falco peregrinus)
  - * Barbary falcon (Falco peregrinus pelegrinoides)
- Red-footed falcon (Falco vespertinus)
- Saker falcon (Falco cherrug)
- Common kestrel (Falco tinnunculus)
- Eurasian hobby (Falco subbuteo)
- Merlin (Falco columbarius)

== Osprey ==
Order: Falconiformes Family: Pandionidae

- Osprey (Pandion haliaetus)

== Quails and partridges ==
Order: Galliformes Family: Phasianidae

The Phasianidae are a family of terrestrial birds which consists of quails, partridges, snowcocks, francolins, spurfowls, tragopans, monals, pheasants, peafowls and jungle fowls. In general, they are plump (although they vary in size) and have broad, relatively short wings. There are 156 species worldwide.

- Chukar (Alectoris chukar)
- Sand partridge (Ammoperdix heyi)
- Quail (Coturnix coturnix) (Arabic: الفر)

== Bittern, herons and egrets ==
Order: Ciconiiformes Family: Ardeidae

The family Ardeidae contains the bitterns, herons and egrets. Herons and egrets are medium to large wading birds with long necks and legs. Bitterns tend to be shorter necked and more wary. Unlike other long-necked birds such as storks, ibises and spoonbills, members of this family fly with their necks retracted.

- Eurasian bittern (Botaurus stellaris)
- Little bittern (Botaurus minutus)
- Black-crowned night heron (Nycticorax nycticorax)
- Squacco heron (Ardeola ralloides)
- Western cattle egret (Ardea ibis)
- Little egret (Egretta garzetta)
- Great egret (Ardea alba)
- Grey heron (Ardea cinerea)
- Purple heron (Ardea purpurea)

== Ibises and spoonbills ==
Order: Ciconiiformes Family: Threskiornithidae

Threskiornithidae is a family of large terrestrial and wading birds which comprises the ibises and spoonbills. Its members have long, broad wings with 11 primary and about 20 secondary flight feathers. They are strong fliers and, despite their size and weight, very capable soarers.

- Glossy ibis (Plegadis falcinellus)
- Eurasian spoonbill (Platalea leucorodia)

== Ducks, geese and swans ==
Order: Anseriformes Family: Anatidae

Anatidae includes the ducks and most duck-like waterfowl, such as geese and swans. These birds are adapted to an aquatic existence with webbed feet, flattened bills, and feathers that are excellent at shedding water due to an oily coating. There are 131 species worldwide.

- Whooper swan (Cygnus cygnus) (Arabic: البجع الصاخب) Occasional rare wander
- Bean goose (Anser fabalis) (Arabic: الإوز الأوروبي) Occasional rare wander
- Common shelduck (Tadorna tadorna)
- Ruddy shelduck (Tadorna ferruginea).
- Marbled teal (Marmaronetta angustirostris).
- Eurasian wigeon (Mareca penelope)
- Gadwall (Mareca strepera)
- Garganey (Spatula querquedula)
- Eurasian teal (Anas crecca)
- Mallard (Anas platyrhynchos)
- Northern pintail (Anas acuta)
- Northern shoveler (Spatula clypeata)
- Ferruginous duck (Aythya nyroca)
- Tufted duck (Aythya fuligula)
- Red-breasted merganser (Mergus serrator)
- White-headed duck (Oxyura leucocephala)

== Storks ==
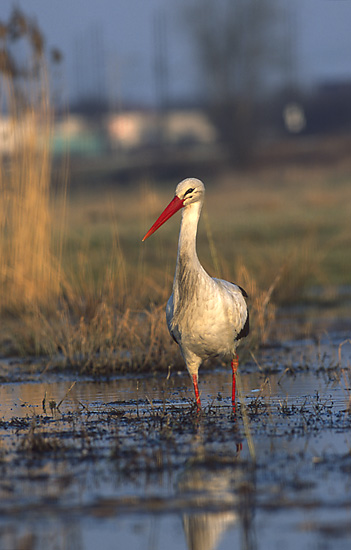
The white stork is very common in Palestine.

Order: Ciconiiformes Family: Ciconiidae

- White stork (Ciconia ciconia) (Arabic: اللقلق الابيض أو أبو سعد); very common
- Black stork (Ciconia nigra)

== Tropicbirds ==
Order: Pelecaniformes Family: Phaethontidae

- Red-billed tropicbird (Phaethon aethereus)

== Flamingoes ==
Order: Phoenicopteriformes Family: Phoenicopteridae

- Greater flamingo (Phoenicopterus roseus)

== Kingfishers ==
Order: Coraciiformes Family: Alcedinidae

Kingfishers are medium-sized birds with large heads, long pointed bills, short legs and stubby tails.

- Common kingfisher (Alcedo atthis)
- Smyrna kingfisher/white-breasted kingfisher (Halcyon smyrnesis)

== Bee-eaters ==
Order: Coraciiformes Family: Meropidae

The bee-eaters are a group of near passerine birds in the family Meropidae. Most species are found in Africa but others occur in southern Europe, southern Asia, Australia and New Guinea. They are characterised by richly coloured plumage, slender bodies and usually elongated central tail feathers. All are colourful and have long down-turned bills and pointed wings, which give them a swallow-like appearance when seen from afar. There are 26 species worldwide.

- Arabian green bee-eater (Merops cyanophrys)
- Blue-cheeked bee-eater (Merops persicus)
- European bee-eater (Merops apiaster)

== Typical rollers ==
Order: Coraciiformes Family: Coraciidae

Rollers resemble crows in size and build, but are more closely related to the kingfishers and bee-eaters. They share the colourful appearance of those groups with blues and browns predominating. The two inner front toes are connected, but the outer toe is not. There are 12 species worldwide.

- European roller (Coracias garrulus) (Arabic: أبو زريق)

== Hoopoe ==
Order: Coraciiformes Family: Upupidae

Hoopoes have black, white and pink plumage and a large erectile crest on the head. There are two species worldwide.

- Hoopoe (Upupa epops)

== Woodpeckers ==
Order: Piciformes Family: Picidae

- Syrian woodpecker (Dendrocopos syriacus); common resident.<ref=Safadi2>Al- Safadi, M.M. (2004). On the breeding biology of the Syrian woodpecker, Dendrocopos syriacus syriacus in the Gaza Strip. Zoology in the Middle East. 32: 5-10.</ref>
- Eurasian wryneck (Jynx torquilla)

== Thrushes ==
Order: Passeriformes Family: Turdidae

- Common blackbird (Turdus merula); common winter visitor (WV) and locally common resident
- Fieldfare (Turdus pilaris); occasional WV
- Mistle thrush (Turdus viscivorus); occasional WV
- Redwing (Turdus iliacus)
- Song thrush (Turdus philomelos); very common WV

== Old World flycatchers ==
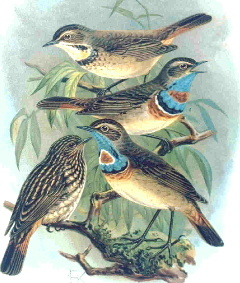
The bluethroat of the red-spotted race is a fairly common winter visitor to Palestine.

Order: Passeriformes Family: Muscicapidae

- Arabian wheatear (Oenanthe fins chi); common WV and resident in the south
- Eastern black-eared wheatear (Oenanthe melanoleuca); very common
- Northern wheatear (Oenanthe oenanthe); common migrant
- Desert wheatear (Oenanthe deserti); uncommon resident
- Eastern pied wheatear (Oenanthe pleschanka); once recorded from Rafah
- Hooded wheatear (Oenanthe monacha); rare resident
- Isabelline wheatear (Oenanthe isabellina); common migrant and locally common resident
- Tristram's wheatear (Oenanthe moesta); rare resident
- Mourning wheatear/pied wheatear (Oenanthe lugens); locally common resident
- White rumped wheatear (Oenanthe leucopyga); uncommon resident near Dead Sea
- African stonechat (Saxicola torquata); common WV
- Whinchat (Saxicola rubetra); uncommon migrant
- Black redstart (Phoenicurus ochruros); common WV
- Common redstart (Phoenicurus phoenicurus); common migrant
- Bluethroat (Luscinia svecica); fairly common WV
  - Red-spotted bluethroat (Luscinia svecica svecica); fairly common WV
  - White-spotted bluethroat (Luscinia svecica volgae); WV less common
- Nightingale (Luscinia megarhynchos); migrant (Tristram states that it breeds in Palestine)
- Thrush nightingale/sprosser (Luscinia luscinia); migrant (Arabic: العندليب, العندليب الأرقط)
- European robin (Erithacus rubecula); common WV
- Blue thrush (Monticola solitarius); common WV and locally common resident
- Rock thrush (Monticola saxatilis); uncommon migrant, common in some years
- Spotted flycatcher (Muscicapa striata)
- Collared flycatcher (Ficedula albicollis)
- European pied flycatcher (Ficedula hypoleuca)
- Red-breasted flycatcher (Ficedula parva)
- Semi-collared flycatcher (Ficedula semitorquata)

== Sylviid warblers, parrotbills, and allies ==
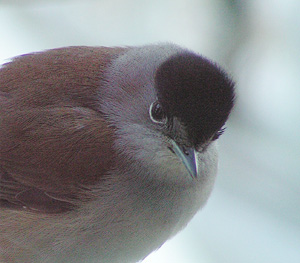
An adult male blackcap. These are common winter visitors to Palestine and a few remain resident to breed.

Order: Passeriformes Family: Sylviidae

- Barred warbler (Curruca nisoria); rare migrant
- Blackcap (Sylvia atricapilla); common WV, a few remain to breed
- Asian desert warbler (Curruca nana); only recorded from south end of Dead Sea
- Garden warbler (Sylvia borin); common migrant that Tristram states breeds in Palestine
- Lesser whitethroat (Sylvia curruca); common migrant that perhaps breeds in Palestine
- Menetries's warbler (Curruca mystacea)
- Eastern Orphean warbler (Curruca crassirostris); common migrant and summer visitor (SV)
- Cyprus warbler (Curruca melanothorax); one pair obtained by Tristram near the Dead Sea
- Red Sea warbler/Arabian warbler (Curruca leucomelaena)
- Rüppell's warbler (Curruca ruppeli); uncommon migrant
- Sardinian warbler (Curruca melanocephala); fairly common resident
  - Bowman's warbler (Curruca melanocephala momus) subspecies of Sardinian warbler; common resident
- Spectacled warbler (Curruca conspicillata); fairly common resident
- Eastern subalpine warbler (Curruca cantillans); uncommon migrant and SV
- Common whitethroat (Curruca communis); common migrant and SV (summer visitor)

== Grassbirds and allies ==
Order: Passeriformes Family: Locustellidae

- River warbler (Locustella fluviatilis)
- Savi's warbler (Locustella luscinioides)

== Reed warblers and allies ==
Order: Passeriformes Family: Acrocephalidae

- Icterine warbler (Hippolais icterina)
- Olive-tree warbler (Hippolais olivetorum); common migrant and a few remain to breed
- Upcher's warbler (Hippolais languida); common SV in the hills
- Eastern olivaceous warbler (Iduna pallida); common SV in the plains and Jordan valley
- Clamorous reed warbler (Acrocephalus stentoreus); common SV in Hula marshes
- Common reed warbler (Acrocephalus scirpaceus); common migrant
- Great reed warbler (Acrocephalus arundinacea); common SV
- Marsh warbler (Acrocephalus palustris); migrant
- Moustached warbler (Acrocephalus melanopogon)
- Sedge warbler (Acrocephalus schoenobaenus)

== Bush warblers and allies ==
Order: Passeriformes Family: Cettiidae

- Cetti's warbler (Cettia cetti)

== Leaf warblers ==
Order: Passeriformes Family: Phylloscopidae

- Yellow-browed warbler (Phylloscopus superciliosus); one obtained by Tristram at Jericho in 1864
- Common chiffchaff (Phylloscopus collybita); common WV
- Willow warbler (Phylloscopus irochilus); common migrant
- Wood warbler (Phylloscopus sibilatrix); common migrant in the plains
- Eastern Bonelli's warbler (Phylloscopus orientalis); common migrant and uncommon SV

== Cisticolas and allies ==
Order: Passeriformes Family: Cisticolidae

- Zitting cisticola (Cisticola juncidis); locally common resident
- Graceful prinia (Prinia gracilis); common resident

== Streaked scrub warbler ==
Order: Passeriformes Family: Scotocercidae

- Streaked scrub warbler (Scotocerca inquieta); uncommon resident

== Crows and allies ==
Order: Passeriformes Family: Corvidae

The family Corvidae includes crows, ravens, jays, choughs, magpies, treepies, nutcrackers and ground jays. Corvids are above average in size among the Passeriformes, and some of the larger species show high levels of intelligence.

- Brown-necked raven (Corvus ruficollis)
- Common raven (Corvus corax)
- Fan-tailed raven (Corvus rhipidurus)
- Hooded crow (Corvus cornix)
- House crow (Corvus splendens)
- Western jackdaw (Coloeus monedula)

== Starlings ==
Order: Passeriformes Family: Sturnidae

Starlings are small to medium-sized passerine birds. Their flight is strong and direct and they are very gregarious. Their preferred habitat is fairly open country. They eat insects and fruit. Plumage is typically dark with a metallic sheen.

- European starling (Sturnus vulgaris)
- Rosy starling (Pastor roseus)
- Tristram's starling/Tristram's grackle (Onychognathus tristramii)

== Larks ==
Order: Passeriformes Family: Alaudidae

Larks are small terrestrial birds with often extravagant songs and display flights. Most larks are fairly dull in appearance. Their food is insects and seeds.

- Thick-billed lark (Ramphocoris clotbey)
- Bimaculated lark (Melanocorypha bimaculata)
- Calandra lark (Melanocorypha calandra)
- Mediterranean short-toed lark (Alaudala rufescens)
- Greater short-toed lark (Calandrella brachydactyla)
- Crested lark (Galerida cristata)
- Woodlark (Lullula arborea)
- Eurasian skylark (Alauda arvensis)
- Oriental skylark (Alauda gulgula)
- Temminck's horned lark (Eremophila bilopha)
- Desert lark (Ammomanes deserti)

== Swallows and martins ==
Order: Passeriformes Family: Hirundinidae

The family Hirundinidae is adapted to aerial feeding. They have a slender streamlined body, long pointed wings and a short bill with a wide gape. The feet are adapted to perching rather than walking, and the front toes are partially joined at the base. There are 75 species worldwide.

- Common house martin (Delichon urbicum)
- Sand martin (Riparia riparia)
- Eurasian crag martin (Ptyonoprogne rupestris)
- Pale crag martin (Ptyonoprogne obsoleta)
- Barn swallow (Hirundo rustica) and the sub-species Egyptian barn swallow (Hirundo rustica savignii)
- European red-rumped swallow (Cecropis rufula)

== Shrikes ==
Order: Passeriformes Family: Laniidae

Shrikes are passerine birds known for the habit of some species of catching other birds and small animals and impaling the uneaten portions of their bodies on thorns. A typical shrike's beak is hooked, like a bird of prey.

- Isabelline shrike (Lanius isabellinus)
- Great grey shrike (Lanius excubitor)
- Lesser grey shrike (Lanius minor)
- Masked shrike (Lanius nubicus)
- Red-backed shrike (Lanius collurio)
- Woodchat shrike (Lanius senator)

== Finches ==
Order: Passeriformes Family: Fringillidae

Finches are passerine birds known for their stout conical bills adapted for eating seeds and which often have colourful plumage. Some finches, particularly, the goldfinch, are known for their pleasant to cacophonous song, which changes in pitch and in tone, from trills into twitters.

- European goldfinch (Carduelis carduelis)

== Bulbuls ==
Order: Passeriformes Family: Pycnonotidae

Bulbuls are renowned for their melodious tunes, hence its name in Arabic: (بلبل), meaning nightingale.

- White-spectacled bulbul (Pycnonotus xanthopygos)

== Avocets and stilts ==
Order: Charadriiformes Family: Recurvirostridae

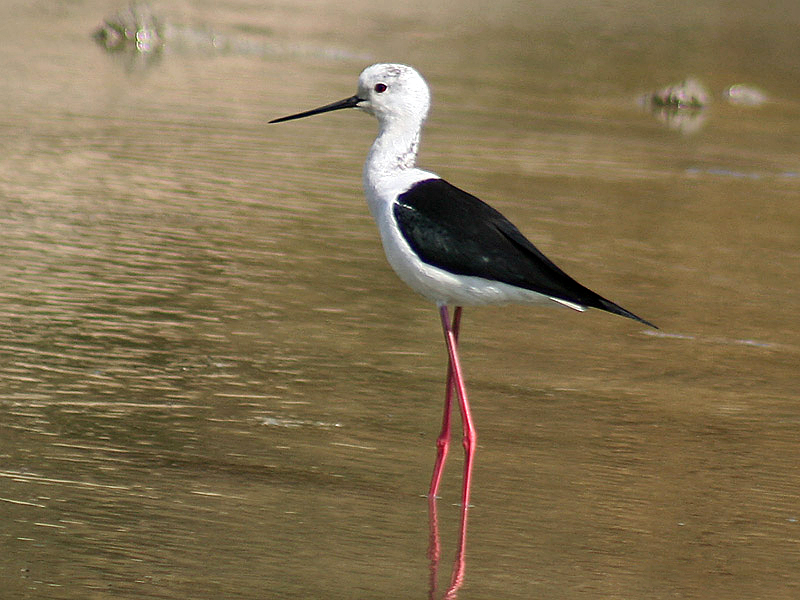
The black-winged stilt

Recurvirostridae is a family of large wading birds, which includes the avocets and stilts. The avocets have long legs and long up-curved bills. The stilts have extremely long legs and long, thin, straight bills. There are nine species worldwide

- Pied avocet (Recurvrostra avosetta)
- Black-winged stilt (Himantopus himantopus)

== Thick-knees ==
Order: Charadriiformes Family: Burhinidae

The thick-knees are a group of largely tropical waders in the family Burhinidae. They are found worldwide within the tropical zone, with some species also breeding in temperate Europe and Australia. They are medium to large waders with strong black or yellow-black bills, large yellow eyes and cryptic plumage. Despite being classed as waders, most species have a preference for arid or semi-arid habitats. There are nine species worldwide.

- Eurasian stone-curlew (Burhinus oedicnemus)

== Oystercatchers ==
Order: Charadriiformes Family: Haematopodidae

- Eurasian oystercatcher (Haematopus ostralegus)

== Plovers and lapwings ==
Order: Charadriiformes Family: Charadriidae

- Little ringed plover (Charadrius dubius)
- Ringed plover (Charadrius hiaticula)
- Kentish plover (Anarhynchus alexandrinus)
- Caspian plover (Anarhynchus asiaticus)
- Spur-winged plover (Vanellus spinosus)
- White-tailed plover (Vanellus leucurus)
- Northern lapwing (Vanellus vanellus)
- Sociable lapwing (Vanellus gregarius)
- Pacific golden plover (Pluvialis fulva)
- Eurasian golden plover (Pluvialis apricaria)
- Grey plover (Pluvialis squatarola)

== Pratincoles and coursers ==
Order: Charadriiformes Family: Glareolidae

Glareolidae is a family of wading birds comprising the pratincoles, which have short legs, long pointed wings and long forked tails, and the coursers, which have long legs, short wings and long pointed bills which curve downwards.

- Cream-coloured courser (Cursorius cursor)
- Collared pratincole (Glareola pratincola)
- Black-winged pratincole (Glareola nordmanni)

== Gulls ==
Order: Charadriiformes Family: Laridae

Laridae is a family of medium to large seabirds, the gulls, terns and kittiwakes. They are typically grey or white, often with black markings on the head or wings. They have stout, longish bills and webbed feet. A distinct subfamily, terns are a group of generally medium to large seabirds typically with grey or white plumage, often with black markings on the head. Most terns hunt fish by diving but some pick insects off the surface of fresh water. Terns are generally long-lived birds, with several species known to live in excess of 30 years.

- Black-headed gull (Chroicocephalus ridibundus) (Arabic: النورس اسود الرأس)
- Great black-headed gull (Ichthyaetus ichthyaetus)
- Lesser black-backed gull (Larus fuscus)
- White-eyed gull (Ichthyaetus leucophthalmus)
- Armenian gull (Larus armenicus)

== Skuas ==
Order: Charadriiformes Family: Stercorariidae

The family Stercorariidae are, in general, medium to large birds, typically with grey or brown plumage, often with white markings on the wings. They nest on the ground in temperate and arctic regions and are long-distance migrants. There are seven species worldwide.

- Pomarine skua (Stercorarius pomarinus)
- Gull-billed tern (Gelochelidon nilotica)
- Common tern (Sterna hirundo)
- Little tern (Sternula albifrons)
- Whiskered tern (Chlidonias hybrida)
- White-winged tern/white–winged black tern (Chlidonias leucopterus)

== Sandpipers and allies ==
Order: Charadriiformes Family: Scolopacidae

Scolopacidae is a large diverse family of small to medium-sized shorebirds including the sandpipers, curlews, godwits, shanks, tattlers, woodcocks, snipes, dowitchers and phalaropes. The majority of these species eat small invertebrates picked out of the mud or soil. Variation in length of legs and bills enables multiple species to feed in the same habitat, particularly on the coast, without direct competition for food.

- Little stint (Calidris minuta)
- Temminck's stint (Calidris temminckii)
- Curlew sandpiper (Calidris ferruginea)
- Dunlin (Calidris alpina)
- Ruff (Calidris pugnax)
- Sanderling (Calidris alba)
- Jack snipe (Lymnocryptes minimus)
- Eurasian woodcock (Scolopax rusticola), vagrant recorded in the Gaza Strip
- Common snipe (Gallinago gallinago)
- Eurasian curlew (Numenius arquata)
- Eurasian whimbrel (Numenius phaeopus)
- Spotted redshank (Tringa erythropus)
- Common redshank (Tringa totanus)
- Greenshank (Tringa nebularia)
- Green sandpiper (Tringa ochropus)
- Wood sandpiper (Tringa glareola)
- Common sandpiper (Actitis hypoleucos)
- Black-tailed godwit (Limosa limosa)
- Bar-tailed godwit (Limosa lapponica)
- Terek sandpiper (Xenus cinereus)
- Turnstone (Arenaria interpres)

== Pigeons and doves ==
Order: Columbiformes Family: Columbidae

Pigeons and doves are stout-bodied birds with short necks and short slender bills with a fleshy cere.

- Rock dove (Columba livia) and subspecies Columba livia schimperi
- Stock dove (Columba oenas)
- Common wood pigeon (Columba palumbus)
- Eurasian collared dove (Streptopelia decaocto)
- European turtle dove (Streptopelia turtur) (Arabic: اليمام القمري)
- Oriental turtle dove (Streptopelia orientalis)
- African collared dove (Streptopelia roseogrisea)
- Barbary dove (Streptopelia risoria)
- Laughing dove (Spilopelia senegalensis)
- Namaqua dove (Oena capensis)

== Cuckoos ==
Order: Cuculiformes Family: Cuculidae

The family Cuculidae includes cuckoos, roadrunners and anis. These birds are of variable size with slender bodies, long tails and strong legs. Many Old World cuckoo species are brood parasites.

- Great spotted cuckoo (Clamator glandarius)
- Common cuckoo (Cuculus canorus)

== Sandgrouse ==
Order: Pterocliformes Family: Pteroclidae

- Crowned sandgrouse (Pterocles coronatus)
- Black-bellied sandgrouse (Pterocles orientalis)

== Barn owls ==
Order: Strigiformes Family: Tytonidae

Barn-owls are medium to large owls with large heads and characteristic heart-shaped faces. They have long strong legs with powerful talons. There are 16 species worldwide.

- Western barn owl (Tyto alba)

== Typical owls ==
Order: Strigiformes Family: Strigidae

The typical owls are small to large solitary nocturnal birds of prey. They have large forward-facing eyes and ears, a hawk-like beak and a conspicuous circle of feathers around each eye called a facial disk. There are 195 species worldwide.

- Brown fish-owl (Ketupa zeylonensis)
- Eurasian eagle owl (Bubo bubo)
- Pharaoh eagle-owl (Bubo ascalaphus); resident in the southern desert.
- Striated scops owl (Otus brucei)
- Eurasian scops owl (Otus scops)
- Little owl (Athene noctua)
- Long-eared owl (Asio otus)
- Short-eared owl (Asio flammeus)

== Nightjars ==
Order: Caprimulgiformes Family: Caprimulgidae

Nightjars are medium-sized ground-nesting nocturnal birds with long wings, short legs and very short bills. Most have small feet, of little use for walking, and long pointed wings. Their soft plumage is camouflaged to resemble bark or leaves. There are 86 species worldwide.

- European nightjar (Caprimulgus europaeus) common migrant.
- Nubian nightjar (Caprimulgus nubicus)
- Red-necked nightjar (Caprimulgus ruficollis); once recorded from Jerusalem.

== Swifts ==
Order: Caprimulgiformes Family: Apodidae

Swifts are small birds which spend the majority of their lives flying. These birds have very short legs and never settle voluntarily on the ground, perching instead only on vertical surfaces. Many swifts have long swept-back wings which resemble a crescent or boomerang. There are 98 species worldwide.

- Alpine swift (Tachymarptis melba)
- Common swift (Apus apus) (Arabic: السمامة)
- Little swift (Apus affinis)
- Pallid swift (Apus pallidus)

== Accentors and dunnocks ==
Order: Caprimulgiformes Family: Prunellidae

- Dunnock (Prunella modularis); fairly common WV
- Palestine sunbird (Cinnyris osea) (Arabic: تمير فلسطيني)

== Wagtails and pipits ==
- Grey wagtail (Motacilla cinerea)
- Western yellow wagtail (Motacilla flava)
- White wagtail (Motacilla alba)
- Tawny pipit (Anthus campestris)
- Meadow pipit (Anthus pratensis)
- Tree pipit (Anthus trivialis)
- Red-throated pipit (Anthus cervinus)
- Water pipit (Anthus spinoletta)

== Bibliography ==
- Hastings, James (2004). A Dictionary of the Bible: Volume II: (Part II: I -- Kinsman) (Illustrated ed.). The Minerva Group, Inc. ISBN 978-1-4102-1725-7.
