= Geology of the Palestinian territories =

The geology of Palestinian territories includes deep Arabian Shield metamorphic rocks, overlain by sandstone, dolomite, limestone, gypsum and clays from the Paleozoic, Mesozoic and Cenozoic.

Research published in 2012 confirmed the existence of Pleistocene loess in Wadi Gaza (The Besor), which has a large watershed covering the Northern Negev Desert, the Hebron Mountains and the Gaza Strip—where it discharges into the Mediterranean Sea. The study identified three Kurkar ridges in the Gaza Strip running northeast–southwest: Skeikh Ejilin Ridge, Al Montar Ridge and Bait Hanon Ridge. During the winter, the wadi feeds up to 20 million cubic meters of rainwater into the area.
