= Melbourne Palestine Solidarity Network =

Network of activists in Melbourne, Australia

The Melbourne Palestine Solidarity Network (MPSN) is a grouping of individuals, community groups and activists based in Melbourne, Australia. They oppose what they see as Israeli aggression towards not just Palestinians but neighboring countries such as Lebanon. MPSN is known for organising demonstrations and campaigns against Israel and its supporters.
