= Ministry of Industry (Palestine) =

Agency overview
- Formed: 17 May 1996
- Jurisdiction: Government of Palestine
- Headquarters: Ramallah, Palestine
- Minister responsible: Arafat Asfour, Minister of Industry
- Website: mind.gov.ps

The Ministry of Industry is a ministry in Palestine. It was established in 1996 to deal with the industrial sector in the State of Palestine. Its current minister is Arafat Asfour.

== History ==
The Palestinian Ministry of Industry was first established in May 1996 as part of the formation of the second Palestinian government (Yasser Arafat's second government).

Since the fourth Palestinian government (Yasser Arafat's fourth government) in 2002, the Ministry of Industry has been merged with the Palestinian Ministry of Economy, where the Ministry of Economy has become concerned with economic, trade and industry affairs, and the ministry became the Ministry of Economy, Trade and Industry during the period from October 2002 to March 2003.

In March 2024, the ministry was reactivated within the nineteenth Palestinian government (the government of Mohammed Mustafa).

== List of ministers ==
#	Name	Party	Government	Term start	Term end	Notes
Minister of Industry
1	Bashir Barghouti	Palestinian People's Party	2	17 May 1996	9 August 1998	
2	Saadi al-Karnaz	Fatah	3	9 August 1998	13 June 2002	
Minister of Economy and Industry
—	Maher al-Masri	Fatah	4	13 June 2002	29 October 2002	
Minister of Economy, Trade and Industry
—	Maher al-Masri	Fatah	5	29 October 2002	30 April 2003	
Minister of Industry
	Vacant		6, 7, 8, 9, 10, 11, 12, 13, 14, 15, 16, 17, 18	30 April 2003	31 March 2024	
3	Arafat Asfour	Independent	19	31 March 2024	Incumbent	

== See also ==
- Economy of Palestine
