= Olive oil soap =

Olive oil soap may refer to the following olive oil-based soaps:

- Aleppo soap
- Castile soap
- Marseille soap
- Nabulsi soap
