= Vegan soap =

Soaps made from vegetable fats or oils

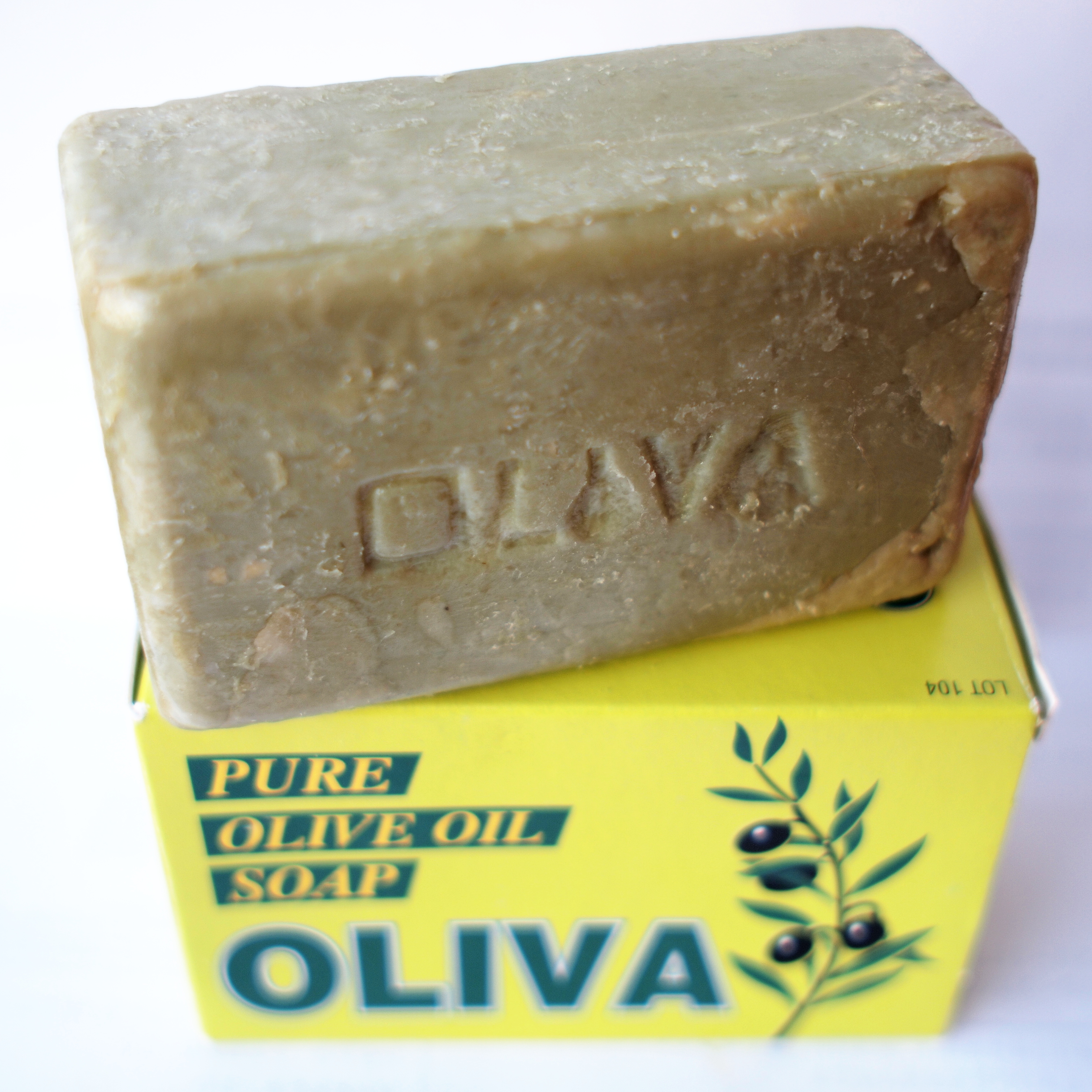
Olive oil soap is a common vegetable based soap.

Vegan soaps (or vegetable soaps) are soaps made from fats or oils of vegetable origin rather than from saponified animal fats. The Vegan Society's definition of veganism encourages consumers to avoid all products containing ingredients derived from animals, so vegan soaps might include aloe vera, castor oil, cornstarch, corn syrup, pectin, or essential oils, while excluding animal products such as lanolin, gelatin, lard, and tallow. Examples of traditional vegan soaps include: Aleppo soap, Castile soap, Marseille soap, Nabulsi soap, African black soap, and some glycerin soaps.

Vegans may boycott soaps tested on animals. The Vegan Society defines veganism as excluding "—as far as is possible and practicable—all forms of exploitation of, and cruelty to, animals". According to People for the Ethical Treatment of Animals (PETA), there are "plenty" of animal-testing free vegan bar soaps to choose from, "no matter your skin type or budget."

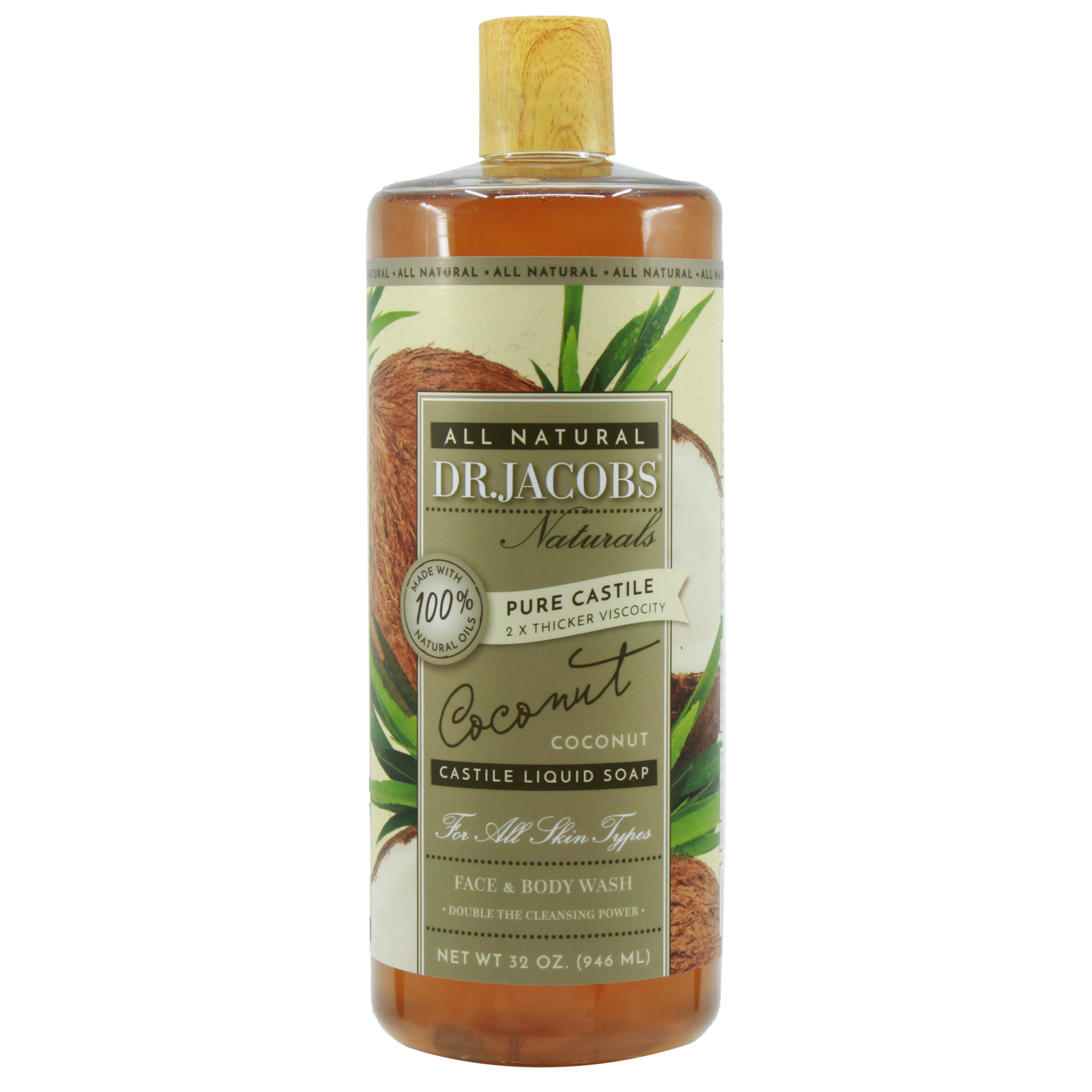
Vegan Certified Soap

== See also ==
- Shower gel, often synthetic liquid soaps or detergents
- Soap substitute
