= Nabulsi soap =

Olive oil-based hard soap

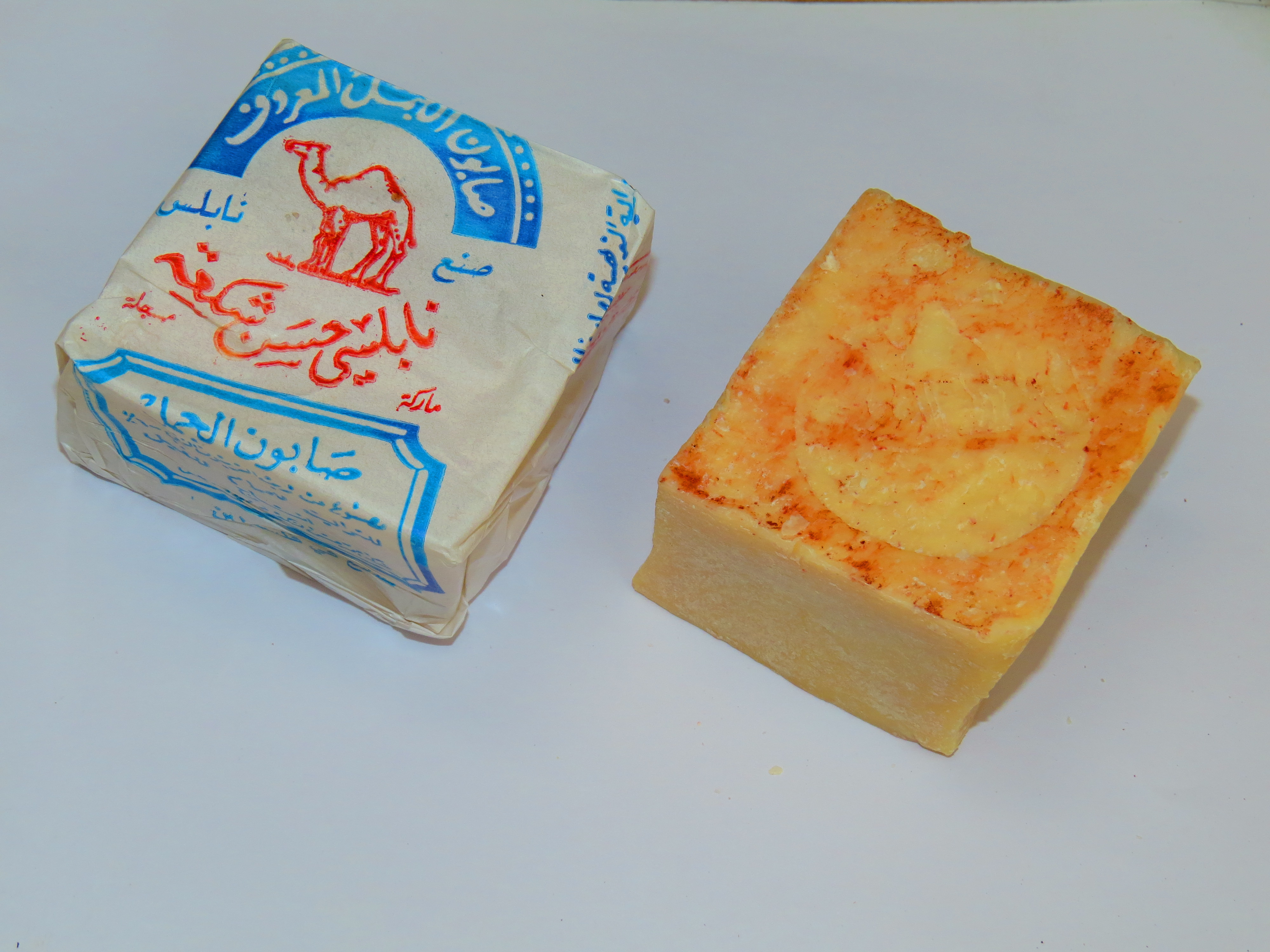
Al-Jamal (camel) brand of Nabulsi soap with and without its paper packaging, 2014

Nabulsi soap (Arabic: صابون نابلسي, romanized: ṣābūn Nābulsī) is an olive oil–based hard soap from the Palestinian city of Nablus. Its chief ingredients are virgin olive oil, water, and an alkaline sodium compound, such as sodium hydroxide. The finished product is coloured ivory, and has almost no scent. Traditionally made by women for household use, it had become a significant industry for Nablus by the 14th century. In 1907, the city's 30 soap factories were supplying half of all soap in Palestine. The industry had begun declining by the mid-20th century due to the destruction inflicted on the Old City of Nablus by the 1927 Jericho earthquake and later due to the 1967 Arab–Israeli War and consequential Israeli occupation of the West Bank. As of December 2022, there are at least five soap factories operating in the city of Nablus.

== History ==
Nabulsi soap was traditionally made by women for household use, even before the appearance of small soap-making factories in the 10th century. Trade with Bedouins was indispensable for soap-making, both in Nablus and Hebron, since they alone could furnish the alkaline soda (qilw) required by the process. By the 14th century a significant soap-making industry had developed in Nablus and the soap, reputedly prized by Queen Elizabeth I of England, was exported throughout the Middle East and Europe.

During the 16th-century, olive-oil soap produced in Jerusalem was sold in Nablus, despite Nablus producing its own soap, and per historian Amnon Cohen, Nabulsi soap did not compete with Jerusalem soap "in any way" until the late Ottoman period "when Nablus soap became the best in Palestine", Cohen also commented that Jerusalem was the primary producer of soap in Palestine at the time, and possibly even Greater Syria.

=== Rise ===
The 19th century saw a major expansion of soap manufacturing in Nablus, which became the center of soap production throughout the Fertile Crescent. By 1907, the city's 30 factories were producing nearly 5,000 tons of Nabulsi soap annually, over half of all soap production in Palestine. John Bowring wrote of Nabulsi soap in the 1830s that it was "highly esteemed in the Levant", and Muhammad Kurd Ali, a Syrian historian, wrote in the 1930s that "Nablus soap is the best and most famous soap today for it has, it seems, a quality not found in others and the secret is that it is unadulterated and well produced."

During the Mandate for Palestine, soap brands competing with Nabulsi existed in Palestine; like the Jaffa-Ramla soap industry, which produced cheaper soap of linseed oil or coconut oil, according to historian Deborah Bernstein, the Jaffa-Ramle industry declined while the Nablus soap industry maintained its market. Another competitor was soap produced by Shemen Industries Ltd.; a Jewish company in Haifa. According to Bernstein, Shemen soap was cheaper than Nabulsi soap and did not "substitute it", but there were indications of competition between Nabulsi soap and Shemen soap as Shemen marketed its soap as being "as refined as the Nablus soap", and was even dyed red to appear similar to Arab-produced soaps.

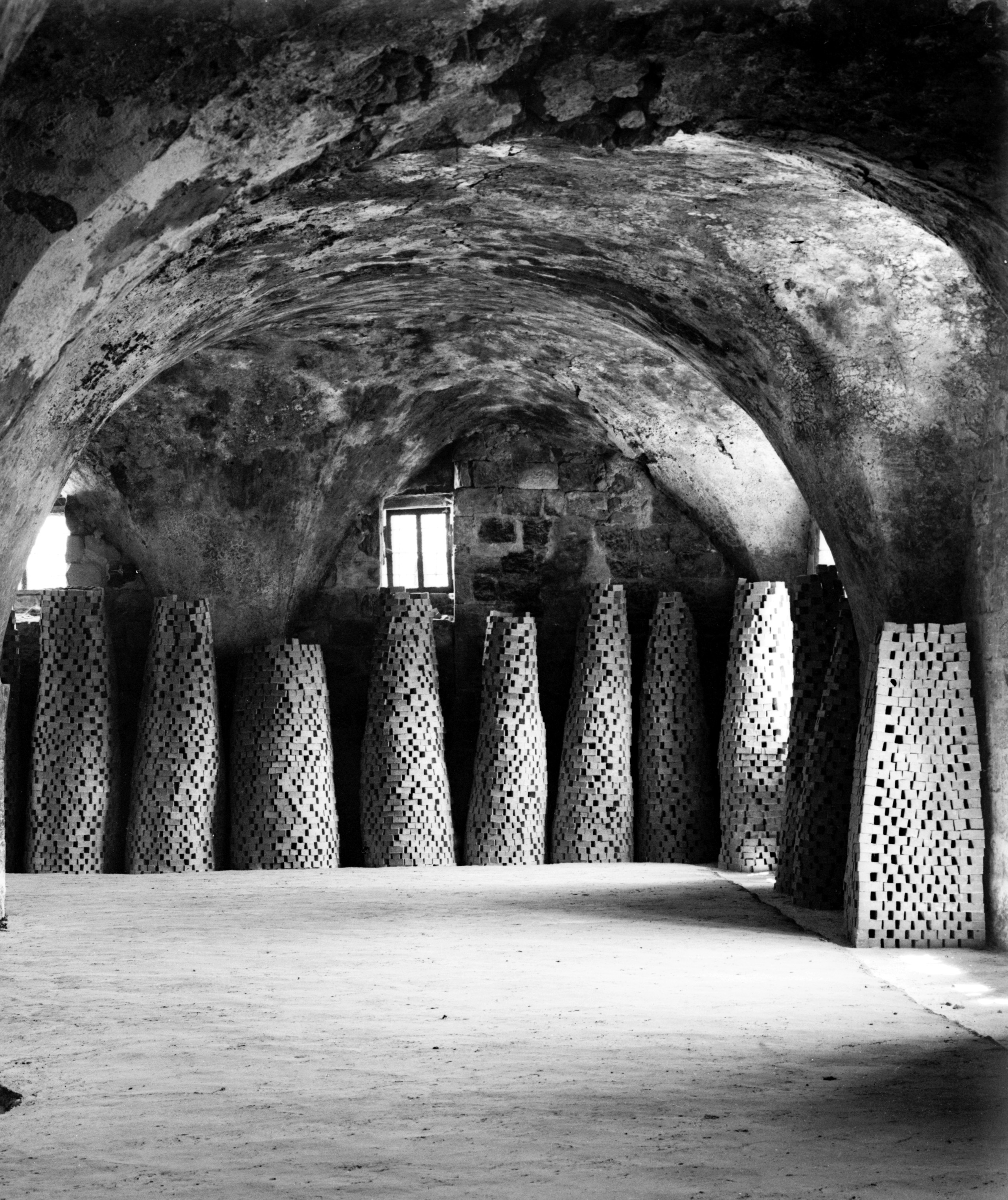
Nabulsi soap stacked for drying, photographed between 1900 and 1920 by a member of the American Colony of Jerusalem

=== Decline ===
The soap industry in Nablus began to decline in the mid-20th century, caused in part by natural disasters, especially the 1927 Jericho earthquake, which destroyed much of the Old City of Nablus, and in part by Israeli military occupation. Israeli military raids during the Second Intifada destroyed several soap factories in the historic quarter of Nablus. Only two factories remain in production in the Old City of Nablus as of 2008; currently, products are sold primarily in Palestine and the Arab countries, with some fair-trade exports to Europe and beyond. On the continuing problems both in terms of the soap's manufacture and its export, the General Manager of the factory owned by the Touqan family commented in 2008:

Before 2000, our factory used to produce 600 tons of soap annually. Due to the physical and economic obstacles we face now because of the Israeli occupation – and especially the checkpoints – we produce barely half that amount today.

According to the United Nations Office for the Coordination of Humanitarian Affairs, the checkpoints and roadblocks set up throughout the West Bank have created problems in the transportation of supplies and material to and from the factories as well as making it difficult for workers to get from their homes to the factories. Nabulsi soap is still widely sold in Nablus and the West Bank. It is also exported to Jordan, Kuwait, and Arab-Israeli cities such as Nazareth.

Nabulsi soap remained one of Nablus' leading export products in the mid-2000s; in 2007, the director of the Nablus Chamber of Commerce and Industry told Al Jazeera Arabic that soap accounted for 41.5% of the city's exports in 2005, declining to 36.2% in 2006. The director attributed the decrease to damage sustained by soap factories during Israeli military operations and to economic restrictions affecting the Palestinian territories. Chamber records also indicated a decline in the number of operating soap factories, from around 30 in late 2004 to approximately 20 in 2005, with annual production ranging between 500 and 1,000 tons. Although 25 soap factories were officially registered by the end of 2005, many had reportedly ceased production or substantially reduced output.

=== 2020s ===
A 2020 Business Insider article reported that the Nablus Soap Company, one of the surviving factories, produced 200–500 kilograms of soap daily, compared to 3 tons daily 30 years prior. The company told the Wall Street Journal that the situation was worsened by Israeli checkpoints during the Gaza war, which limited freedom of movement.

As of December 2022, there are at least five al-Masaben (soap factories) in the city of Nablus, and among which, there are only two soap factories operating in the Old City of Nablus by 2008.

In December 2024, "Tradition of Nabulsi soap making in Palestine" was recognized by UNESCO as an Intangible cultural heritage "in need of urgent safeguarding".

== Production process ==
The chief ingredients of Nabulsi soap are virgin olive oil, water, and an alkaline sodium compound. The compound is made by mixing the powdered ashes of the barilla plant (qilw), which grows along the banks of the River Jordan, with locally supplied lime (sheed). The sodium compound is then heated with water and olive oil in large copper vats over fermentation pits. The solution of water and sodium compound becomes increasingly concentrated in a series of 40 cycles repeated over eight days. During that time, an oar-shaped wooden tool known as a dukshab is used to stir the liquid soap continuously. The liquid soap is then spread in wooden frames to set. After setting, it is cut into the classic cube shape of Nabulsi soap and stamped with the company's trademark seal. The soap cubes then undergo a drying process that can last from three months to a year, and involves stacking them in ceiling-high structures resembling cones with hollow centers that allow the air to circulate around them.

The finished product is ivory-colored and has almost no scent. (Perfumes are never used in Nabulsi soap.) Before leaving the factory, the individual cubes that are to be sold locally are wrapped by hand in paper that is waxed on one side. Cubes that are destined for export are left unwrapped and usually dispatched in stiff sacks to protect them from damage.

== In culture ==
Considered an important aspect of Nablus's cultural heritage, the preservation of the Nabulsi soap-making industry has been the focus of several local projects, including the restoration and conversion of the old Arafat soap factory into a Cultural Heritage Enrichment Center. The center has research and exhibition facilities and includes a small model soap factory that makes Nabulsi soap using traditional methods. Project Hope and other local non-governmental organizations market the soap in the West to raise funds for their other community projects.

== Gallery ==
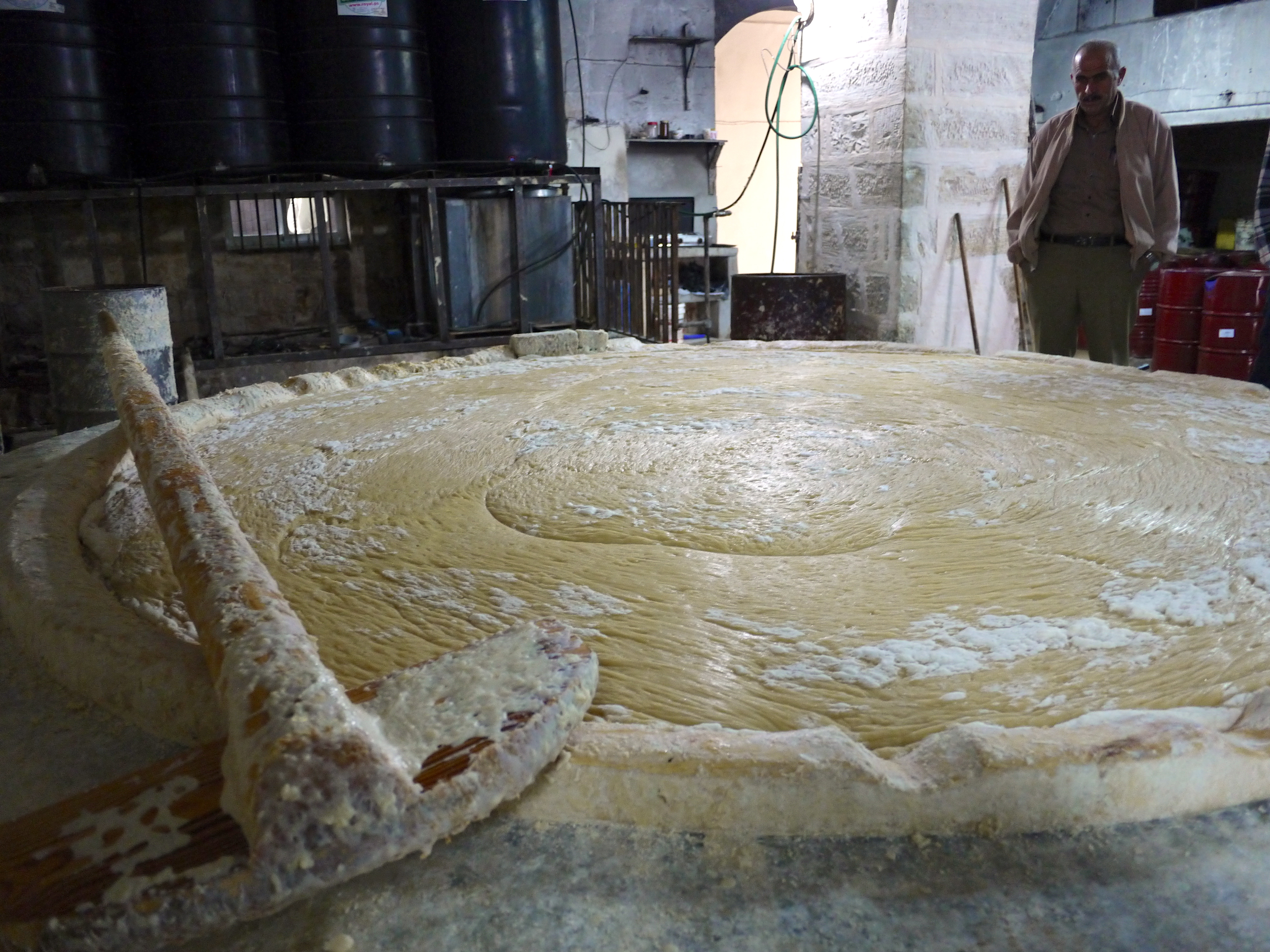
The cooking of ingredients is done by Al Tabbeekha or the cooks. Photo at the Shaka'a factory.

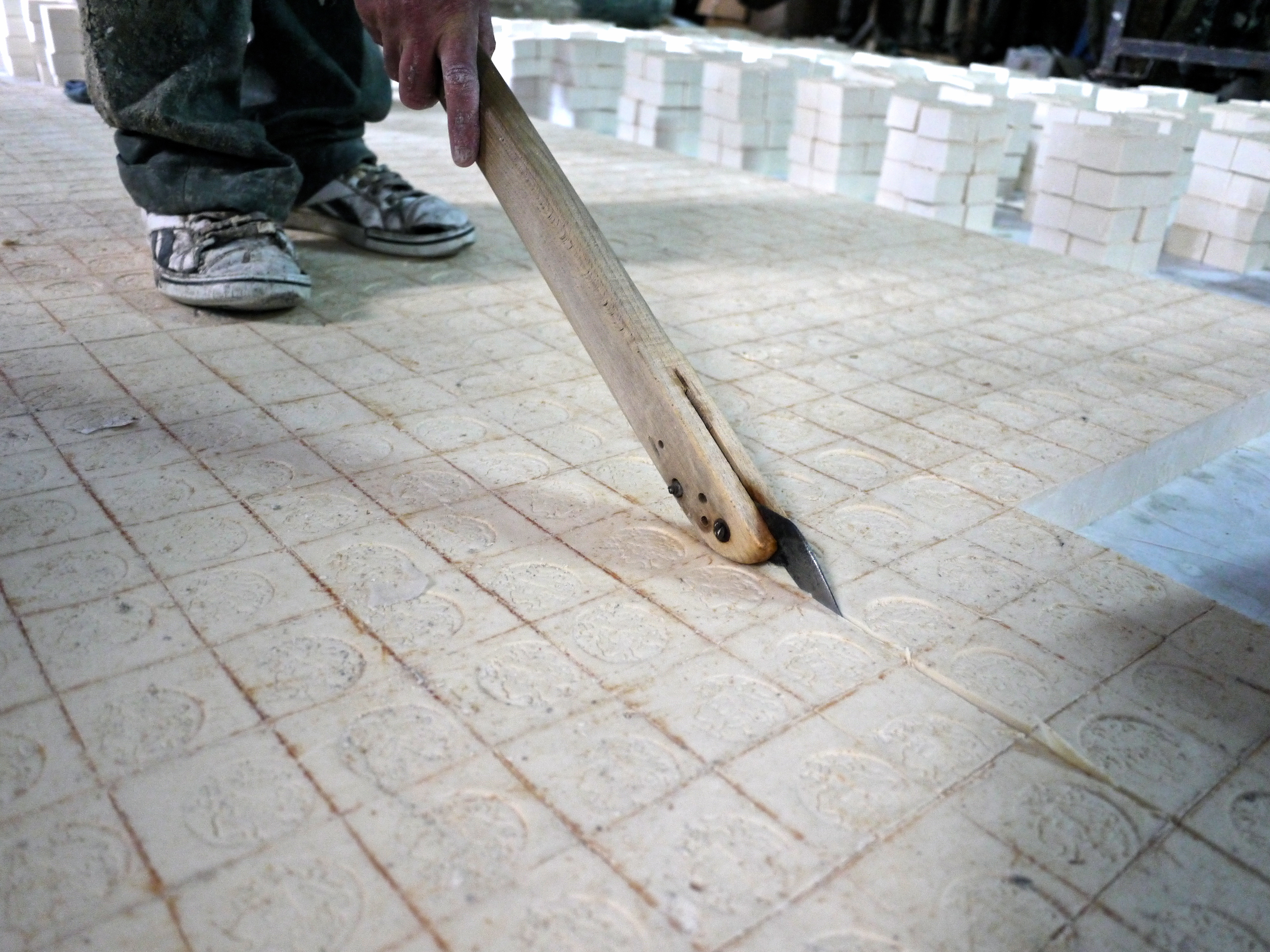
The craftspeople who are specialized in cutting soap are locally known as Al Bikar. Photo at the Shaka'a factory.

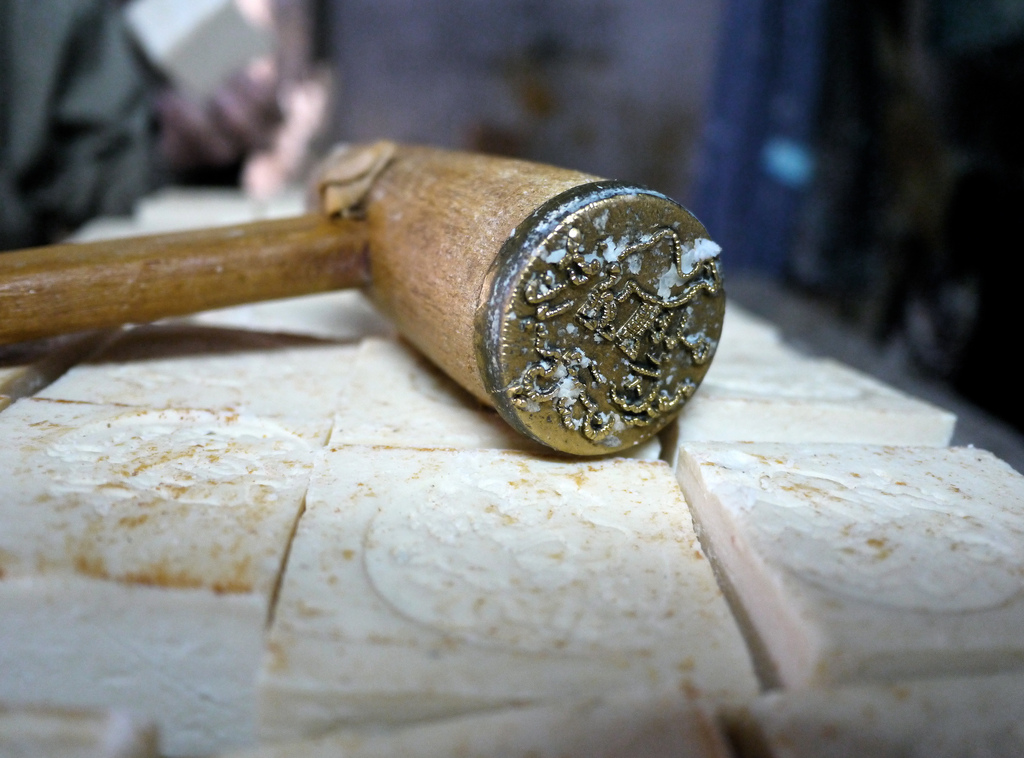
Al Khatimeh or the stampers hand-stamp each soap bar with its brand logo. Photo at the Shaka'a factory.

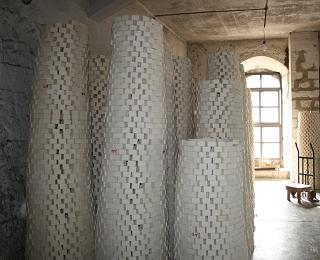
Soap stacks inside the Touqan factory in Nablus in 2008

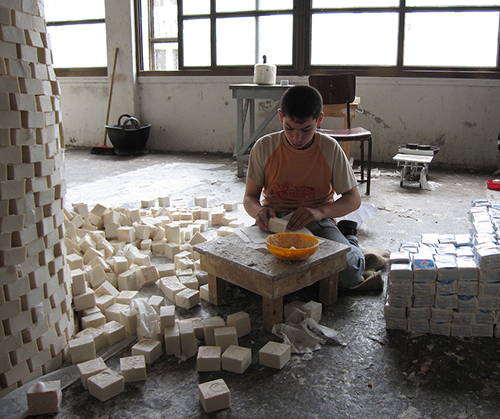
Al Lafeefah or the wrappers are tasked to wrap the soap bars.

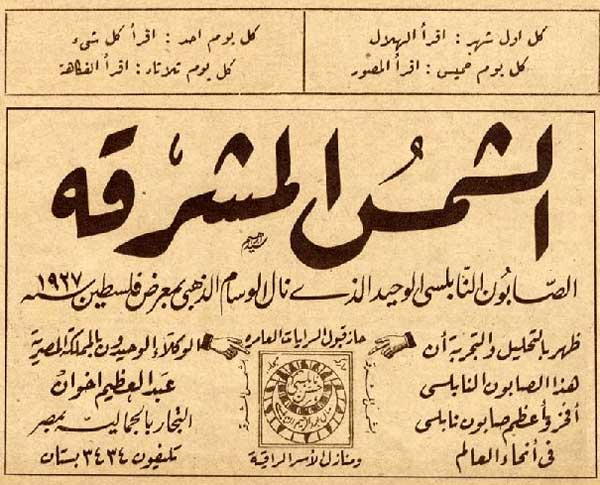
A 1927 ad for Nabulsi soap that ran in the Egyptian Al-Ahram newspaper. The logo is seen in the bottom middle.

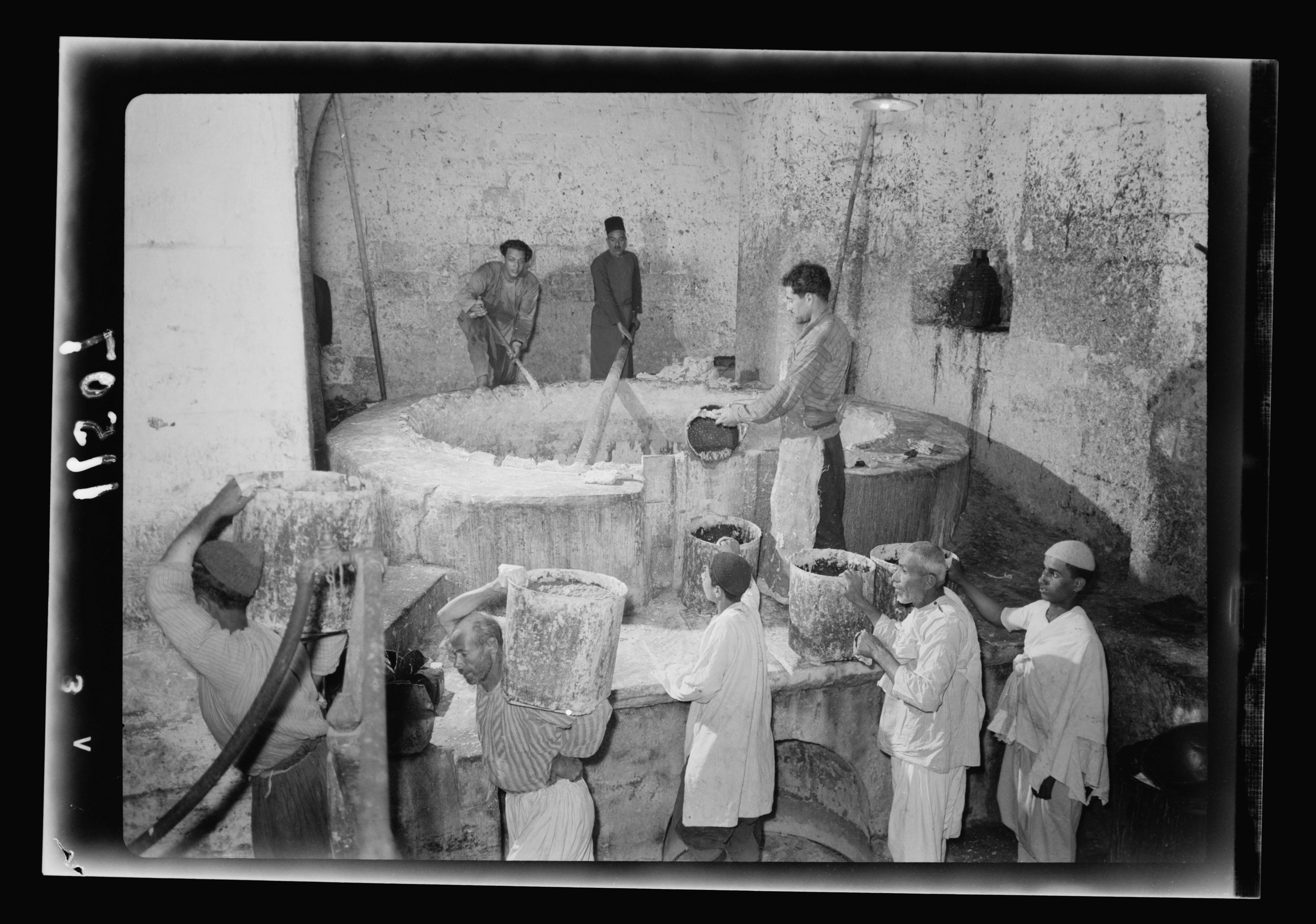
A soap factory in Nablus. The boiling pot liquid soap being carried to stock room. By the Matson Photo Service. c. 1940.

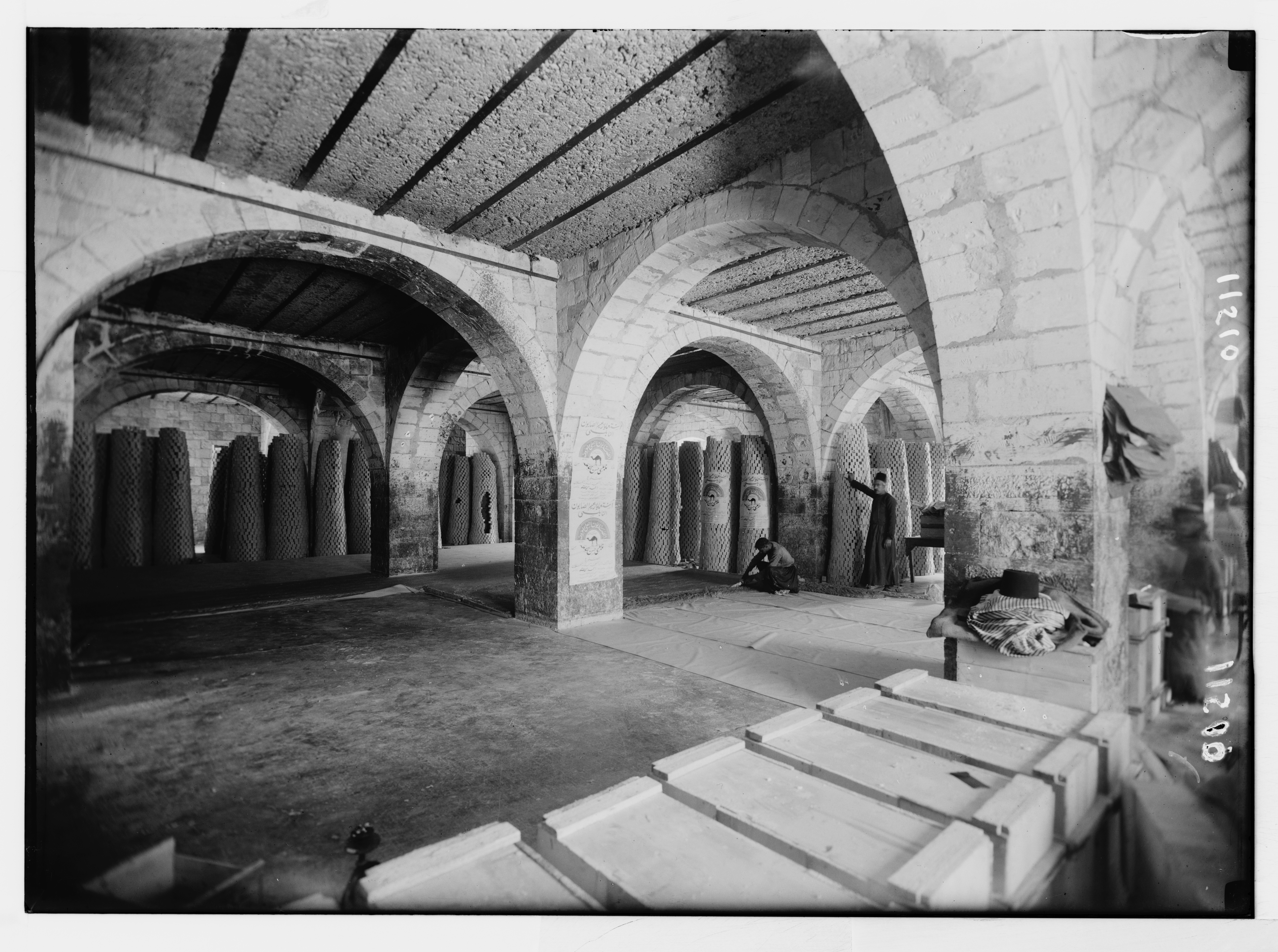
A factory in operation, men working are seen on the right, soap drying is seen on the left. c. 1940. By the Matson Photo Service.

== See also ==
- Palestinian handicrafts
- Aleppo soap
- Castile soap
- Marseille soap
- Vegan soap
- African black soap
- Azul e branco soap

== Bibliography ==
- Bontemps, Véronique (1 June 2012). "Soap Factories in Nablus: Palestinian Heritage (Turâth) at the Local Level". Journal of Balkan and Near Eastern Studies. 14 (2): 279–295. doi:10.1080/19448953.2012.681939. ISSN 1944-8953.
- Doumani, B. (1995). "Rediscovering Palestine Merchants and Peasants in Jabal Nablus, 1700-1900". University of California Press.
- Krämer, G. (2008). A History of Palestine: From the Ottoman Conquest to the Founding of the State of Israel. Princeton University Press.
- Le Strange, G. (1890). Palestine Under the Moslems: A Description of Syria and the Holy Land from A.D. 650 to 1500. London: Committee of the Palestine Exploration Fund.
- Philipp, T.; Schäbler, B. (1998). The Syrian Land: Processes of Integration and Fragmentation: Bilād Al-Shām. Franz Steiner Verlag. ISBN 3-515-07309-4.
