= Moroccan black soap =

High-alkaline soap made from olives

Moroccan black soap or beldi soap is a kind of soap originating in Morocco. It is a high-alkaline soap made from olive oil and macerated olives, which give it its gel-like consistency and characteristic dark greenish-black color.

In the hammams of Morocco, black soap is used for cleansing, moisturizing the skin, and exfoliating. A pinch of soap is rubbed onto wet skin. After 5–10 minutes a coarse fabric washcloth called a kessa is used to remove dead skin. The soap is high in Vitamin E. Moroccan black soap should not be confused with African black soap from West Africa, as the ingredients and place of manufacture are quite different.

== See also ==
- Aleppo soap
- Castile soap
- Marseille soap
