= Project Hope (disambiguation) =

Project Hope may refer to:

- Project Hope, a public service project organized by the China Youth Development Foundation
- Project HOPE, a U.S. charitable health services organization
- Project Hope Palestine, a charitable organization for children's services in northern Palestine
- Project Hope (film), a 1961 short film about a hospital ship
- Project Hope (Singapore), a televised national fund raising event in Singapore
