= François Merklen =

French chemist (1876–1938)

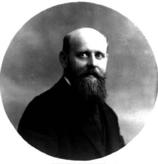
- Born: 1876; Thann, Haut-Rhin, Alsace, France
- Died: 1938; Salon-de-Provence, Bouches-du-Rhône, Provence-Alpes-Côte d'Azur, France
- Occupation: chemist

François Merklen (1876–1938) was a French chemist. He invented the modern formula to make Marseille soap. He worked for the Savonnerie Charles Roux fils in Marseille. In 1906, he authored Etudes sur la constitution des savons du commerce dans ses rapports avec la fabrication, published by Librairie Barlatier.
