= Soap substitute =

Cleaning product

A soap substitute is a natural or synthetic cleaning product used in place of soap or other detergents, typically to reduce environmental impact or health harms or provide other benefits.

Traditionally, soap has been made from animal or plant derived fats and has been used by humans for cleaning purposes for several thousand years. Soap is not harmful to human health but, like any natural or unnatural surfactant, it does have the potential to cause environmental harm by forming a surface film that impedes the diffusion of oxygen into the water if it is added to an aquatic environment faster than it can biodegrade.

Many washing agents today, from laundry and dish detergents to body wash and shampoos, are technically not soap, but synthetic detergents. They also often contain compounds that have been found to be harmful to human and wildlife health as well as to the environment. In this context, "Soap Substitutes" refers to cleansing products that significantly reduce or eliminate some or all of the components that have the potential to cause human or environmental harm. Throughout the last 100 years many changes have been made to the formulas of cleansing agents for these purposes, but the process of developing effective substitute detergent formulations that are completely harmless to humans and the environment is ongoing.

== Synthetic surfactants ==
Petroleum derived synthetic detergents became popular in the United States during World War II due to shortages of animal and plant-derived fats and because they worked better when cleaning with hard water than traditional soap. By the 1950s, synthetic detergents were more commonly used than traditional soap in the United States. Many of the first synthetic detergents were made from compounds that contained branched carbon chains, which persist in the environment for far longer than their linear counterparts. Consequently, this led to the buildup of these foamy surfactants in water treatment plants as well as the formation of large flotillas of foam in waterways. Public pressure led the US and Europe to ban the use of alkyl benzene sulphonate (ABS) and other branched chain surfactants in 1965.

This sparked great interest in the development of synthetic detergents that biodegrade into environmentally friendly byproducts. Such interest has led to the development of the linear carbon chain compounds commonly used today, such as sodium lauryl sulfate and sodium laureth sulfate/ sodium lauryl ether sulfate (SLS/SLES). While these surfactants are still derived from petroleum, a nonrenewable resource, and have been shown to cause mild to moderate irritation of skin, they biodegrade significantly faster, and this has led to a drastic reduction in surfactant pollution of waterways. While the environmental friendliness of the biodegradation byproducts of the surfactants most commonly used today varies, the United States Environmental Protection Agency (EPA) monitors and regulates claims made by companies about the environmental friendliness and potential toxicity of the biodegradation byproducts of their cleansing products.

There have been continued efforts to develop surfactants that are milder to humans and pose less risk to the environment. An emerging substitute for synthetic petroleum derived surfactants such as SDS are Alkyl polyglycosides (APGs). They are derived from plant based substances such as palm oil or wheat and exposure of APGs to skin and eyes is considerably safer than their petroleum derived counterparts. Studies have shown APG use, even in large quantities, pose no measurable environmental risk, while others report that more research is needed to confirm the true environmental impact of APGs. Although the use of APG surfactants currently have some disadvantages, such as the relatively high cost of production and uncertainties about the potential environmental impact of large scale use, further research into the development of APG surfactants shows a promising path to the creation of a naturally derived, non-toxic and environmentally friendly substitute for petroleum derived surfactants that is inexpensive, equally effective, and mass producible.

== Phosphates in detergent products ==
Another environmental issue with synthetic detergents is the addition of phosphates to these cleaning products. Phosphates are added to detergent as tripolyphosphate or as sodium/potassium phosphate. Phosphates interact with other ions in solution, like Calcium and Magnesium, to improve the washing ability of the detergent, especially when washing with hard water. Phosphates have also been shown to aid in killing germs when used in washing. However, most wastewater treatment processes generally remove only a small fraction of the phosphate in the water, and subsequently large quantities are released into waterways.

When large quantities of phosphates accumulate in waterways, it causes a bloom in algae and a subsequent lack of oxygen in the water, which severely damages the aquatic ecosystem. This process is called "eutrophication". In 1959 detergents contained 7–12% phosphate by weight, by 1969 this increased to 15–17% by weight. It is believed that during its peak use in the 1970s, half of all phosphates released by human activity was from detergents.

Newfound knowledge of eutrophication from scientific research in the 1940s and 1950s along with the occurrence of massive algal blooms during the 1960s–1970s in waterways like Lake Erie led to significant public concern about the increasing pollution in lakes and rivers. People believed phosphates from detergents to be a major cause. This led to a demand for methods of removal of phosphate from wastewater during the treatment. The first processes designed to remove phosphates from municipal wastewater (for environmental purposes) were implemented in the 1960s.

During this time, two main processes were used; phosphates were removed from the wastewater by either chemical precipitation or through biological mechanisms. Further investment and research into phosphate removal methods led to the development of the modern multiphase biological reactor for removal of phosphorus-containing compounds. Despite the technological advances made in phosphate removal processes, most were designed for use in large water treatment facilities that have advanced monitoring capabilities and expert operating technicians on site. As of 1999, only 7% of municipal wastewater treatment facilities in the United States have the tertiary treatment processes needed to remove greater than 20% of the phosphate from affluent wastewater. Even today, there remains a lack of technologies for phosphate removal in the smaller water treatment facilities found in non-urban areas.

By the early 1970s there was also significant public pressure on the United States government to ban phosphates in detergent cleansing products and congressional hearings on the topic were held. Detergent manufacturers explored the use of other compounds as a potential substitute for phosphates such as nitrile-tri-acetic acid (NTA), gluconic acid, citric acid, and polyelectrolytes. Ultimately, effective detergent formulations using citric acid and polyelectrolytes were developed and in some cases even sold; but they were not a comparable substitute to phosphate containing detergent formulations, either economically or in cleaning ability. While these hearings did not result in any direct regulation of the phosphate content of detergent by the federal government, they were part of the many hearings that led to the Clean Water Act of 1972.

Major soap manufactures resisted an outright ban on phosphates, and in 1970 voluntarily agreed to lower phosphate concentrations in detergents to 8.7%. Although the US federal government has made no legislation banning phosphates in laundry detergent, between 1971 and 1990, most US states independently banned or strictly limited it. In 1994, the Soap and Detergent Association (today known as the American Cleaning Institute (ACI)), a coalition representing most major detergent manufactures, voluntarily agreed to ban phosphates in consumer laundry detergents. Notably, this ban did not include dish detergents. Procter and Gamble, a detergent industry giant and ACI member, did not remove phosphates from all of their brands of laundry detergent (Tide, Ariel, Ace, and Bounty) until 2016.

By 2010, many US states and municipalities also enacted regulations on the use of phosphates in dishwashing detergent. At that time, The American Cleaning Institute announced a voluntary ban on the use of phosphates in all dish detergents. Despite this, Procter & Gamble’s sustainability reports only report the complete removal of phosphates from its Fairy and Dreft brand dish detergent; and these changes were not enacted until 2017.

The European Union took a different path than the United States. They banned the use of phosphates in consumer laundry and dish detergents in 2014 and 2017 respectively. Like the regulations enacted by many US states, these laws did not apply to the use of phosphates in commercial products.

Although there are a number of exceptions to the laws and bans that allow phosphate use in detergent products and it is not entirely clear of the degree in which detergent manufacturers complied with their voluntary bans, there has been a significant reduction in phosphate use in detergent products. Today, formulations with zeolites, polycarboxylates, citric acid, and sodium bicarbonate are among the most effective and popular substitutes for phosphates in detergent cleaning products. This, along with improved water treatment processes, has greatly contributed to a significant reduction in the amount of phosphate from detergent in waterways. These efforts have resulted in an overall reduction of the phosphate concentration in US waterways and some of the ecosystems most effected by eutrophication, such as Lake Erie, to show drastic improvement.

There are also opponents to eliminating phosphates in detergent. There are widespread claims that no effective substitute for phosphate has been developed, as many people report that when washing with phosphate free dish detergents, the dishes are left with a white film or spots on them. Opponents to bans of phosphate in dish detergents argue that efforts should be focused on developing an effective method of removal during the treatment process, not banning the product itself; which is both useful and unrivaled by any substitute. Additionally, there are arguments that phosphate is not the primary cause of eutrophication in coastal waters, and therefore phosphorus should not be regulated in these regions. This argument is based upon reports that the nitrogen content of coastal waters is limited (nitrogen is required for algal growth), therefore, reduction in phosphate use would have little effect on the amount of algae that can grow in these coastal areas.

== Enzyme additives ==
There have been more recent efforts to increase the environmental sustainability of laundry and dish detergents via the addition of enzymes that break down dirt and grease. Adding enzymes significantly reduces the amount of detergent needed to wash, and subsequently reduces the amount of surfactant being put into waterways. Enzymes that have been designed to work at lower temperatures can also significantly reduce the amount of energy needed to wash clothes. For example, when using a top-load washer, switching from using "hot/warm" or "warm/warm" cycle to a "cold/cold" cycle uses 15 times and 11.6 times less energy, respectively. This technology has already been implemented by companies like Tide, in its Cold Water Clean Laundry Detergent.

== Hazardous additives ==
Automatic dishwashing detergent is poisonous if swallowed. Formaldehyde, while not intentionally added, has also been found in some detergent cleansing products. Per the Centers for Disease Control and Prevention (CDC), exposure to formaldehyde at low levels from inhalation increases one’s risk of cancer and the EPA classifies formaldehyde as a B1 probable carcinogen.

There has also been recent concern about potential environmental and health risks associated with an antimicrobial agent called triclosan. Triclosan is found in so many consumer products that it is believed that 75% of all Americans have been exposed to it. While research on the health and environmental risks of triclosan are far from complete, studies have shown it is dermally absorbed and retained in the body and it has also been shown to disrupt biological processes. Investigations of the chemical properties of triclosan have revealed it has the potential to accumulate and persist in the environment. In 2016, the FDA banned the marketing of triclosan, along with several other antimicrobial agents, in antibacterial detergent products because "manufactures did not demonstrate that the ingredients are both safe for long-term daily use and more effective than plain soap and water in preventing illness and the spread of certain infections". In the US, triclosan is still used in toothpaste, mouthwash, hand sanitizer, and surgical soaps. In 2017, the European Union banned triclosan from all personal hygiene products.

Even though the fragrances in scented cleaning products have been shown to release volatile and potentially harmful compounds into the air, fragrance ingredients are not required to be listed by manufactures. Artificial fragrances can cause sensitivity, allergies, and rashes and some of these chemicals are known carcinogens and endocrine disruptors.

== Informed choices ==
There are still many compounds that are potentially damaging to human and environmental health found in many detergent cleaning products; and just because a product is labeled as "green" does not mean it is safe. If people are concerned about being exposed to harmful compounds through detergent products, it is best to do their own research on how to decide which product is best for them using a reliable source, such as the EPA’s "Safer Choice" program, which provides consumers with safety information of products like dish, laundry, and hand detergents.

There are many small companies that offer soaps claimed to be made the traditional way (from all natural fats and contain no harmful additives, such as Rocky Mountain Soap Co. and Dr. Squatch Soap Co). There are also companies that claim to sell all natural and additive free laundry soaps, but many of these soaps still contain an additive called borax, which has been shown to cause irritation to skin, eyes, and lungs as well as reproductive and kidney damage if swallowed or inhaled.

Additionally, one can ensure their soap is all natural and contains no potentially harmful additives by making their own soap at home. There are many resources for instructions on making soap at home, and the only required ingredients are plant or animal fat, water, and lye (sodium hydroxide). It is also noteworthy that there are many homemade products that are highly efficient at cleaning, such as hot water, vinegar, baking soda, lemon juice, salt, coffee powder, ascorbic acid, and grapefruit extract.

== Soap substitute plants ==
- The soap plant group (amole root, soap plant root, soaproot bulb)
- Guaiac leaves
- Papaya leaves
- Quillaia bark
- Red campion root and leaves
- Atriplex root
- Sapindus fruit
- Passiflora foetida
- Alphitonia excelsa
- Soap pod fruit (various acacias)
- Mojave yucca root
- Red quinoa
- Soapwort root
- Our Lord's Candle root
- Wild gourd fruit (Cucurbita foetidissima[?])
- Coralberry plant
- Yucca plant

== See also ==
- Green cleaning
- Vegan soap
