= Azul e branco soap =

Type of soap used in Portugal

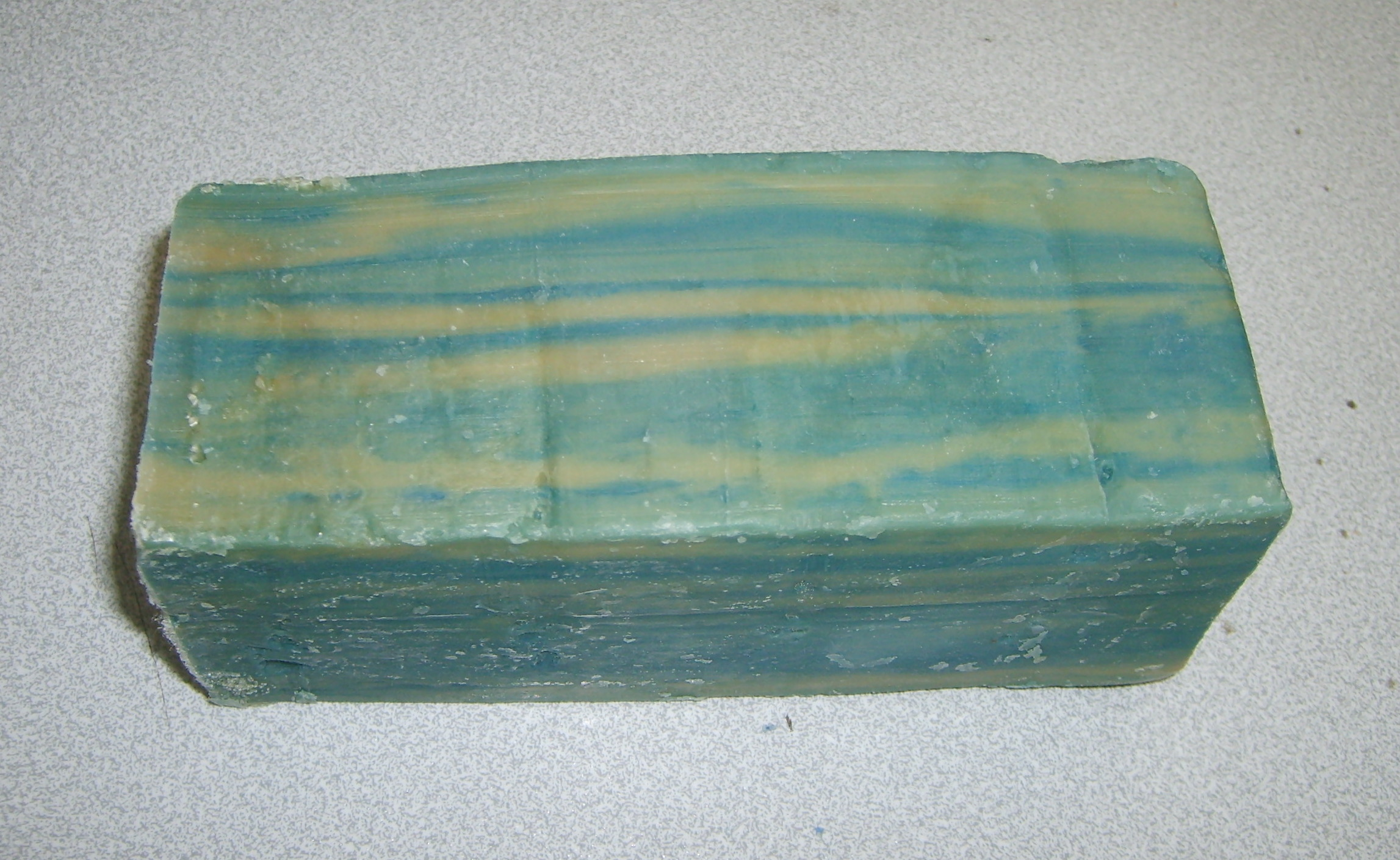
Azul e Branco soap

Azul e branco (blue and white), also known as sabão Offenbach (Offenbach soap) or sabão macaco (monkey soap), is a type of soap used in Portugal. It is comparable to household soap, but has a rugged texture, bulky shape, lack of odor, and can generally be purchased in many convenience stores and supermarkets. In Portuguese "azul e branco" literally means "blue and white", which are the distinctive colours of the soap. It can also be found in red and white.

Given the size of a loaf of soap (a long six-sided prism weighing approximately 1.5 kg, 3.3 lb), it must be cut to the desired size before use.

Formerly, azul e branco soap was popularly used to wash linens, carpets, and floors, as well as for personal hygiene.

Popular brands include Clarim, Confiança and Solavar.

== Uses ==
Being more effective than normal soap, it was formerly used to disinfect operating theatres. With the advent of the 2009 Influenza A virus pandemic, the Portuguese health minister advised the population to use it as a substitute for the alcohol-based hand cleaners that emerged at that time.

Its usage has greatly declined in recent years as more attractive soaps and detergents become more common, but around 6,000 metric tons are still produced every year.

Due to the COVID-19 pandemic caused by the novel SARS coronavirus 2 (SARS-CoV-2), azul e branco soap is again being put into use by public institutions, namely in bathrooms. Commercial demand is also increasing as stocks decline and prices rise, with schools and home consumers being the main customers.

== See also ==
- Aleppo soap
- Castile soap
- Marseille soap
- Nabulsi soap
