= With Hands United =

Song by Taufik Batisah, Daren Tan, Maiya Rahman, Mathilda D'Silva
- Released: 2009
- Songwriters: Mayuni Omar; Sharmila Melissa Yogalingam; Mathilda D'Silva

With Hands United is the theme song for Project Hope, a national televised fundraising program in Singapore. It is written by Mayuni Omar, Sharmila Melissa Yogalingam, and Singapore Idol contestant Mathilda D'Silva.

The theme song was performed in 2009 by Taufik Batisah, Daren Tan, Maiya Rahman and Mathilda D'Silva. Taufik Batisah performed the song again in 2010, along with Sylvia Ratonel, Ayu, Tomok, Petra Sihombing and Angel.

The song, along with its writers, were nominated for the Pesta Perdana Awards in 2011 for Best Theme Song.
