= Hard soap =

Kind of soap

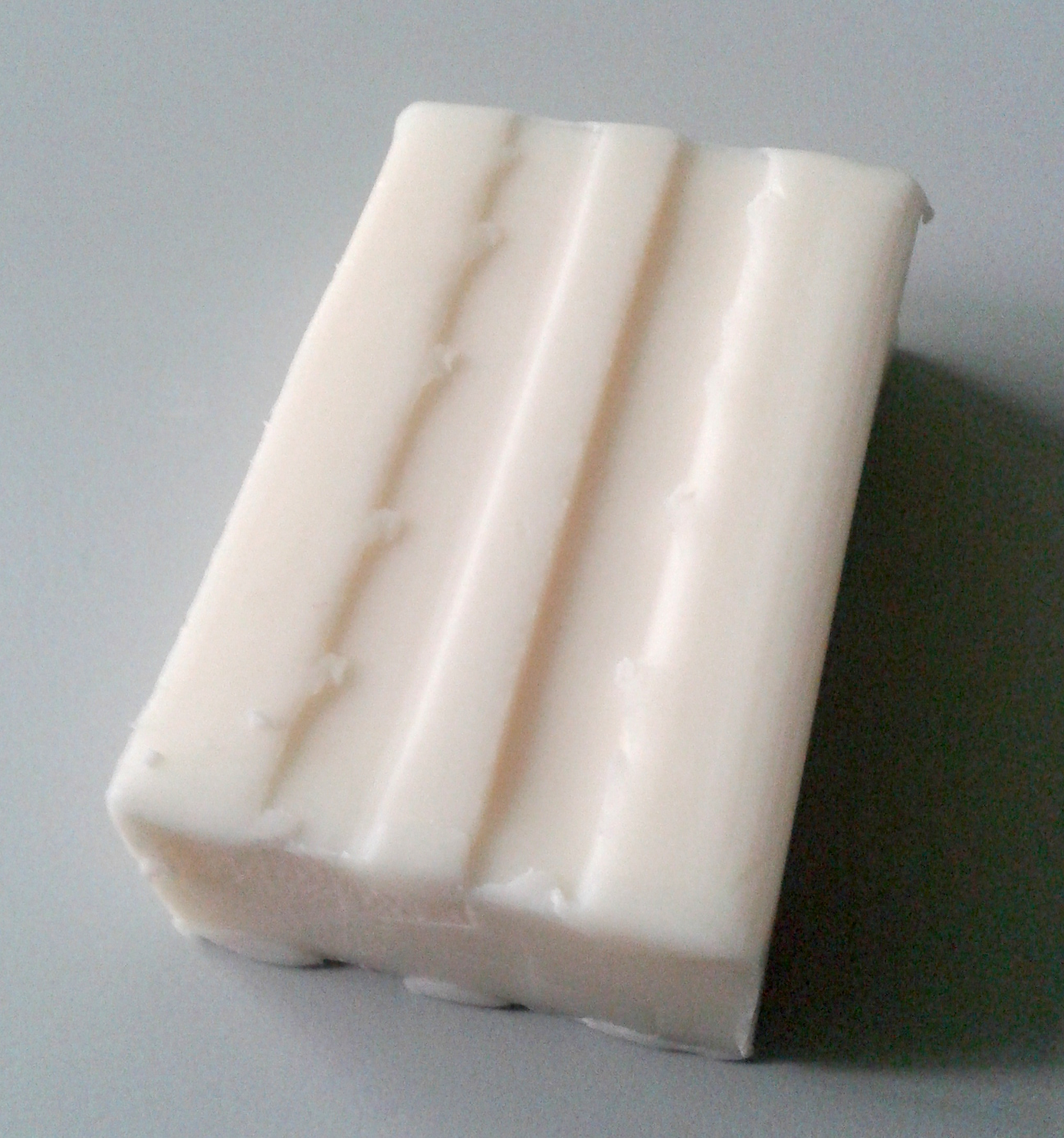
German hard soap

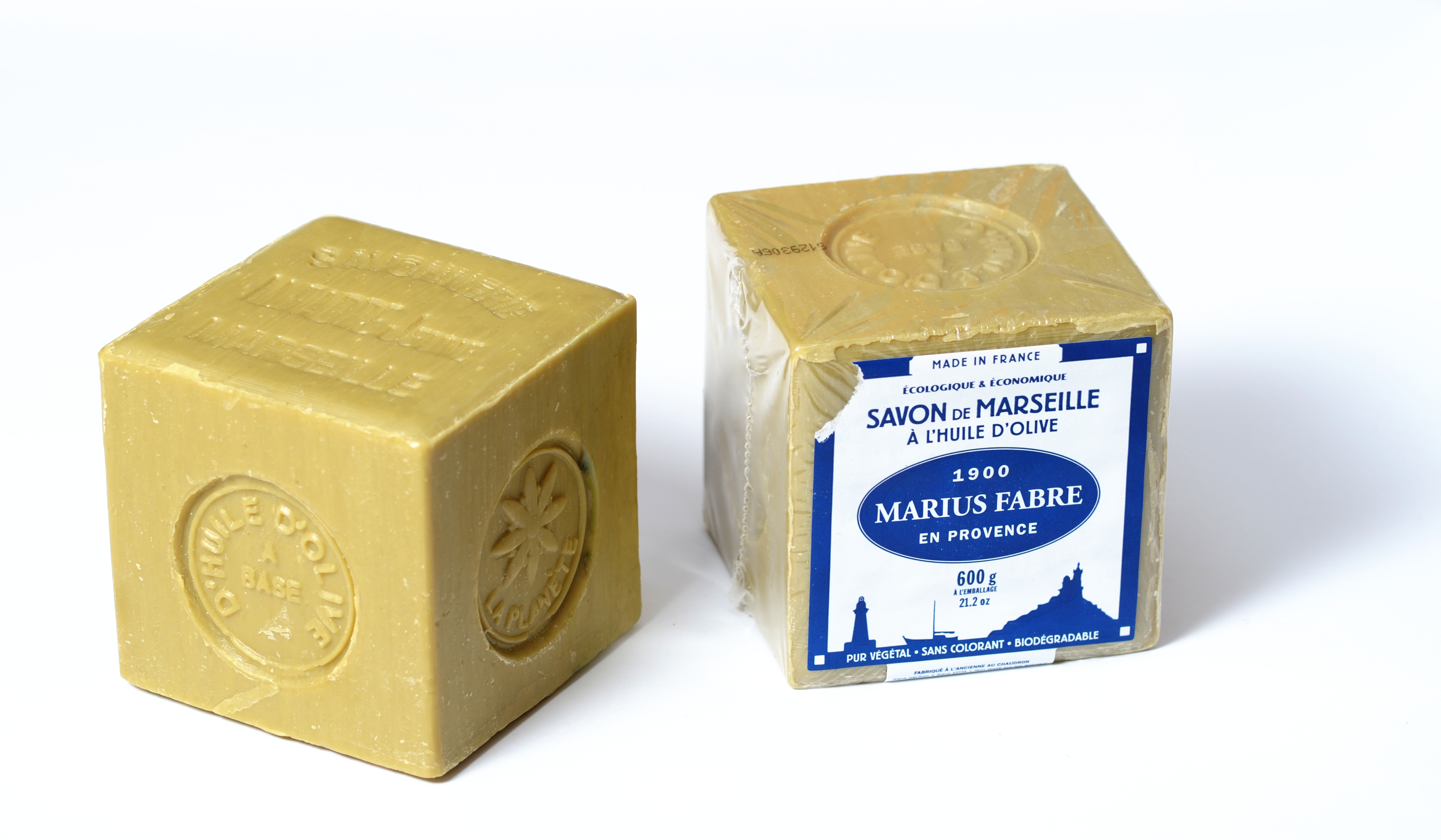
French hard soap (Marseille)

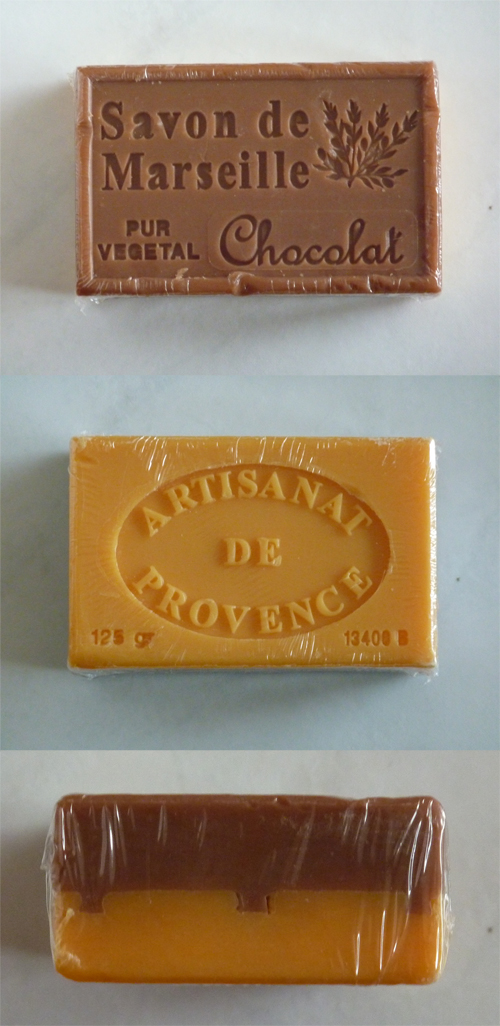
Layered, packaged French hard soap

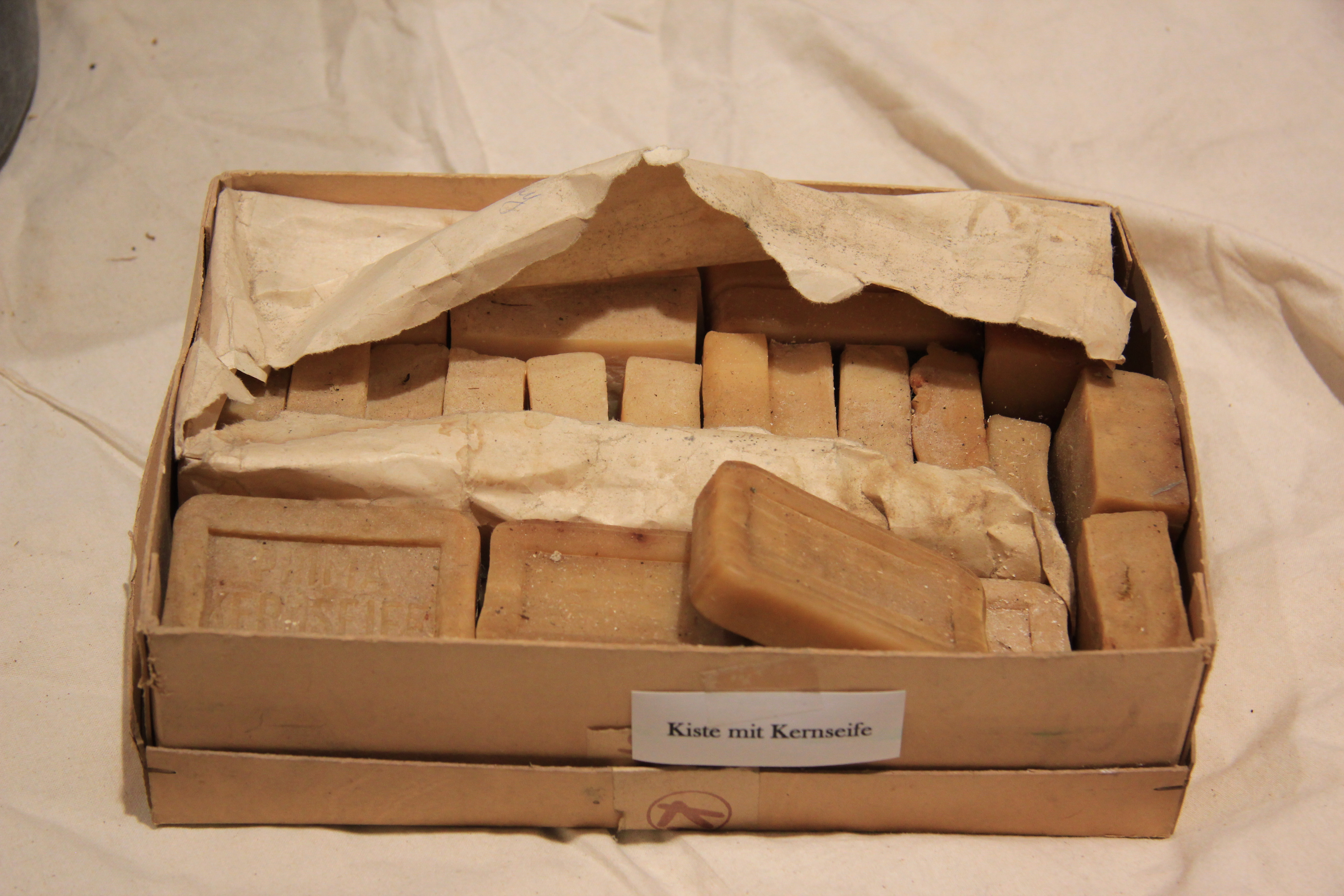
Box of Austrian hard soap (circa 1914)

Hard soaps (Latin: sapo medicatus), also termed soda soaps in older terminology, are categorized under soaps and are typically sodium salts of fatty acids. They vary in color from white to brownish and have a fatty acid content ranging 72–75%. These soaps are typically made from lower-quality fats. Hard soaps serve as the foundation for products frequently labeled as fine soaps, which are fortified with nourishing additives, perfumes, and dyes.

== Naming ==
The term hard soap originates from the soap production process. During this process, the addition of salt (sodium chloride) to boiling soap mixed with a substantial amount of water causes the soap nucleus to separate and solidify, making it "harder" and allowing it to float on the surface.

== Production ==
Through the process of saponification, fats (like tallow, pig, and bone fats) or vegetable oils react with sodium hydroxide to form the sodium salts of fatty acids and glycerin. The resulting mixture is known as soft soap, which serves as a precursor for hard soap production. After adding sodium chloride (a process known as salting out), the soap nucleus rises and separates. The water-soluble glycerin and unwanted fat residues remain in the solution (see also soap).

== Properties and uses ==
The fatty acid salts formed during production constitute the actual soap and are effective cleaners due to their surfactant properties. Using soap helps dissolve many water-insoluble substances, like fats and oils, making them washable with water.

In most cases, hard soaps or products based on them are used for handwashing because they exhibit an alkaline (pH value above 7) nature and can irritate the skin when in contact with mucous membranes. Hard soap has antiseptic qualities and can be used alongside warm water as a household remedy for paronychia. It's also used to shape dreadlocks.

In the realm of detergents, soaps are generally secondary due to the creation of soap scum. They are primarily utilized as defoamers.

Beyond cleaning, soaps also treat wood surfaces. They enhance the appearance of conifer woods, seal the wood's pores, minimize dirt accumulation, and prevent staining from fats or embedded dyes. For cleaning brushes, especially in oil painting, hard soap ensures extended durability of the bristles or hairs.

On occasion, water-based soap solutions are employed for pest control on cultivated plants, like against thrips and aphids.

== See also ==
- Aleppo soap
- Castile soap
- Marseille soap
- Nablus soap
