= Project Hope (Singapore) =

Project Hope was a Singaporean fundraising programme organized by Mediacorp, and aired on various Mediacorp TV channels. Its aim is to raise funds for the needy and victims of natural disasters in the Asean region. Celebrity Asian television and film actors, famous singers and other well-known personalities from the region regularly appear on the show to perform and present, as part of the show's appeal to the public to donate. Mediacorp underwrites the full cost of the production of Project Hope.

The first Project Hope event was held on 19 October 2009, raising S$1,200,000. Another event was held on 19 November 2010, raising S$641,000. The 2010 event was also broadcast on Channel News Asia International.

Its theme song, 'With Hands United', was written by Mayuni Omar, Sharmila Melissa Yogalingam, and Singapore Idol contestant Mathilda D'Silva. The song, along with its writers, were nominated for the Pesta Perdana Awards in 2011 for Best Theme Song.
