= Glycerin soap =

Type of soap that contains glycerin, typically translucent

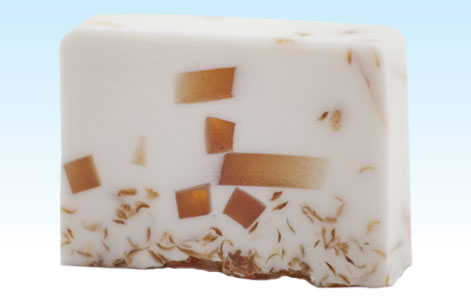
Soap du Jour glycerin soap

Glycerin soaps are soaps that contain glycerol, a component of fat or oil. They are recognizably different from other soaps because they are translucent. The clarity is due to the alignment of the soap molecules, which can be induced through the addition of alcohol and sugar. This is usually done for homemade glycerin soaps that are not remeltable.

The process for making glycerin soaps was well known as of 1857 in the Western world. In modern industrial soap-making, the glycerin is usually separated from the soap to be resold and used in a wide variety of areas such as for personal care products, pharmaceuticals, chemical intermediates, and food processing.

== Production ==
Glycerin soap is made by melting and continuously heating soap that has been partially dissolved in a high-percentage alcohol solution until the mixture reaches a clear, jelly-like consistency. The alcohol is added to a slow cooked hot-processed soap and then simmered with a sugar solution until the soap is clear or translucent, and then the simmered soap is chilled in a freezer. With home- and hand-made soaps that still contain glycerin left over from saponification, the grating, melting and cooking can proceed without the addition of anything to the mixture, though sugar or more glycerin is sometimes added. Glycerin soap can also be produced without remelting soap through directly cooking raw home-made soap.

Modern clear glycerin soaps bases are produced by combining various glycerol and polyols with soap and other surfactants in a manner similar to traditional glycerin soap-making methods. These modern clear soaps have the benefit of being easily re-meltable and are often sold in bulk to customers for melt-and-pour soap crafting.

== See also ==
- Vegan soap
