= Coralberry =

Coralberry is a common name for several plants and may refer to:

- Aechmea fulgens, an herb in the family Bromeliaceae native to Brazil
- Ardisia crenata, a shrub in the family Primulaceae native to Asia
- Ilex verticillata, a shrub in the family Aquifoliaceae native to eastern North America
- Symphoricarpos orbiculatus, a shrub in the family Caprifoliaceae native to eastern and central North America
