= Marseille soap =

Traditional hard soap made from vegetable oils

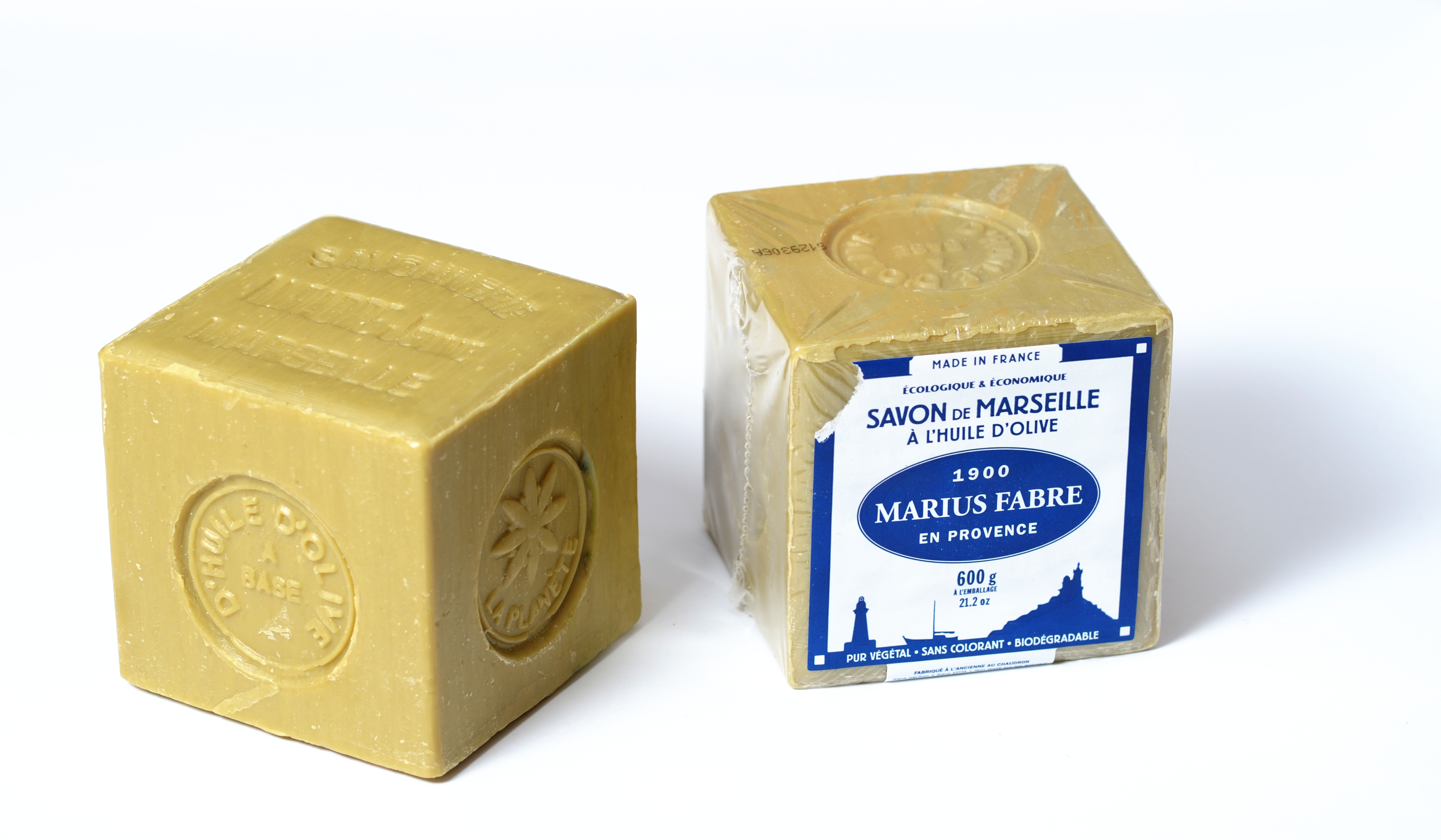
Marius Fabre Marseille soap in blocks of 600 g

Marseille soap or Savon de Marseille (French pronunciation: [savɔ̃ də maʁsɛj]) is a traditional hard soap made from vegetable oils that has been produced around Marseille, France, for about 600 years. The first documented soapmaker was recorded from the city in about 1370. By 1688, Louis XIV introduced regulations in the Edict of Colbert limiting the use of the name Savon de Marseille to olive oil based soaps. The law has since been amended to allow other vegetable oils to be used.

By 1913, production had reached 180,000 tons. Thus, in 1924, there were 122 soapmaking companies in the Marseille and Salon-de-Provence areas combined. However as of 2023, there were only four remaining, all part of an association called Union des Professionnels du Savon de Marseille (UPSM).

== Production ==
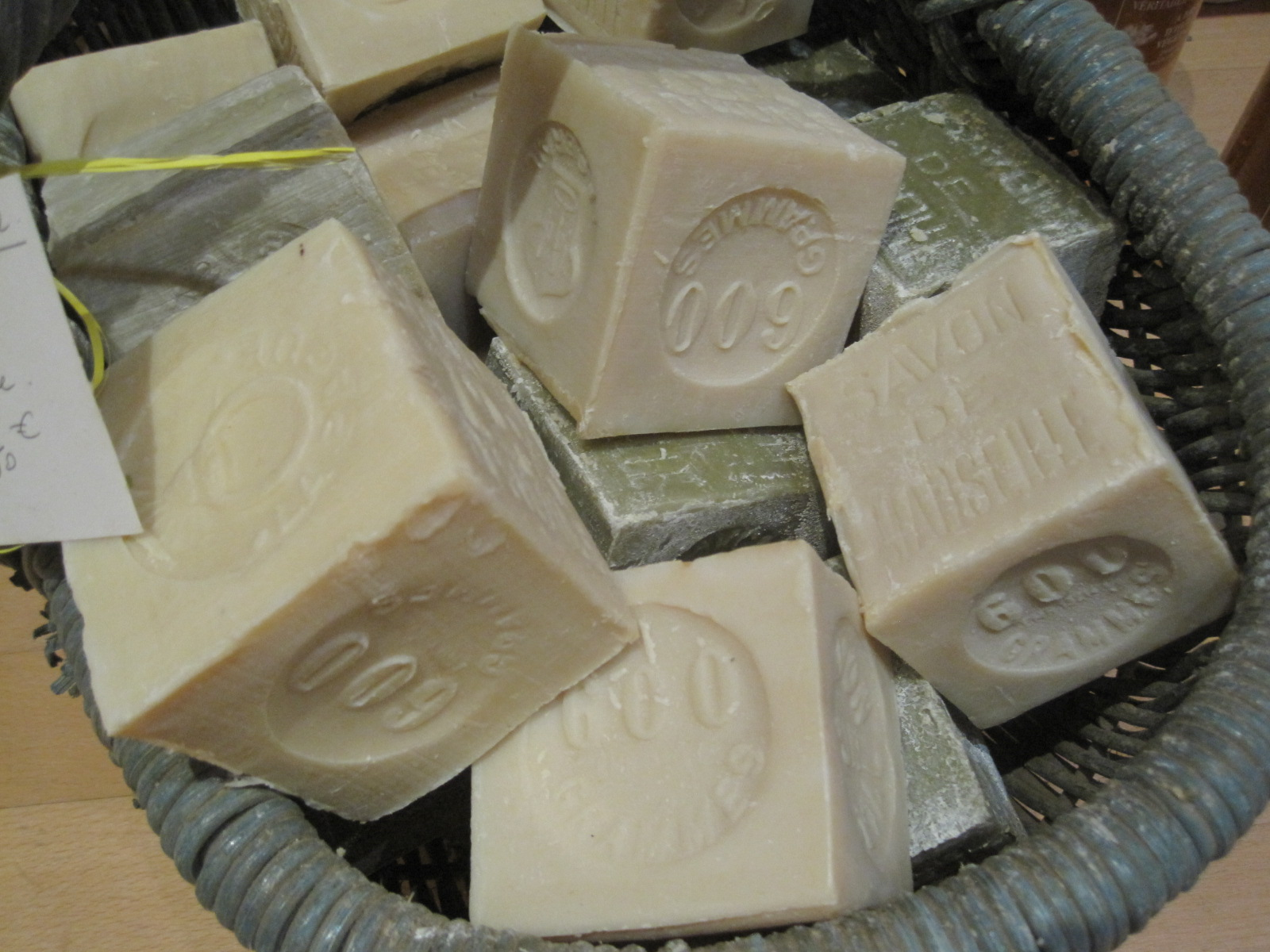
Marseille soap on sale in a street market of Marseille

Traditionally, the soap is made by mixing sea water from the Mediterranean Sea, olive oil, and the alkaline ash from sea plants together in a large cauldron (usually making about 8 tons). This mixture is then heated for several days while being stirred continuously. The mixture is allowed to sit until ready and is then poured into a mold and allowed to set slightly. While still soft it is cut into bars, stamped, and left to completely harden. The whole process can take fourteen days to a month.

== Today ==
Today there are two main types of Marseille soap: the original greenish-hued variety made with olive oil, and a white one made of palm and coconut oil mixture. Originally sold only in 5 kg (11 lb) and 20 kg (44 lb) blocks, they usually come in 300 g (11 oz) and 600 g (21 oz) squares nowadays. Though smaller and larger sizes are available, from 15 g (0.53 oz) "guest soap" up to a 10 kg (22 lb) self-slicing block.

Marseille soap is frequently used for domestic cleaning, including hand-washing of delicate garments such as those made of wool or silk. In its liquid form it is commonly sold as a hand soap. It can also be used in agriculture as a pesticide.

== See also ==
- Aleppo soap
- Algerian soap
- Azul e branco soap
- Castile soap
- Hot process
- Moroccan black soap
- Nabulsi soap
