= Popish soap =

Popish soap was a derisive name applied to soap manufactured under a patent granted by Charles I. Because the board of the manufacturing company included Catholics, the term Popish Soap (after The Pope) was applied to this monopoly commodity. It was said by anti-Catholics to be particularly harmful to linen and washerwomen's hands.

During the personal rule of the English King Charles I (1629–1640), one of the ways in which he attempted to raise money was through the granting of patents. This came about as a result of a loophole in the statute forbidding such action. One such patent was granted to a soap corporation. (Note: The statute forbade grants of monopolies to individuals but Charles circumvented the restriction by granting monopolies to companies.)

== Bibliography ==
- Coward, Barry (2003), The Stuart Age (3rd ed.), London: Longman, ISBN 978-0-582-77251-9
- Gregg, Pauline (1981), King Charles I, London: Dent, ISBN 0-460-04437-0
- Hibbert, Christopher (1968), Charles I, London: Weidenfeld & Nicolson
- Loades, D. M. (1974), Politics and the Nation, London: Fontana, ISBN 0-00-633339-7
