= Aleppo soap =

Soap of olive and laurel oil from Aleppo

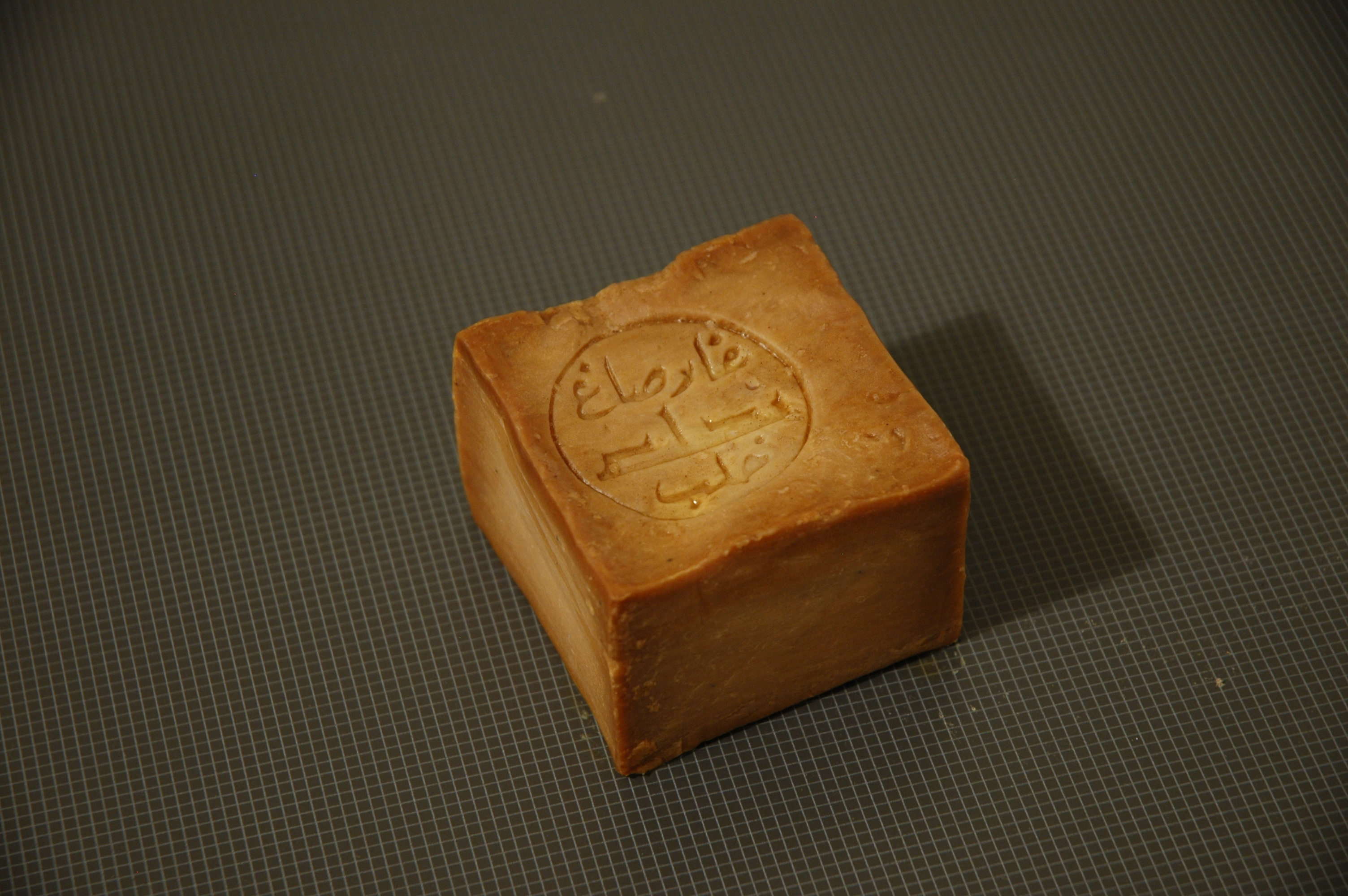
Aleppo soap

Aleppo soap (Arabic: صابون غَار, romanized: ṣābūn ghar, lit. 'Bay laurel soap') also known as savon d'Alep, laurel soap, Syrian soap, or ghar soap is a natural, handmade, hard bar soap originally from the city of Aleppo, Syria. Aleppo soap is classified as a Castile soap as it is a hard soap made from olive oil and lye, from which it is distinguished by the inclusion of laurel berry oil. Traditional Aleppo soap does not contain synthetic fragrances or artificial additives.

== History ==
The origin of Aleppo soap is unknown. Unverified claims of its great antiquity abound, such as its supposed use by Queen Cleopatra of Egypt and Queen Zenobia of Syria. Although it has been claimed that soap-making was introduced to the West from the Levant after the First Crusades, in fact, soap was known to the Romans in the first century AD and Zosimos of Panopolis described soap and soapmaking in c. 300 AD.

Today most Aleppo soap, especially that containing more than 16% of laurel oil (considered higher in quality), is exported to Europe and East Asia.

In December 2024, the "craftsmanship of Aleppo Ghar soap" was recognized by UNESCO as an intangible cultural heritage.

== Manufacturing process ==
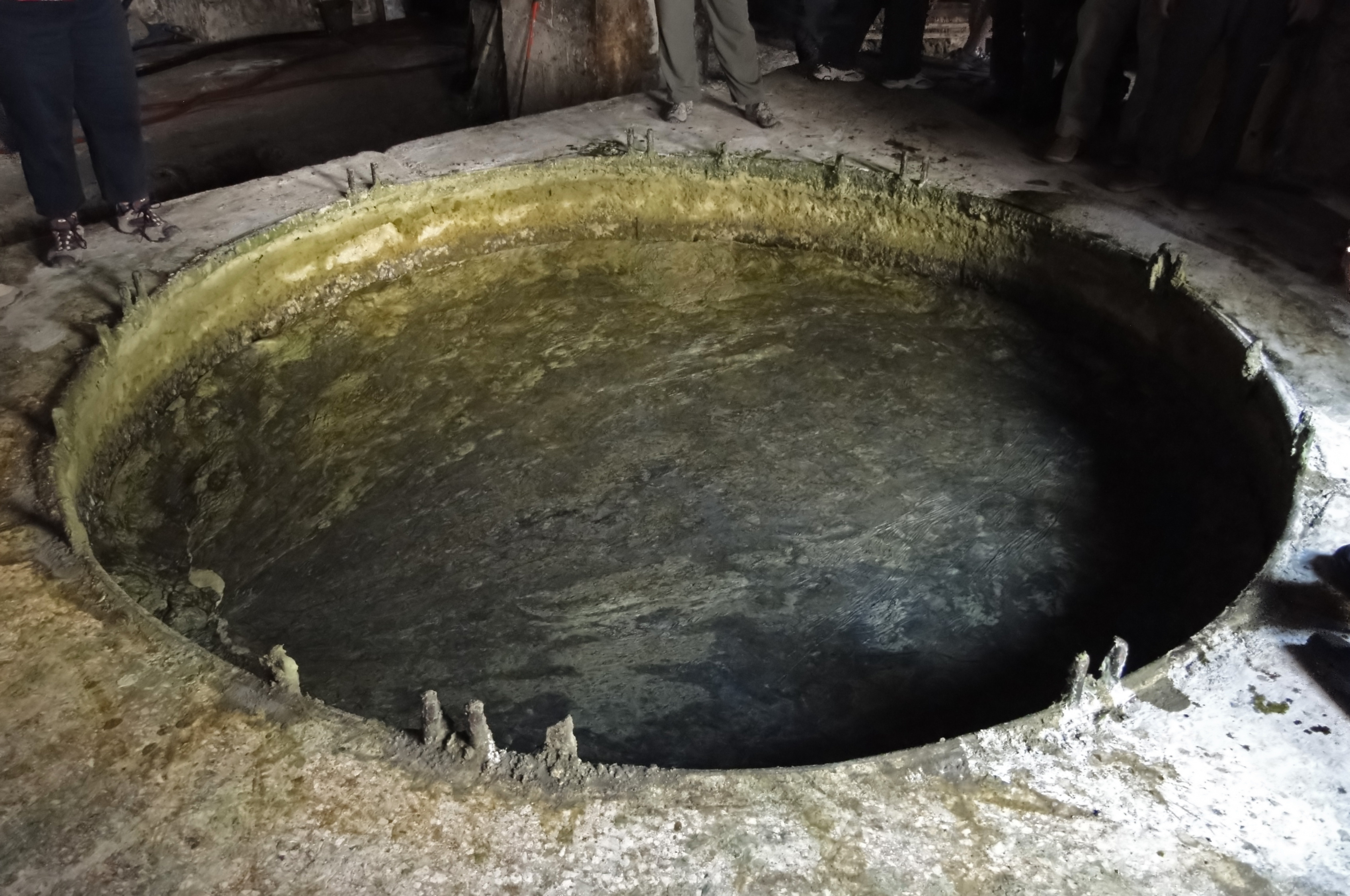
Soap in a vat

Traditional Aleppo soap is made by the "hot process". First, the olive oil is brought into a large, in-ground vat along with water and lye. Underneath the vat, there is an underground fire that heats the contents to a boil. Boiling lasts three days while the oil reacts with the lye and water to become a thick liquid soap.

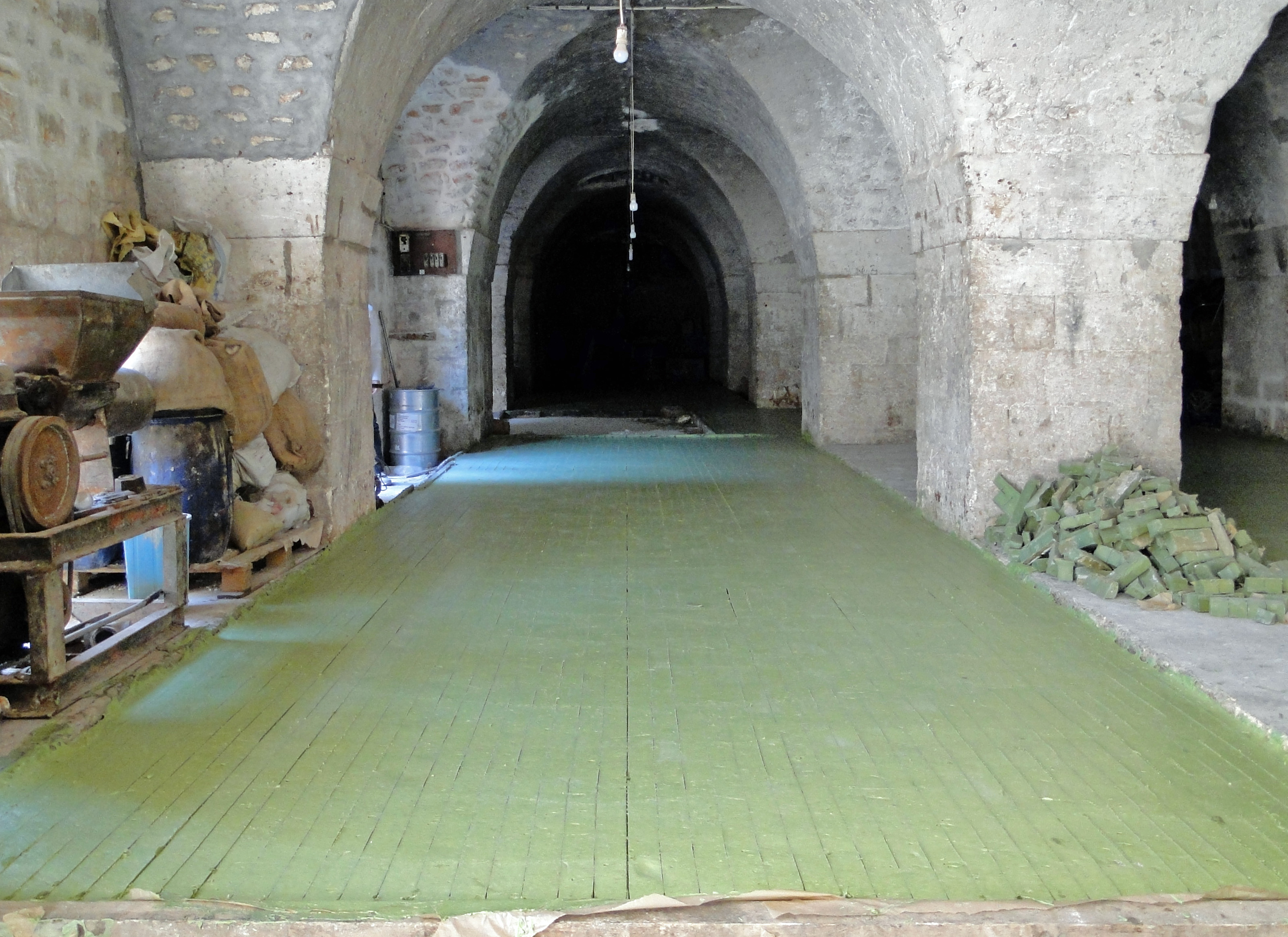
Soap cooling

The laurel oil is added at the end of the process, and after it is mixed in, the mix is taken from the vat and poured over a large sheet of waxed paper on the floor of the factory. At this point, the soap is a large, green, flat mass, and it is allowed to cool down and harden for about a day. While the soap is cooling, workers with planks of wood strapped to their feet walk over the soap to try to smooth out the batch and make it an even thickness.

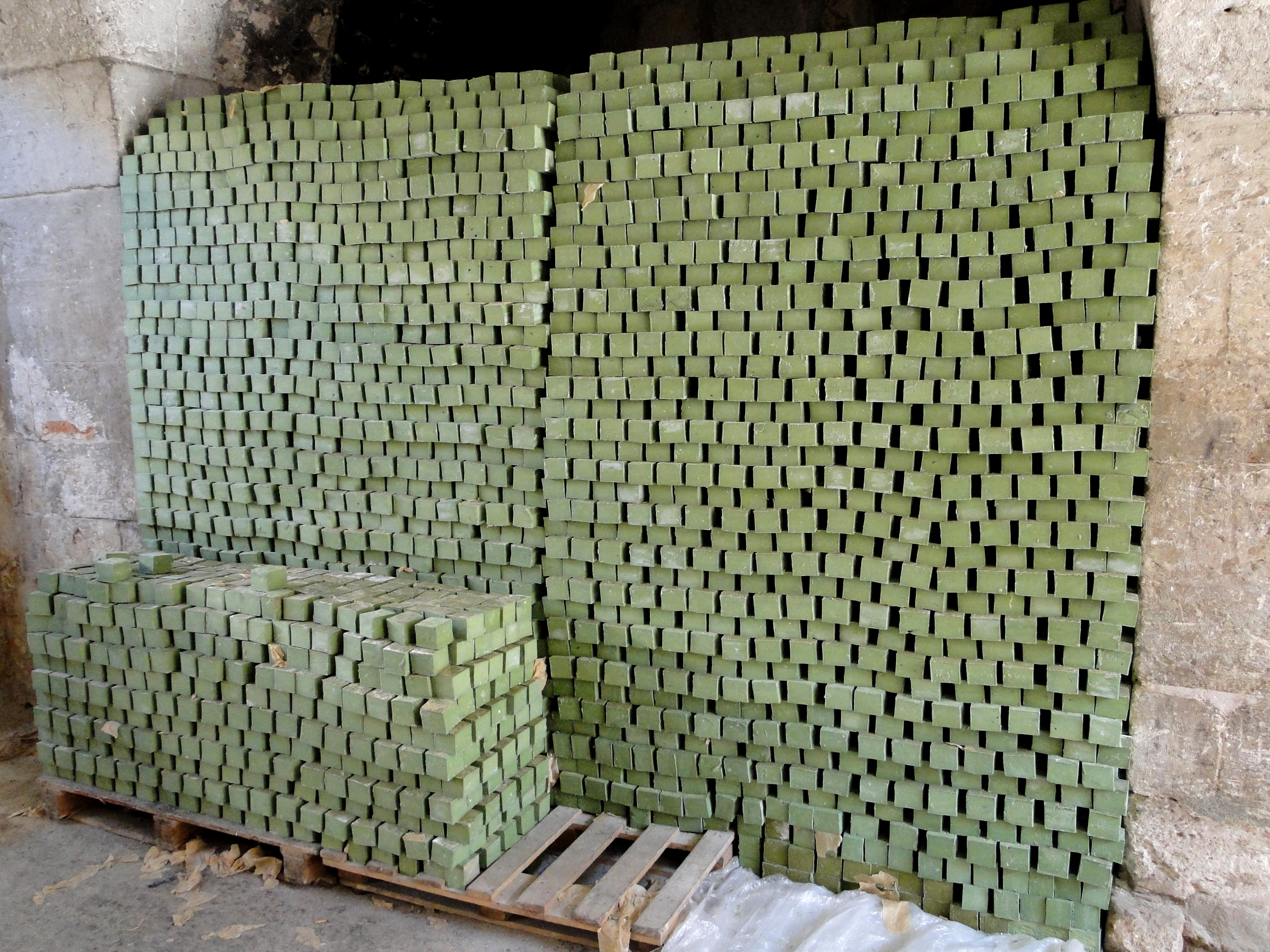
Final result

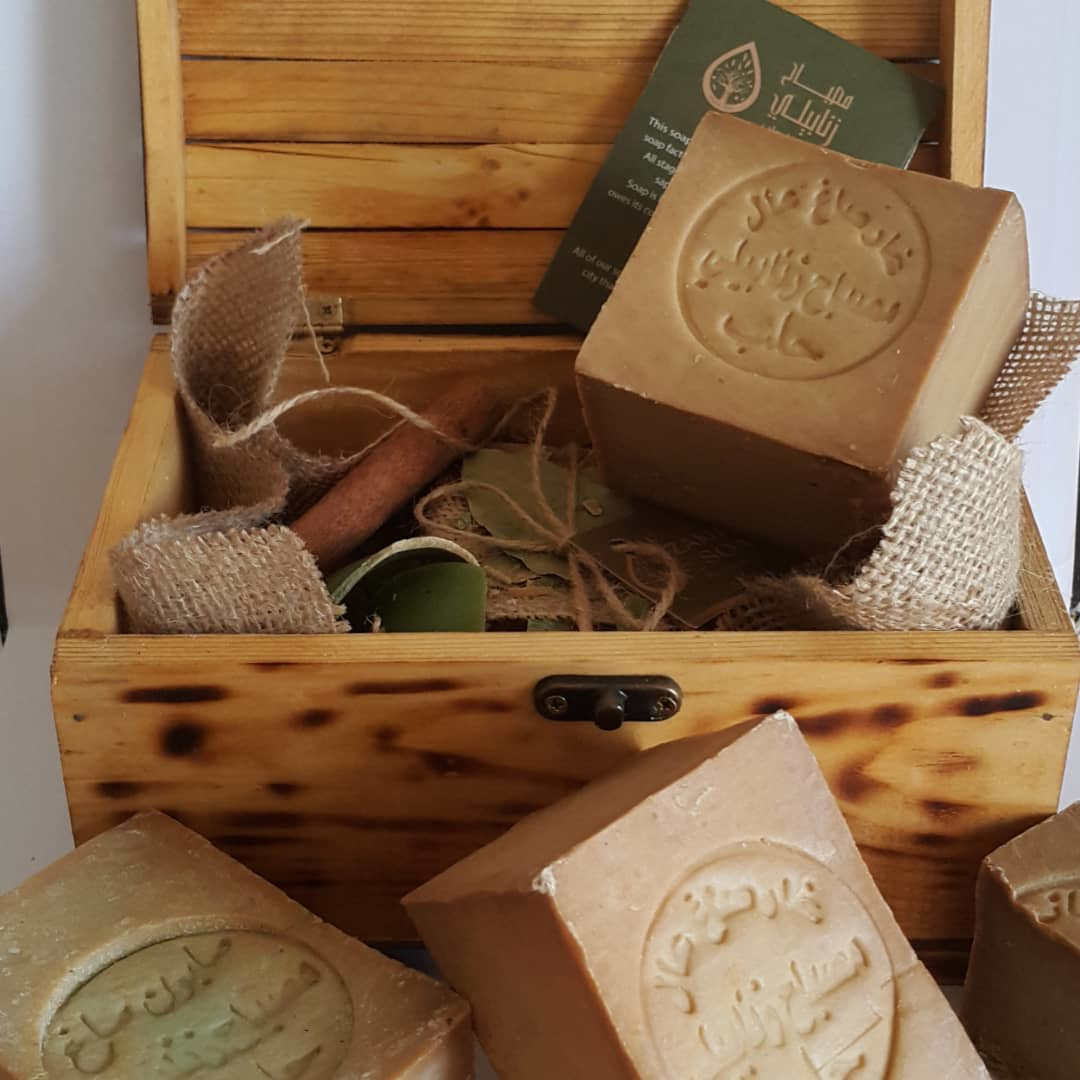
Dry Aleppo Soap

The soap is then cut into cubes of about 200g each. The cubes of soap are stacked in staggered cylinders to allow maximum air exposure. Once they have dried sufficiently, they are put into a special subterranean chamber to be aged for six months to a year. While it is aging, the soap goes through several chemical changes. The free alkaline content of the soap (the alkaline which did not react with the oil during saponification) breaks down upon slow reaction with air. The moisture content of the soap is also reduced, making the soap hard and long-lasting. And lastly, the color of the outside of the soap turns pale gold, while the inside remains green.

Modern Aleppo soaps are manufactured using a "cold process" and contain olive and laurel oils, and may contain a variety of herbs and/or essential oils.

== Ingredients ==
Aleppo soap is made with olive oil, the oil of the laurel berry (zeit ghar), water, and lye; the concentration of laurel oil, typically 2–60%, determines the quality and cost of the soap. Aleppo soap is biodegradable.

In the 20th century, with the introduction of cold process soap making, soap artisans from Aleppo began introducing a variety of herbs and essential oils to their soaps.

Unlike most soaps, some Aleppo soap will float in water.

== Skin care properties ==
Aleppo soap can be used daily as soap for washing and shampooing, as face mask, as shaving cream, and for bathing infants and babies. Laurel oil is an effective cleanser, with some antimicrobial, antifungal and anti-itching properties.

== See also ==
- Azul e branco soap
- Castile soap
- Marseille soap
- Nabulsi soap
- Vegan soap
- African black soap

== Bibliography ==
- Cynthia Zaferatos (2008). "The History Of Olive Oil" ( (PDF)). EUROMED Sustainable Connections Policy Analysis. Anna Lindh Foundation. p. 2. Archived from the original on 2012-04-07 – via Western Washington University.
- Nayak, Shivananda; Nalabothu, Poorna; Sandiford, Steve; Bhogadi, Vidyasagar; Adogwa, Andrew (2006). "Evaluation of wound healing activity of Allamanda cathartica. L. And Laurus nobilis. L. Extracts on rats". BMC Complementary and Alternative Medicine. 6: 12. doi:10.1186/1472-6882-6-12. PMC 1456996. PMID 16597335.
