= African black soap =

Kind of soap originating among the Yoruba people

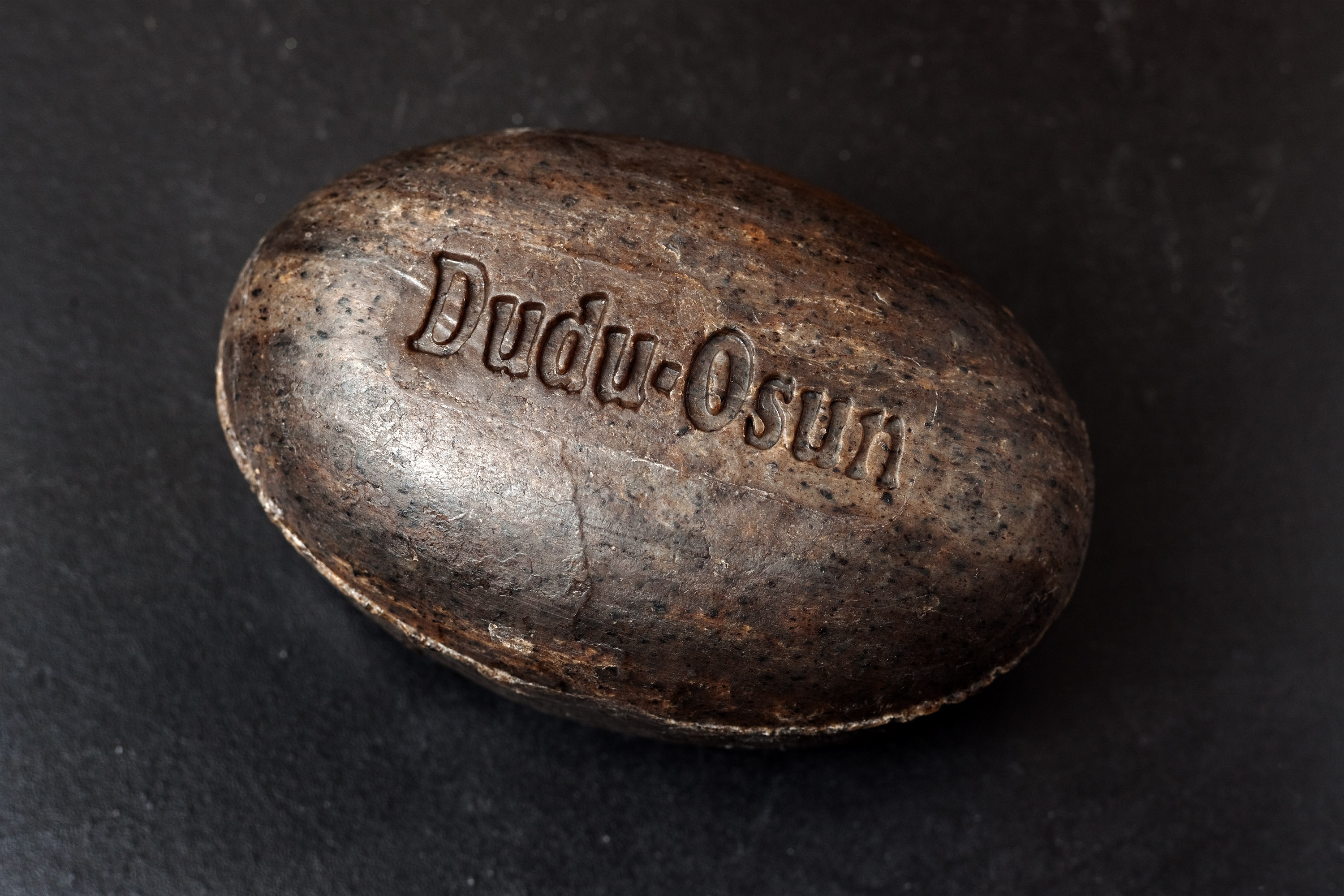
Dudu-Osun, a brand of African black soap, made by the Yoruba people of Nigeria

African black soap, or simply black soap (also known by various local names such as ọṣe dúdú, sabulun salo, and ncha nkota), is a kind of soap originating in Nigeria, invented by the Yoruba people. It is made from the ash of locally harvested African plants and dried peels, which gives the soap its characteristic dark colour, as well as oils derived from plant sources. Black soap has become a popular toiletry product in North America. In Nigeria, black soap is often made by women using traditional recipes and is often exported through fair trade groups.

Black soap has been found to have some antimicrobial properties against skin microbiota such as Staphylococcus aureus, Escherichia coli and Candida albicans.

== History ==
The origins of African black soap are traced to the Yoruba People of Nigeria. It is intertwined today with the cultural practices and natural resources of various West African ethnic groups. For instance, while some communities use shea butter, others incorporate palm oil into their soap-making processes. However, the use of shea butter in African black soap production dates back to the 14th century. Despite the name, African black soaps are rarely black with some of the highest-quality ones ranging from beige to dark brown. The earliest detailed account of African black soap appears in Awnsham Churchill's "A Collection of Voyages and Travels...," where it is noted that in the Senegambia region the Portuguese valued the soap, likely for its effectiveness. However, they refrained from introducing the soap to Portugal to avoid disrupting their local soap-making industry.

Additionally, Dutch merchant and diplomat David van Nyendael provided accounts of soap-making on the Gold Coast (modern-day Ghana), where locals used palm oil, banana leaves, and wood ash. Nyendael noted that the soap-making techniques in the Gold Coast were very similar and differed little from the soap-making of the people of Benin in Nigeria, which according to James Welsh (an English explorer) had a fragrance of violet. Oral history in Ghana points out that they were taught this soap making by the Yoruba people. Today the soap is called Alata Semina in Ghana, which refers to Pepper Sellers soap, due to the peppers the Yoruba traders who taught them sold. It is also called Anago Semina, Anago being a Yoruba subgroup and another name for Yorubas.

== Production and brand varieties ==
Plant matter, such as plantain skins, palm tree leaves, cocoa pods and shea tree bark, is first sun-dried and then burned to produce ash (which supplies the alkali required to convert or saponify the oils and fats). Next, water and various oils and fats, such as coconut oil, palm oil, and shea butter, are added to the ash. The mixture is cooked and hand-stirred for at least 24 hours. After the soap solidifies, it is scooped out and set out to cure.

A type of black soap known as ose-dudu originated with the Yoruba people of Nigeria. A combination of ose-dudu with leaves of the tropical camwood tree (Pterocarpus osun) produces a popular kind of soap with exfoliating properties called Dudu-Osun. Other traditional Nigerian names for black soap include sabulun salo and ncha nkota.

== See also ==
- Algerian soap
- Moroccan black soap

== Sources ==
- Aguh, Crystal; Okoye, Ginette A., eds. (2017). Fundamentals of Ethnic Hair. doi:10.1007/978-3-319-45695-9. ISBN 978-3-319-45694-2.
