= Algerian soap =

Artisanal soap used in hammam rituals

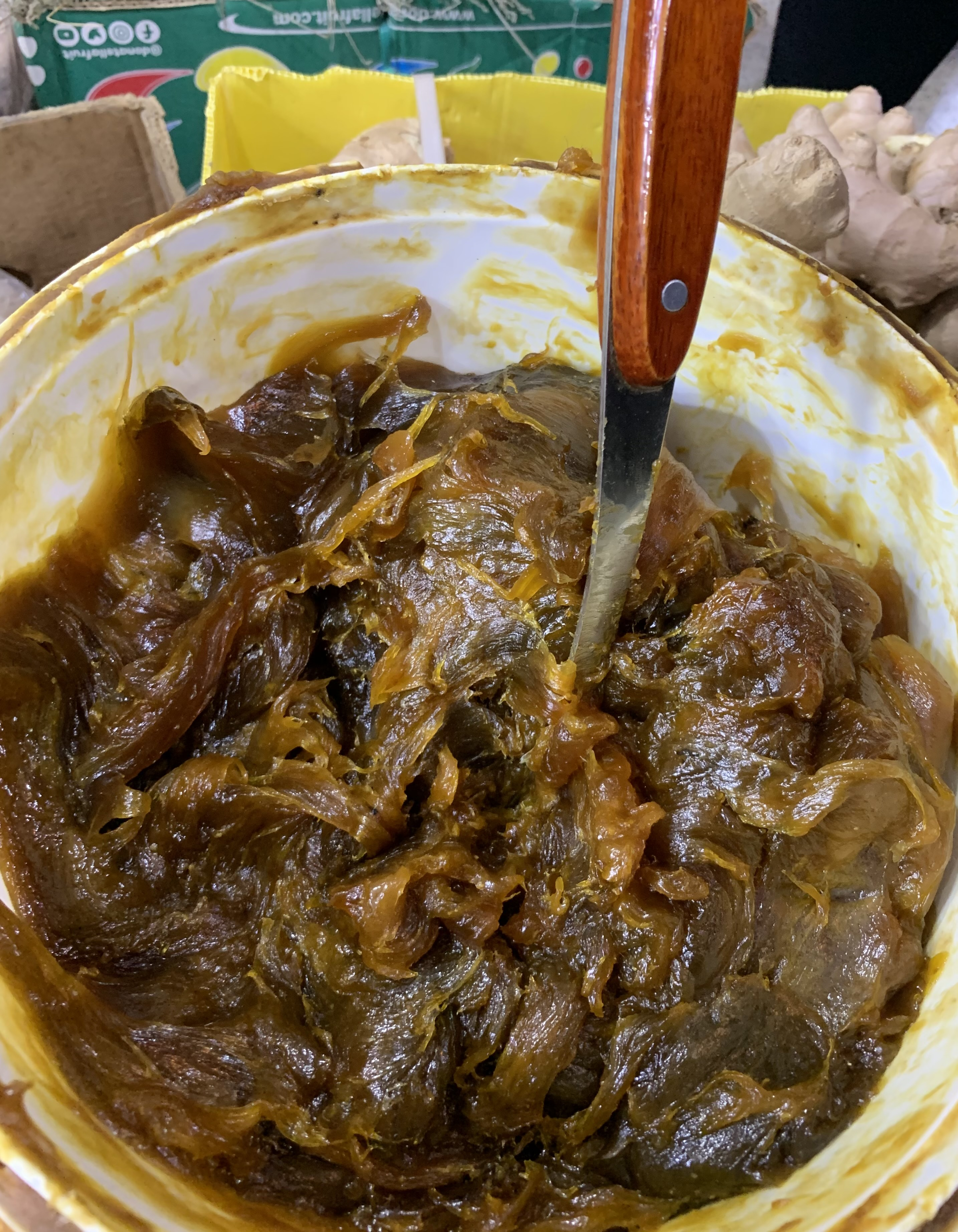
- Algerian soap sold by weight in a traditional market in Cheraga, Algiers.
- Alternative names: Saboun dzair, Algerian black soap, Algerian brown soap, Algerian liquid soap
- Place of origin: Algeria

Algerian soap, locally known as Saboun dzair (Arabic: صابون الدزاير) which translates to "Soap of Algeria", is an artisanal soap made using ingredients such as olive oil, fatty acids, and potassium. Algerians have been crafting this soap through generations-old, natural artisanal techniques. This often involves natural, artisanal processes that do not rely on modern industrial methods.

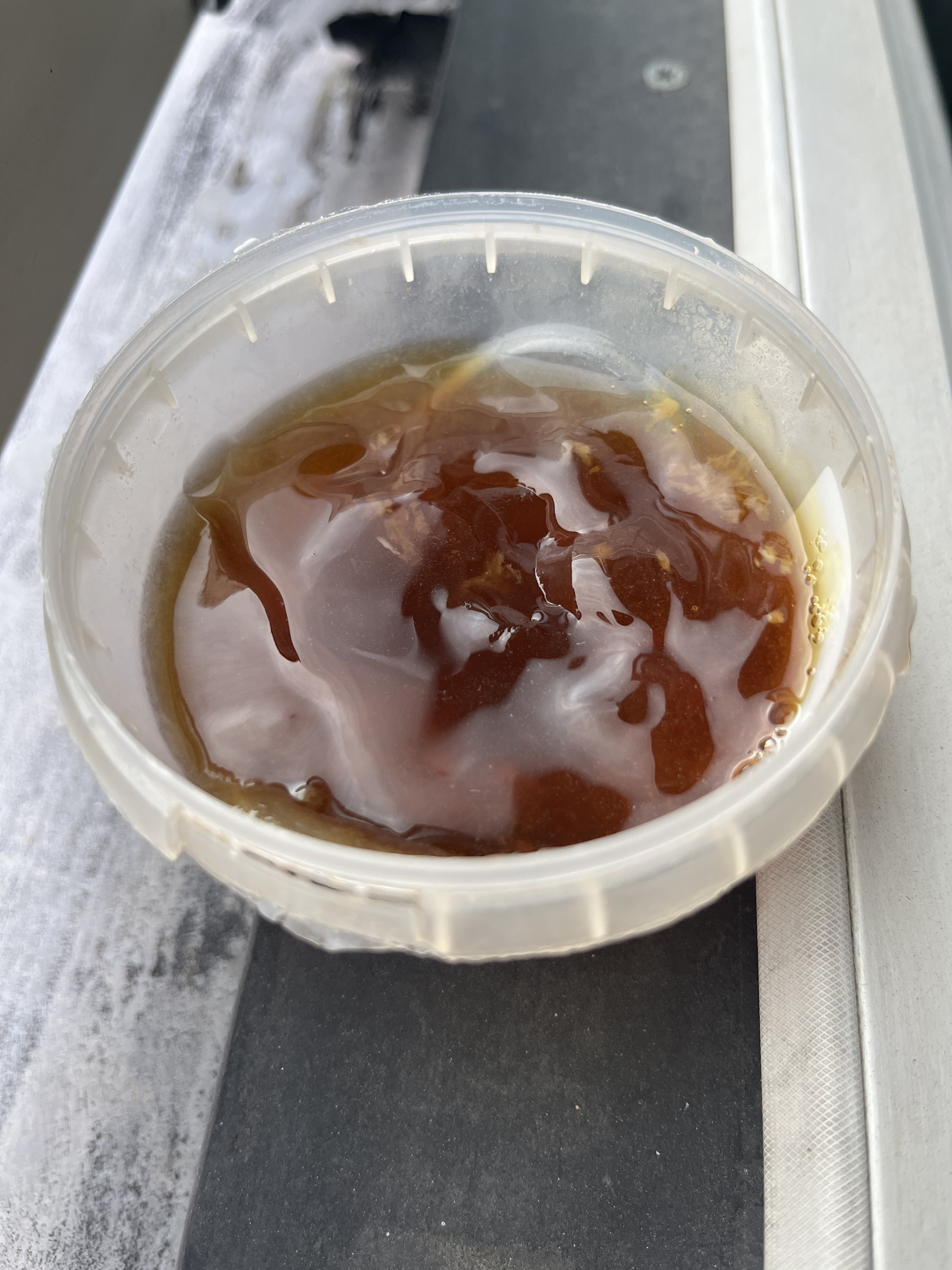
Packaged Algerian soap

Algerian soap typically comes in shades of brown, sometimes black, and occasionally yellow, depending on its composition and manufacturing method. It is characterized by its viscosity and semi-liquid state, sold by weight, and displayed in large barrels in herb and natural product stores.

== Cultural significance ==
One of the traditional uses of Algerian soap is in the hammam, where women incorporate it into their beauty routines. They apply the soap all over the body, leave it on for a few minutes, then wash it off using an exfoliating glove locally known as "Kessa". This process helps remove dead skin cells, leaving the skin clean and rejuvenated. The soap's natural properties make it a staple in maintaining the beauty and hygiene practices of Algerian women.

Algerian soap has been used for a very long time, even for men in hammams. In 1882, Maurice Taconet recounts in Souvenirs d'Algérie while visiting an Algerian hammam for men:

"Two Mozabites take each young man between their legs, cover him with black soap, rinse him, scrub him, twist him, dislocate him, crack his bones, stretch his limbs, which they turn, twist, bend, and fold in all directions, accompanied by increasingly funereal songs. After that, they pass them under another water faucet that rinses off the black soap, and other attendants come who wrap them in soft, fine cloths and fashion a very artistic turban for them."

In "The scientific exploration of Algeria" released in 1844, the authors detailed the cultural and economic importance of soap production among certain tribes in Algeria during the early 1840s. The saponification of oils not only served local needs but also facilitated significant exports from these communities. Among the prominent tribes involved in soap manufacturing were the Ait Waghlis, the Fenaïa, and the Beni Abbès, each contributing significantly to this industry.

Key manufacturing locations included Tifra, Tîbân, Temezgoug, Zerarka, Tir ilt Imalïoun, and Ait Alloun for the Beni Ourlis; Tir ilt oun and Gradj for the Fenaïa; and numerous villages across Beni Abbès territory, where soap production was widespread and integral to daily life. The abundance of locally sourced raw materials, such as olive oil extracted from community presses and soda derived from myrtle ashes found in the region's low-lying areas, underscored the self-sufficiency of these soap-making traditions. The practice extended beyond economic necessity, influencing local hygiene customs. It was noted that affluent individuals often observed rigorous hand-washing rituals with soap after meals, reflecting the ingrained cleanliness habits fostered by soap production within these tribes.

The economic dynamics were also significant, with soap prices and production methods varying across different tribal markets. For instance, the Fenaïa were known to incorporate lime into their soap preparation, affecting both the cost and quality of their products. In the Fenaïa market, a pound of soap weighing sixteen ounces was priced at 25 centimes, highlighting the accessibility and local affordability of this essential commodity.
