= Project Hope (Palestine) =

UK-based non-governmental organisation

Project Hope Palestine (Humanitarian Opportunities for Peace and Education) is a Canadian registered non-governmental organisation providing free educational and recreational programmes for children in and around the city of Nablus, in the northern part of the State of Palestine, some 63km north of Jerusalem. It is thought to be the largest organisation of its kind in the West Bank.

== History ==
Project Hope was established in 2003 at the height of the Second Palestinian Intifada. It was co-founded by three Nablus-born locals, Hakim Sabbah, Salem Hantoli and Samah Atout, together with Canadian Jeremy Wildeman who, while volunteering in West Bank education in 2002 was caught up in the violence. He returned to Nablus in 2003 to help address the humanitarian crisis in his own way, by addressing the severe educational and opportunity deficiencies youth faced there. Wildeman later told the Toronto Star he returned with nothing more than an idea, and a group of volunteers. His idea was to provide educational opportunities to children who, because of the humanitarian crisis caused by the conflict, were being denied their basic rights under the United Nations Convention on the Rights of the Child 1989 to 'learn, thrive and grow' in a safe and supportive environment. He teamed up with three Nablus residents to fulfil this aim. Samah Atout spent her formative years as a university student enduring the horrors of the Second Intifada, and wanted to do something for her community - led by the community rather than by donors with often conflicting political agendas. According to Project Hope's mission statement their aim is to support and empower Palestinian youth through learning, the same principle that guides the work today.

== Volunteers ==
In 2013 Project Hope hosted 144 international volunteers from 19 countries, the majority from the United States, France and Britain. This represents a 57% increase over 2011. Volunteers are required to contribute to the cost of shared accommodation in houses belonging to the charity. All volunteers undergo induction before teaching or setting up workshops and summer camps. Local volunteers are key to supporting overseas teams in the classroom and other activities.

== Programmes ==
The charity, led by Director Hakim Sabbah, is said to be the largest non-governmental organisation of its kind in the West Bank. It employs locally engaged staff to manage and administer the programmes. Depending on demand, classes and workshops typically focus on languages (English and French), information technology and the arts, including music, drama and photography. They take place in community settings in partnership with schools, community centres and village halls. In 2013 there were 69 such local partners.

== Funding ==
Project Hope is funded by overseas grants and donations.
