= Pesta Perdana =

Pesta Perdana (Prime Fest) is a Singaporean awards show held by Mediacorp, honouring "the best in the Malay television industry". It is touted as "Singapore's Malay version of the Emmys" and Star Awards. Airing on Mediacorp Suria, as of 2011, it is held two times in a year.

First held in 1997 as an awards show for both Malay and Tamil programmes on Prime 12, it became a Malay-language only event in 1998. Its Tamil counterpart, Pradana Vizha, started in 1999.
