= Castile soap =

Type of olive oil–based soap

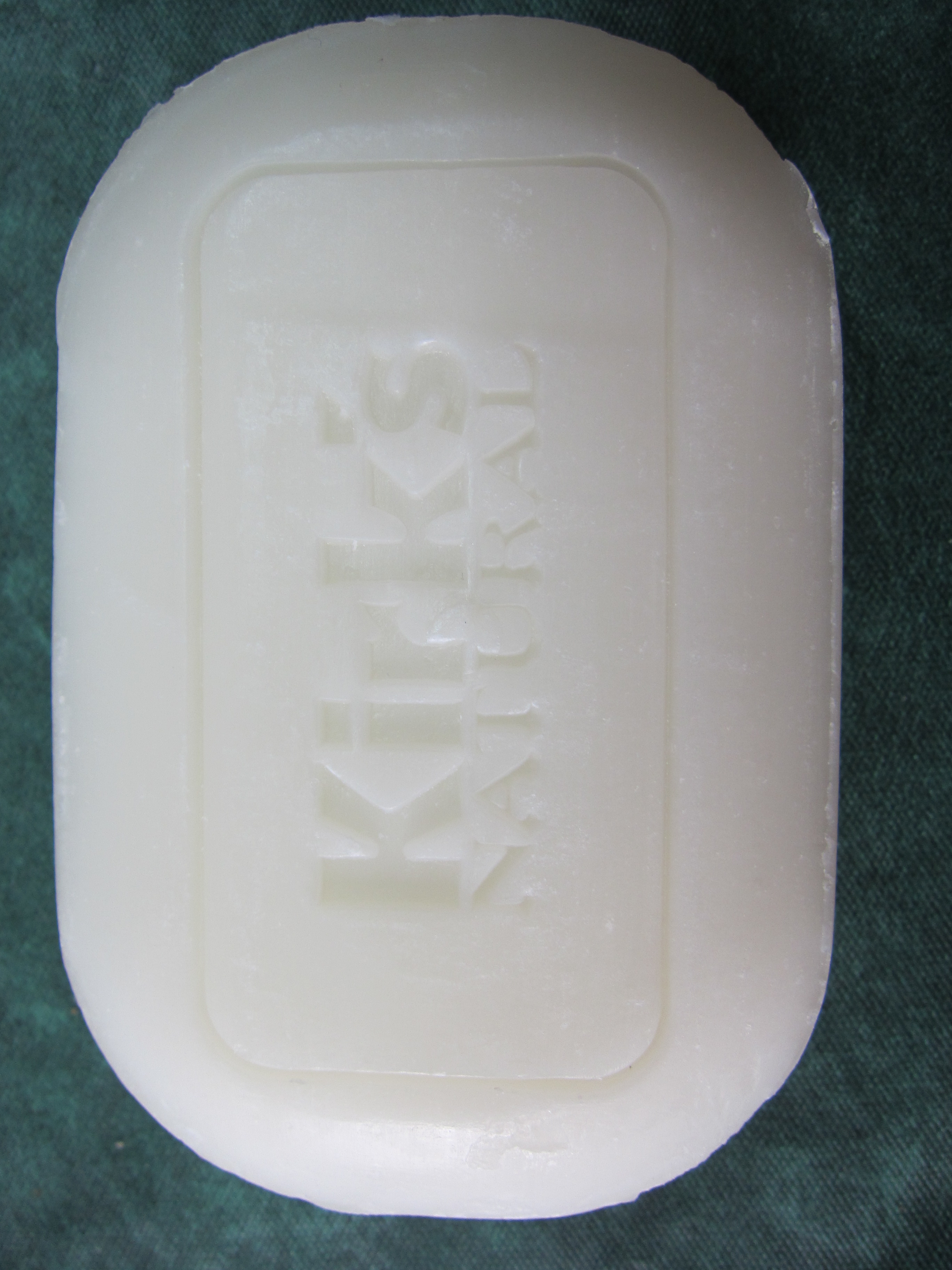
A bar of Castile soap

Castile soap is an olive oil–based soap made in a style similar to that originating in the Castile region of Spain.

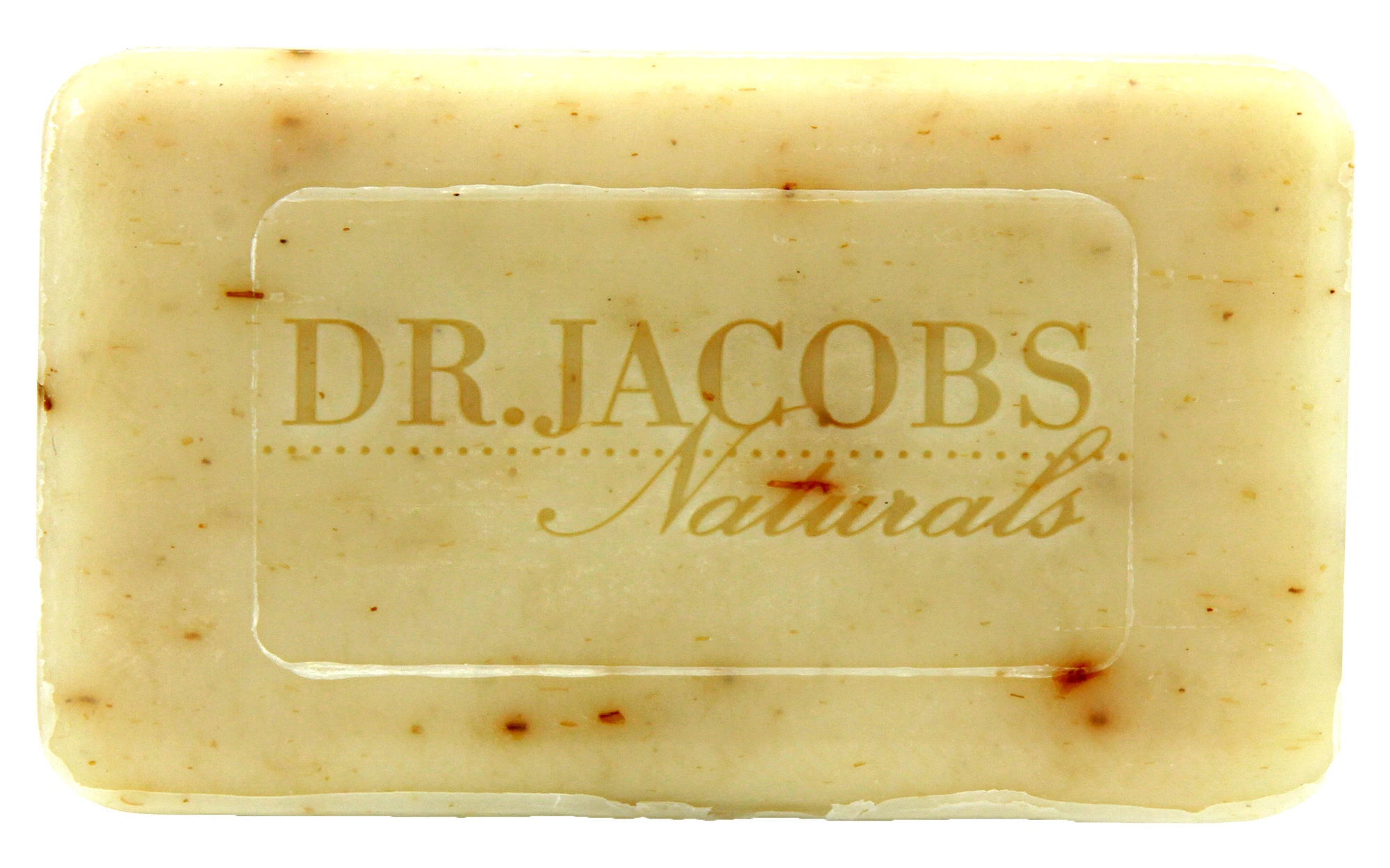

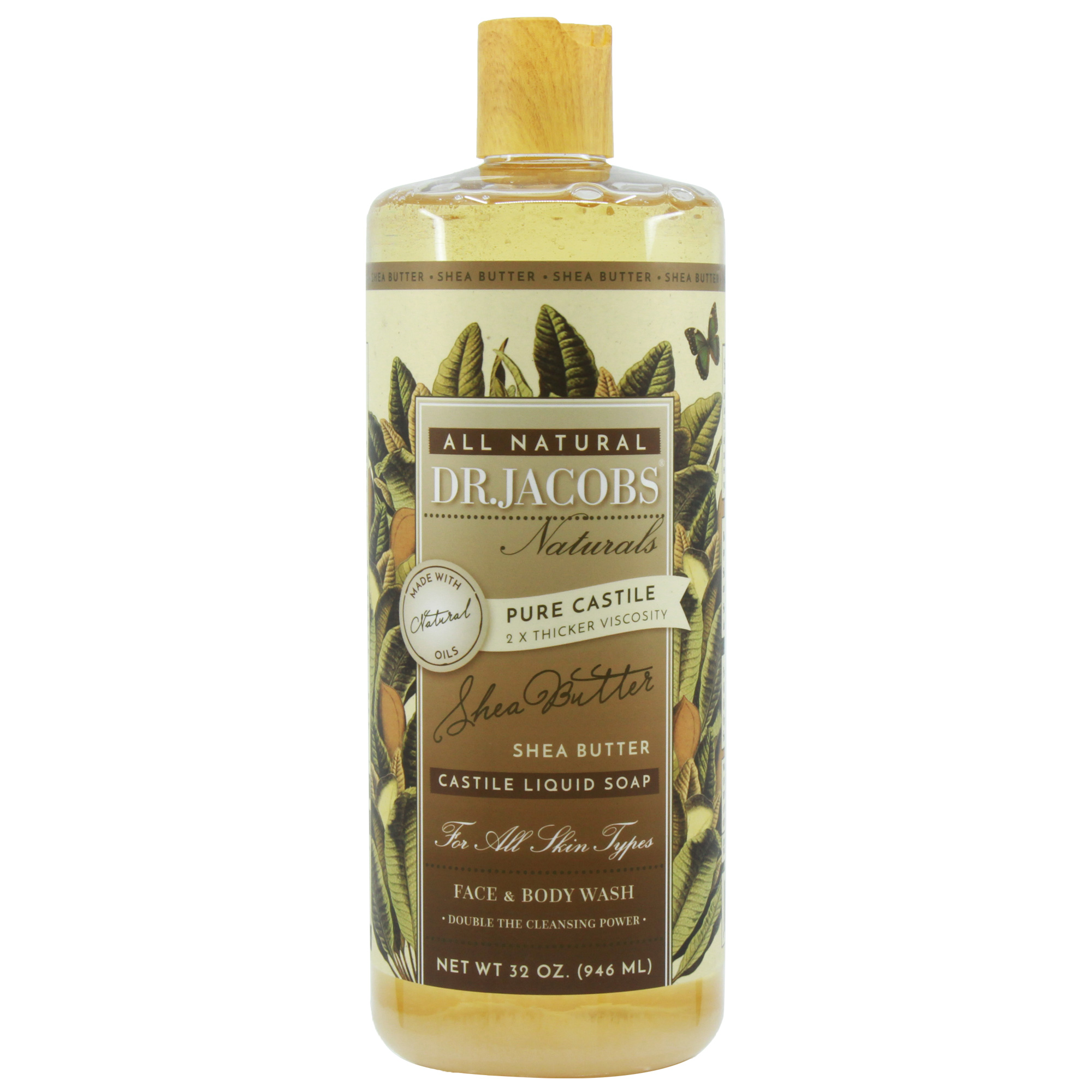
Liquid Castile soap

== History ==
The start of Castile soap goes back to the Levant, where Aleppo soapmakers have made hard soaps based on olive and laurel oil for millennia.

It is commonly believed that the Crusaders brought Aleppo soap back to Europe in the 11th century, based on the claim that the earliest soap made in Europe was just after the Crusades. Following the Crusades, production of this soap extended to the whole Mediterranean area.

Early soapmakers in the Mediterranean area did not have easy access to laurel oil and therefore dropped it from their formulations, thereby creating an olive oil-based soap now known as Castile soap. Castile soap is so called because it was produced on a large scale in the territories of the Crown of Castile, from where it was exported to numerous places in Europe, mainly during the modern era. Although the Crown of Castile was not the only producer of this type of soap, it was its producer par excellence.

In the 17th century, the soap caused controversy in England, since it supplanted the unnamed local soap after the Spanish Catholic manufacturers purchased the monopoly on the soap from the cash-strapped Carolinian government. Its ties to Catholicism caused a public-relations campaign to be established, featuring washerwomen showing how much more effective local soaps were than Castile soap. The sale of a monopoly in Protestant England to a Catholic company caused a great uproar, ending with the Castile soap company eventually being stripped of the monopoly.

Importations of "Castile soap" through Antwerp appear in the London port books of 1567–1568. Though the Oxford English Dictionary has no references to "Castile soap" earlier than 1631, it is also mentioned in the English poem Libelle of Englyshe Polycye dating from 1436 or 1437. In his article "A short history of soap", John Hunt maintains that barilla (an impure form of sodium carbonate obtained from halophyte plant ashes that were high in sodium) was boiled with locally available olive oil, rather than tallow.

Adding brine to the boiled liquor made the soap float to the surface, where the soap-boiler could skim it off, leaving the excess lye and impurities to settle out. While Aleppo soap tends to be green, this produced what was probably the first white hard soap, which hardened further as it aged, without losing its whiteness, forming jabón de Castilla.

Apothecaries knew the product by the Latin names of sapo hispaniensis (Spanish soap) or sapo castilliensis (Castilian soap).

== See also ==
- Popish soap, a derogatory name for the 17th-century soap monopoly in England
