= Khadra (disambiguation) =

Khadra is a town and commune in Mostaganem Province, Algeria. It may also refer to:

- Khadra (name), list of people with the name
- Khadra Palace, residence of the Umayyad caliphs in Damascus
- Khadra and the Southern Sinbad, 1952 Egyptian comedy film
- Al Khadra, multiple settlements in Libya and Saudi Arabia
- Al-Khadra Mosque, place of prayer for Muslims in Nablus, Palestine
- Bab el Khadra, gate in Tunis, Tunisia
- Borj el-Khadra, settlement in Tunisia
