= Old City of Nablus =

Old city in the West Bank, Palestine

Old City of Nablus البلدة القديمة في نابلس
- Old city
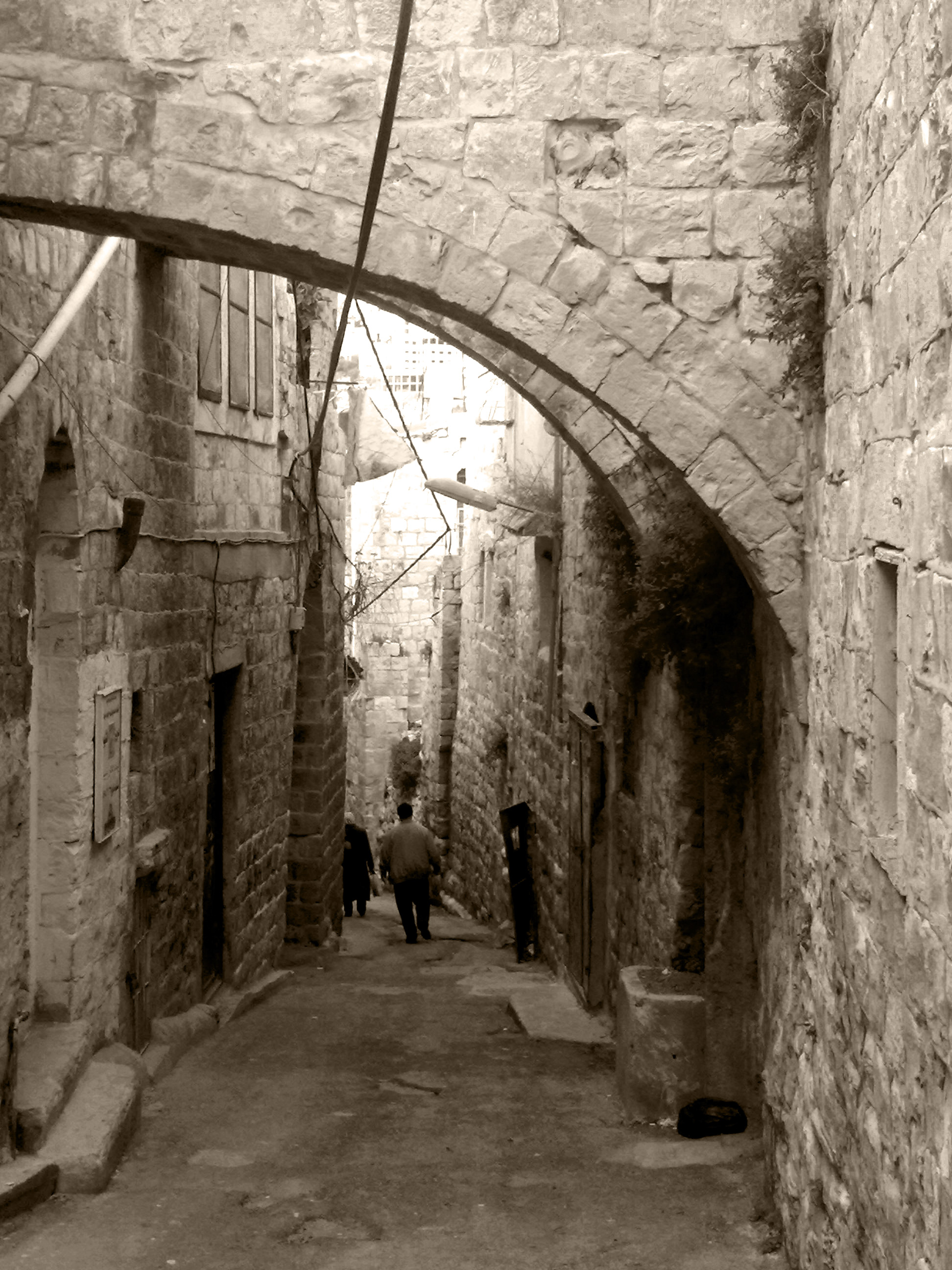
- Streets of the Old City

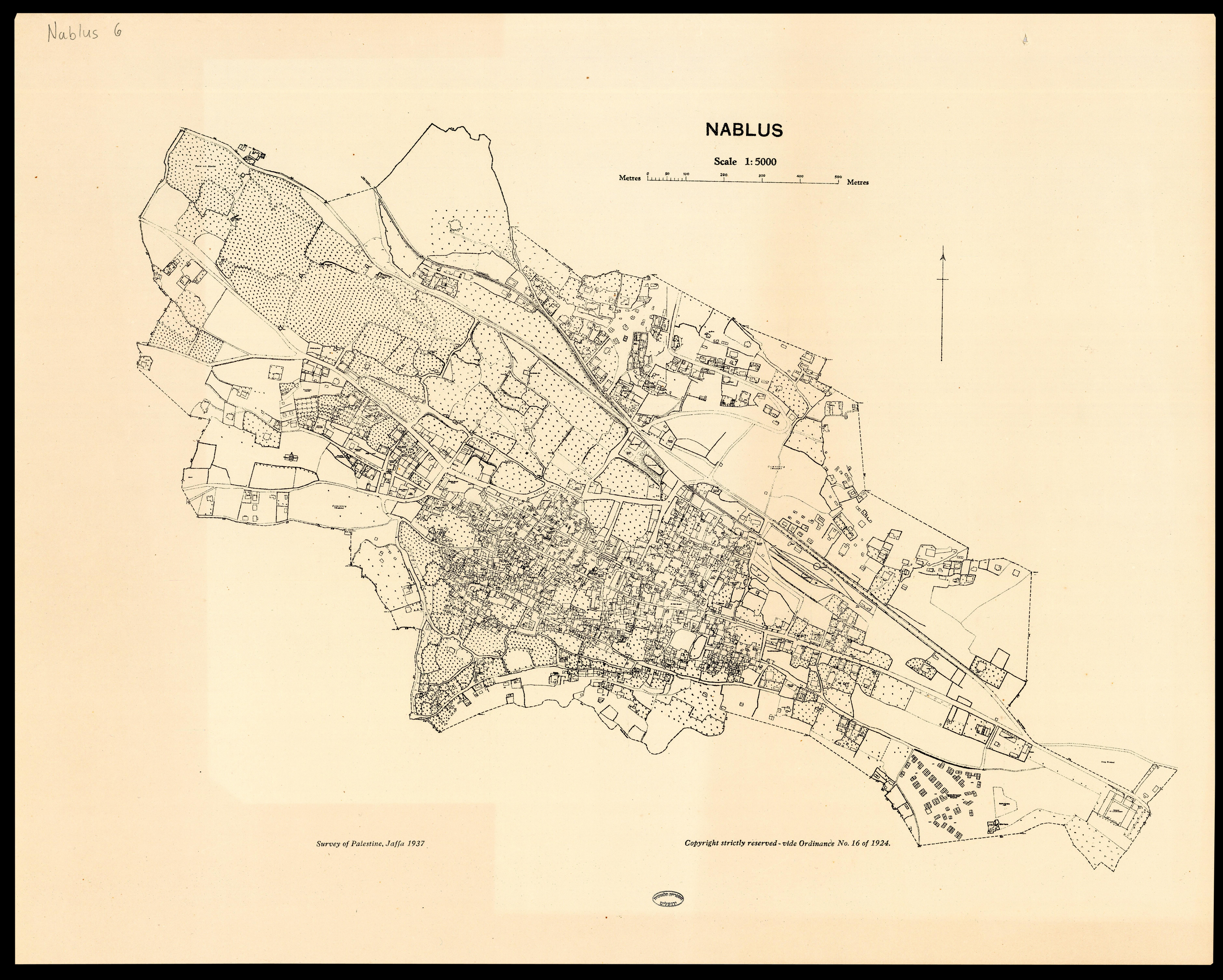
- 1937 Survey of Palestine map
- Coordinates: 32°13′8″N 35°15′41″E
- Country: Palestine
- City: Nablus
- Established: 72 CE

The Old City of Nablus (Arabic: البلدة القديمة في نابلس, romanized: al-Baldah al-Qadīmah fī Nābulus) is the historical center of Nablus, in the northern West Bank. Known for its cultural, architectural, and social heritage, the Old City was founded as a Roman city, and remained an important urban center ever since. The Old City of Nablus was a center of commerce, with large souqs selling textiles, spices and Nabulsi soap. Today it includes more than 100 historical monumental buildings. The Old City has been repeatedly damaged by Israeli rockets and bombs, particularly during the Second Intifada, where it suffered "probably more than any other Palestinian city".

== History ==
Located in the strategic valley between Mount Ebal and Mount Gerizim, a Canaanite city was first founded at Tell Balata around 2000 BCE; it is thought to have become the important Biblical city of Shechem. Nablus was subsequently founded during the Roman period when Emperor Vespasian established the city of Flavia Neapolis in 72 CE, 2 kilometers (1.2 mi) west of the ruins of Shechem. Holy places near the city include Joseph's Tomb and Jacob's Well. Because of its strategic geographic position on key trade routes and the abundance of water from nearby springs, Neapolis evolved into a prominent cultural, religious, and commercial center.

The early city was built on a Roman grid plan, and had a grand theater that could seat up to 7,000 people. Early christian Justin Martyr was born in the city c. 100 CE, and a bishop from Nablus participated in the Council of Nicaea in 325 CE. Almost a century of conflict between the city's Samaritan and newer Christian inhabitants, known as the Samaritan revolts, took place during the Byzantine period, and were eventually suppressed by the Byzantines by 573. Neapolis was conquered by the Muslims under Khalid ibn al-Walid in 636 after the Battle of Yarmouk. The town prevailed as an important trade center during the centuries of Islamic Arab rule under the Umayyad, Abbasid and Fatimid dynasties. In the 10th century, the Arab geographer al-Muqaddasi, described it as abundant of olive trees, with a large marketplace, a finely paved Great Mosque, houses built of stone, a stream running through the center of the city, and notable mills. He also noted that it was nicknamed "Little Damascus." At the time, the linen produced in Nablus was well known throughout the Old World.

The city was captured by Crusaders in 1099, under the command of Prince Tancred, and renamed Naples. In 1120, the Crusaders convened the Council of Nablus out of which was issued the first written laws for the kingdom. They converted the Samaritan synagogue in Nablus into a church. Queen Melisende of Jerusalem resided in Nablus from 1150 to 1161, after she was granted control over the city in order to resolve a dispute with her son Baldwin III. Crusaders began building Christian institutions in Nablus, including a church dedicated to the Passion and Resurrection of Jesus, and in 1170 they erected a hospice for pilgrims. Crusader rule came to an end in 1187, when the Ayyubids led by Saladin captured the city. The Great Mosque of Nablus, which had become a church under Crusader rule, was restored as a mosque by the Ayyubids, who also built a mausoleum in the old city. The city was severely damaged 15 years later by the 1202 Syria earthquake. In 1244, the Samaritan synagogue, built in 362 by the high priest Akbon and converted into a church by the Crusaders, was converted into al-Khadra Mosque. Two other Crusader churches became the An-Nasr Mosque and al-Masakim Mosque during that century. The Mamluk dynasty gained control of Nablus in 1260 and during their reign, they built numerous mosques and schools. Under Mamluk rule, Nablus possessed running water, many hammams and exported olive oil and soap to Egypt, Syria, the Hejaz, several Mediterranean islands, and the Arabian Desert.

Under the Ottoman Turks, who conquered the city in 1517, Nablus served as the administrative and commercial centre for the Nablus Sanjak, roughly corresponding to the modern-day northern West Bank. During the 16th century, the population was predominantly Muslim. In 1771, during the Egyptian Mamluk invasion of Syria, Daher al-Umar, the autonomous Arab ruler of the Galilee, aligned himself with the Mamluks and besieged Nablus, but did not succeed in taking the city. In 1773, he tried again without success. The sieges led to a decline in the importance of the city in favor of Acre. Daher's successor, Jezzar Pasha, maintained Acre's dominance over Nablus. After his reign ended in 1804, Nablus regained its autonomy, and the Tuqans, who represented a principal opposing force, rose to power.

In 1831–32 Khedivate Egypt, then led by Muhammad Ali, conquered Palestine from the Ottomans; the destruction of Acre and further increased the political importance of Nablus. Throughout the 18th and 19th centuries, Nablus was the principal trade and manufacturing center in Ottoman Syria. Its economic activity and regional leadership position surpassed that of Jerusalem and the coastal cities of Jaffa and Acre. Olive oil was the primary product of Nablus and aided other related industries such as soap-making and basket weaving. It was also the largest producer of cotton in the Levant, topping the production of northern cities such as Damascus. Between 19 September and 25 September 1918, in the last months of the Sinai and Palestine Campaign of the First World War the Battle of Nablus took place. The 1927 Jericho earthquake destroyed many of the Nablus' historic buildings, including the An-Nasr Mosque. Though they were subsequently rebuilt by Haj Amin al-Husayni's Supreme Muslim Council in the mid-1930s, their previous "picturesque" character was lost. During the 1936–1939 Arab revolt in Palestine, the British authorities demolished buildings in the Old City quarter of Qaryun suspected of harboring insurgents or hiding weapons.

In modern times, the city endured many Israeli military incursions, which significantly damaged parts of the Old City. It has been repeatedly damaged by Israeli rockets and bombs, particularly during the Second Intifada, where it suffered "probably more than any other Palestinian city".

== Architecture ==
The Old City is known for dense, labyrinthine streets, lined with traditional stone buildings, markets, mosques, and historic houses. The architecture is predominantly Mamluk and Ottoman, with some structures dating back to the Ayyubid and earlier periods.

== Notable landmarks ==
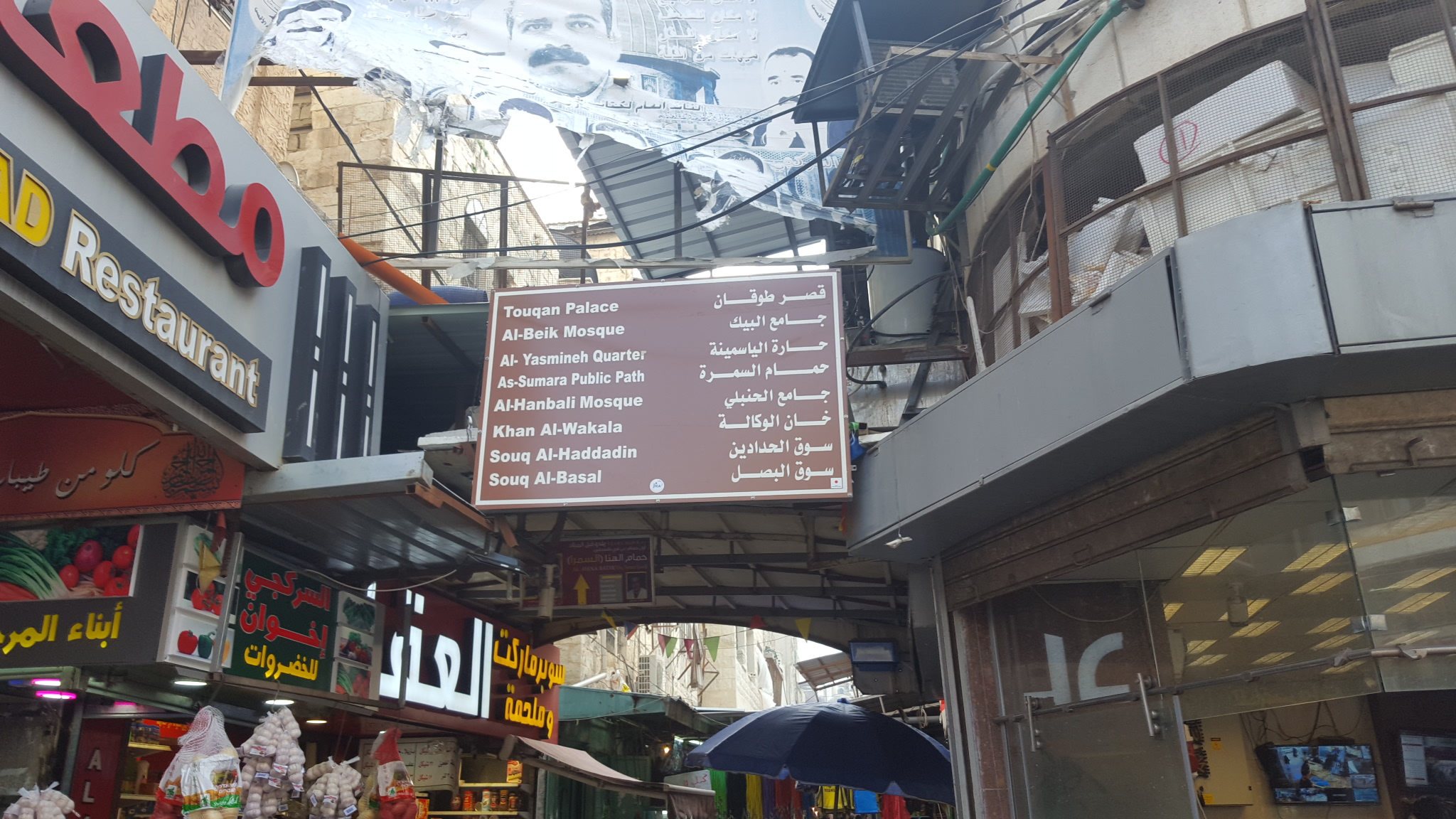
Tourist sign in the Old City

The Old City is home to several important landmarks, including:

- Mosques (9) Great Mosque of Nablus, An-Nasr Mosque, Hanbali Mosque, al-Khadra Mosque, Al-Saton, Al-Khader, Al-Bek, Al-Tina, Al-Anbiya'
- Zawiyas / small mosques (7) Al-Samdiya, Al-Bastamiya, Al-Omari, Al-Sa'diya, Al-Qadam Al-Rifa'iya, Al-Darwishiya, Al-Harithiya
- Maqams (shrines) (5) Al-Anbiya', Al-Sheikh Muslim, Al-Sheikh Badran, Al-Sheikh Masoud, Bish Al-Hafi
- Palaces (3) the large compounds of prominent historical families: Tuqan Palace, Al-Nimr Palace and Abd al-Hadi Palace
- Hammams (8) Al-Hana' (the last hamaam built in the city in the 19th century, closed in 1928 but restored and reopened in 1994), Al-Shifa (built by the Tuqans in 1624), Al-Baydara, Al-Daraja, Al-Reesh, Al-Qadi, Al-Tamimi, Al-Khalili
- Caravanserais / Khans (3) Khan al-Tujjar, Al-Jadeed, Al-Wikala (Wikalat Al-Froukhiya)
- Sabils (fountains) (10) Al-Taher, Al-Satoun, Al-Sukkar, Al-Khader, Al-Kas, Al-Qaryun, Al-Salaha Al-Ulwi, Al-Salaha Al-Sufli, Al-Sitt, Al-Dulab
- Soap factories (29) Al-Rantisi, Al-Masri, Al-Nabilsi, Tuqan, Arafat, Kanaan, Al-Nimer, Fatayer, Salhab, Al-Amad, Shahin, Al-Taher, Al-Tamimi, Abu-Alrus, Abu Al-Majed, Ya'eesh, Abdelhadi, Al-Satoun, Abu Al-Shamat, Al-Aloul
- Manara Clock Tower built in 1906

The city layout contains the remains of its of original Roman planning. It is composed of six major quarters, each divided by narrow encircling streets: Yasmina, Gharb, Qaryun, Aqaba, Qaysariyya, and Habala. Habala is the largest quarter, with relatively modern buildings, and its population growth led to the development of two smaller neighborhoods: al-Arda and Tal al-Kreim. Yasmina quarter is well known for its meandering, slanted, and dark alleys. Qaryun quarter contains many soap factories. Several leather tanneries, souks, pottery and textile workshops also line the Old City streets.

== Conservation and challenges ==
The Old City of Nablus, like many historic urban centers in Palestine, faces significant challenges, including physical deterioration of buildings, lack of infrastructure, and the effects of the Israeli occupation, which have led to damage from military incursions and restricted access. Efforts have been made to preserve its architectural heritage, such as the 1999-2003 Master Plan for the Preservation and further Development of the Historic Centre of Nablus, Palestine by the Institute of Urbanism at Graz University of Technology, instituted by the Nablus Municipality and funded by the Austrian Development Agency, and the subsequent restoration project led by the Welfare Association (Taawon). It was added to the UNESCO World Heritage Tentative List under the name "Old Town of Nablus and its environs"; in 2026 the city was re-added to the tentative list as "The Historic City of Nablus and its environs".

== Gallery ==
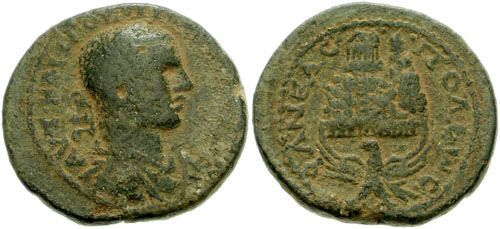
Coin minted in Nablus (Neapolis), in the name of Emperor Volusian, 251-253 CE

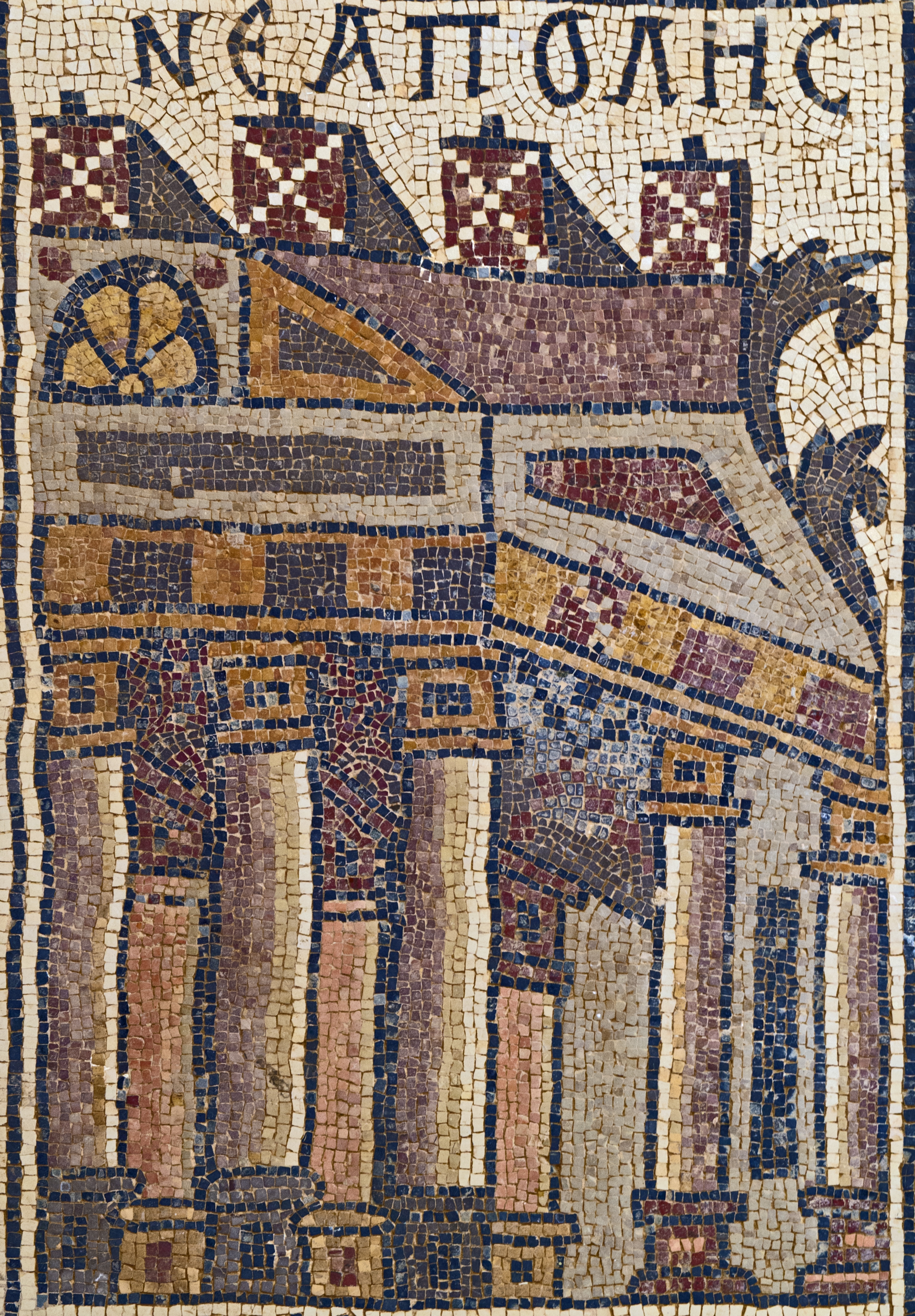
Depiction of Nablus (Neapolis) in the Umm ar-Rasas mosaics, 8th century CE

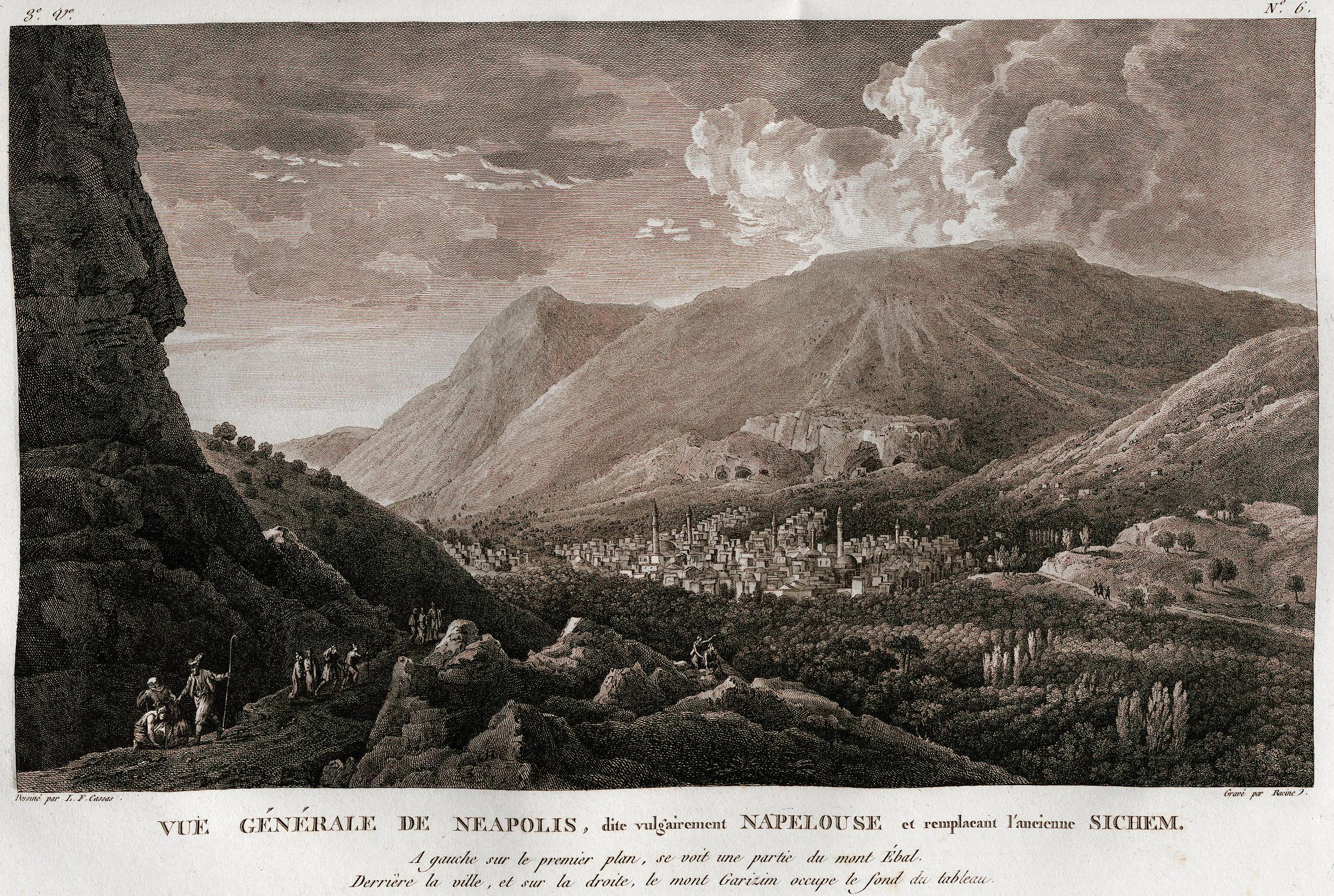
Nablus in the 1780s, by Louis-François Cassas

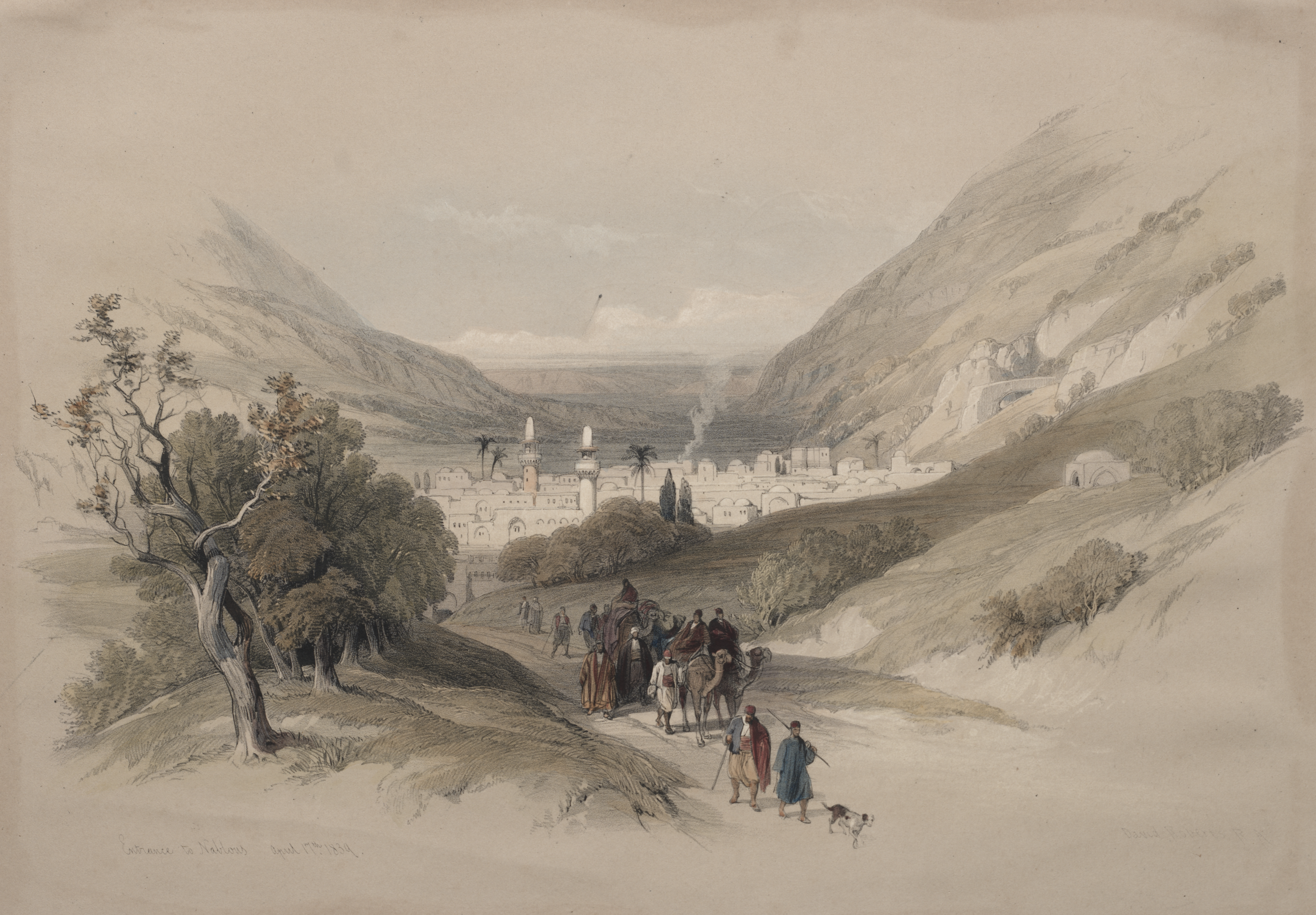
"Entrance to Nablous", from The Holy Land, Syria, Idumea, Arabia, Egypt, and Nubia

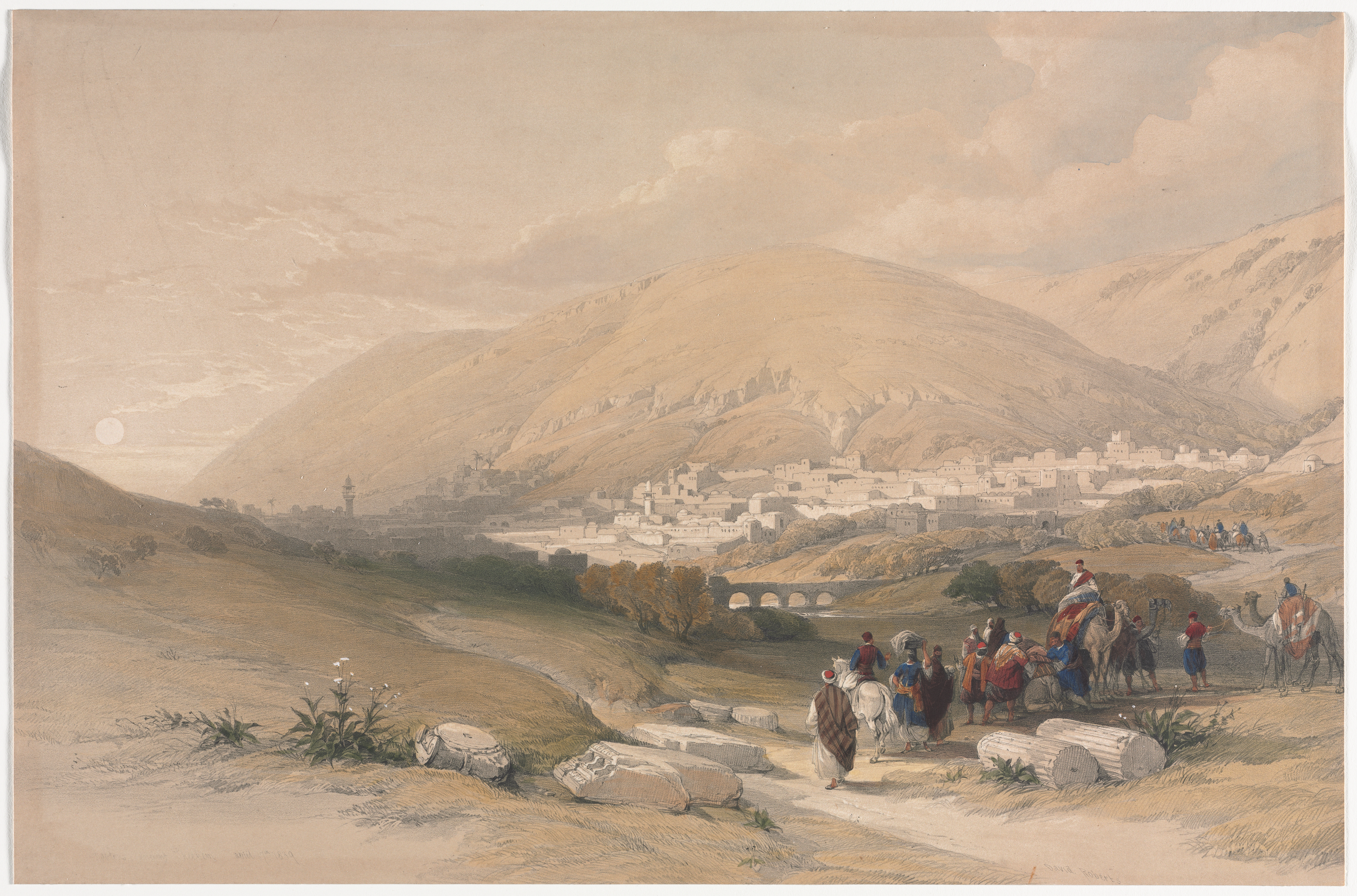
"Nablous, the ancient Shechem" from The Holy Land, Syria, Idumea, Arabia, Egypt, and Nubia

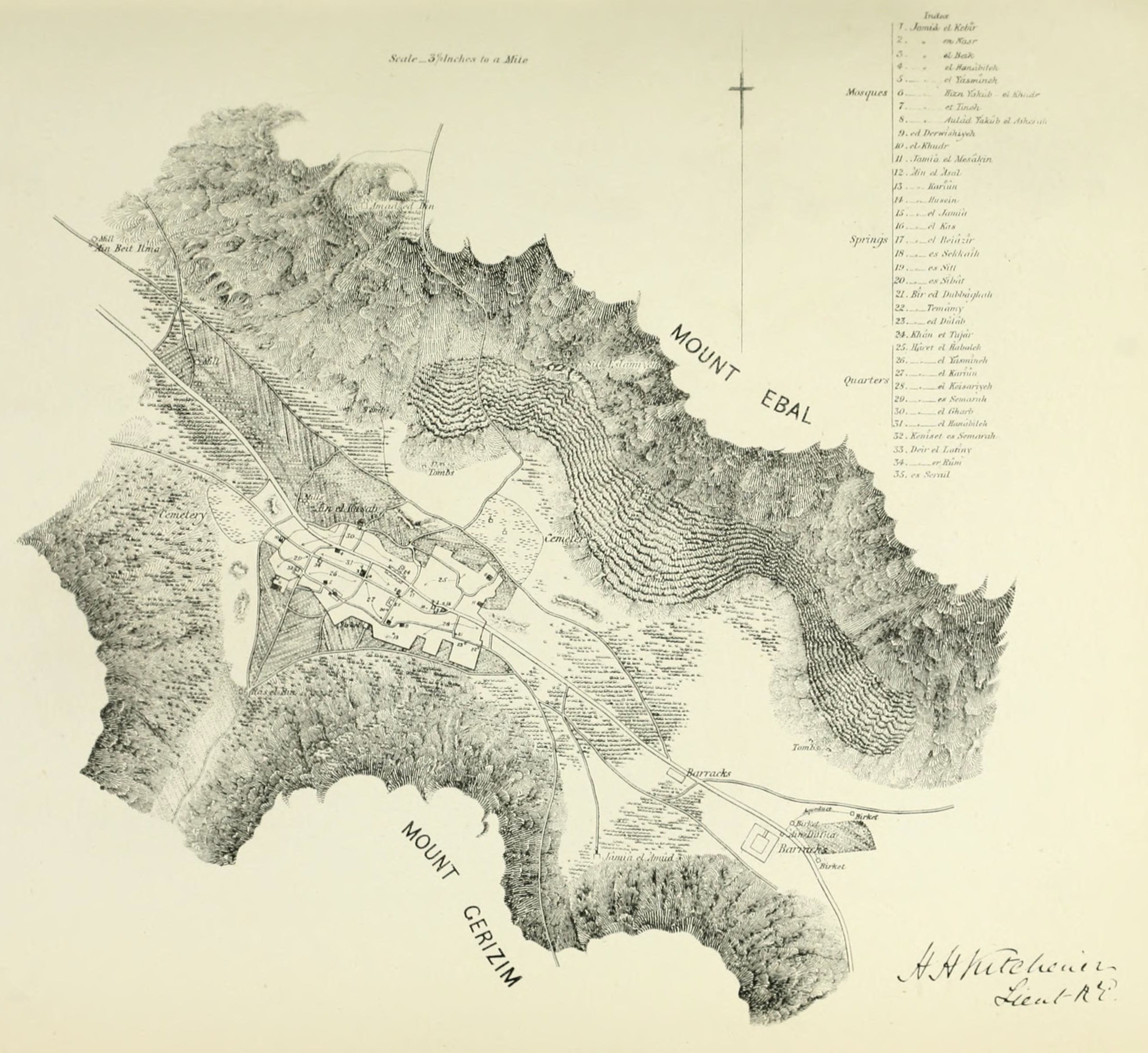
Nablus from the 1871–1877 PEF Survey of Palestine

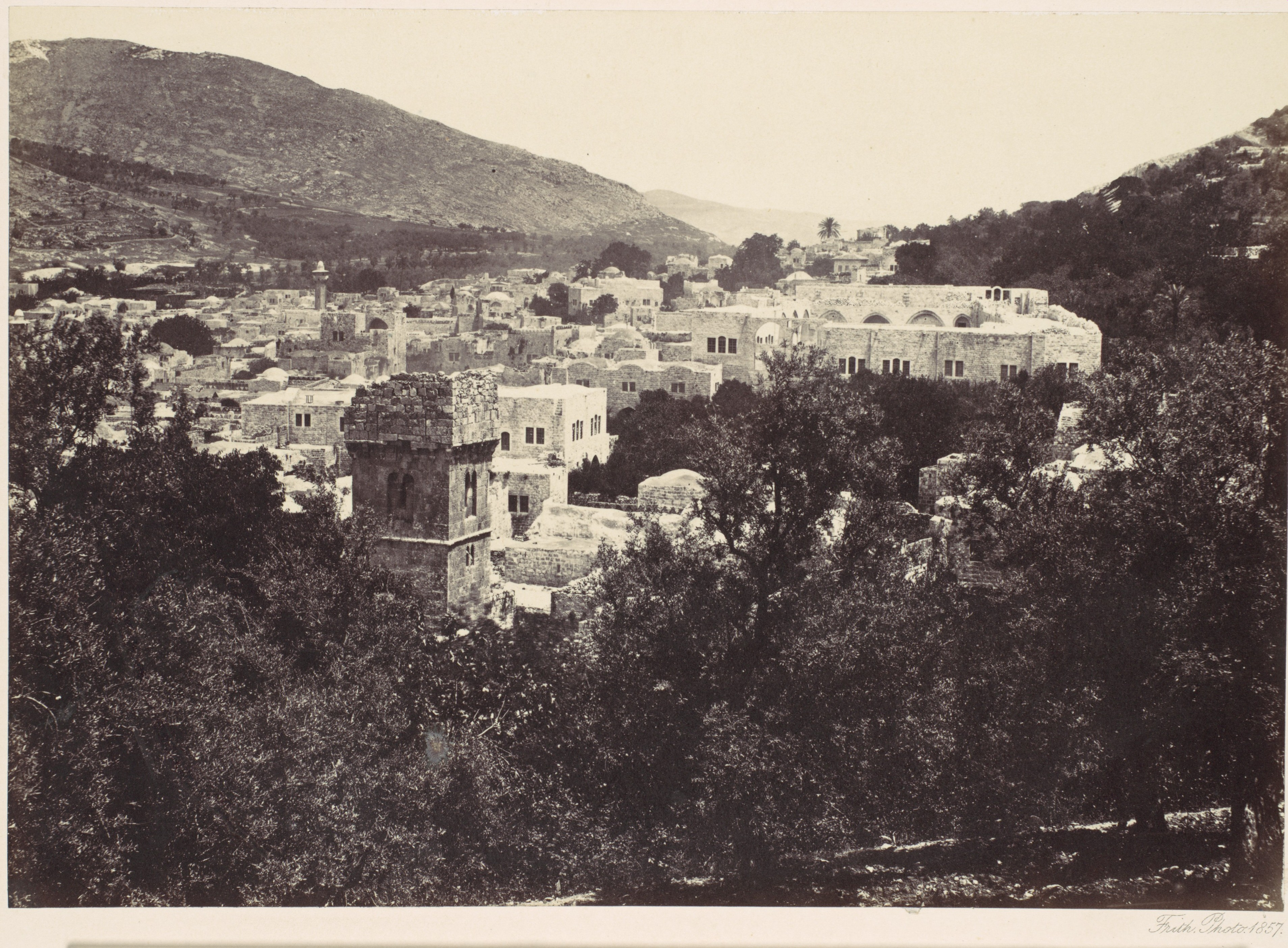
Nablus in 1857, photo by Francis Frith

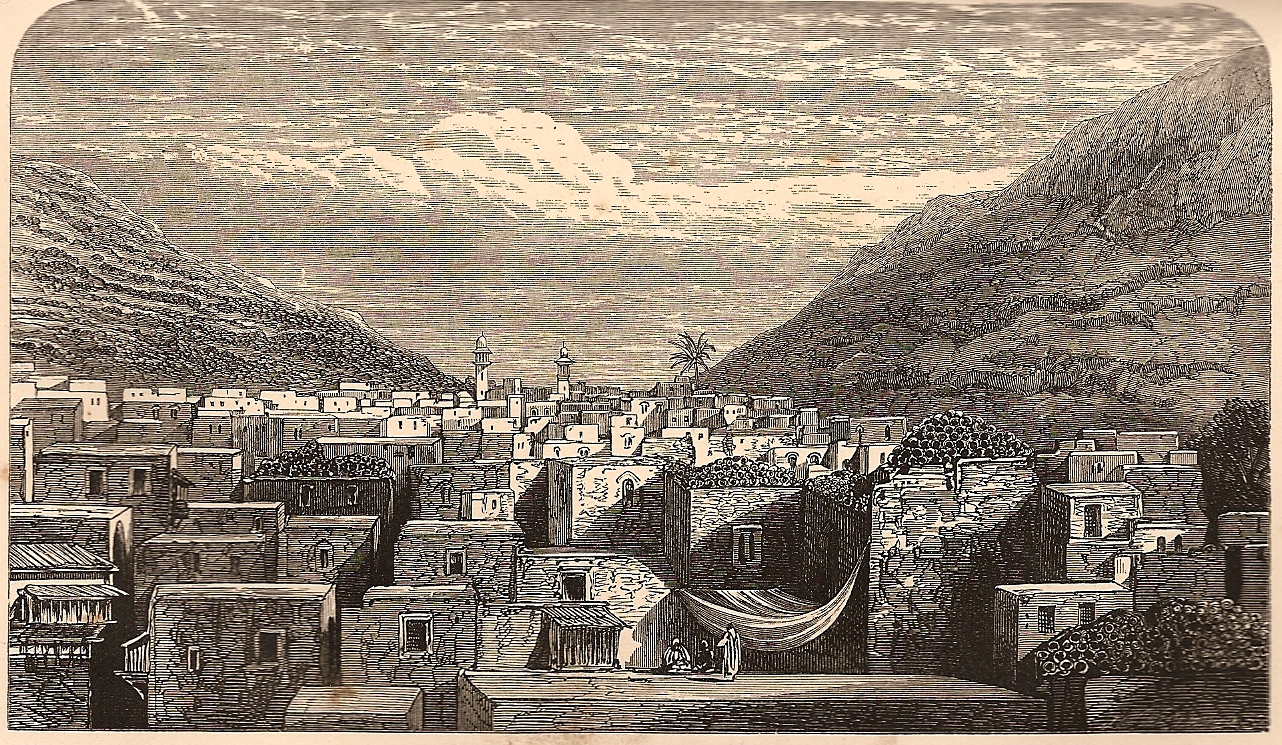
Nablus, by W. C. P. Medlycott, in H. B. Tristram, 1865

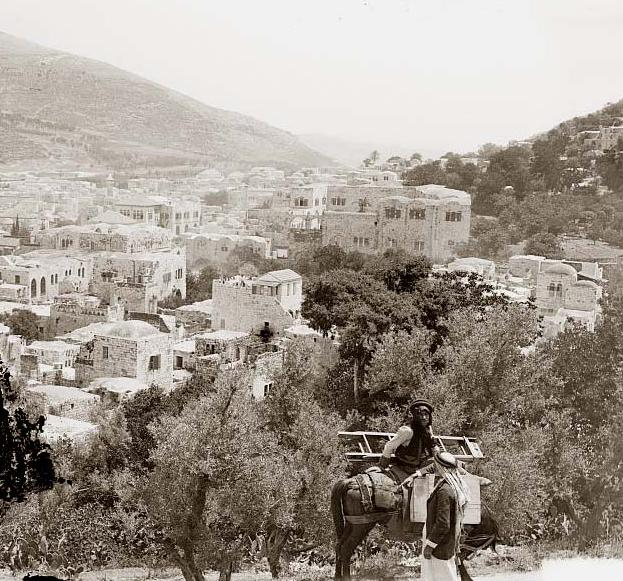
The Old City of Nablus in 1898

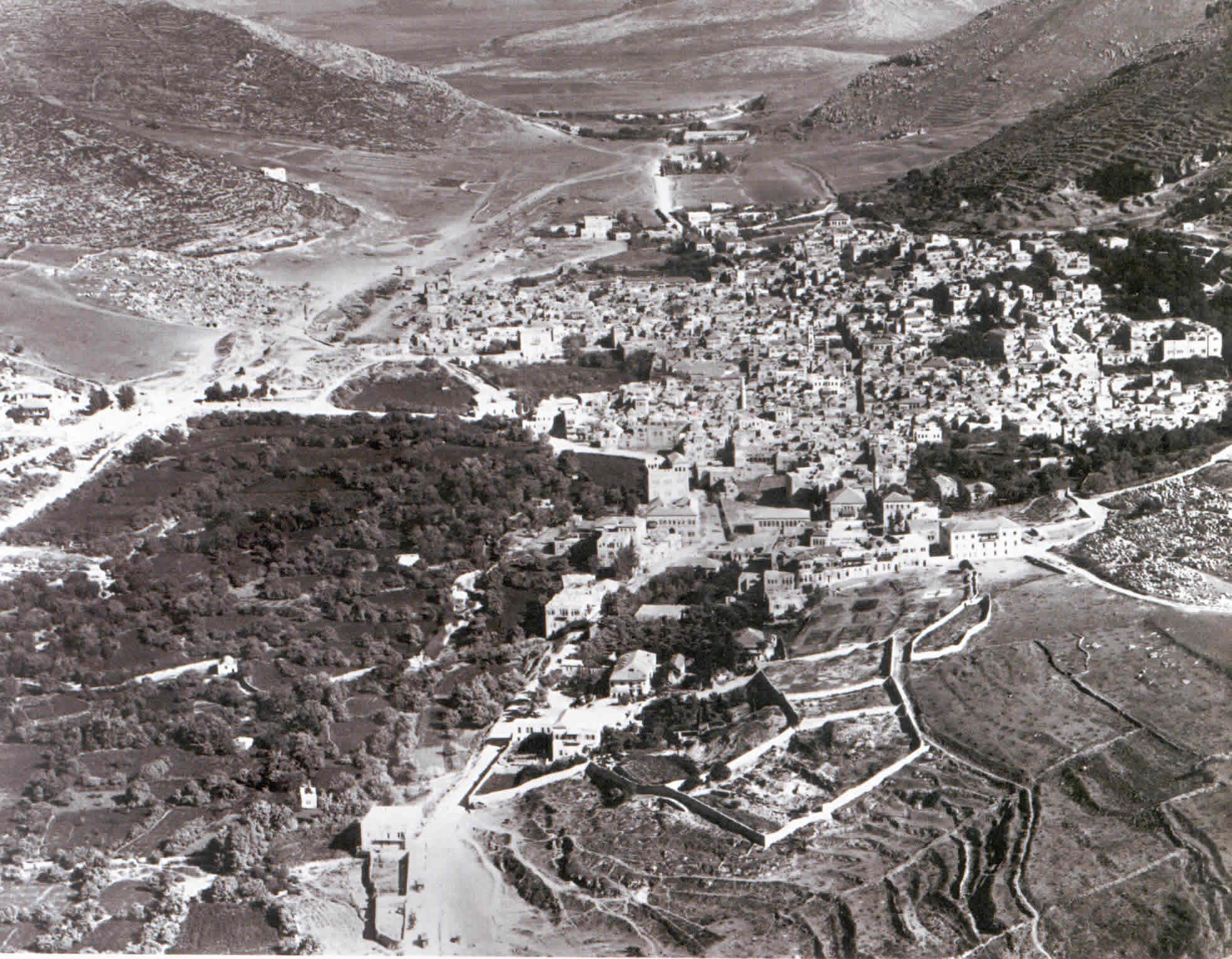
The Old City of Nablus in 1918

== Bibliography ==
- International Council on Monuments and Sites (2002-04-11). "Palestine: Destruction in the West Bank, April 2002". ICOMOS World Report on Monuments and Sites in Danger 2002: Heritage @ Risk.
- Abujidi, Nurhan (2023). "Weaponised Heritage: Urbicide by Construction and Destruction in Nablus, Palestine". In Zarandona, J.A.G.; Cunliffe, E.; Saldin, M. (eds.). The Routledge Handbook of Heritage Destruction. Routledge Handbooks on Museums, Galleries and Heritage. Taylor & Francis. pp. 343–356. ISBN 978-1-000-89003-7.
- Abujidi, Nurhan (2014). Urbicide in Palestine: Spaces of Oppression and Resilience. Routledge Studies in Middle Eastern Politics. Taylor & Francis. ISBN 978-1-317-81884-7.
- Abujidi, Nurhan; Verschure, Han (2006-07-01). "Military Occupation as Urbicide by Construction and Destruction: The Case of Nablus, Palestine". The Arab World Geographer. 9 (2). Allen Press: 126–154. ISSN 1480-6800.
- Welfare Association (Taawon) (2011). "Nablus, Enduring Heritage and Continuing Civilisation - The revitalization plan of the old city". Le projet LINK UP - The LINK UP project.
- Tawayha, Fajer Al; Braganca, Luis; Mateus, Ricardo (2019-02-09). "Contribution of the Vernacular Architecture to the Sustainability: A Comparative Study between the Contemporary Areas and the Old Quarter of a Mediterranean City". Sustainability. 11 (3). MDPI AG: 896. Bibcode:2019Sust...11..896T. doi:10.3390/su11030896. hdl:1822/59020. ISSN 2071-1050.
- Taher, Muath; Correia, Jorge (2015-08-26). 2nd International Multidisciplinary Scientific Conference on Social Sciences and Arts SGEM2015. Vol. 1. doi:10.5593/sgemsocial2015b4. hdl:1822/44238. ISBN 978-619-7105-50-6. ISSN 2367-5659.
- Doumani, B. (1995). Rediscovering Palestine: Merchants and Peasants in Jabal Nablus, 1700–1900. University of California Press. ISBN 978-0-520-20370-9.
- United Nations Office for the Coordination of Humanitarian Affairs (2004-01-06). "Initial Report: Humanitarian consequences of the IDF operation in the old city of Nablus". OCHA.
- Yousof, Mohammad Ata (1989), General guidelines for developing and preserving the historic old city of "Nablus" - West Bank, Kansas State University
- Hohmann, Hasso; Dokonal, Wolfgang; Doytchinov, Grigor; Hohmann-Vogrin, Anna Margaretha; Zancanella, Johann (2003). Master Plan for the Preservation and further Development of the Historic Centre of Nablus, Palestine. ISG. ISBN 978-3-900821-03-6.
- ISG-Magazin 2001-3 Historic Centre of Nablus - its preservation, adaptation and future
  - Doytchinov, Grigor (2001). "Introduction. Preservation and Adaptation of the Historic Centre of Nablus, Palestine". ISG-Magazin. 3: 4–7.
  - Hohmann-Vogrin, Anna Margaretha; Hohmann, Hasso; Fanni, Ibrahim Al (2001). "Archaeology/ Nablus". ISG-Magazin (3): 8–11.
  - Hohmann-Vogrin, Anna Margaretha (2001). "Architectural Heritage". ISG-Magazin (3/2001): 12–15.
  - Doytchinov, Grigor (2001). "Development Concept". ISG-Magazin (3): 16–18.
