= Al Khadra =

Al Khadra may refer to:

- Al Khadra, Libya
- Al Khadra, Jizan, Saudi Arabia
- Al Khadra, Mecca, Saudi Arabia
- Al Khadra, Oman
