= An-Nasr Mosque =

Sunni mosque in Nablus, Palestine

- مسجد النصر
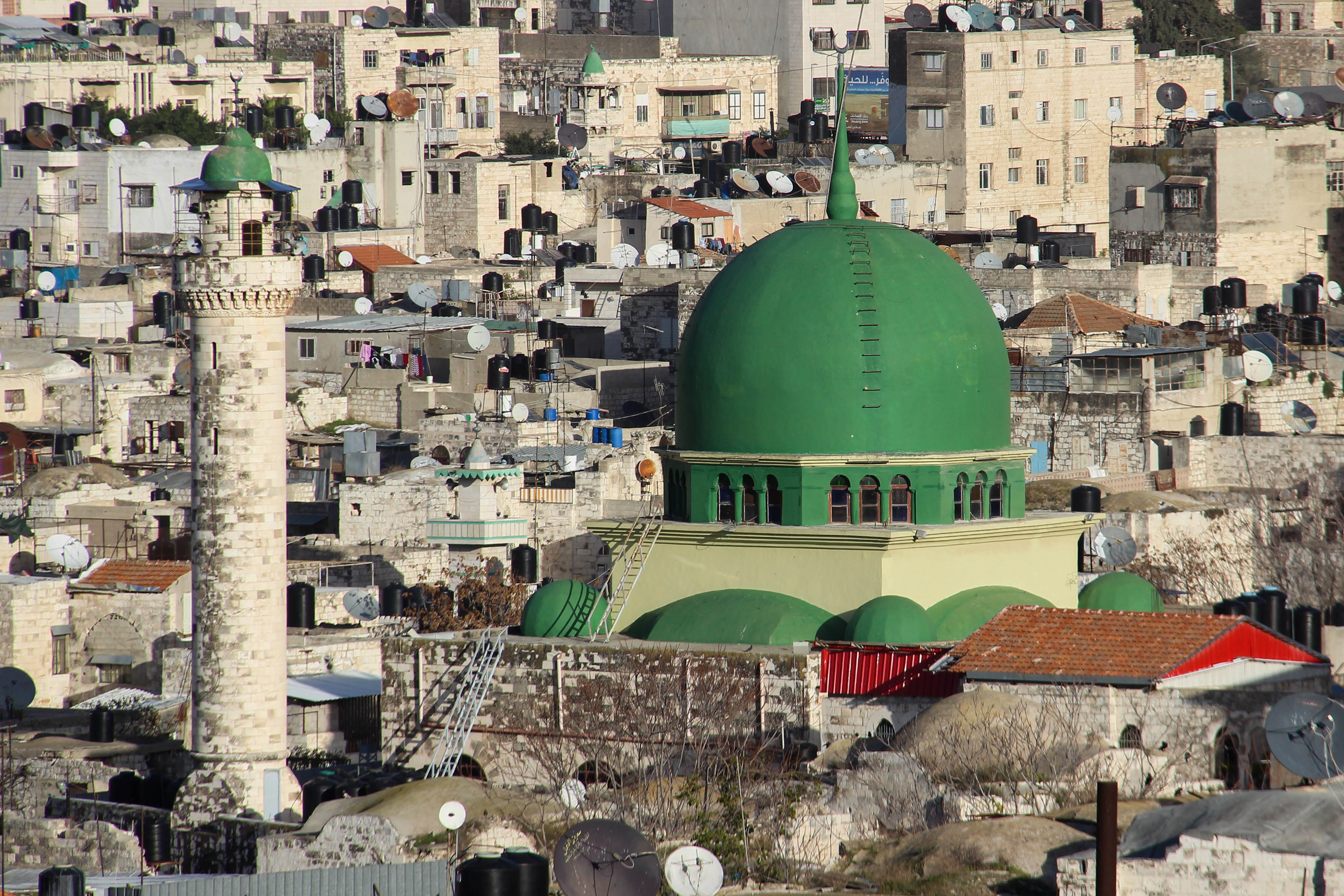
- The mosque in 2014

- Location within the West Bank

Religion
- Affiliation: Islam
- Branch/tradition: Sunni

Location
- Location: Nablus, West Bank, Palestine
- Coordinates: 32.2189°N 35.2614°E

Architecture
- Type: mosque
- Completed: 1935

Specifications
- Dome: 1
- Minaret: 1

An-Nasr Mosque (Arabic: مسجد النصر, romanized: Masjid an-Naṣr, lit. 'Victory Mosque') is a mosque located in Nablus, Palestine. It is situated in the central square of the Old City of Nablus and is donned as the "symbol of Nablus". An-Nasr Mosque has a turquoise dome and its prayer room is located in the second floor of the building.

== History ==
Originally, an-Nasr was a Byzantine church, and then the Templars constructed a small church which consisted of a circular building with a red dome during the Crusader rule of Palestine. The Crusaders lost Nablus in 1187 to the Ayyubids and by the 14th century Nablus was in Mamluk hands. The Mamluks transformed the Crusader church into the three-nave an-Nasr Mosque. Medieval masonry marks are found in the building, discovered in 1896 by Charles Simon Clermont-Ganneau. Clermont-Ganneau also mentioned buttresses on the exterior of the building.

17th century ottoman traveler Evliya Çelebi recognized the mosque as "formerly a large monastery", and noted that the garnet colored columns were uncommon.

=== 20th century ===
The Ottomans built a government building adjacent to the mosque. An-Nasr was destroyed by an earthquake that struck Nablus in 1927.

The Supreme Muslim Council under Amin al-Husayni constructed the an-Nasr Mosque on the site with a completely different structural design in 1935. The reconstruction was supervised by Shaykh Amr Arafat, a resident of Nablus whose clan — the Fityanis — served as the mosque's waqf superintendents. The imam of the mosque is traditionally of the Hanafi fiqh. According to Islamic tradition, an-Nasr Mosque is built on the exact spot where Yaqub (Jacob) was brought the "bloody and tattered coat" of Yusuf (Joseph) by his sons.

In February 1998, violence in Nablus between Israeli soldiers and Palestinians that resulted in several Palestinian deaths occurred after Israeli soldiers squabbled with Palestinian worshippers at an-Nasr Mosque.

=== 2025 fire ===
On March 7, 2025, the Israeli forces stormed several mosques in the city of Nablus in the northern West Bank. According to the Palestinian news agency WAFA and the Ministry of Awqaf and Religious Affairs, they set fire to an-Nasr Mosque and prevented firefighters from extinguishing the blaze. According to eyewitnesses, the fire damaged the imam's quarters, as well as parts of the mosque's walls and carpets. The Ministry of Religious Affairs and the director of the Nablus Waqf condemned the incident, calling it a serious violation of religious and international norms. The Globe and Mail reported that when asked for comment, the military stated it was "not aware" of any fires set by troops on the site.

A day after the fire, volunteers and charity organizations began renovating and repairing the damaged parts of the mosque. The imam's chamber portion of the mosque was damaged, and the new carpet were donated by local business men. On the 25th of June, 2025, it was announced that the mosque has been reopened.

== Gallery ==
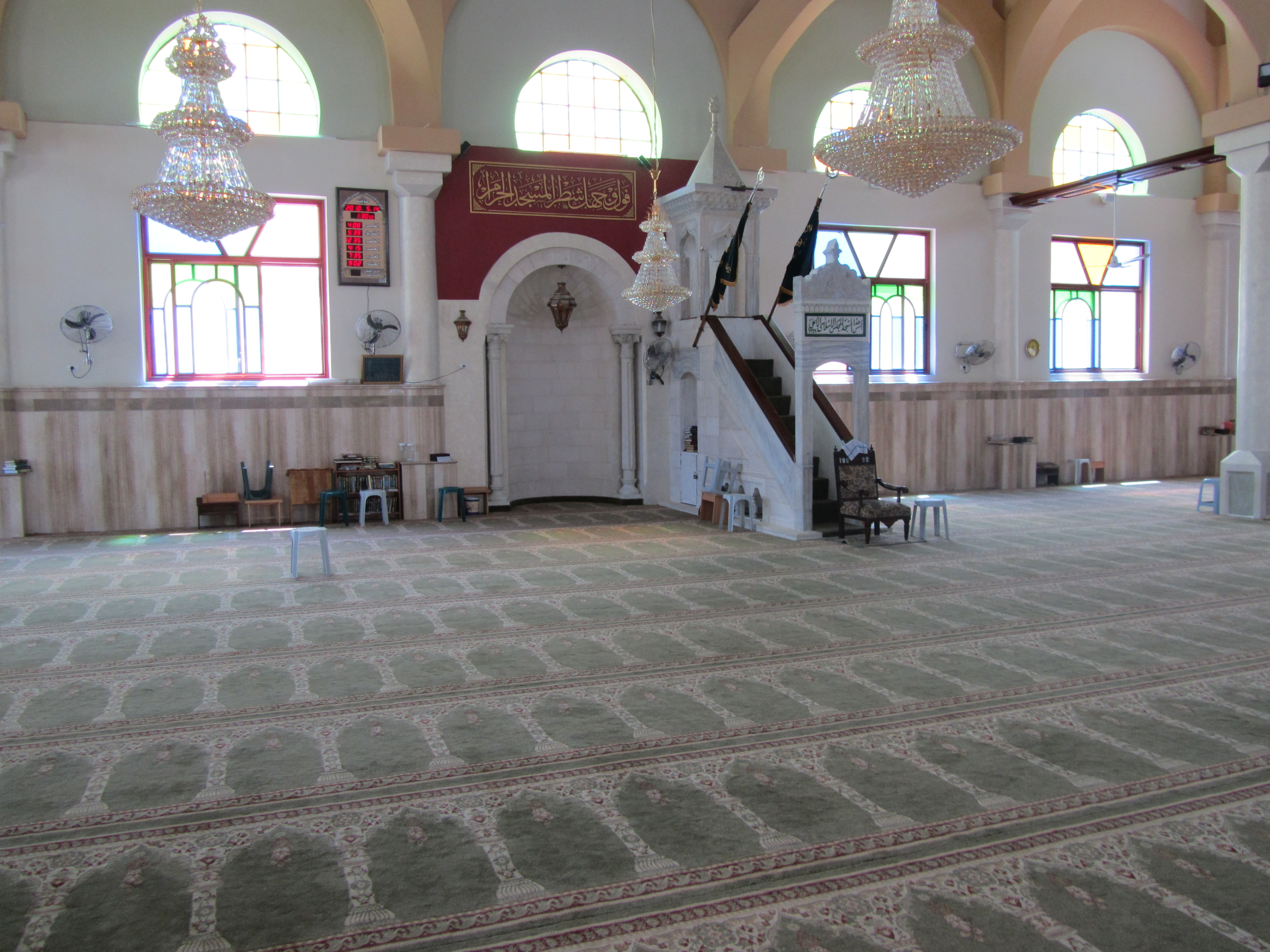
Interior view, 2010

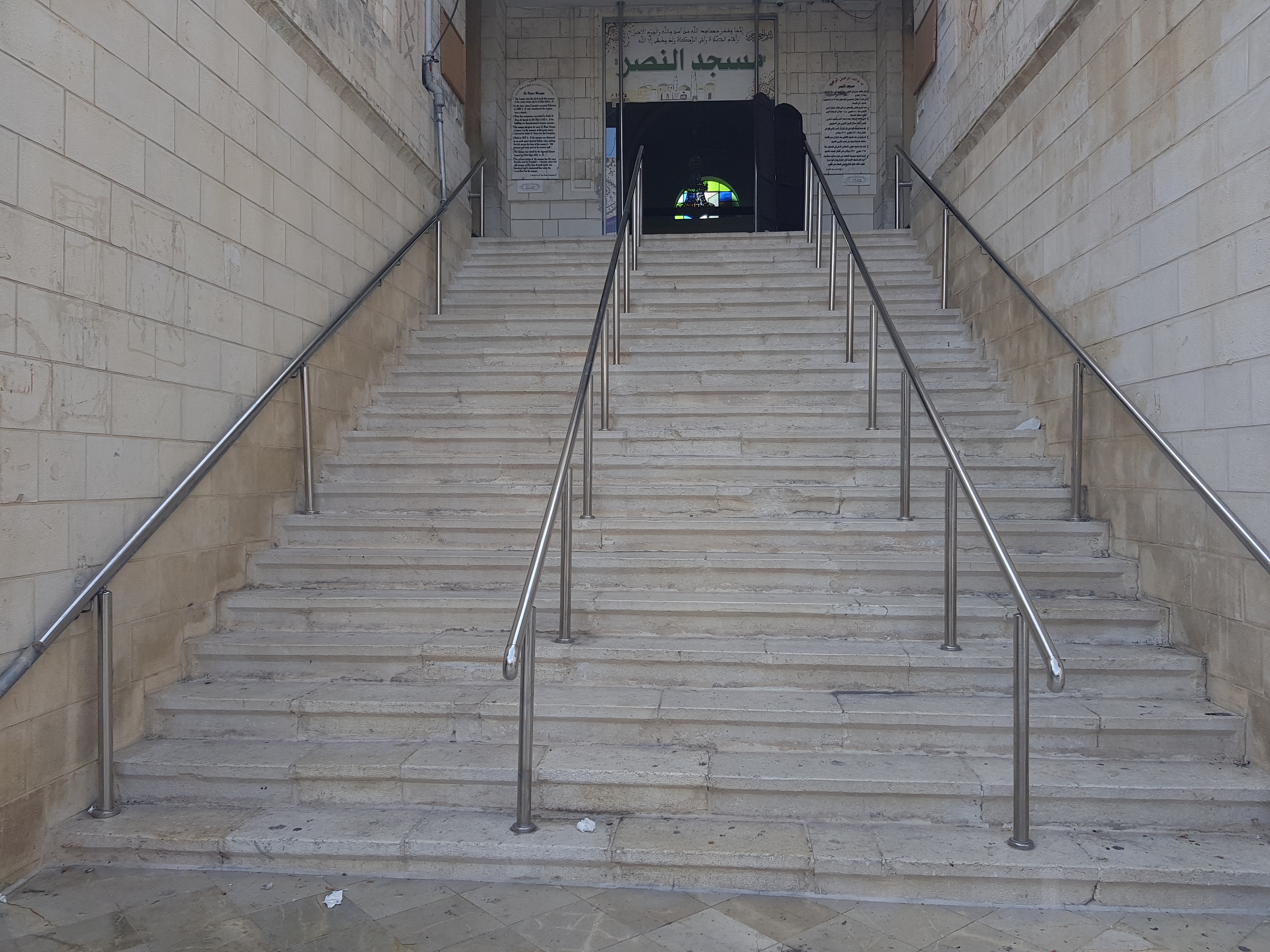
Entrance stairs

The mosque with its green dome in downtown Nablus, the Manara Clock Tower is seen in the middle.

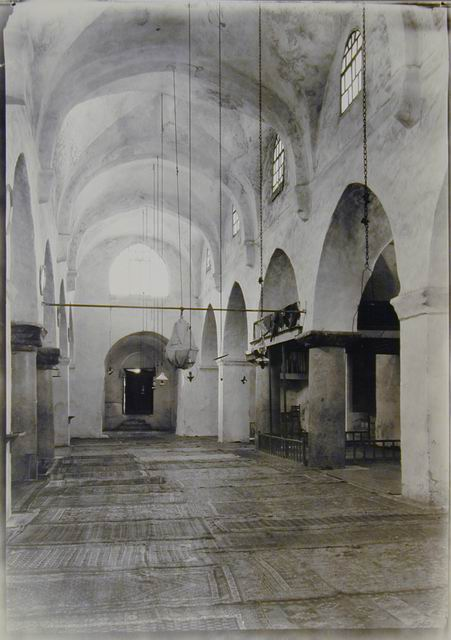
Interior view of Nasr Mosque, c. early 20th century, by K. A. C. Creswell.

== See also ==
- List of mosques in Palestine
- Islam in Palestine
- Great Mosque of Nablus
