= Khadra (name) =

Khadra is a name of Arabic origin which is used as a surname and a feminine given name. Notable people with the name include:

== Given name ==
- Khadra Ahmed Dualeh, Somalian politician and diplomat
- Khadra Bashir Ali (died 2021), Somalian politician
- Khadra Dahir Cige (1957–2022), Somalian singer
- Khadra Haji Ismail Geid, Somalian politician
- Al Khadra Mabrook (1934–2021), Sahrawi poet
- Khadra Hussein Mohammad, Somalian lawyer

== Middle name ==
- Salma Khadra Jayyusi (1925–2023), Palestinian poet and anthologist

== Surname ==
- Aida El-Khadra, American particle physicist
- Hatem Abu Khadra (born 1990), Palestinian Jordanian football player
- Pierre Khadra, Lebanese dancer and choreographer
- Reda Khadra (born 2001), German football player
- Salwa Abu Khadra (1929–2024), Palestinian politician and educator
- Subhi al-Khadra (1895–1955), Palestinian politician and lawyer

== Other ==
- Yasmina Khadra, pen name of Mohammed Moulessehoul (born 1955), Algerian writer
