= Hanbali Mosque =

Mosque in Nablus, West Bank, Palestine

- المسجد الحنبلي
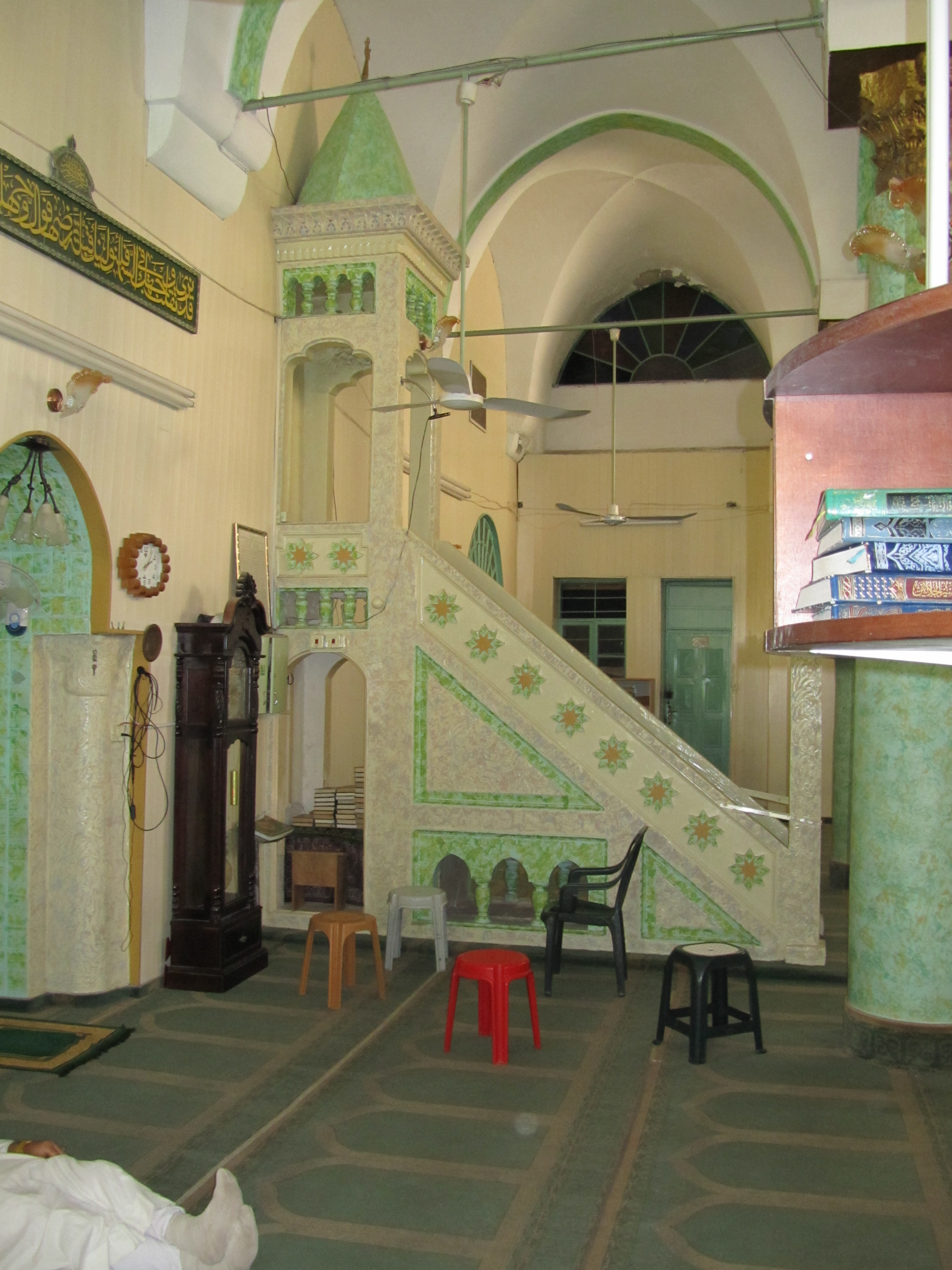
- The mosque interior in 2010
- Location of the mosque in the West Bank

Religion
- Affiliation: Sunni Islam
- Ecclesiastical or organizational status: Mosque
- Status: Active

Location
- Location: Nablus, West Bank
- Country: Palestine
- Interactive map of Hanbali Mosque
- Coordinates: 32°13′10.5″N 35°15′42.3″E

Architecture
- Style: Ottoman
- Completed: c. 1527 CE
- Minaret: 1

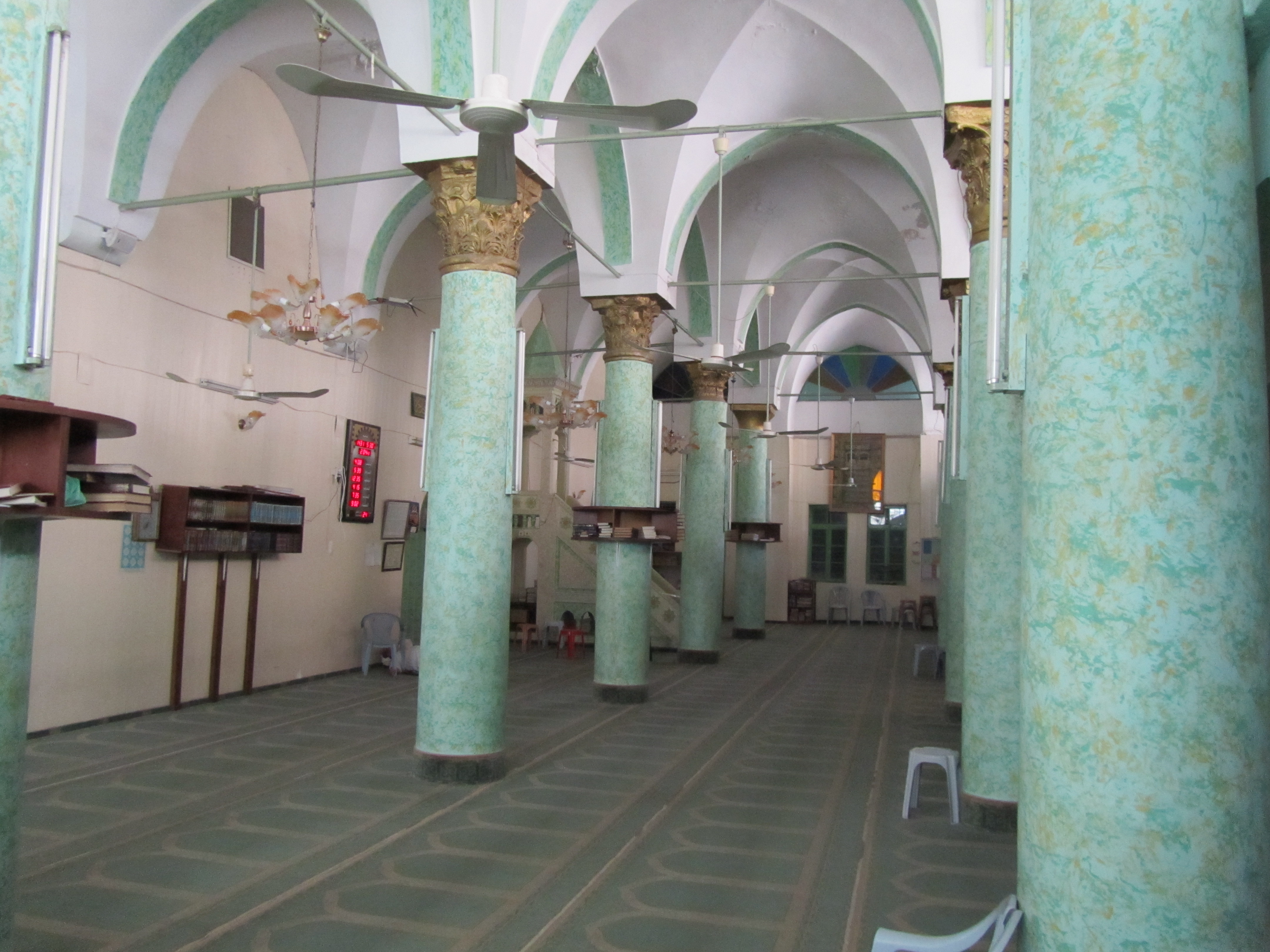
Al Hanbali Mosque Nablus Interior

The Hanbali Mosque (Arabic: المسجد الحنبلي, romanized: al-Masjid al-Ḥanbalī) is a mosque in Nablus, West Bank, Palestine. The mosque is situated off Jama'a Kabir Street, south of Martyr's Square, and west of the Great Mosque of Nablus.

== History ==
The Hanbali Mosque was founded by the al-Hanbali family of Nablus in the early 16th-century, between 1526 and 1527, and named after them. Ancient stone pillars with carved capitals were used during the mosque's construction, possibly dating from the Byzantine or Roman eras. According to local Muslim tradition, the wooden box in the mosque preserves three hairs of Muhammad, the prophet of Islam. The box is brought out annually on the 27th day of Ramadan for worshipers to view and seek blessings from.

The minaret of the Hanbali Mosque was rebuilt in 1913. In the 1930s the imam of the mosque, Sheikh Muhammad Radi al-Hanbali maintained connections with the rebel leader Izz al-Din al-Qassam. The Hanbali family administers the mosque's affairs until the present day. During Jordanian rule in the West Bank following the 1948 Arab-Israeli War, it was one of the few mosques that maintained its own zakat committee which would control the collection and distribution of zakat funds throughout the local community.

== See also ==
- List of mosques in Palestine
- Islam in Palestine
