= Manara Clock Tower =

Clock tower in Nablus, Palestine

- برج الساعة
- Interactive map of the Manara Clock Tower area

General information
- Type: clock tower
- Location: Nablus, West Bank, Palestine
- Coordinates: 32.218887°N 35.261409°E
- Year built: 1906

The Manara Clock Tower or al-Manura clock tower (Arabic: برج الساعة, romanized: Burj al-sāʻah) is a clock tower located in the middle of the central square (casbah) in the Old City of Nablus next to the An-Nasr Mosque in the Palestine.

Five stories high, it was erected in 1906 on the orders of the Ottoman sultan Abdul Hamid II to celebrate 30 years of his reign. The tower is similar to those also built by Sultan Abdul Hamid in Tripoli (today in Lebanon) and Jaffa. The Manara Clock Tower has an ode to the sultan in elaborate Arabic calligraphy.

The Manara Clock Tower is currently a part of the symbol of the Municipality of Nablus.

== Bibliography ==
- La Guardia, Anton (2002), War Without End: Israelis, Palestinians, and the Struggle for a Promised Land, Macmillan, ISBN 0-312-27669-9
