= Borj el-Khadra =

Town in Tataouine Governorate, Tunisia

Borj el-Khadra برج الخضراء (Arabic)
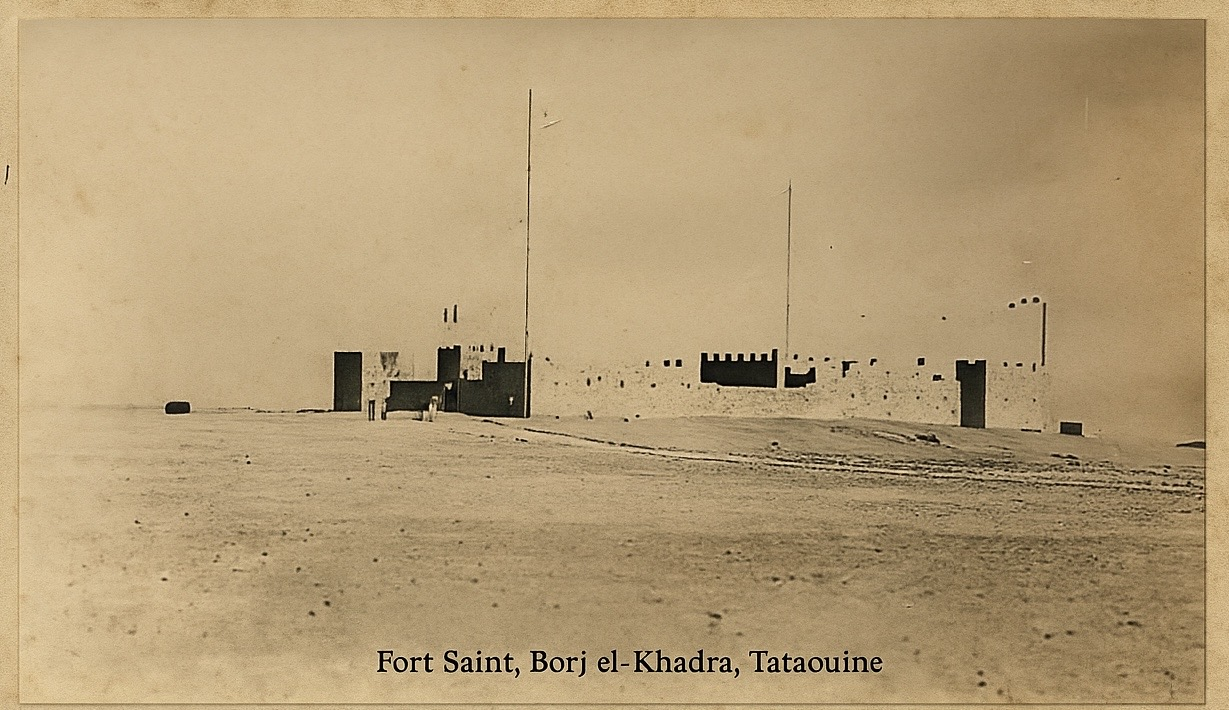

- Location in Tunisia
- Coordinates: 30°15′15.91″N 9°33′18″E
- Country: Tunisia
- Governorate: Tataouine Governorate
- Time zone: UTC1 (CET)

Borj el-Khadra (Arabic: برج الخضراء), formerly known as Fort Saint, is the southernmost settlement in Tunisia. It is located in the Tataouine Governorate near the tripoint between Tunisia, Algeria, and Libya.

It is 396 kilometres (246 mi) from Tatouine, the nearest city and 927 kilometres (576 mi) from Tunis, the capital city. There is no legal way to cross the border at Borj el-Khadra.
