= 1927 Jericho earthquake =

Earthquake in Mandatory Palestine and Transjordan

- Location within Israel
- UTC time: 1927-07-11 13:04:10
- ISC event: 909378
- USGS-ANSS: ComCat
- Local date: July 11, 1927
- Local time: 15:04:10
- Magnitude: 6.3 M_{w}
- Depth: 15 km (9.3 mi)
- Epicenter: 31.6°N 35.4°E
- Areas affected: Mandatory Palestine; Transjordan
- Total damage: Serious damage to Jericho, Ramla, Tiberias, Nablus and Jerusalem
- Max. intensity: MSK-64 IX (Destructive); MMI IX (Violent)
- Casualties: 285–500

The 1927 Jericho earthquake was a devastating event that shook Mandatory Palestine and Transjordan on July 11 at 15:04 local time. The epicenter of the earthquake was in the northern area of the Dead Sea. The cities of Jerusalem, Jericho, Ramla, Tiberias, and Nablus were heavily damaged, and between 285 and 400 people were estimated to have been killed.

== Earthquake ==
In 1977, Vered and Striem placed the earthquake's epicenter near the Damya Bridge in the Jordan Valley and close to the city of Jericho. Later research by Avni, published in 1993, placed the epicenter around 50 km south of this location in the northern part of the Dead Sea. The latter was approved by Zohar and Marco in 2012 and by Zohar et al., in 2014.

== Effects ==
=== Mandatory Palestine ===
The death toll in Jerusalem included more than 130 people and around 450 were injured. About 300 houses collapsed or were severely damaged to the point of not being usable. The earthquake also caused heavy damage to the domes of the Church of the Holy Sepulchre and the al-Aqsa Mosque.

The earthquake was especially severe in Nablus, where it destroyed around 300 buildings, including the Mosque of Victory and the historic parts of the Great Mosque of Nablus. The death toll in Nablus included more than 150 people and around 250 were injured.

In Jericho, a number of houses collapsed, including several relatively new hotels. In one of the hotels, three female tourists from India were killed. Ramla and Tiberias were also heavily damaged.

=== Emirate of Transjordan ===
The most affected city in Transjordan was Salt in which 80 people were killed. In the rest of Transjordan another 20 people were killed.

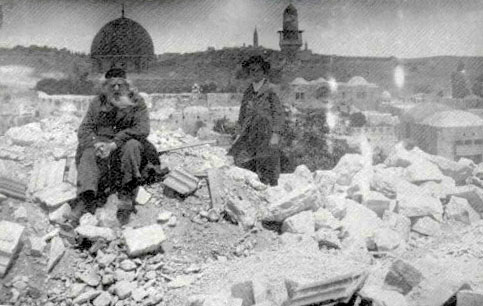
Destruction in the Jewish Quarter of Jerusalem

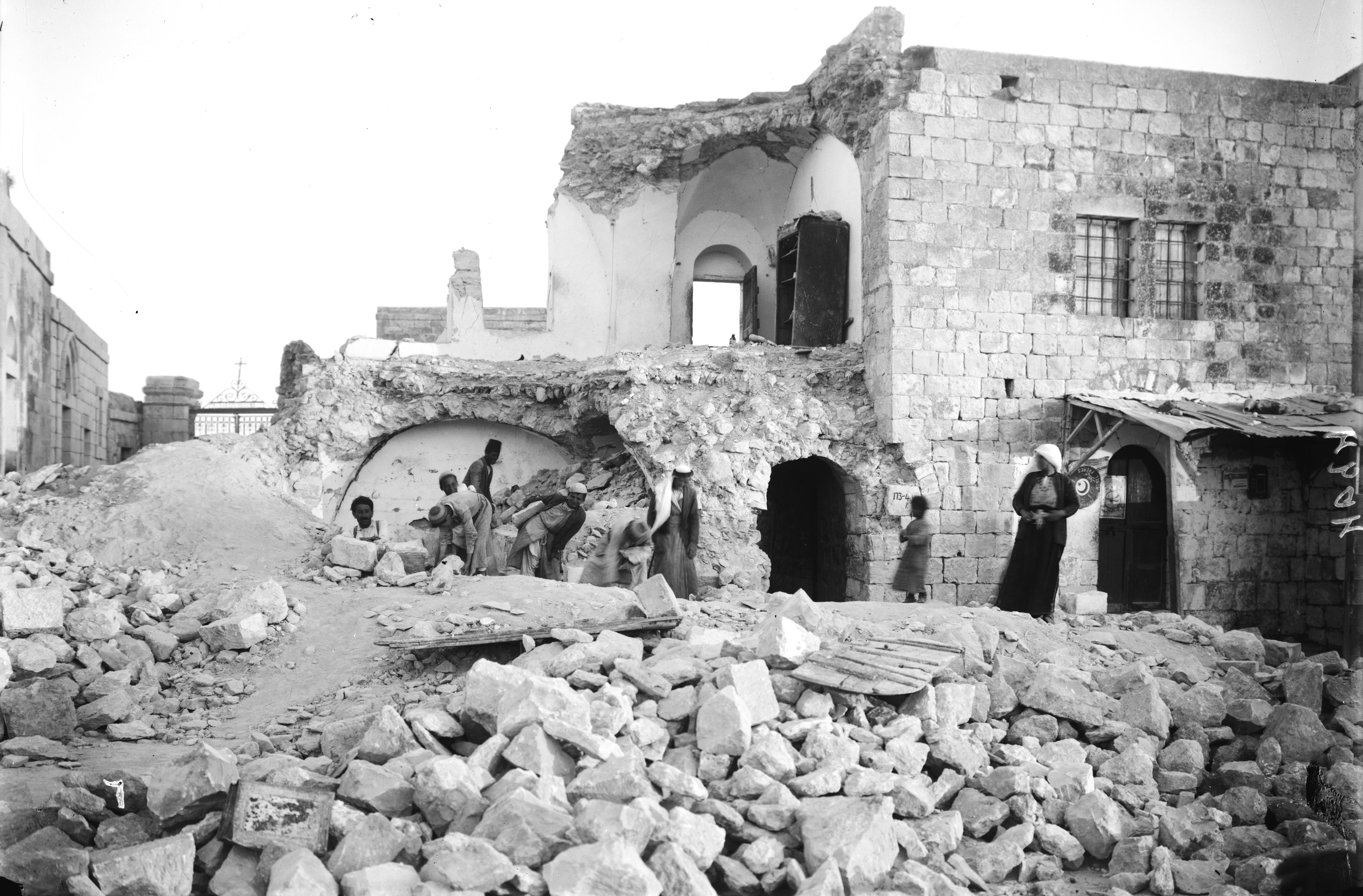
This is the Russian Monastery of Ascension on the Mount of Olives in which three people were killed. The iron gate on the left includes text in Russian: Русская Духовная Миссия ('Russian Ecclesiastical Mission')

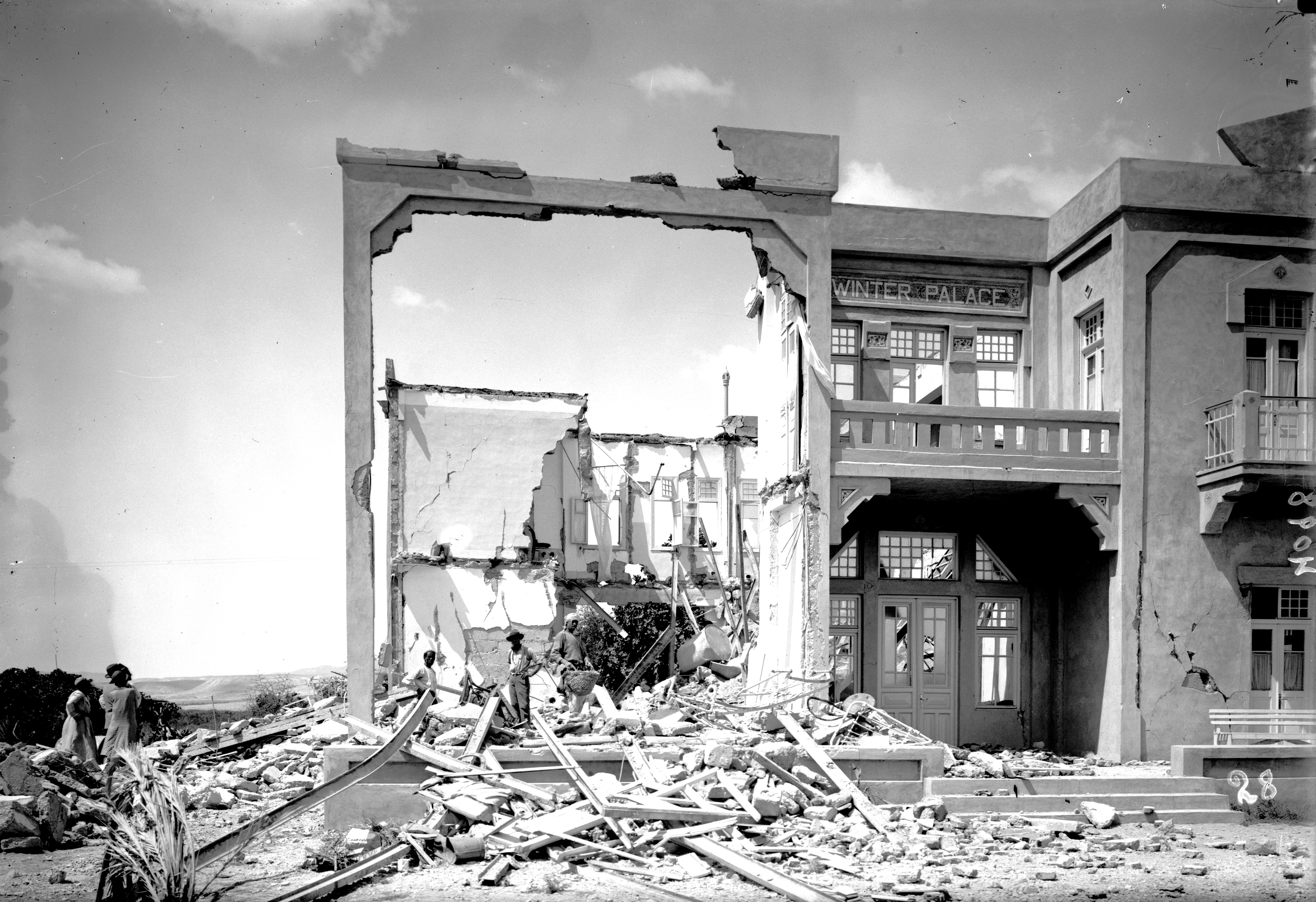
The destroyed Winter Palace Hotel in Jericho

== See also ==
- Dead Sea Transform
- List of earthquakes in 1927
- List of earthquakes in the Levant

== Notes and references ==
Sources

- Avni, R.; (1999), 1927 Jericho earthquake - Comprehensive Macroseismic Analysis Based on Contemporary Sources. Theis Submitted to the Senat of Ben-Gurion University of the Nehev, in Partial Fulfillment of the Requierments for the Degree of Ph.D. (in Hebrew, Abstract in English)
- Avni, R.; Bowman, D.; Shapira, A.; Nur, A. (2002), "Erroneous interpretation of historical documents related to the epicenter of the 1927 Jericho earthquake in the Holy Land" (PDF), Journal of Seismology, 6 (6), Kluwer Academic Publishers: 469–476, Bibcode:2002JSeis...6..469A, doi:10.1023/A:1021191824396, S2CID 129021633, archived from the original (PDF) on 2009-01-07
- Zohar, M.; Marco, S. (2012), "Re-estimating the epicenter of the 1927 Jericho earthquake using spatial distribution of intensity data" (PDF), Journal of Applied Geophysics, 82, Elsevier: 19–29, Bibcode:2012JAG....82...19Z, doi:10.1016/j.jappgeo.2012.03.004, archived from the original (PDF) on 4 December 2013
- Zohar, M.; Rubin, R.; Salamon, A. (2014), "Earthquake Damage and Repair: New Evidence from Jerusalem on the 1927 Jericho Earthquake", Seismological Research Letters, 85 (4), Seismological Society of America: 912–922, Bibcode:2014SeiRL..85..912Z, doi:10.1785/0220140009
