= Khadra Haji Ismail Geid =

Somali politician

Khadra Haji Ismail Geid خضرة الحاج اسماعيل غيد
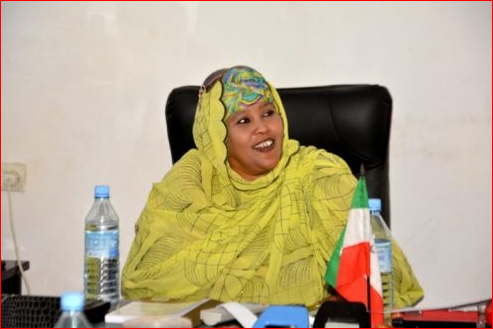

7th Mayor of Gabiley
- In office May 2011 – March 2012
- Preceded by: Adan Muhumed Bedde
- Succeeded by: Ahmed Muhumed Qalib

Personal details
- Born: Gabiley, Somaliland
- Party: Peace, Unity, and Development Party

Khadra Haji Ismail Geid (Somali: Khadra Xaaji Ismaaciil Geydh, Somali: خضرة الحاج اسماعيل غيد) is a Somali politician. In 2011, she became the mayor of Gabiley City, and the first woman mayor in Somaliland.

== Biography ==
In 1964 or 1965, Khadra was born in the Gabiley District. She belongs to the Sa'ad Musa clan of Habr Awal of Isaaq clan.

In 1969, Khadra's father ran for a parliamentary seat in the Gabiley district.

=== Gabiley council ===
In the 2002 local elections, Khadra joined the Kurmiye Party, led by Ahmed Siranyo, who would later become president. Khadra became a local council member in Gabiley. She was the first woman to be elected to a local council in Somaliland.

In 2006, Khadra became the Deputy Mayor of Gabiley. (In Somaliland, the terms “chairperson” and “vice-chairperson” of a local council are synonymous with ‘mayor’ and “deputy mayor.”)

=== Mayor of Gabiley ===
In May 2011, the Gabiley mayor, Aden Muhumed, was removed due to corruption allegations. After that, the 18-member district council elected Khadra as the acting mayor of Gabiley. She was becoming the first woman mayor in Somaliland's history. her after Her appointment was a major change in the male-dominated politics of the region, where leadership roles were traditionally not open to women.

As of September 2011, Khadra ’s role and new position have been hailed as a success by influential local political commentators, and her approval rating currently stands at an impressive 72%.

In November 2011, Khadra, the mayor of Gabiley, and Ali Adan Meadh, the regional governor, started the construction of a new guest house in the northern part of the city. Since there was no public land left, the local government had to buy private land for this project. This was the fourth major development project started in the district that month.

In February 2012, traditional leaders from the Sacad Muuse clan presented a certificate of honor to Khadra, the mayor of Gabiley. They praised her for her great work and development projects, especially the construction of new paved roads and the expansion of the local government center. The ceremony was held at the local government headquarters and was attended by regional officials.

On 10 March 2012, a political tension arose in Gabiley when 12 local councillors tried to hold a meeting to remove Khadra from her position as mayor. The police stopped them from entering the building, leading to a fight. The councillors broke windows in the government offices and the new hall, and the police arrested all 12 of them.

On 14 March 2012, Khadra led a special local council meeting to choose a new leader. Out of the 21 council members, 17 attended the meeting, where they elected Ahmed Muxumed Qaalib as the new mayor with 16 votes. During this session, the council also restored the official rights of Aadan Muxumed Badde, the former mayor who had served before Khadra. Although a legal argument regarding his voting rights caused Khadra to briefly walk out, she returned, congratulated the new mayor, and officially became the deputy mayor.

On 31 March 2012, First Lady Amina Weris Sh. Mohamed Jirdeh recognized Khadra for the successful work she had achieved during her one-year tenure as mayor. Her praised achievements included building new roads in the city center, repairing the local government building, adding a large conference hall, and starting a guest house.

=== Director General of the Ministry of Presidential Affairs ===
In January 2016, President Ahmed Mohamed Mohamoud Silanyo appointed Khadra as the new Director General in the Ministry of Presidential Affairs. She replaced Hassan Abdi Madar, who was relieved of his duties. The president chose her for the position because of her capability, knowledge, and integrity.

In August 2017, a political conflict between Khadra and her sister, Sahra Haji Geid, became public. Sahra joined the opposition Waddani party and openly criticized Khadra, who was the Director General of the Presidency, as well as the ruling Kulmiye party.

In December 2017, President Muse Bihi removed the Ministry of Presidential Affairs to make a smaller government cabinet. Because the ministry was closed, the former Minister, Mohamoud Hashi Abdi, officially handed over the remaining office work to Khadra, the Director General of the Presidency.

In February 2018, Khadra officially resigned from her newly appointed position as the Deputy Chairperson of the Somaliland Quality Control Commission, shortly after being selected by President Muse Bihi. She turned down the role for personal reasons, choosing to serve the public without holding this specific office.
