= Al Khadra, Mecca =

Al Khadra
- Village
- Location in Saudi Arabia
- Coordinates: 21°28′04″N 39°54′17″E
- Country: Saudi Arabia
- Province: Mecca Province
- Time zone: UTC+3 (EAT)
  - Summer (DST): UTC+3 (EAT)

Al Khadra is a village in Mecca Province, in western Saudi Arabia.

== See also ==
- List of cities and towns in Saudi Arabia
- Regions of Saudi Arabia
