= Great Mosque of Nablus =

Mosque in Nablus, Palestine

- جامع نابلس الكبير
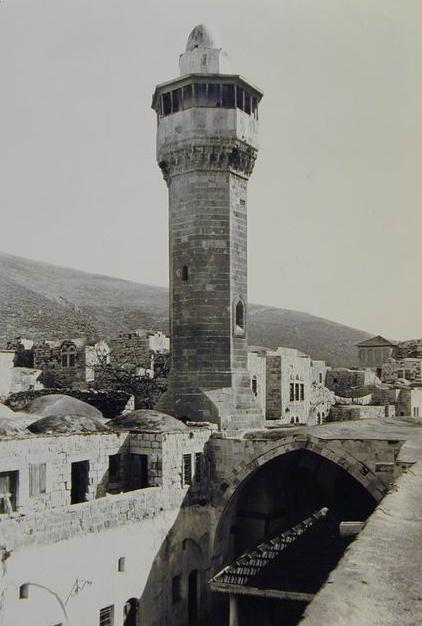
- The mosque in the early 20th century

- Location of the mosque in the West Bank

Religion
- Affiliation: Sunni Islam
- Ecclesiastical or organisational status: Mosque

Location
- Location: Old City, Nablus, West Bank
- Country: Palestine
- Interactive map of Great Mosque of Nablus
- Coordinates: 32°13′4.82″N 35°16′9.64″E

Architecture
- Style: Early Arab; Ayyubid
- Completed: 10th century CE (converted from a church); 1187 (reconverted from a church); 13th century (rebuilt after destruction); 1641 (minaret rebuilt); 1935 (after earthquake)

Specifications
- Dome: 1
- Minaret: 1

The Great Mosque of Nablus (Arabic: جامع نابلس الكبير, romanized: Jami' Nablus al-Kebir) is the oldest and largest mosque in the city of Nablus, in the State of Palestine. It was originally built as a Byzantine church and was converted into a mosque during the early Islamic era. The Crusaders transformed it into a church in the 11th century, but it was reconsecrated as a mosque by the Ayyubids in the 12th century. The mosque is located at the intersection of the main streets of the Old City of Nablus, along the district's eastern edges. It has a long, narrow, rectangular floor plan and a silver dome.

== History ==
Local legend in Nablus claims that mosque was the site where Jacob's sons handed Jacob the blood-stained coat of their brother Joseph as evidence that his favorite son was dead. This tradition is more associated with the nearby al-Khadra Mosque, however.

The site of the Great Mosque was originally a basilica built during the reign of Philip the Arab in 244-249 CE. The Byzantines later constructed a cathedral on the basilica's ruins and this cathedral is depicted in the mosaic Map of Madaba in 600 CE. It was likely damaged or destroyed by the Samaritans during their raids in 484 and 529, but Emperor Justinian I (reigned from 483-565) had the cathedral restored.

The cathedral was transformed into the Great Mosque of Nablus in the early period of Islamic Arab rule in Palestine, in the 10th-century. Arab geographer Al-Maqdisi wrote that the Great Mosque was in the “midst” of Nablus, and “is very finely paved.” The Crusaders reconverted the mosque into a church, but made only few alterations including the construction of an apse. In 1187, the Ayyubids led by Saladin converted the building to a mosque again. The building was burned down by the Knights Templar in the sack of the city of 30 October 1242.

A new building was present by the end of the 13th century, as evidenced by Arab chronicler al-Dimashqi who, in 1300, mentioned the Great Mosque as “a fine mosque, in which prayer is performed, and the Qur'an is recited day and night, men being appointed thereto.” In 1335, Western traveler James of Verona recorded that the mosque had been “a church of the Christians but now is a mosque of the Saracens.” Twenty years later, Ibn Batuta visited it and noted that in the middle of the mosque was a “tank of sweet water.”

In 1641, the Great Mosque's minaret was rebuilt, but the mosque compound had remained virtually untouched throughout most of its later existence until a severe earthquake struck Palestine, especially Nablus in 1927. The mosque's dome and minaret were destroyed as a result, but were restored in 1935.

== See also ==
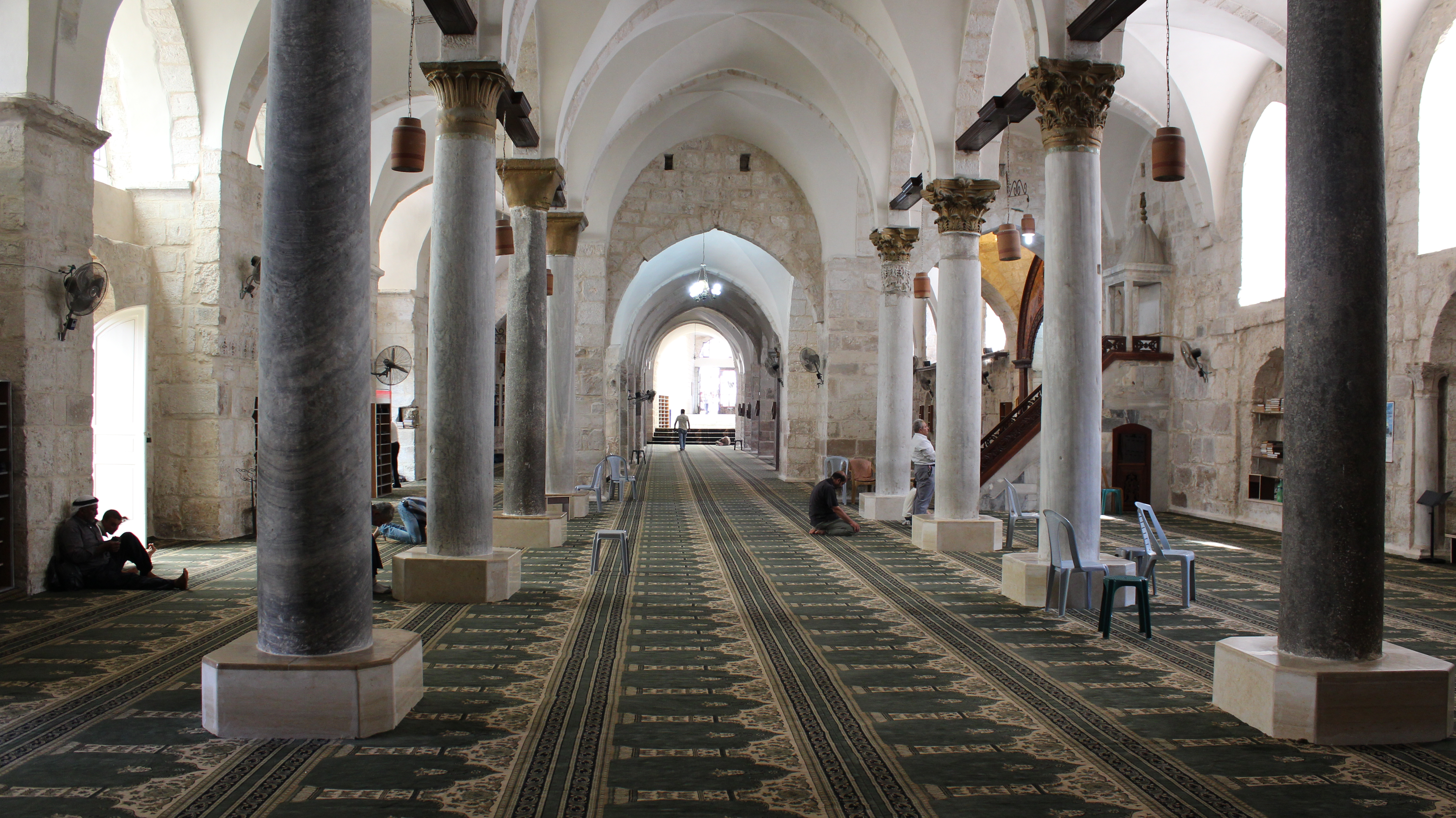
Inside the mosque

- List of mosques in Palestine
- Islam in Palestine
