= Welfare Association (Taawon) =

- Arabic: مؤسسة التعاون
- Formation: 1983
- Type: Non-governmental organization
- Headquarters: Ramallah and Jerusalem
- Region served: Palestine and Palestinian refugee communities
- Website: taawon.org/en

Welfare Association (Taawon; Arabic: مؤسسة التعاون, romanized: Muʼassasat al-Taʻāwun) is a Palestinian non-profit, civic organization launched in 1983 in Geneva, Switzerland. It was founded by a group of Palestinian and Arab businesspeople, academics, and intellectuals to support social, economic, and cultural development among Palestinians.

The association operates programs in Palestine, Palestinian refugee communities in Lebanon, Switzerland, and the United Kingdom through affiliated offices. Its activities focus on education, community development, culture, heritage preservation, humanitarian assistance, and support for civil society organizations.

Since its establishment, the Welfare Association has supported projects in partnership with Palestinian and international institutions, including universities, cultural organizations, healthcare institutions, and community organizations. Its programs include scholarships and educational initiatives, youth and community development, cultural projects, and humanitarian response programs, particularly during crises affecting the Gaza Strip.

One of the association's major initiatives is the Old City Revitalization Program (Arabic: برنامج إحياء البلدات القديمة), launched in 1994 to preserve historic Palestinian urban areas through restoration, rehabilitation, and capacity-building activities. The association was also involved in establishing the Palestinian Museum in Birzeit, which opened to the public in 2016 and focuses on Palestinian history, culture, and contemporary artistic programs.

The Welfare Association and projects supported by it have received international recognition, including the Aga Khan Award for Architecture for the Old City Revitalization Program (2002–2004) and for the Palestinian Museum (2019).
