= Al-Khadra Mosque =

Mosque in Nablus, West Bank, Palestine

- مسجد الخضرة
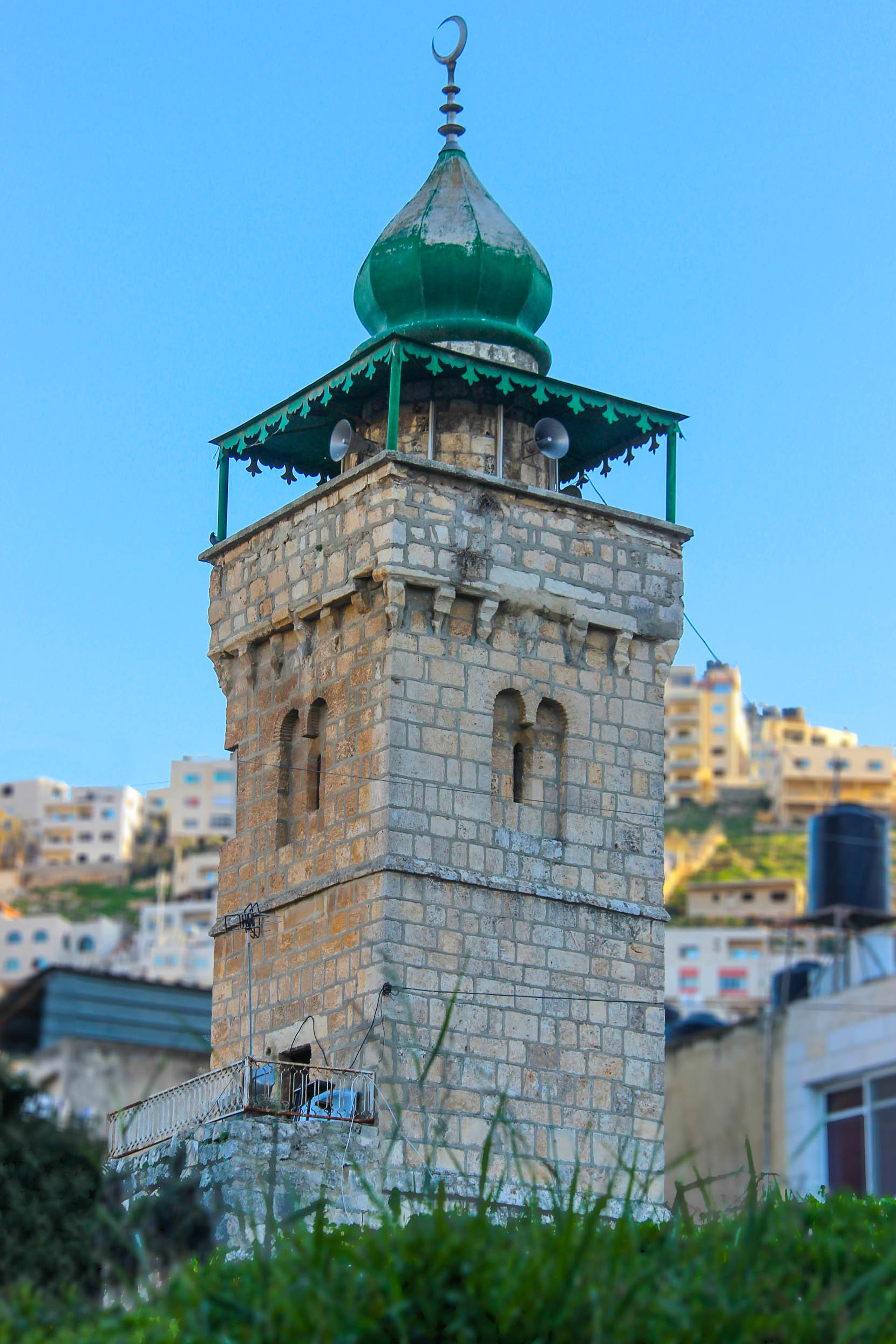
- The mosque minaret in 2015

- Location of the mosque in the West Bank

Religion
- Affiliation: Sunni Islam
- Ecclesiastical or organisational status: Mosque
- Status: Active

Location
- Location: Nablus, West Bank
- Country: Palestine
- Interactive map of Al-Khadra Mosque
- Coordinates: 32°12′44.48″N 35°16′15.20″E

Architecture
- Style: Mamluk
- Groundbreaking: 1288
- Completed: 1290

Specifications
- Length: 18.6 m (61 ft)
- Width: 7.2 m (24 ft)
- Minaret: 1
- Minaret height: 30 m (98 ft)

The Al-Khadra Mosque (Arabic: مسجد الخضرة, romanized: Masjid al-Khadra, lit. 'the Green Mosque') also known as Hizn Sidna Yaq'ub Mosque (trans. Sadness of our Lord Jacob), is a mosque situated on the lower slopes of Mount Gerizim in the southwestern quarter of the Old City of Nablus in the West Bank of the State of Palestine. The mosque is rectangular in shape, and its minaret is 30 metres (98 ft) tall.

== History ==
According to local Muslim tradition, the mosque is situated upon the site where Jacob wept after being shown Joseph's blood-soaked tunic which suggested that he had been mauled and killed; on the right of the courtyard is a small room said to be the place where Jacob sat down and wept. Hence the mosque's alternative name "Sadness of our Lord Jacob".

According to Samaritan tradition, al-Khadra Mosque had been a synagogue destroyed by the Crusaders. They claim that its Arabic name al-Khadra ("the Green") derived from the Samaritan Mahallat Khadra ("the place of the Green"). Archaeologist Michael Avi-Yonah identified the Khadra Mosque with the synagogue built by the Samaritan high priest Akbon in 362 CE.

The synagogue was rebuilt in 1137 by Ab Giluga, a Samaritan from Acre. Several Western scholars, however, believe, because of examples of Gothic architecture in portions of the present-day mosque, that in the 1170s, there stood a Crusader church and bell tower. Arab geographer Yaqut al-Hamawi records in 1225, while Nablus was under Ayyubid rule, the buildings was restored to become a Samaritan synagogue, which he referred to as "a large mosque" which the Samaritans venerated. It is probably from this era that the Samaritan inscriptions on a minaret wall were made.

In 1242, however, the Knights Templars damaged the building, which was later destroyed in 1260 by the Mongols. It was transformed as a mosque in 1290 by the Mamluks during the reign of Sultan Qalawun as attested to by a foundation inscription. Most of the structure resembles Mamluk architecture and a mihrab was added to the mosque.

=== Second Intifada ===
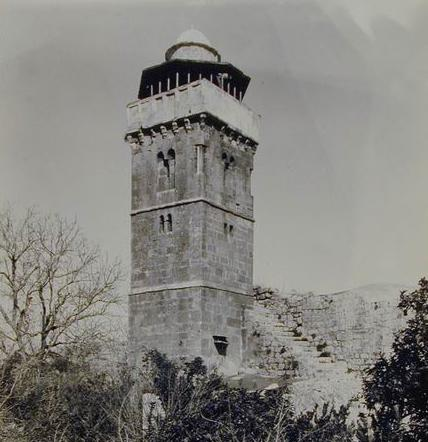
Minaret in the early 20th century

According to the Palestinian government and Gush Shalom, during the Second Intifada in the Battle of Nablus in 2002, Israeli bulldozers destroyed 85% of the mosque, including the Mamluk-era mihrab. The current imam of al-Khadra Mosque, Maher Kharaz (the 'White Lion'), was removed from his position in a Palestinian Authority 'crack down' on militant imams in 1996, but was reinstated in 2006. Kharaz, a Hamas member and opponent of Fatah, regularly defied the Fatah-led Palestinian National Authority during his weekly Friday sermons. Kharaz was arrested on September 23, 2007 in another Fatah-led 'crack down' on Hamas.

== See also ==
- List of mosques in Palestine
- Islam in Palestine
