= Ministry of Health (Palestine) =

Government ministry of Palestine

Agency overview
- Formed: 1948 (first form); 1994 (second form)
- Jurisdiction: Government of Palestine
- Agency executive: Dr. Maged Abu Ramadan, Minister of Health
- Website: site.moh.ps

The Ministry of Health is a ministry in the Palestinian government that is responsible for formulating health policies of Palestine. The Ministry of Health is primarily responsible for the healthcare system in the West Bank, while maintaining some level of administration of and support for medical services in the Gaza Strip.

The foundation of the Palestinian Authority in 1994, upon the signing of the Oslo Accords, led to a shift in authority responsibilities of the healthcare system from the Israeli Administration to the Palestinian Authority. The Palestinian Ministry of Health was founded and since then, the ministry provides majority of health services to the population.

Currently, the ministry is one of Palestine's four key healthcare providers along with the United Nations Relief and Works Agency, non-governmental organizations, and private sector, and in 2013 was operating 27 hospitals and 61% of hospital beds in Palestine. In 2023 it was reported by the Palestinian Central Bureau for Statistics that the number of primary health care centres increased from 706 centres in 2010 to reach 765 centres in 2021, of which the Ministry of Health bears the greatest burden; 64% of the primary centres are affiliated to the Ministry of Health, followed by NGOs by 25%, UNRWA by 9% and Military Medical Services by 2%.

From 2019 to 2024, Dr. Mai al-Kaila was the Minister of Health of Palestine. From 2024 until now, this responsibility has been entrusted to Maged Abu Ramadan.

== Recent activities ==
The Ministry of Health prioritized services focused on overall health such as emergency medical services, and over 13,000 emergency procedures were performed since October 2023. The Health Cluster was also effectively implemented which is a unified platform that brings together local and international health stakeholders in Palestine to coordinate crisis response and recovery efforts.

From 14 October to 5 November 2024, UNICEF, in partnership with the Palestinian Ministry of Health and other organizations, carried out the second phase of a polio immunization drive in the Gaza Strip. The campaign was rolled out in three stages and utilized both health center-based vaccination sites and mobile units to ensure wide coverage. A total of 556,774 children - approximately 271,710 girls and 285,064 boys—were immunized, successfully reaching 94% of the intended child population. The effort was supported by 1,174 vaccination teams operating across the region.

In March 2025, the Ministry of Health, in collaboration with UNICEF and the Government of Japan, launched a US$3.8 million initiative to enhance health and nutrition services for vulnerable populations in Gaza and the West Bank. This 12-month project aims to provide critical primary health care to approximately 180,000 children, women, and families. Key components include revitalizing primary health care services, improving antenatal and postnatal care, managing childhood illnesses, delivering essential nutrition interventions, training 300 health professionals, and establishing four mobile health teams to reach remote communities.

== List of ministers ==
The following is the list of health ministers of Palestine:

All-Palestine Government

#	Minister	Party	Government	Term start	Term end
1	Hussein Khalidi	Independent	All-Palestine	22 September 1948	1951

Government of Palestine

#	Minister	Party	Government	Term start	Term end
1	Riyad al-Zanoun	Fatah	1, 2, 3, 4	20 May 1994	29 October 2002
2	Ahmad al-Shibi	Fatah	5	29 October 2002	30 April 2003
3	Kamal al-Sharafi	Fatah	6	30 April 2003	7 October 2003
4	Jawad Tibi	Fatah	7, 8	7 October 2003	24 February 2005
5	Thehny al-Wahidi	Fatah	9	24 February 2005	29 March 2006
6	Basem Naim	Hamas	10	29 March 2006	17 March 2007
7	Radwan al-Akhras	Fatah	11	17 March 2007	14 June 2007
8	Fathi Abu Moghli	Independent	12, 13	14 June 2007	16 May 2012
9	Hani Abdeen	Fatah	14	16 May 2012	6 June 2013
10	Jawad Awad	Fatah	15, 16, 17	6 June 2013	13 April 2019
11	Mai al-Kaila	Fatah	18	13 April 2019	31 March 2024
12	Maged Abu Ramadan	Independent	19	31 March 2024	Incumbent

== See also ==
- Healthcare in Palestine
- List of hospitals in Palestine
