= Ministry of Foreign Affairs and Expatriates (Palestine) =

Government ministry of Palestine

Ministry of Foreign Affairs and Expatriates of Palestine
- وزارة الخارجية والمغتربين
- Seal of Palestine

Agency overview
- Formed: 1948 (first form); 2003 (second form)
- Jurisdiction: Government of Palestine
- Headquarters: Foreign Ministry Building, Ramallah, Palestine; 31°53′33.9554″N 35°11′23.0240″E
- Minister responsible: Varsen Aghabekian, Minister of Foreign Affairs and Expatriates
- Website: www.mofa.pna.ps

The Minister of Foreign Affairs of Palestine is the head of the government ministry in charge of Palestine's foreign relations. It was established on 30 April 2003 as a ministry within the Palestinian National Authority.

== History ==
Before the establishment of the standalone Ministry of Foreign Affairs on 30 April 2003, the Ministry of Planning and International Cooperation handled foreign affairs from 5 July 1994 to 30 April 2003 before it was split into the Ministry of Planning and the Ministry of International Cooperation, which in turn was renamed and established as the Ministry of Foreign Affairs. The Ministry of Planning was reestablished and renamed as the Ministry of Planning and International Cooperation on 31 March 2024 to handle the internal and external planning affairs of the Palestinian government and enhance cooperation with countries in various fields while the Ministry of Foreign Affairs and Expatriates handles diplomatic foreign relations with countries.

In June 2006, Israel attacked the Hamas' foreign ministry in Gaza, in response to the kidnapping of Gilad Shalit. The third and fourth floors of the building were destroyed, and the incident ended without fatalities.

== Diplomatic relations ==
Palestine maintains diplomatic relations with 136 countries. It operates 87 embassies, 14 general delegations, 3 consulates-general and 6 special missions: a mission to the United Nations (New York), a mission to the United Nations institutions in Geneva, a mission to the United Nations institutions in Paris, an ambassador to the European Union (Brussels), a mission to the Arab League institutions in Cairo and a mission to the Organisation of Islamic Cooperation in Jeddah.

== List of ministers ==
All-Palestine Government

No.	Portrait	Name (Birth–Death)	Term of office		Party	Government
1		Jamal al-Husayni (1894–1982)	22 September 1948	1953	Independent	All-Palestine

Government of Palestine

No.	Portrait	Name (Birth–Death)	Term of office		Party	Government
Minister of Planning and International Cooperation
1		Nabil Shaath (born 1938)	5 July 1994	30 April 2003	Fatah (PLO)	1, 2, 3, 4, 5
Minister of Foreign Affairs and Expatriates
1		Nabil Shaath (born 1938)	30 April 2003	24 February 2005	Fatah (PLO)	6, 7, 8
2		Nasser al-Qudwa (born 1953)	24 February 2005	29 March 2006	Fatah (PLO)	9
3		Mahmoud al-Zahar (born 1945)	29 March 2006	17 March 2007	Hamas	10
4		Ziad Abu Amr (born 1950)	17 March 2007	14 June 2007	Independent	11
5		Salam Fayyad (born 1952)	14 June 2007	19 May 2009	Third Way	12
6		Riyad al-Maliki (born 1955)	19 May 2009	31 March 2024	Independent	13, 14, 15, 16, 17, 18
7		Mohammad Mustafa (born 1954)	31 March 2024	23 June 2025	Independent	19
8		Varsen Aghabekian (born 1958)	23 June 2025	Incumbent	Independent	19

=== List of ministers of state ===
No.	Portrait	Name (Birth–Death)	Term of office		Party	Government
1		Varsen Aghabekian (born 1958)	31 March 2024	23 June 2025	Independent	19

== See also ==
- Foreign relations of Palestine
- International recognition of Palestine
