= Ministry of Planning and International Cooperation (Palestine) =

Government ministry of Palestine

- وزارة التخطيط والتعاون الدولي
- Seal of Palestine

Agency overview
- Formed: 1994
- Jurisdiction: Government of Palestine
- Headquarters: Ramallah, Palestine
- Minister responsible: Estephan Salameh, Minister of Planning and International Cooperation
- Website: mop.gov.ps/

The Ministry of Planning and International Cooperation is the branch of the Palestinian government that is responsible for cross-sector planning, developing comprehensive development policies with the participation of all relevant Palestinian institutions and to coordinate sector planning in specific ministries, to ensure their consistency with cross-sector approaches and plans. Any plan has to be approved by the Palestinian National Authority Cabinet and then ratified by the Palestinian Legislative Council. The ministry was established in 1994 as the Ministry of Planning and International Cooperation. The current ministry has a relatively minor position in Palestinian politics and a minister was not appointed by Mahmoud Abbas after the establishment of an emergency government in June 2007.

== List of ministers ==
No.	Name	Party	Government	Term start	Term end
Minister of Planning and International Cooperation
1	Nabil Shaath	Fatah	1, 2, 3, 4, 5	5 July 1994	30 April 2003
Minister of Planning
2	Nabeel Kassis	Independent	6	30 April 2003	7 October 2003
3	Salam Fayyad	Independent	7	7 October 2003	12 November 2003
(2)	Nabeel Kassis	Independent	8	12 November 2003	24 February 2005
4	Ghassan Khatib	Palestinian People's Party	9	24 February 2005	29 March 2006
5	Samir Abu Eisheh	Hamas	10, 11	29 March 2006	14 June 2007
6	Samir Abdullah	Independent	12	14 June 2007	19 May 2009
Minister of Planning and Administrative Development
7	Ali Jarbawi	Independent	13	19 May 2009	16 May 2012
Minister of State for Planning and Administrative Development
—	Mohammad Abu Ramadan	Independent	14, 15, 16	16 May 2012	2 June 2014
Minister of Finance and Planning
—	Shoukry Bishara	Independent	17, 18	2 June 2014	1 July 2019
Minister of Planning and International Cooperation
	Vacant		18	1 July 2019	31 March 2024
8	Wael Zaqout	Independent	19	31 March 2024	22 May 2025
—	Samah Hamad (Interim)	Independent	19	22 May 2025	23 June 2025
9	Estephan Salameh	Independent	19	23 June 2025	15 December 2025
Minister of Finance and Planning
—	Estephan Salameh	Independent	19	15 December 2025	Incumbent
