= Ministry of Finance (Palestine) =

Government ministry of Palestine

Ministry of Finance of Palestine
- وزارة المالية
- Seal of Palestine

Agency overview
- Formed: 1948 (first form); 1994 (second form)
- Jurisdiction: Government of Palestine
- Headquarters: Finance Ministry Building, Al-Bireh, Palestine
- Ministers responsible: Estephan Salameh, Minister of Finance and Planning; Majdi al-Hassan, Undersecretary of the Ministry of Finance
- Website: www.pmof.ps

The Minister of Finance (Arabic: وزارة المالية) is the head of the Government of Palestine's branch that is in charge of finance. The minister deals with launching audits, collecting tax from Palestinian businesses and overseeing financial aid directed to Palestine. Estephan Salameh is the current Minister of Finance and Planning.

In April 2007, it was reported that that branch was not receiving satisfactory amounts of money. It was estimated that the PNA gained only $40 million, while $160 million was the amount required.

== Functions ==
The Finance Minister is in charge of

- Controlling financial activities of the PNA and its expenditure.
- Supervising, studying and organizing monetary funds and the economic and political analysis of financial aid directed towards the PNA.
- Supervising and controlling the private capital funds of the PNA.
- Providing the money needed for facing the government's expenditures.
- Paying the salaries of government employees.
- Managing and settling employee salaries and retirement of civil administration and compensation in accordance with the laws and regulations in force.
- Scrutinizing and overseeing all financial transactions, including accounting principles adopted legally and that follow the principles of the Ministry for accountability and transparency during all stages of its work.
- Monitoring the implementation of the provisions of financial legislation in force.

== List of ministers ==
All-Palestine Government

#	Name	Party	Government	Term start	Term end	Notes
1	Michel Abikarios	Independent	All-Palestine	22 September 1948	1952	

Government of Palestine

#	Name	Party	Government	Term start	Term end	Notes
Minister of Finance
1	Mohammad Zuhdi Nashashibi	Fatah	1, 2, 3	5 July 1994	13 June 2002	
2	Salam Fayyad	Independent	4, 5, 6, 7, 8, 9	13 June 2002	19 November 2005	
–	Ahmed Qurei (interim)	Fatah	9	19 November 2005	29 March 2006	
3	Omar Abd al-Razaq	Hamas	10	29 March 2006	29 June 2006	
–	Yousef Rizqa (interim)	Hamas	10	29 June 2006	January 2007	
–	Samir Abu Eisheh (interim)	Hamas	10	January 2007	17 March 2007	
(2)	Salam Fayyad	Third Way	11, 12, 13	17 March 2007	16 May 2012	
4	Nabeel Kassis	Independent	14	16 May 2012	3 March 2013	
(2)	Salam Fayyad	Third Way	14	3 March 2013	6 June 2013	
5	Shoukry Bishara	Independent	15, 16	6 June 2013	2 June 2014	
Minister of Finance and Planning
5	Shoukry Bishara	Independent	17, 18	2 June 2014	1 July 2019	
Minister of Finance
5	Shoukry Bishara	Independent	18	1 July 2019	31 March 2024	
6	Omar al-Bitar	Independent	19	31 March 2024	9 November 2025	
7	Estephan Salameh	Independent	19	9 November 2025	15 December 2025	
Minister of Finance and Planning
7	Estephan Salameh	Independent	19	15 December 2025	Incumbent	

Hamas Government of the Gaza Strip

#	Name	Party	Term start	Term end	Notes
1	Ziyad al-Thatha	Hamas	14 June 2007	2 June 2014	

=== List of undersecretaries ===
#	Name	Party	Government	Term start	Term end	Notes
1	Majdi al-Hassan	Independent	19	26 March 2025	Incumbent	

== See also ==
- Interior Minister of the Palestinian National Authority
- Foreign Affairs Minister of the Palestinian National Authority
- Prime Minister of the Palestinian National Authority
