= First Fayyad Government =

Palestinian cabinet

Emergency Government of June and July 2007
- Date formed: 14 June 2007 (emergency); 13 July 2007 (regular)
- Date dissolved: 13 July 2007 (emergency); 19 May 2009 (regular)

People and organisations
- Head of state: Mahmoud Abbas
- Head of government: Salam Fayyad
- Total no. of members: 16
- Status in legislature: Caretaker government
- Opposition party: Hamas
- Opposition leader: Ismail Haniyeh

History
- Outgoing election: 2006 Palestinian legislative election
- Legislature term: 2006–2010
- Predecessor: National Unity Government 2007
- Successor: Second Fayyad Government

The Palestinian Authority Governments of June and July 2007, also known as First Fayyad Government, was a Palestinian Authority Government, formed shortly after Mahmoud Abbas, President of the Palestinian Authority, dismissed the previous government, led by Ismail Haniyeh of Hamas following the Hamas takeover of the Gaza Strip in June 2007. Abas appointed Salam Fayyad to lead an emergency cabinet established by presidential decree.

The government was formed on 14 June 2007, and was the first out of three governments led by Fayyad. Although widely supported by the international community, its creation was controversial as it was established under the Basic Law which requires the approval of the new government by Palestinian Legislative Council. President Abbas has enacted some articles of the Basic Law to allow cabinets to be sworn in with the approval of the PLC.

The Fayyad government was swiftly recognized by the international community as the legal government of the Palestinian Authority. Fayyad remained the Prime Minister of the Ramallah-based West Bank Governments, until he was replaced by Rami Hamdallah, who became Prime Minister of the Palestinian Authority Government of June 2013.

== Controversy ==
By presidential decree, President Abbas declared a state of emergency in June 2007, and dismissed Haniyeh-led 2007 National Unity Government, which included Abbas' Fatah faction and several other parties. Then, he appointed an emergency cabinet and suspended articles of the Basic Law, to circumvent the needed PLC approval.

Senior lawyers who wrote the Basic Law said that President Abbas exceeded his powers in appointing an emergency government to replace a Hamas-led cabinet without PLC approval. Although he had the power to dismiss Haniyeh as Prime Minister, the law did not grant him the power to appoint a new government without PLC approval nor the right to suspend articles of the Basic Law. Haniyeh's dismissed cabinet should have remained as caretaker administration until Abbas secured PLC approval for a new government. Moreover, a Presidential decree lasts 30 days, only extendable with PLC approval. Nathan Brown said: "These are absolutely and clearly black and white violations. He has no authority whatsoever to appoint an emergency government."

== Timeline ==
On 14 June 2007, President Abbas declared a state of emergency, dismissed the Hamas-led national unity PA government and Salam Fayyad was commissioned to form a caretaker government. Fayyad's 16-member emergency government (described as the 12th government) was installed on the same day. Only two members of the previous government, Fayyad himself and Khouloud Daibes, kept their portfolios in the new government.

The Fayyad government was immediately recognized by the international community as the legal Palestinian Authority government, The international community had boycotted the previous Hamas-led governments, and diverted international aid directly to Abbas or humanitarian aid organizations. Yet, they were prepared to work with the new PA Government.

According to a Human Rights Watch report, the Government ordered a boycott of the security, judicial and other government sectors in Gaza and ordered its employees to stay home from work if they wanted to get paid. President Abbas and Fatah supported Israel's Gaza border closures and restrictions on the supply of electricity and fuel. According to Palestinian security officials in the West Bank, Israel had since June 2007 assisted them in their common fight against Hamas. The cooperation with Israel generated a common view among Palestinians in the West Bank, that the forces under President Abbas are the “subcontractor of the occupation“. The Human Rights Watch report furthermore states that serious human rights abuses were committed by the new government, but also by the Hamas government in Gaza.

On 13 July 2007, the state of emergency expired in accordance with the Basic Law, and President Abbas issued a new decree to continue the state of emergency. The Fayyad government continued functioning as a caretaker government.

On 22 July 2007, Prime Minister Fayyad presented his government (described as the 13th government) for PLC approval. Fayyad also presented his government's principles and goals, and emphasized that his government would be based on inter alia the Arab Peace Initiative and ″all pertinent international resolutions″, and that the government would honour the agreements made with Israel. The second Fayyad government was identical to the first Fayyad government of 14 June. However, as the PLC quorum requirement could not be met, as Hamas members were boycotting the PLC, the approval was given in “extraordinary” session.

== Members of the Government ==
June to July 2007

	Minister	Office	Party
1	Salam Fayyad	Prime Minister, Foreign Affairs, Finance	Third Way
2	Abdel Razak al-Yehiyeh	Interior, Civil Affairs	Independent
3	Ziad al-Bandak	Local Government	Independent
4	Khouloud Daibes	Tourism, Women's Affairs	Independent
5	Kamal Hassouneh	Economy, Public Works, Telecommunications	Independent
6	Lamis al-Alami	Education	Independent
7	Samir Abdullah	Planning, Labor	Independent
8	Fathi Abu Maghli	Health	Independent
9	Riyad al-Malki	Information	Ex-PFLP
10	Jamal Bawatneh	Waqf	Independent
11	Mashhour Abu Daqqa	Transport	Independent
12	Ashraf al-Ajrami	Prisoners Affairs	Independent
13	Mahmoud Habbash	Agriculture, Social Affairs	Independent, Ex-Hamas
14	Ali Khashaan	Justice	Independent
15	Ibrahim Abrash	Culture	Independent
16	Tahani Abu Daqqa	Youth and Sports	Independent
17	Hikmat Zaid	Presidential Advisor for Governorate Affairs (Rank of Minister)	Fatah

== See also ==
- Palestinian government
- Hamas government of June 2007
