= Fourth Arafat Government =

Palestinian cabinet

Palestinian Authority Government of June 2002
- Date formed: 13 June 2002
- Date dissolved: 29 October 2002

People and organisations
- Head of state: Yasser Arafat
- Head of government: Yasser Arafat

History
- Predecessor: Third Arafat Government
- Successor: Palestinian Authority Government of October 2002

The Palestinian Authority Government of June 2002 was a government of the Palestinian National Authority (PA) from 13 June 2002 to 29 October 2002, headed by Yasser Arafat, the President of the Palestinian National Authority.

A number of Ministers resigned on 11 September 2002, facing a vote of no-confidence in the Palestinian Legislative Council (PNC). The next Government formed in October 2002 was largely the same as the June Government, except for six Ministers who had resigned.

== Background ==
Pursuant to the Oslo Accords, the authority of the PA Government is limited to some civil rights of the Palestinians in the West Bank Areas A and B and in the Gaza Strip, and to internal security in Area A and in Gaza.

While Israel since the signing of the Oslo Accords in 1993 continued establishing and expanding settlements throughout the Palestinian territories (including in Gaza until 2005) and refused to withdraw as stipulated in the Oslo Accords, President Arafat was reluctant to transfer power, and opposition was growing from within and outside his own party, Fatah.

After the collapse of the Israeli–Palestinian peace negotiations and the outbreak of the Second Intifada, in an Israeli military operation in April 2002, Israel re-occupied all West Bank areas set down for where the PA was supposed to exercise limited self-government (i.e., Area A and B). The Palestinian Authority infrastructure was largely destroyed and in June 2002, after further extensive destruction, President Arafat was held hostage in his Mukataa in Ramallah for the second time within a few months. In June 2002, the Israeli Government definitively approved construction of the West Bank barrier, largely built within the Palestinian territories and endangering the contiguity of the future Palestinian state.

== Timeline ==
=== Prelude to the Government ===
On 16 May 2002, the Palestinian Legislative Council (PLC) presented Arafat with a list of recommended changes to radically overhaul the way the Palestinian Authority operated. It demanded presidential and legislative elections within a year, and recommended that Arafat's current government resign and that Arafat appoint a smaller government within 45 days. It also called on him to sign the Basic Law. In his response, President Arafat said that no elections would be held until Israel fully withdrew from the Palestinian territories where the Oslo Accords called for full or partial control by the Palestinians (Areas A and B).

Since the establishment in 1996 of the first PA government approved by an elected PLC, there had not been rules about the term of the Government. Ministers were just appointed and dismissed by President Arafat, whose own term was the interim period of the Oslo Accords.

In 1997, the PLC approved the Basic Law, which was not signed by Arafat until 29 May 2002. This 2002 Basic Law stipulated that it only applied to the interim period set by the Oslo Accords. According to the Law, the Legislative Council (which should approve the Government) as well as the President of the Palestinian Authority (who should appoint the Ministers) were envisioned to function until the end of the interim period. The interim period had in fact ended on 5 July 1999.

=== Formation of the Cabinet ===
Early in June 2002, Arafat wanted to form a new, smaller Cabinet. He asked the Popular Front for the Liberation of Palestine, the Democratic Front for the Liberation of Palestine and Hamas to join the Government, but all refused. While Arafat was building a new Cabinet, the Israeli army raided Ramallah and started a new siege on Arafat's headquarters. On 11 June, the siege was strengthened, and the first meeting of the new Cabinet was cancelled.

=== End of the Cabinet ===
Members of Fatah demanded the dismissal of some Cabinet ministers seen as corrupt or incompetent. On 11 September 2002, Arafat would present a new Cabinet to Parliament for approval, but a group of Fatah lawmakers threatened to vote against the Cabinet, despite pressure by their leader. The Fatah representatives were willing to limit their vote to five new ministers only. As a compromise, Arafat issued a presidential decree for presidential and parliamentary elections in the West Bank, Gaza and Jerusalem to be held on 20 January 2003. As a consequence, the current Cabinet would only be a temporary one. Members of the Cabinet submitted their resignations and the vote on the new Cabinet that Arafat initially wanted to present was canceled. According to Palestinian Law, the PLC had to be dissolved 90 days before an election.

A reshuffled temporary cabinet was approved, with the intention to remain until new elections were held. Six ministers left the Government. The Interior, the Justice and the Health Ministers were replaced with new members. The total number of Ministries was decreased by one. The Telecommunication Ministry was merged with the Transportation Ministry of Mitri Abu Eita. The Ministries of Civil Affairs and of Youth and Sports were replaced with the two new Ministries Orient House Director and Prisoners Affairs.

The new elections, however, did not take place. The 2002 Cabinet functioned until the 2003 Basic Law came into force in March 2003 and the political system was changed. Also, the PLC was not dissolved.

== Members of the Government ==
13 June 2002 to 29 October 2002

	Minister	Office	Party
0	Yasser Arafat	President of the "Council of Ministers"; Awqaf and Religious Affairs	Fatah
1	Salam Fayyad	Finance	Independent
2	Abdel Razak al-Yehiyeh	Interior	Independent
3	Yasser Abed Rabbo	Culture and Information	Palestine Democratic Union
4	Nabil Shaath	Planning and International Cooperation	Fatah
5	Na'im Abu al-Hummus	Education and Higher Education	Fatah
6	Intissar al-Wazir	Social Affairs and Prisoners	Fatah
7	Nabeel Kassis	Tourism and Antiquities	Independent
8	Ibrahim Dughme	Justice	Independent
9	Saeb Erekat	Local Government	Fatah
10	Azzam al-Ahmad	Public Works and Housing	Fatah
11	Maher al-Masri	Economy, Trade and Industry	Fatah
12	Abdel Rahman Hamad	Natural Resources	Palestine Democratic Union
13	Imad Falougi	Communications	
14	Rafiq al-Natsheh	Agriculture	Fatah
15	Jamal Tarifi	Civil Affairs	Fatah
16	Riyad Za'noun	Health	Fatah
17	Ghassan Khatib	Labor	Palestinian People's Party
18	Mitri Abu Eita	Transportation	Fatah
19	Abdul Aziz Shahin	Supplies	Independent
20	Ali al-Qawasmi	Youth and Sports	Independent
* An additional waqf Minister was to be announced, but was apparently never appointed. A Waqf Minister did not appear in the next list of Cabinet members, nor in the list of leaving Ministers.

== See also ==
- Palestinian government
