= Ministry of Interior (Palestine) =

Government ministry of Palestine

Ministry of Interior and National Security
- وزارة الداخلية والأمن الوطني
- Seal of Palestine

Agency overview
- Formed: 1994
- Jurisdiction: Government of Palestine
- Headquarters: Ramallah, Palestine Other location: Abu Dis, Jerusalem Governorate, Palestine
- Minister responsible: Ziad Hab al-Rih, Minister of Interior and National Security

The Ministry of Interior and National Security is the branch of the Palestinian National Authority (PNA) cabinet in charge of the security and the statistics of the population of Palestine. Since Hamas' takeover of Gaza, the position of the Interior Ministry within the Palestinian Security Services is unclear.

== History ==
In 2006, the Israel Defense Forces struck the office building of the Interior Ministry multiple times as a part of a bombing campaign in Gaza. The attacks were in response to the kidnapping of Gilad Shalit, an Israeli soldier.

In June 2007, the office in Gaza was taken by Said Seyam as part of the Hamas government of June 2007. Hamas' takeover of Gaza left the Ramallah-based version of the Palestinian National Authority (PNA) as the Palestinian leadership in only the occupied West Bank and a Hamas-led government in control of the Gaza Strip.

Fathi Hamad took office in January 2009, following assassination of Said Seyam on 15 January 2009 during the 2008–2009 Gaza War. In August 2012, following government reshuffle by Prime Minister Ismail Haniyye, Fathi Hamad remained in position.

== Function ==
The ministry is in charge of the security and statistics of the people in the Gaza Strip.

The Interior Minister also leads the Hamas Public Affairs Department and is the director of Al-Aqsa TV, the Hamas-run television station.

== List of ministers ==
=== Interior Ministers of the Palestinian Authority ===
| # | Name | Party | Governments | Term start | Term end | Notes |
|---|---|---|---|---|---|---|
| 1 | Yasser Arafat | Fatah | 1, 2, 3 | 5 July 1994 | 13 June 2002 | Serving President |
| 2 | Abdel Razak al-Yehiyeh | PLO/Independent | 4 | 13 June 2002 | 29 October 2002 | |
| 3 | Hani al-Hassan | Fatah | 5 | 29 October 2002 | 30 April 2003 | |
| 4 | Mahmoud Abbas (Note: Mohammed Dahlan, former Preventive Security Director in the Gaza Strip became Minister of State for Security Affairs) | Fatah | 6 | 30 April 2003 | 6 September 2003 | Serving Prime Minister |
| — | Nasser Yousef (Note: Emergency government appointed by Presidential Decree) was nominated, but not appointed. (Note: Yousef refused to be sworn in without a vote of confidence from the PLC) | Fatah | 7 | 7 October 2003 | 12 November 2003 | |
| 5 | Hakam Balawi | Fatah | 7, 8 | 13 October 2003 (acting); 12 November 2003 | 12 November 2003 (acting); 24 February 2005 | |
| 6 | Nasser Yousef | Fatah | 9 | 24 February 2005 | 29 March 2006 | |
| 7 | Said Seyam | Hamas | 10 | 29 March 2006 | 17 March 2007 | |
| 8 | Hani Talab al-Qawasmi (Note: al-Qawasmi resigned on 23 April 2007 over lack of support for his reform plans for the security services.) | Hamas/Independent (unity government) | 11 | 17 March 2007 | 23 April 2007 | |
| 9 | Ismail Haniyeh | Hamas | 11 | 23 April 2007 | 14 June 2007 | Serving Prime Minister |
| (2) | Abdel Razak al-Yehiyeh | PLO/Independent | 12 | 15 June 2007 | 19 May 2009 | |
| 10 | Saeed Abu Ali | Fatah | 13, 14, 15, 16 | 19 May 2009 | 2 June 2014 | |
| 11 | Rami Hamdallah | Fatah/Independent (unity government) | 17 | 2 June 2014 | 14 April 2019 | Serving Prime Minister |
| 12 | Mohammad Shtayyeh | Fatah | 18 | 13 April 2019 | 1 January 2022 | Serving Prime Minister |
| 13 | Ziad Hab al-Rih | Fatah | 18, 19 | 1 January 2022 | Incumbent | |

=== Interior and National Security Ministers in the Gaza Strip ===
| # | Name | Party | Term start | Term end | Notes |
|---|---|---|---|---|---|
| 1 | Said Seyam | Hamas | 15 June 2007 | 15 January 2009 | |
| 2 | Fathi Hamad | Hamas | April 2009 | 2 June 2014 | |
| 3 | Mohammed Awad | Hamas | 2019 | Incumbent | |

== See also ==
- Palestinian Security Services
- Ministry of Foreign Affairs and Expatriates (Palestine)
- Ministry of Finance (Palestine)
