= Fifth Arafat Government =

Palestinian cabinet

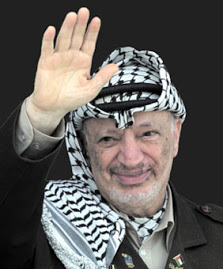
- Date formed: 29 October 2002
- Date dissolved: 30 April 2003

People and organisations
- Head of state: Yasser Arafat
- Head of government: Yasser Arafat
- Total no. of members: 6

History
- Predecessor: Palestinian Authority Government of June 2002
- Successor: Palestinian Authority Government of April 2003

The Palestinian Authority Government of October 2002 was a government of the Palestinian National Authority (PA) from 29 October 2002 to 30 April 2003, headed by Yasser Arafat, the President of the Palestinian National Authority. The Cabinet was largely equal to the June Government, from which six Ministers had resigned.

On 30 April 2003, the next Government led by Prime Minister Mahmoud Abbas was established.

== Powers and jurisdiction ==
Pursuant to the Oslo Accords, the authority of the PA Government was limited to some civil rights of the Palestinians in the West Bank Areas A and B and in the Gaza Strip, and to internal security in Area A and in Gaza.

== 2003 Basic Law changes ==
After the dismissal of the Government, no elections were held. On 18 March 2003, Arafat signed the 2003 Amended Basic Law, which transformed the political system into a semi-presidential one. The post of Prime Minister was created, who became responsible for the composition of the Cabinet and became the Chairman of the "Council of Ministers".

Mahmoud Abbas was named as the proposed first Prime Minister on 6 March 2003, and appointed on 19 March 2003. Abbas and his cabinet were approved by the Palestinian Legislative Council on 29 April and he became the head of the next Government on 30 April after being sworn in.

== Members of the Government ==
Index	Minister	Office	Party
0	Yasser Arafat	President of the "Council of Ministers"	Fatah
1	Salam Fayyad	Finance	Independent
2	Hani al-Hasan	Interior	Fatah
3	Yasser Abed Rabbo	Culture and Information	Palestine Democratic Union (FIDA)
4	Nabil Shaath	Planning and International Cooperation	Fatah
5	Na'im Abu al-Hummus	Education	Fatah
6	Intissar al-Wazir	Social Affairs	Fatah
7	Nabeel Kassis	Tourism and Antiquities	Independent
8	Zuhair Sourani	Justice	Independent
9	Saeb Erekat	Local Governance	Fatah
10	Azzam al-Ahmad	Public Works and Housing	Fatah
11	Maher al-Masri	Economy, Trade and Industry	Fatah
12	Abdel Rahman Hamad	Energy and Natural Resources	Fatah
13	Rafiq al-Natsheh	Agriculture	Fatah
14	Ahmad al-Shibi	Health	Fatah
15	Ghassan Khatib	Labor	Palestinian People's Party
16	Mitri Abu Eita	Transportation and Telecommunication	Independent
17	Abdul Aziz Shahin	Supply	Independent
18	Samir Ghosheh	Orient House Director	Independent
19	Hisham Abdul Razeq	Prisoners and Detainees Affairs	Fatah

== See also ==
- Palestinian government
