= Palestine Emergency Law =

The Palestine Emergency Law is an emergency law defined by Palestine in Article No. 110 of the amended Basic Law of 2003 AD, which is a law regulating the state of emergency, which is an exceptional system defined in time and space declared by the government, to meet emergency and unusual conditions that threaten the country or a part of it, through urgent measures and unusual methods under conditions Specific and until the threat is gone. A text that emphasizes the necessity and importance of defining the situation in space and time is always contained in international legislation related to this subject, and it is adhered to with strict conditions, to limit the abuse that customary, executive or administrative authorities may exercise against this situation.

== Working periods ==
- The late President Yasser Arafat. issued the first political decree to declare a state of emergency in the Palestinian territories on 5/10/2003, where an emergency government was formed headed by Ahmed Qurei and the membership of eight other ministers, most notably Nasr Youssef as Minister of Interior, Salam Fayyad, Minister of Finance and Nabeel Shaath, Minister of Foreign Affairs.
- The second decree of the declaration of the state of emergency was issued in 2007 and the decree included "declaring a state of emergency in all Palestinian lands, due to the crimes committed in Gaza, the seizure of the headquarters of the authority and the military coup, and the competent authorities should implement the decision."
- On 3/3/2020, Palestinian President Mahmoud Abbas decided to declare a state of emergency for a month, to confront the COVID-19 pandemic in the State of Palestine. After that, the state of emergency was extended more than 10 times.

=== Chronology of constitutional developments related to the state of emergency in Palestine in 2020 ===
A chronology of constitutional developments related to the state of emergency in Palestine in the year 2020, in light of the risk posed by the spread of the COVID-19 epidemic. Since the declaration of the emergency for the first time on March 5, many measures and measures have been taken, including a set of decisions by law, decisions issued by the Prime Minister, decrees and others that were published in the Official Gazette.
