= Second and Third Fayyad Governments =

Palestinian cabinet

- Date formed: 19 May 2009 (Second); 16 May 2012 (Third)
- Date dissolved: 16 May 2012 (Second); 6 June 2013 (Third)

People and organisations
- Head of state: Mahmoud Abbas
- Head of government: Salam Fayyad

History
- Predecessor: First Fayyad Government
- Successor: First and Second Hamdallah Governments

The Second and Third Fayyad Governments or the Palestinian Government of May 2009 was a Palestinian government of the Palestinian National Authority led by Salam Fayyad from 19 May 2009 to 6 June 2013. Fayyad had been Prime Minister of the First Fayyad Government of June 2007.

The Fayyad Government was the de jure government in the Palestinian Authority, though its control was confined to the West Bank Areas A and B, whereas Hamas formed the de facto Government in the Gaza Strip.

The Second Fayyad Government comprised somewhere between 20 and 22 members depending on the consulted source. It resigned in February 2011, however due to disagreements of how to proceed, Fayyad continued to preside over a caretaker government.

Following the February 2012 Doha agreement and the successive May 2012 Cairo accord, which also failed to be implemented, Mahmoud Abbas asked Fayyad to form a new Cabinet, without Hamas' involvement. On 16 May 2012, a reshuffled Cabinet was formed, creating the Third Fayyad Government. Fayyad gave up his post as Finance Minister in favour of Nabeel Kassis. The PA faced an estimated financing gap of about $500 million. The government expanded to 25 members, with 11 new faces.

In 2013, the Fayyad government was succeeded by the Palestinian governments of 2013 led by Rami Hamdallah.

== Powers and jurisdiction ==
Pursuant to the Oslo Accords, the authority of the PA Government was limited to some civil rights of the Palestinians in the West Bank Areas A and B and in the Gaza Strip, and to internal security in Area A and in Gaza.

The Fayyad Government was the de jure government in the Palestinian Authority, though its control was confined to the West Bank Areas A and B, while Hamas formed the de facto Government in the Gaza Strip.

== Formation ==
Most of the ministers were members of Fatah, although the Cabinet also included independents and members of third parties.

The Government was appointed by presidential decree and lacked the approval of the Palestinian Legislative Council as required pursuant the Palestinian Basic Law. The opposition of the Hamas majority alone was enough to withhold the new government its legal basis, but even Fatah's parliamentary bloc did not endorse the government. Two PLC members refused to join the government when the Fatah bloc decided not to back the new Fayyad cabinet. For the international community, this was not a reason to question the legality of the Government.

== Members of the Government ==
=== Second Government ===
May 2009 to May 2012

	Minister	Office	Party
1	Salam Fayyad	Prime Minister, Finance	Third Way/Independent
2	Said Abu Ali	Interior	Fatah
3	Riyad al-Malki	Foreign Affairs Minister	Ex-PFLP
4	Khaled al-Qawasmi	Local Government	Independent
5	Sa'adi al-Krunz	Transportation	Fatah
6	Ismail Deiq (Ismail Daik, Ismail Du’ieq)	Agriculture	Independent
7	Bassem Khoury	Economy	Fatah
8	Ali al-Jarbawi	Planning and Development	Independent
9	Rabiha Diab *	Women's Affairs	Fatah
10	Majda al-Masri	Social Affairs	DFLP
11	Ahmad al-Majdalani	Labor	PPSF
12	Mahmoud al-Habbash	Waqf and Religious Affairs	Independent
13	Khuloud Deibes	Tourism	Independent
14	Ali Khashan	Justice	Independent
15	Fathi Abu Moghli	Health	Independent
16	Mashhour Abu Daqqa	Telecommunications	Independent
17	Lamis al-Alami	Education	Independent
18	Issa Qaraqe **	Prisoners' Affairs	Independent
19	Maher Ghneim	Minister of State	Fatah
20	Hassan Abu Libdeh ***	Secretary-General of the Cabinet (Rank of Minister)	Fatah
21	Hatem Abdul Qader ****	Minister of State for Jerusalem Affairs	Fatah
22	Mohammad Shtayyeh ****	Public Works and Housing	Fatah
* Palestine UN Observer lists Rabiha Ziab [sic] as Minister of Women's Affairs; Ma'an writes that Diab refused, and lists Siham al-Barghouthi (Fida) ** Mentioned by Palestine UN Observer. Ma'an writes that Qaraqe refused. However, he held the position in the next cabinets *** Palestine UN Observer lists Libdeh as Minister of National Economy **** Mentioned by Ma'an

=== Third Government ===
May 2012 to June 2013

	Minister	Office	Party
1	Salam Fayyad	Prime Minister	Third Way/Independent
2	Said Abu Ali	Interior	Fatah
3	Riyad al-Malki	Foreign Affairs Minister	Ex-PFLP
4	Khaled al-Qawasmi	Local Government	Independent
5	Unknown	Transportation	
6	Unknown	Agriculture	
7	Unknown	Economy	
8	Mohammad Abu Ramadan	Planning and Development	
9	Rabiha Diab	Women's Affairs	
10	Unknown	Social Affairs	
11	Ahmad al-Majdalani	Labor	PPSF
12	Mahmoud al-Habbash	Waqf and Religious Affairs	Independent
13	Rula Maayah	Tourism	Fatah
14	Ali Mhanna	Justice	
15	Hani Abdin	Health	Fatah
16	Unknown	Telecommunications	
17	Lamis al-Alami	Education	Independent
18	Issa Qaraqe	Prisoners' Affairs	Independent
19	Unknown	Minister of State	
20	Unknown	Secretary-General of the Cabinet (Rank of Minister)	
21	Adnan Husseini	Jerusalem Affairs	
22	Unknown	Public Works and Housing	
23	Nabil Qasis	Finance	Independent
24	Siham Barghuti	Culture	
25	Yussef Abu Safiya	Environment	

== See also ==
- Palestinian government
