= Ministry of Education and Higher Education (Palestine) =

Government ministry of Palestine

- Seal of Palestine

Agency overview
- Formed: 1948 (first form); 1994 (second form)
- Jurisdiction: State of Palestine
- Headquarters: Ramallah, Palestine
- Minister responsible: Amjad Barham, Minister of Education and Higher Education

The Ministry of Education and Higher Education is the branch of the Palestinian government in charge of managing the education in Palestine. It was established in 1994 after the formation of the Palestinian National Authority.

Nasser al-Shaer, the former Minister of Education, was arrested by Israeli authorities twice for membership in Hamas and released both times. After the Hamas takeover of the Gaza Strip in June 2007, President Mahmoud Abbas dismissed all Hamas ministers including Shaer.

Marwan Awartani was appointed minister in 2019 and served from April 14, 2019 until his resignation was accepted on September 3, 2023.

== Activities ==
Throughout 2001–2005, the ministry finalized the establishment of a Palestinian national curriculum by hiring teachers and providing classrooms and books.

The five programs of the plan were:

1. Education as a human right Aim to provide an opportunity for all children from kindergarten to secondary school, by recruiting new teachers, adding new classrooms, textbooks, increasing the level of enrollment in the secondary stage, and decreasing the dropout rate.
2. Education as the basic component of citizenship Developing quality education is the production, assessment, evaluation, and enrichment of school textbooks and instruction manuals for the Palestinian Curriculum as well as teacher and supervisor training.
3. Education as a tool for social and economic development Developing a vocational and technical training program aiming to meet the basic needs of the local market, and providing a skilled workforce that can contribute positively to the national economy. Providing schools with the necessary equipment and resources.
4. Education as a tool for social and economic development Developing new programs for general education, pre-school, informal education, adult education, and special education, that is available for the general population.
5. Education as a continuous, renewable, participatory process Restructuring the financial and administrative systems to ensure efficient use of available resources. The program will include the school-map project, as well as reinforce concepts of strategic planning and organizational administration. Also, developing and reviewing policies, and rules and regulations; updating of position responsibilities and job descriptions; and developing relations between schools and the local community.

Other activities are training and providing income for teachers, increasing the quality of school technology as well as expanding and building new schools.

The K12 educational system is divided into the First Stage of Basic Education (Preparation Stage; grades 1–4), the Second Stage of Basic Education (Empowerment Stage; grades 5–9); and Secondary Stage (Acquisition Stage; grades 10–12. In grade 11, students can opt for a literary stream focused on languages and social science, or a scientific stream focuses on subjects such as physics, chemistry, and mathematics. Grades 1–10 are compulsory, according to the Palestinian Educational Law (Ministry of Education and Higher Education, 2017).

According to a Palestinian Central Bureau of Statistics (2021), there are 1,309,000 school students in grades K-12 across the West Bank, Gaza, and East Jerusalem.

The Ministry of Education’s strategic plan of 2017-2022 states the goal of K12 education as “a Palestinian society that possess the culture, values, skills, science and technology to produce new knowledge and leverage it in development and liberation.”

In 2007, when Hamas led the Ministry of Education as part of power sharing agreement with Fatah, the ministry confiscated around 1,500 copies of the book Speak Bird, Speak Again. from public school libraries in Gaza and the West Bank. Hamas suppressed this book of folk tales, which featured the female oral tradition of Palestinian hikaye, from public school libraries on the grounds that the stories used colloquial and sometimes offensive language that was unsuitable for teaching children. However, after a storm of public outrage, this decision was soon withdrawn.

Taking advantages of teachers’ strikes in 2008, Hamas “implemented a gradual takeover of the Ministry of Education,” by hiring and appointing teachers and administrators who were Hamas members or sympathizers, thus paving the way for increased Islamic influence in schools, particularly in Gaza.

In 2013, at a time when the Hamas-run ministry of education in Gaza was operating independently of the PA-run ministry in the West Bank, schools in Gaza introduced new textbooks as part of a “patriotic education” program.

== List of ministers ==
All-Palestine Government

#	Minister	Party	Governments	Term start	Term end	Notes
Minister of Education
1	Muhammad Ali Saleh	Independent	All-Palestine	22 September 1948	1952	

Government of Palestine

#	Minister	Party	Governments	Term start	Term end	Notes
Minister of Education and Higher Education
1	Yasser Amr	Independent	1	20 May 1994	17 May 1996	
Minister of Education
2	Yasser Arafat	Fatah	2, 3	17 May 1996	13 June 2002	Serving President
Minister of Education and Higher Education
3	Naim Abu al-Hummus	Fatah	4, 5, 6, 7, 8, 9	13 June 2002	29 March 2006	
4	Nasser al-Shaer	Hamas	10, 11	29 March 2006	14 June 2007	Serving Deputy Prime Minister
5	Lamis al-Alami	Independent	12, 13	14 June 2007	16 May 2012	
Minister of Education
5	Lamis al-Alami	Independent	14	16 May 2012	6 June 2013	
Minister of Education and Higher Education
6	Ali Abu Zuhri	Independent	15, 16	6 June 2013	2 June 2014	
7	Khawla Shakhshir	Independent	17	2 June 2014	30 June 2015	
8	Sabri Saidam	Independent	17	30 June 2015	13 April 2019	
Minister of Education
9	Marwan Awartani	Independent	18	13 April 2019	3 September 2023	
10	Mahmoud Abu Muwais	Independent	18	3 September 2023	31 March 2024	
Minister of Education and Higher Education
11	Amjad Barham	Independent	19	31 March 2024	Incumbent	
