= Omar Abd al-Razaq =

Palestinian politician

Omar Abdul Razaq
- عمر عبد الرزاق

Minister of Finance
- In office 29 March 2006 – 29 June 2006
- President: Mahmoud Abbas
- Prime Minister: Ismail Haniyeh
- Preceded by: Ahmed Qurei (acting)
- Succeeded by: Yousef Rizqa (acting)

Personal details
- Born: 7 March 1958 (age 68) Salfit, Jordanian-administered West Bank, Palestine
- Party: Hamas
- Education: Coe College; University of Iowa
- Occupation: Politician, professor

Omar Abdul Razaq, or Umar Abed al-Razek (Arabic: عمر عبد الرزاق; born 7 March 1958), is a Palestinian politician and professor. He served as the Minister of Finance in the First Haniyeh Government. He represents the Hamas organization, and was arrested by Israel on 29 June 2006 and freed in 2008. He is a professor and researcher in the Department of Economics at An-Najah National University.

Political offices
Preceded by Ahmed Qurei; Acting	Minister of Finance; 2006	Succeeded by Yousef Rizqa; Acting
