= Second Qurei Government =

Palestinian cabinet

- Date formed: 12 November 2003
- Date dissolved: 24 February 2005

People and organisations
- Head of state: Yasser Arafat (until 11 November 2004); Rawhi Fattouh (acting, 11 November 2004 – 15 January 2005); Mahmoud Abbas (starting 15 January 2005)
- Head of government: Ahmed Qurei
- No. of ministers: 24

History
- Predecessor: First Qurei Government
- Successor: Palestinian Authority Government of February 2005

The Palestinian Authority Government of November 2003 was a government of the Palestinian National Authority (PA) sworn in on 12 November 2003 and continued until 24 February 2005. It was headed by Ahmed Qurei, the Prime Minister of the Palestinian National Authority. The new 24-member Cabinet was approved by Palestinian Legislative Council on 12 November with 46 votes to 13, and 5 abstentions.

== Background ==
Pursuant to the Oslo Accords and the Gaza–Jericho Agreement, the Palestinian Authority had limited powers to some civil rights of the Palestinians in the West Bank Areas A and B and in the Gaza Strip, and to internal security in Area A and in Gaza.

On 6 September 2003, Mahmoud Abbas resigned as Prime Minister and President Arafat asked Ahmed Qurei to become PM of an emergency government. Following a suicide bombing in Haifa on 4 October, Israel threatened to "remove" Arafat and urged him to act within 48 hours.

The next day, on 5 October 2003, Arafat installed, by presidential decree, an eight-member emergency government headed by Qurei. Arafat and Qurei disagreed as to who was to be Interior Minister in the next government. Qurei wanted General Nasser Yousef, while Arafat preferred Hakam Balawi. On 4 November, the term of the emergency cabinet expired. Hours before the 30-day term expired at midnight, Arafat transformed the Cabinet into a caretaker government.

== Timeline ==
On 12 November 2003, a new 24-member government was presented to the Palestinian Legislative Council and approved with 46 votes to 13, and 5 abstentions. Balawi was Interior Minister.

On 17 July 2004, Qurei submitted his resignation amid growing chaos in the Gaza Strip. Offices of the Palestinian authority in Gaza were burned down, and gunmen briefly abducted four French aid workers, the police chief and another official, demanding reforms. Arafat refused to accept Qurei's resignation. Arafat and Qurei disagreed on Qurei's demand for more authority to restructure and control the Palestinian Security Services to reduce the growing turmoil. Denying the demand, Arafat decreed a state of emergency in Gaza, and Qurei retracted his resignation. On 27 July, Arafat and Qurei held a press conference after reaching a settlement in a cabinet meeting.

After Arafat's death in November 2004 and Mahmoud Abbas' subsequent victory in the Palestinian presidential election in January 2005, Qurei was asked to continue in his post as caretaker prime minister and form a new government. The next government was formed on 24 February 2005, also headed by Qurei.

== Members of the Government ==
November 2003 to February 2005

	Minister	Office	Party
1	Ahmed Qurei	Prime Minister/Religious Affairs	Fatah
2	Nabil Sha'ath	Foreign Affairs	Fatah
3	Salam Fayyad	Finance	Independent
4	Hakam Balawi	Interior	Fatah
5	Jawad Tibi	Health	Fatah
6	Maher al-Masri	Economy	Fatah
7	Intissar al-Wazir	Social Affairs	Fatah
8	Hisham Abdel Razeq	Prisoners Affairs	Fatah
9	Na'im Abu al-Hummus	Education	Fatah
10	Zahira Kamal	Woman Affairs	Palestine Democratic Union
11	Nahed al-Rayyes	Justice	Fatah
12	Azzam al-Ahmad	Telecommunications and Information Technology	Fatah
13	Abdul Rahman Hamad	Public Works	Independent
14	Mitri Abu Eideh	Tourism	Independent
15	Yahya Yakhlof	Culture	Fatah
16	Hikmat Zaid	Transportation	Fatah
17	Saeb Erekat	Negotiations Affairs	Fatah
18	Nabeel Kassis	Planning	Fatah
19	Rawhi Fattuh	Agriculture	Fatah
20	Salah Ta'amari	Youth and Sports	Fatah
21	Jamal Shobaki	Local Governance	Fatah
22	Jamal Tarifi	Civil Affairs	Fatah
23	Ghassan Khatib	Labor	Palestinian People's Party
24	Qadura Fares	State	Fatah

== See also ==
- Palestinian government
