= Second Arafat Government =

Palestinian cabinet

Palestinian Authority Government of 1996
- 2nd Cabinet of Palestinian National Authority
- Date formed: 17 May 1996
- Date dissolved: 9 August 1998

People and organisations
- Head of government: Yasser Arafat
- Status in legislature: Approved by the Palestinian Legislative Council

History
- Election: 1996 Palestinian general election
- Predecessor: First Arafat Government
- Successor: Third Arafat Government

The Palestinian Authority Government of 1996 was a government of the Palestinian National Authority (PA) formed following the first general elections held on 20 January 1996 in the Palestinian territories after the conclusion of the Oslo Accords in 1993. The general election was for the President of the PA and for members of the Palestinian Legislative Council (PLC). The Government was headed by Chairman of the PLO, Yasser Arafat, and functioned in varying forms until the appointment of the Abbas Government on 29 April 2003. The Government was approved by the PLC, but there were no rules as to the term of the Government. Ministers were just appointed and dismissed by Arafat.

The government was chosen and appointed by PA President Arafat, and Arafat also presided at meetings of the "Council of Ministers".

== Powers and jurisdiction ==
Pursuant to the Oslo Accords, the PA Government had only authority over some civil rights of the Palestinians in the West Bank Areas A and B and in the Gaza Strip, and over internal security in Area A and in Gaza. One of the security tasks was the security cooperation between Israel and the Palestinian Authority, which inter alia aimed at the prevention of Palestinian attacks on the Israeli army and settlers.

In 1997, the Palestinian Legislative Council approved the Basic Law, which was not signed by Arafat until 29 May 2002. This 2002 Basic Law stipulated that it only applied to the interim period set by the Oslo Accords. According to the Law, the Legislative Council (which should approve the Government) as well as the President of the Palestinian Authority (who should appoint the Ministers) were envisioned to function until the end of the interim period. The interim period had in fact ended on 5 July 1999.

== Members of the Government ==
#	Name	Image	Ministerial Portfolio	Party	Notes
1	Yasser Arafat		President of the Palestinian National Authority and Minister of Interior and Minister of Education	Fatah	Chairman of the PLO Executive Committee from the previous government
2	Maher al-Masri		Minister of Economy and Trade	Fatah	Member of the First Palestinian Legislative Council for Nablus
3	Nabil Ali Rashid Shaath		Minister of Planning and International Cooperation	Fatah	Member of the First Palestinian Legislative Council for Khan Yunis from the previous government
4	Saeb Mohammed Saleh Erekat		Minister of Local Government	Fatah	Member of the First Palestinian Legislative Council for Jericho from the previous government
5	Riyadh al-Zanoun		Minister of Health	Fatah	Member of the First Palestinian Legislative Council for Gaza from the previous government
6	Fareeh Abu Madin		Minister of Justice	Fatah	Member of the First Palestinian Legislative Council for Deir al-Balah from the previous government
7	Jamil al-Tarifi		Minister of Civil Affairs	Fatah	Member of the First Palestinian Legislative Council for Ramallah and al-Bireh from the previous government
8	Abdul Aziz Shaheen		Minister of Supply	Fatah	Member of the First Palestinian Legislative Council for Rafah from the previous government
9	Intissar Mustafa Mahmoud al-Wazir		Minister of Social Affairs	Fatah	Member of the First Palestinian Legislative Council for Gaza from the previous government
10	Yasser Abdul Majid Adib Abed Rabbo		Minister of Culture and Information	FIDA Party	Member of the PLO Executive Committee from the previous government
11	Talal Sidr		Minister of Youth and Sports	Independent	
12	Samir Ghawshah		Minister of Labour	Palestinian Popular Struggle Front	Member of the PLO Executive Committee from the previous government
13	Mohammad Zuhdi Nashashibi		Minister of Finance	Independent	Member of the PLO Executive Committee from the previous government
14	Hanan Ashrawi		Minister of Higher Education	Independent	Member of the First Palestinian Legislative Council for Jerusalem
15	Ali al-Qawasmi		Minister of Transport	Fatah	Member of the First Palestinian Legislative Council for Hebron
16	Imad al-Falouji		Minister of Telecommunications	Independent	Member of the First Palestinian Legislative Council for North Gaza
17	Elias Freij		Minister of Tourism	Independent	from the previous government
18	Hasan Tahboub		Minister of Waqf and Religious Affairs	Independent	from the previous government
19	Azzam Najeeb Mustafa al-Ahmad		Minister of Public Works	Fatah	Member of the First Palestinian Legislative Council for Jenin
20	Abdulrahman Hamad		Minister of Housing	Fatah	Member of the First Palestinian Legislative Council for North Gaza
21	Faisal Husseini		Minister of Jerusalem Affairs	Fatah	Member of the PLO Executive Committee
22	Bashir Barghouti		Minister of Industry	Palestinian People's Party	
23	Abd al-Gawad Saleh		Minister of Agriculture	Independent	Member of the First Palestinian Legislative Council for Ramallah and al-Bireh
24	Ahmad Abdel Rahman		Secretary General of the Cabinet	Fatah	
