= Mustafa Government =

Incumbent Government of Palestine

Muhammad Mustafa Government
- 19th Cabinet of Palestine
- Incumbent
- Date formed: 31 March 2024

People and organisations
- Head of state: Mahmoud Abbas
- Head of government: Muhammad Mustafa
- No. of ministers: 23

History
- Predecessor: Shtayyeh Government

The Muhammad Mustafa government is the nineteenth government of the State of Palestine. Muhammad Mustafa was officially assigned to form the new government on 14 March 2024 as a result of the resignation of the Muhammad Shtayyeh government on 26 February 2024, as Shtayyeh announced that his government had placed its resignation at the disposal of Palestinian President Mahmoud Abbas since 20 February 2024. On 26 February 2024, President Abbas accepted the government's resignation and appointed it to temporarily conduct government affairs until a new government could be formed.

On 14 March 2024, Muhammad Mustafa was assigned by President Abbas to form a "government of technocrats." On 28 March 2024, Mustafa presented his government to President Abbas, who approved the new government the same day. Muhammad Mustafa and his appointed ministers were sworn in on 31 March 2024.

== Members of the Government ==
=== Members of the Council of Ministers ===
	Office	Portrait	Minister	Took office	Left office	Party
1	Prime Minister		Muhammad Abdullah Muhammad Mustafa	31 March 2024	Incumbent	Independent
2	Minister of Foreign Affairs and Expatriates		Muhammad Abdullah Muhammad Mustafa	31 March 2024	23 June 2025	Independent
2	Minister of Foreign Affairs and Expatriates		Farsin Ohanes Vartan Aghabikan	23 June 2025	Incumbent	Independent
3	Minister of Justice		Sharhabeel Youssef Saad al-Din al-Zaim	31 March 2024	Incumbent	Independent
4	Minister of Interior		Ziad Mahmoud Muhammad Hab al-Rih	31 March 2024	Incumbent	Fatah
5	Minister of Finance		Omar Akram Omran al-Bitar	31 March 2024	9 November 2025	Independent
5	Minister of Finance		Estephan Salameh	9 November 2025	Incumbent	Independent
6	Minister of Planning and International Cooperation		Wael Muhammad Mahmoud Zaqout	31 March 2024	22 May 2025	Independent
6	Minister of Planning and International Cooperation		Samah Abdul Rahim Hussein Abu Aoun (Interim)	22 May 2025	23 June 2025	Independent
6	Minister of Planning and International Cooperation		Estephan Salameh	23 June 2025	Incumbent	Independent
7	Minister of Local Government		Sami Ahmed Arif Hijjawi	31 March 2024	Incumbent	Independent
8	Minister of Health		Majid Awni Muhammad Abu Ramadan	31 March 2024	Incumbent	Independent
9	Minister of Education and Higher Education		Amjad Saad Suleiman Barham	31 March 2024	Incumbent	Independent
10	Minister of Labor		Enas Hosni Abdel Ghani Attari	31 March 2024	Incumbent	Independent
11	Minister of Awqaf and Religious Affairs		Muhammad Mustafa Muhammad Najm	31 March 2024	15 October 2026	Independent
11	Minister of Awqaf and Religious Affairs		Sharhabeel Youssef Saad al-Din al-Zaim	19 October 2026	Incumbent	Independent
12	Minister of Industry		Arafat Hussein Suleiman Asfour	31 March 2024	Incumbent	Independent
13	Minister of National Economy		Muhammad Youssef Muhammad al-Amour	31 March 2024	Incumbent	Independent
14	Minister of Telecommunications and Digital Economy		Abdel Razek Maher Abdel Razek Natsheh	31 March 2024	Incumbent	Independent
15	Minister of Public Works and Housing		Ahed Faeq Atef Bseiso	31 March 2024	Incumbent	Independent
16	Minister of Social Development		Samah Abdul Rahim Hussein Abu Aoun	31 March 2024	Incumbent	Independent
17	Minister of Agriculture		Rizq Abdul Rahman Salem Salimiya	31 March 2024	Incumbent	Independent
18	Minister of Tourism and Antiquities		Hani Naji Atallah al-Hayek	31 March 2024	Incumbent	Fatah
19	Minister of Jerusalem Affairs		Ashraf Hassan Abbas al-Awar	31 March 2024	Incumbent	Independent
20	Minister of Culture		Imad al-Din Abdullah Salim Hamdan	31 March 2024	Incumbent	Independent
21	Minister of Transport and Communications		Tariq Hosni Salem Zorob	31 March 2024	4 October 2025	Fatah
21	Minister of Transport and Communications		Ahed Faeq Atef Bseiso (Interim)	4 October 2025	15 November 2025	Independent
21	Minister of Transport and Communications		Mohammed al-Ahmad	15 November 2025	Incumbent	Independent
22	Minister of Women's Affairs		Mona Muhammad Mahmoud al-Khalili	31 March 2024	Incumbent	Independent
23	Minister of State for Foreign and Expatriate Affairs		Farsin Ohanes Vartan Aghabikan	31 March 2024	23 June 2025	Independent
24	Minister of State for Relief Affairs		Basil Abdel Rahman Hassan al-Kafarneh	31 March 2024	20 January 2025	Independent
24	Minister of State for Relief Affairs		Samah Abdul Rahim Hussein Abu Aoun (Interim)	20 January 2025	Incumbent	Independent
	General Secretariat of the Council of Ministers		Dawas Tayseer Rasheed Dawas	31 March 2024	Incumbent	Independent
	Government Spokesperson		Muhammad Abu al-Rub	31 March 2024	Incumbent	Independent
