= Joudeh George Murqos =

Palestinian politician

Joudeh George Joudeh Murqos

Minister of Tourism of Palestine

Joudeh George Joudeh Murqos (Arabic: جودة جورج جودة مرقص; born March 1, 1959) was the Palestinian minister of tourism in the First Haniyeh Government (2006–2007). He was the only Christian minister of the government.

== See also ==
- Palestinian government of March 2006
- Palestinian Christians
