= Estephan Salameh =

Palestinian economist

- اسطفان سلامة
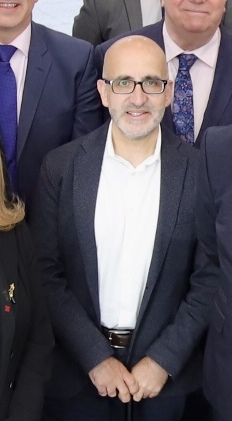
- Salameh in 2025

Minister of Finance and Planning
- Incumbent
- Assumed office 15 December 2025
- Prime Minister: Mohammad Mustafa
- Preceded by: Himself (as Minister of Finance); Himself (as Minister of Planning and International Cooperation)

Minister of Finance
- In office 9 November 2025 – 15 December 2025
- Prime Minister: Mohammad Mustafa
- Preceded by: Omar al-Bitar
- Succeeded by: Himself (as Minister of Finance and Planning)

Minister of Planning and International Cooperation
- In office 23 June 2025 – 15 December 2025
- Prime Minister: Mohammad Mustafa
- Preceded by: Samah Hamad (Interim)
- Succeeded by: Himself (as Minister of Finance and Planning)

Personal details
- Born: Estephan Anton Salameh
- Party: Independent
- Education: Birzeit University; University of Illinois Chicago
- Occupation: Politician, economist

Estephan Anton Salameh (Arabic: اسطيفان أنطون سلامة) is a Palestinian politician serving as Minister of Finance and Planning in the Mustafa Government. He is also a member of the board of trustees at Bethlehem University.

== Political career ==
Salameh obtained a PhD in public policy and planning from the University of Illinois. From 2017 to 2022, he led the Palestinian planning team responsible for developing the Palestinian National Policy Agenda and sector strategies. During his tenure with the Palestinian Authority (PA), Dr Salameh also served as a Policy Advisor and led the Aid Management and Coordination Directorate, managing relationships with more than 80 international donor agencies. He also co-founded the Seraj Library Project.

In an interview with Euronews in November 2025, Salameh denied that the PA continued to use EU funds for the "Martyrs Fund" which had ended in February.

Salameh also visited Singapore in February 2026.

Political offices
| Preceded by Samah Hamad; Interim | Minister of Planning and International Cooperation; 2025 | Succeeded by Himself as Minister of Finance and Planning |
| Preceded by Omar al-Bitar | Minister of Finance; 2025 | Succeeded by Himself as Minister of Finance and Planning |
| Preceded by Himself as Minister of Finance and Minister of Planning and International Cooperation | Minister of Finance and Planning; 2025–present | Incumbent |
