= Shtayyeh Government =

Cabinet

Mohammad Shtayyeh Government
- Date formed: 13 April 2019
- Date dissolved: 31 March 2024

People and organisations
- Head of state: Mahmoud Abbas
- Head of government: Mohammad Shtayyeh

History
- Predecessor: Third Hamdallah Government
- Successor: Mustafa Government

The Mohammad Shtayyeh Government or State of Palestine Government of April 2019 was the eighteenth Palestinian government. Mohammad Shtayyeh was assigned to formally form it on 10 March 2019, after the resignation of Palestinian Unity Government of June 2014. The government was sworn in on 13 April 2019 in front of the President of the State of Palestine Mahmoud Abbas, and lasted until March 31, 2024, when the Mustafa Government was sworn in.

== History ==
On 29 January 2019, the Third Hamdallah Government submitted its resignation to President Mahmoud Abbas, who accepted it and tasked it with running the affairs until the formation of a new government.

On 10 March 2019, President Abbas appointed Mohammad Shtayyeh as Prime Minister, and tasked him with forming the eighteenth government. The text of the mandate indicated seven points as the new government's priorities.

On 13 April 2019, Shtayyeh successfully forms a new government, and they are sworn in before President Abbas at the presidential headquarters in Ramallah.

On June 27, 2021, the Central Committee of the Palestinian People's Party decided to withdraw from the government due to its "disrespect for laws and public freedoms". Party member Nasri Abu Jaish then submitted his resignation as Minister of Labour, but was rejected by President Abbas. On 11 July, Abu Jaish decided to remain in his position after two failed resignation attempts.

On 1 January 2022, there were new appointments for two cabinet positions, with Ziad Mahmoud Muhammad Hab al-Reeh appointed as Minister of Interior and Hatem Mohamed Helmy al-Bakri as Minister of Awqaf and Religious Affairs. The two positions were held by Prime Minister Shtayyeh prior to this appointment.

On 3 September 2023, Prime Minister Mohammad Shtayyeh accepted Marwan Awartani's resignation request from his post as Minister of Education. He was replaced by Mahmoud Abu Muwais.

On February 26, 2024, Prime Minister Shtayyeh announced the cabinet's resignation during the 245th Cabinet session: "I placed the government’s resignation at the disposal of President Mahmoud Abbas last Tuesday, February 20, 2024, and today I submit it in writing." Later that evening, President Abbas accepted the resignation and tasked the cabinet with continuing governmental affairs until the formation of a new government.

== Composition ==
The Shtayyeh cabinet consisted of 18 ministers upon formation, including 5 from the previous cabinet. Three members of the cabinet are women. The government included a majority of members from the Palestine Liberation Organization, including Fatah but not including Popular Front for the Liberation of Palestine (PFLP) and the Democratic Front for the Liberation of Palestine (DFLP). Hamas and Palestinian Islamic Jihad, who are not PLO members, were also excluded from the government.

== Members of the Government ==
No.	Office	Minister	Portrait	Took office	Left office	Party
1	Prime Minister	Mohammad Shtayyeh		13 April 2019	31 March 2024	Fatah
2	Deputy Prime Minister	Ziad Abu Amr		13 April 2019	31 March 2024	Independent
3	Deputy Prime Minister; Minister of Information	Nabil Abu Rudeineh		13 April 2019	31 March 2024	
4	Minister of Interior	Mohammad Shtayyeh		13 April 2019	1 January 2022	Fatah
4	Minister of Interior	Ziad Mahmoud Muhammad Hab al-Reeh		1 January 2022	31 March 2024	
5	Minister of Awqaf and Religious Affairs	Mohammad Shtayyeh		13 April 2019	1 January 2022	Fatah
5	Minister of Awqaf and Religious Affairs	Hatem Mohamed Helmy al-Bakri		1 January 2022	31 March 2024	
6	Minister of Telecommunications and Information Technology	Ishaq Sidr		13 April 2019	31 March 2024	Fatah
7	Minister of Social Development	Ahmed Majdalani		13 April 2019	31 March 2024	Palestinian Popular Struggle Front
8	Minister of State for Entrepreneurship and Empowerment	Osama Al Saadawi		13 April 2019	31 March 2024	Fatah
9	Minister of Women's Affairs	Amal Hamad		13 April 2019	31 March 2024	Fatah
10	Minister of National Economy	Khaled Al Osaili		13 April 2019	31 March 2024	
11	Minister of Tourism and Antiquities	Rula Maayah		13 April 2019	31 March 2024	Fatah
12	Minister of Agriculture	Riad Attari		13 April 2019	31 March 2024	
13	Minister of Foreign Affairs and Expatriates	Riyad al-Maliki		13 April 2019	31 March 2024	Independent
14	Minister of Finance	Shoukry Bishara		13 April 2019	31 March 2024	Independent
15	Minister of Transport and Communications	Assem Salem		13 April 2019	31 March 2024	
16	Minister of Culture	Atef Abu Saif		13 April 2019	31 March 2024	Fatah
17	Minister of Jerusalem Affairs	Fadi al-Hadmi		13 April 2019	31 March 2024	
18	Minister of Local Government	Majdi al-Saleh		13 April 2019	31 March 2024	
19	Minister of Justice	Mohammad Fahhad Al-Shalaldeh		13 April 2019	31 March 2024	Fatah
20	Minister of Public Works and Housing	Mohamed Ziara		13 April 2019	31 March 2024	
21	Minister of Higher Education and Scientific Research	Mahmoud Abu Mwais		13 April 2019	31 March 2024	
22	Minister of Education	Marwan Awartani		13 April 2019	3 September 2023	Independent
22	Minister of Education	Mahmoud Abu Muwais		3 September 2023	31 March 2024	
23	Minister of Health	Mai Salem Al-Kailah		13 April 2019	31 March 2024	Fatah
24	Minister of Labour	Nasri Abu Jaish		13 April 2019	31 March 2024	Palestinian People's Party
–	Secretary General of the Council of Ministers	Amjad Ghanem		13 April 2019	31 March 2024	
–	Government Spokesperson	Ibrahim Melhem		13 April 2019	31 March 2024	
