= Ahmed Qurei =

2nd Prime Minister of the Palestinian National Authority

- أحمد قريع
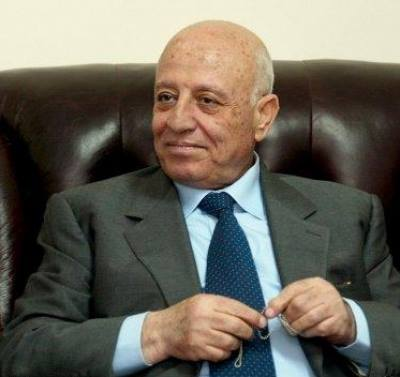
- Qurei in 2015

Prime Minister of the Palestinian National Authority
- In office 24 December 2005 – 29 March 2006
- President: Mahmoud Abbas
- Preceded by: Nabil Shaath (acting)
- Succeeded by: Ismail Haniyeh
- In office 7 October 2003 – 15 December 2005
- President: Yasser Arafat; Mahmoud Abbas
- Preceded by: Mahmoud Abbas
- Succeeded by: Nabil Shaath (acting)

Speaker of the Palestinian Legislative Council
- In office 7 March 1996 – 7 October 2003
- Preceded by: Position established
- Succeeded by: Rafiq Al-Natsheh

Member of the Palestinian Legislative Council for Jerusalem Governorate
- In office 7 March 1996 – 18 February 2006

Personal details
- Born: 26 March 1937 Abu Dis, Jerusalem Subdistrict, Palestine
- Died: 22 February 2023 (aged 85) Ramallah, Ramallah and al-Bireh Governorate, Palestine
- Resting place: Abu Dis, Jerusalem Governorate, Palestine
- Party: Fatah

Ahmed Ali Mohammad Qurei (also spelled Qureia or Qurie; Arabic: أحمد علي محمد قريع, Aḥmad ʿAlī Muḥammad Qurayʿ; 26 March 1937 – 22 February 2023), also known by his kunya Abu Alaa (Arabic: أبو علاء Abū ʿAláʾ), was a Palestinian politician who served as the second prime minister of the Palestinian National Authority.

First appointed to the position on 7 October 2003, he tendered his resignation on 26 January 2006, following the defeat of the Fatah party in the 2006 Palestinian legislative election, and remained in office in a caretaker capacity until 29 March when he was succeeded by Ismail Haniyeh. During his tenure as prime minister, he also had responsibility for security matters. He previously served as speaker of the Palestinian Legislative Council (PLC) and held a variety of significant positions within the Palestine Liberation Organization (PLO) from the 1970s on.

== Early political career ==
Qurei was born in Abu Dis (near Jerusalem), Mandatory Palestine, in 1937. He joined the Fatah faction, the largest of the political and military organisations making up the Palestine Liberation Organization, in 1968. As a banker, he used his expertise during the 1970s as the director of the PLO's foreign investment branch and director-general of the PLO's economic branch, helping to make the organisation one of the largest employers in Lebanon. He followed Yasser Arafat to Tunis after the PLO was forced to leave Lebanon. As more senior leaders died, Qurei rose to prominence and was elected to the Central Committee of Fatah in August 1989.

As a member of the Central Committee, Qurei was instrumental in negotiating the Oslo Accords (1993). He also founded and became director of the Palestinian Economic Council for Development and Reconstruction (PECDAR) in 1993 to help garner money from international donors. He held various posts in the first Palestinian Authority cabinets including Minister of Economy and Trade and Minister of Industry. He was also responsible for a development plan for the Palestinian territories submitted to the World Bank in 1993.

Qurei was elected as the Speaker of the Palestinian Legislative Council on 7 March 1996 in Gaza.

Later, he took part in the 2000 Camp David Summit with Ehud Barak and the Taba Summit with Shlomo Ben-Ami. Soon after, he was reelected to the PLC as a speaker in March 2001.

== Prime Minister (2003–2006) ==
After the resignation of Palestinian prime minister Mahmoud Abbas on 6 September 2003, Palestinian Authority President Yasser Arafat nominated Qurei for the post of prime minister. Qurei accepted the nomination for the post in an "emergency government" on 10 September. The next day, the Israeli government, apparently in response to bombings two days earlier, released a statement, announcing the decision that President Arafat would be "removed." Qurei decided upon that to form a full government rather than a trimmed one.

On 5 October 2003, Qurei was appointed prime minister by presidential decree, and an eight-member emergency government was sworn in on 7 October. However, Qurei could not form a new cabinet because of a dispute with Arafat which lasted for 10 weeks over the choice of an interior minister and control of the Palestinian Security Services, and he threatened to resign. While the Fatah Central Committee had agreed to the emergency cabinet with Qurei as caretaker prime minister, the Fatah-dominated PLC refused to hold a vote of confidence. The emergency cabinet's term expired on 4 November but Arafat asked Qurei to remain in office despite their dispute, and the PLC approved a new 24-member government on 12 November. Among Qurei's top priorities was negotiating and meeting the road map for peace plan with Israel. Israel's non-compliance and the United States not having done enough to enforce Israeli compliance with the peace plan, along with a lack of internal support, had been reasons for Abbas' earlier resignation.

On 17 July 2004, he submitted his resignation amid growing chaos in the Gaza Strip. Offices of the Palestinian Authority in Gaza were burned down, and gunmen briefly abducted 4 French aid workers, the police chief and another official, demanding reforms. Arafat refused to accept Qurei's resignation. Arafat and Qurei disputed on Qurei's demand for more authority to restructure the security forces to reduce the growing turmoil. President Arafat decreed a State of Emergency in Gaza. On 27 July Arafat and Qurei held a press conference after reaching a settlement in a cabinet meeting. Qurei had retracted his resignation.

After Arafat's death in November 2004 and Mahmoud Abbas' subsequent victory in the 2005 Palestinian presidential election, Qurei was asked to continue in his post and form a new cabinet. Due to repeated demands by the Fatah officials and PLC members to make the new cabinet more reform-minded, the vote of confidence was repeatedly delayed. It was finally passed on 24 February 2005 after Qurei had revised the list of ministers to accommodate these demands.

On 15 December 2005, Qurei briefly resigned his prime ministership post to run for a seat in the Palestinian Legislative Council, but returned to office nine days later after deciding not to run. On 26 January 2006, Qurei announced his intention to resign following the Fatah party's defeat by Hamas in the 2006 parliamentary elections. At the request of President Mahmoud Abbas, Qurei remained in office in a caretaker capacity until being replaced by Ismail Haniyeh on 29 March 2006.

== Later life and death ==
In 2004 Qurei said that if Israel failed to conclude an agreement with the Palestinians, that the Palestinians would pursue a single, bi-national state. During the 6th Fatah conference in August 2009, he failed to get reelected to the Fatah Central Committee. In 2012, in an article in Al-Quds Al-Arabi newspaper, Ahmed Qurei called for Palestinians to reconsider a one-state instead of a two-state solution. He blamed Israel for "burying" or "decapitating" the two-state solution through the building of settlements.

Qurei died on 22 February 2023, at the age of 85.

== Works ==
- 2001: Post-Oslo: Impasse and Options (OCLC 499875376)
- 2006: al-Dīmuqrāṭiyah wa-al-tajrubah al-barlamāniya al-Filasṭīniyah: tajribatī fī riʼāsat awwal majlis tashrīʻī Filasṭīnī (ISBN 9789953368887)
- 2006: From Oslo to Jerusalem: The Palestinian Story of the Secret Negotiations (ISBN 9781429454056)
- 2008: Beyond Oslo, The Struggle for Palestine: Inside the Middle East Peace Process from Rabin's Death to Camp David (ISBN 9781441605801)
- 2013: Negotiating Palestine: From the Second Intifada to Hamas' Electoral Victory (ISBN 9781780760933)
- 2015: Peace Negotiations in Palestine: From the Second Intifada to the Roadmap (ISBN 9781780760933)

== See also ==
- First Qurei Government
- Second Qurei Government
- Third Qurei Government
- List of Fatah members

Political offices
New office	Speaker of the Palestinian Legislative Council; 1996–2003	Succeeded by Rafiq Al-Natsheh
Preceded by Mahmoud Abbas	Prime Minister of the Palestinian National Authority; 2003–2005	Succeeded by Nabil Shaath; Acting
Preceded by Nabil Shaath; Acting	Prime Minister of the Palestinian National Authority; 2005–2006	Succeeded by Ismail Haniyeh
