= Third Qurei Government =

Government of Palestine, from Feb 2005

- Date formed: 24 February 2005
- Date dissolved: 29 March 2006

People and organisations
- President: Mahmoud Abbas
- Prime Minister: Ahmed Qurei (until 15 December); Nabil Shaath (acting, 15 December – 24 December); Ahmed Qurei (starting 24 December)
- No. of ministers: 24

History
- Predecessor: Second Qurei Government
- Successor: First Haniyeh Government

The Palestinian Authority Government of February 2005 was a government of the Palestinian National Authority (PA) which existed from 24 February 2005 to 29 March 2006. It was headed by Ahmed Qurei and composed of 24 ministers. The cabinet was dominated by technocrat professional appointees, nearly half of them with doctoral degrees. A large part of the Government was Fatah affiliated. The Government was approved by the Palestinian Legislative Council by a 54-12 vote, with four abstentions. It was succeeded by the Hamas-led Government of March 2006.

== Background ==
Pursuant to the Oslo Accords, the authority of the PA Government is limited to some civil rights of the Palestinians in the West Bank Areas A and B and in the Gaza Strip, and to internal security in Area A and in Gaza.

In January 2005, Mahmoud Abbas was elected the new President, following the death of Yasser Arafat. Abbas asked the incumbent Prime Minister Ahmed Qurei to continue in his post and form a new cabinet.

In March 2005, twelve Palestinian factions agreed on the Palestinian Cairo Declaration, which besides other things proposed that Hamas and Islamic Jihad join the Palestinian Liberation Organisation.

== Formation ==
In February 2005, News Agency WAFA published a list of members of the new government to be presented in the Palestinian Legislative Council for a vote of confidence. Fatah legislators had agreed to vote in favor of the government on 21 February. Due to repeated demands by Fatah officials and PLC members to make the new cabinet more reform-minded, however, the vote of confidence was repeatedly delayed. It was finally passed on 24 February, after Qurei had revised the list of ministers to accommodate these demands.

The Government was approved in Parliament by a 54-12 vote, with four abstentions (at the time, the PLC had 88 seats). It was headed again by Ahmed Qurei, and composed of 24 ministers. It was a technocrats cabinet dominated by professional appointees, nearly half of them with doctoral degrees. A large part of the Government was Fatah affiliated.

== Timeline ==
On 15 December 2005, Qurei briefly resigned his Prime Minister post to run for a seat in the Palestinian Parliament in the January 2006 elections, but returned to office nine days later after deciding not to run.

On 26 January 2006, Qurei announced his intention to resign following the Fatah party's defeat by Hamas in the parliamentary elections. At the request of PNA President, Mahmoud Abbas, Qurei remained in office in a caretaker capacity until a successor was named.

== Members of the Government ==
February 2005 to March 2006

	Minister	Office	Party
1	Ahmed Qurei	Prime Minister	Fatah
2	Nabil Shaath	Deputy Prime Minister, Information	Fatah
3	Salam Fayyad	Finance *	Independent
4	Nasser Yousef	Interior and National Security **	Fatah
5	Nasser al-Kidwa	Foreign Affairs	Fatah
6	Mohammed Dahlan	Civil Affairs	Fatah
7	Mazan Sunnoqrot	Economy	Independent
8	Walid Abed Rabbu	Agriculture	Independent
9	Naim Abu Hummous	Education and Higher Education	Fatah
10	Thihni al-Waheidi	Health	Independent
11	Mohammed Ishtayeh	Housing and Public Works	Fatah
12	Farid Jalad	Justice	Independent
13	Hassan abu Libdeh	Labour, Social Affairs	Fatah
14	Ghassan al-Khatib	Planning	PPP
15	Ziad Bandak	Tourism	Independent
16	Sayed al-Din Khurma	Transport	Independent
17	Khalid al- Qawasimi	Local Government	
18	Sufian Abu Zaida	Prisoner Affairs	Fatah
19	Yusuf Jum'ah Salamah	Religious Affairs	Independent
20	Sabri Saydam	Telecommunications, Technology	Independent
21	Zahira Kamal	Women’s Affairs	FIDA
22	Hind Khoury	Minister without Portfolio	
23	Ahmed Majdalani	Minister without Portfolio	PPSF
* Until November 2005, when Salam Fayyad resigned from the cabinet to run as leader of his new political party the Third Way ** In April 2005, the responsibilities of Interior Minister were expanded with National Security forces and General Intelligence
