= Third Arafat Government =

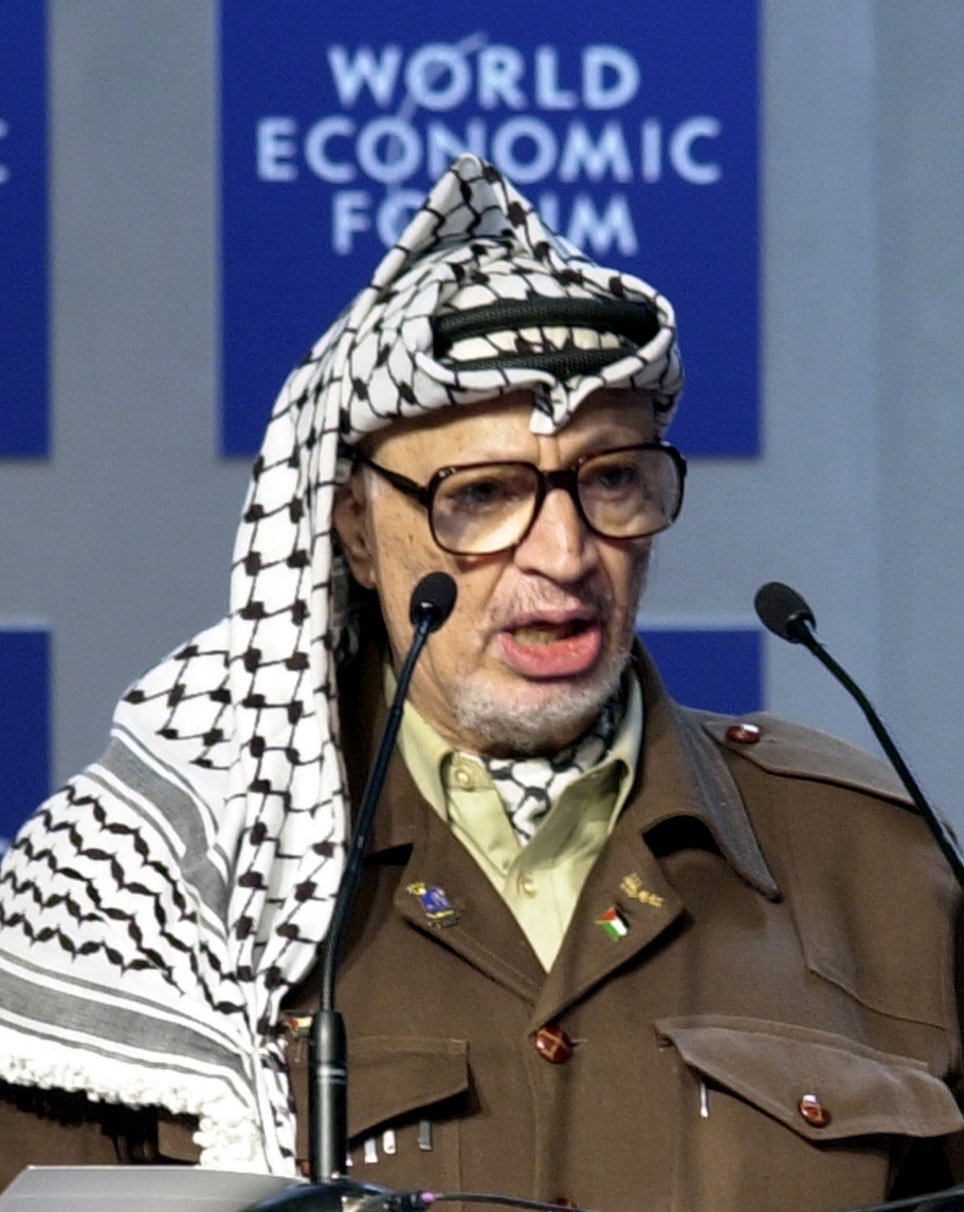
- Date formed: 9 August 1998
- Date dissolved: 13 June 2002

People and organisations
- Head of state: Yasser Arafat
- Head of government: Yasser Arafat
- Member party: PLO (30); Fatah (24) (Note: Includes Arafat); DAL (3); FIDA (1); PPP (2); Independents (3)
- Status in legislature: Formed by executive order

History
- Predecessor: Second Arafat Government
- Successor: Fourth Arafat Government

The third Yasser Arafat government was the third Palestinian government formed and headed by the President of the Palestinian National Authority Yasser Arafat. It succeeded the second Palestinian government and lasted from August 9, 1998 until the formation of the fourth Palestinian government on June 13, 2002.

The Cabinet of Yasser Arafat's third government consisted of 30 ministers, including Arafat (Note: Was also the Minister of Interior of the Palestine National Authority) himself and only one woman, Intissar al-Wazir.

Ministers were not appointed for the Ministries of Education, Youth and Sports, and Religious Affairs and Endowments. Three new ministries were created: the Ministry of Environmental Affairs, Ministry of Prisoners' Affairs, and Ministry of Parliamentary Affairs.

== Members of the Government ==
#	Name	Image	Ministerial Portfolio	Party	Notes
1	Yasser Arafat		President of the Palestinian National Authority and Minister of Interior	Fatah	Chairman of the PLO Executive Committee from the previous government
2	Faisal Husseini		Minister of Jerusalem Affairs	Fatah	Member of the PLO Executive Committee from the previous government
3	Nabil Ali Rashid Shaath		Minister of Planning and International Cooperation	Fatah	Member of the First Palestinian Legislative Council for Khan Yunis from the previous government
4	Saeb Mohammed Saleh Erekat		Minister of Local Government	Fatah	Member of the First Palestinian Legislative Council for Jericho from the previous government
5	Hikmat Hashem Lutfi Zaid		Minister of Agriculture	Fatah	Member of the First Palestinian Legislative Council for Jenin
6	Intissar Mustafa Mahmoud al-Wazir		Minister of Social Affairs	Fatah	Member of the First Palestinian Legislative Council for Gaza from the previous government
7	Freih Mustafa Freih Abu Middein		Minister of Justice	Fatah	Member of the First Palestinian Legislative Council for Deir al-Balah from the previous government
8	Maher Nashat Taher al-Masri		Minister of Economy and Trade	Fatah	Member of the First Palestinian Legislative Council for Nablus from the previous government
9	Jamil Yousef Mislah al-Tarifi		Minister of Civil Affairs	Fatah	Member of the First Palestinian Legislative Council for Ramallah and al-Bireh from the previous government
10	Azzam Najeeb Mustafa al-Ahmad		Minister of Public Works	Fatah	Member of the First Palestinian Legislative Council for Jenin from the previous government
11	Abdel Rahman Tawfiq Abdel Hadi Hamad		Minister of Housing	Fatah	Member of the First Palestinian Legislative Council for North Gaza from the previous government
12	Abdel Aziz Ali Abdel Aziz Shahin		Minister of Supply	Fatah	Member of the First Palestinian Legislative Council for Rafah from the previous government
13	Rafiq Shaker Darwish al-Natsheh		Minister of Labor	Fatah	Member of the First Palestinian Legislative Council for Hebron
14	Riyad Dheeb Saleem Zanoun		Minister of Health	Fatah	Member of the First Palestinian Legislative Council for Gaza from the previous government
15	Nabil Mahmoud Yousef Amr		Minister of Parliamentary Affairs	Fatah	Member of the First Palestinian Legislative Council for Hebron
16	Saadi Mahmoud Suleiman al-Karnaz		Minister of Industry	Fatah	Member of the First Palestinian Legislative Council for Deir al-Balah
17	Ali Ibrahim Ghazal al-Qawasmi		Minister of Transport	Fatah	Member of the First Palestinian Legislative Council for Hebron from the previous government
18	Mitri Tanas Jaris Abu Aita		Minister of Tourism	Fatah	Member of the First Palestinian Legislative Council for Bethlehem
19	Talal Mohammed Abdul Razaq Seder		Minister of State	Independent	from the previous government
20	Imad Abdul Hamid Abdul Hadi al-Falouji		Minister of Telecommunications	Independent	Member of the First Palestinian Legislative Council for North Gaza from the previous government
21	Yasser Abdul Majid Adib Abed Rabbo		Minister of Culture and Information	FIDA Party	Member of the PLO Executive Committee from the previous government
22	Mohammed Zuhdi al-Nashashibi		Minister of Finance	Independent	Member of the PLO Executive Committee from the previous government
23	Munther Salah		Minister of Higher Education	Independent	
24	Yousef Atta Allah Ibrahim Abu Safieh		Minister of State for Environmental Affairs	Fatah	Member of the First Palestinian Legislative Council for North Gaza
25	Hisham Ali Hassan Abdel Razek		Minister of State for Prisoners Affairs	Fatah	Member of the First Palestinian Legislative Council for North Gaza
26	Ziad Ali Khalil Abu Zayyad		Minister of State for Jerusalem Affairs	Fatah	Member of the First Palestinian Legislative Council for Jerusalem
27	Hassan Mohammed Ahmed Asfour		Minister of State for NGO Affairs	Palestinian People's Party	Member of the First Palestinian Legislative Council for Khan Younis
28	Bashir Barghouti		Minister of State	Palestinian People's Party	from the previous government
29	Nabil Qassis		Minister of State for Bethlehem Affairs	Independent	
30	Ahmed Abdel Rahman		Secretary General of the Cabinet	Fatah	from the previous government
