= First Haniyeh Government =

Short-lived unity government

- 10th Cabinet of Palestine
- Date formed: 29 March 2006
- Date dissolved: 17 March 2007

People and organisations
- Head of state: Mahmoud Abbas
- Head of government: Ismail Haniyeh
- Deputy head of government: Nasser al-Shaer
- No. of ministers: 25
- Total no. of members: 25
- Member party: Hamas
- Status in legislature: Majority government
- Opposition party: Fatah
- Opposition leader: Mahmoud Abbas

History
- Election: 2006 Palestinian legislative election
- Predecessor: Third Qurei Government
- Successor: Second Haniyeh Government

The Palestinian Authority Government of March 2006, also known as the First Haniyeh Government, was a government of the Palestinian National Authority (PA), led by Ismail Haniyeh, that was sworn in on 29 March 2006 and was followed by the Palestinian unity government of 17 March 2007. On 25 January 2006, Hamas won the election for the Palestinian Legislative Council (PLC) with 44.4% of the vote vs Fatah's 41.4%, and its leader Haniyeh formed the government, which comprised mostly Hamas members as well as four independents, after Fatah and other factions had refused to form a government with Hamas. It was the first Hamas-led PA government in the Palestinian territories.

Due to the inability of Hamas and Fatah to form a single government, conflict and fighting between Fatah and Hamas followed the election, resulting in Hamas completely taking over governance in Gaza in June 2007 after the Fatah–Hamas conflict. This leads to confusion about who is the legitimate "Palestinian Authority." Fatah gained control of the West Bank in 2007, and is generally referred to as the PA or "Palestinian Authority" while Hamas is more often called the "Palestinian Authority Government."

The Quartet on the Middle East called on the Hamas government to recognize Israel's right to exist, forswear violence, and accept the validity of previous Palestinian-Israeli agreements, including the Oslo Accords. When Hamas rejected these conditions, several governments including Israel and the United States suspended aid to Palestine and imposed sanctions on the PA government. On the swearing in of the Hamas government, Israel also withheld taxes collected on behalf of the PA, which would last for 12 months. In April 2006, government ministers resigned membership in Hamas in response to international sanctions. To forestall a worsening humanitarian crisis and the collapse of the PA, the EU proposed the setting up of a "temporary international mechanism" (TIM) to channel international funds to the Palestinians through the Palestinian president, bypassing the Hamas-led government. TIM was accepted by the Quartet and the United States on 17 June 2006.

Following the abduction of Gilad Shalit by Gaza-based Palestinian militants, Israel detained nearly a third of the PLC members and ministers, all officials or supporters of Hamas from the West Bank.

== Background ==
Pursuant to the Oslo Accords, the authority of the PA Government is limited to some civil rights of the Palestinians in the West Bank Areas A and B and in the Gaza Strip, and to internal security in Area A and in Gaza.

== Formation ==
The Palestinian legislative election, held on 25 January 2006, was won by Hamas. On 26 January 2006, Fatah leader Saeb Erakat said his party did not want to join a Hamas Government. The Fatah Central Committee decided that Fatah will not join the next Government, but said it would depend on President Abbas. On 28 January 2006, Hamas declared it would try to form a Government of technocrats, if a government with Fatah and all the political groups was not possible. On 29 January 2006, PLC deputies from Fatah confirmed after talks with Abbas that their faction would not join Hamas in a coalition Government and would prefer to sit in opposition, despite calls by Hamas for a “political partnership”. The decision was, however, not discussed and ratified by the Fatah Central Committee.

On 27 March 2006, Ismail Haniyeh announced formation of the new government, comprising Hamas members and four independents, to the Palestinian Legislative Council. On 28 March, the government was approved by the PLC and sworn in on 29 March 2006.

== International reaction ==
After the Hamas victory at the 2006 Palestinian legislative election, Israel said that if Hamas was part of the new PA government, it would restrict the movement of money, people and goods into and out of the Gaza Strip and the West Bank. The Quartet on the Middle East had said that its members would not deal with the Hamas government unless Hamas recognized Israel's right to exist, forswears violence and accepts the validity of previous Palestinian-Israeli agreements. Hamas rejected these conditions and a substantial part of the international community, especially Israel and the United States, refused to deal with the Hamas government, and imposed sanctions.

Following the swearing in of a Hamas-led government on 29 March 2006, Israel, the United States and the Quartet imposed sanctions against the PA. On the swearing in of the Hamas government, Israel also withheld taxes collected on behalf of the PA, which would last for 12 months.

== Timeline ==
Due to the Israeli blockade, Ministers from West Bank and Gaza were compelled to communicate by videophone. One of the first acts of the Hamas cabinet was to freeze a round of appointments by the outgoing Fatah-led government.

A struggle for power between President Abbas and the new government emerged over the security services. Abbas made Fatah-affiliated Rashid Abu Shbak head of the three branches of the Palestinian Security Services, with authority to hire and fire officers in the three security branches, bypassing the authority of the Hamas Interior Minister. He also ordered all diplomatic statements and dealings be coordinated with the Fatah-dominated Palestine Liberation Organization, after Foreign Minister Mahmoud Zahar had sent a letter to the UN Secretary General.

In April 2006, it was announced that the Hamas Ministers in the cabinet had resigned their membership in Hamas, in an effort to reduce Israeli and international pressure, facing the economic siege. The government was followed by a unity government of March 2007.

== Members of the Government ==
March 2006 to March 2007

	Minister	Office	Party
1	Ismail Haniyeh	Prime Minister	Hamas
1	Ismail Haniyeh	Sports and Youth Minister	Hamas
2	Nasser al-Shaer	Deputy Prime Minister	Hamas
2	Nasser al-Shaer	Education Minister	Hamas
3	Mahmoud al-Zahar	Foreign Affairs Minister	Hamas
4	Omar Abd al-Razaq	Finance Minister	Hamas
5	Said Seyam	Interior Minister	Hamas
6	Basem Naim	Health	Hamas
7	Alaeddin al-A'raj	Economy	Hamas
8	Fakhri Turkman	Social Affairs	Independent
9	Wasfi Kabha	Prisoners Affairs	Hamas
10	Yousef Rizqa	Information	Hamas
11	Mariam Saleh	Woman Affairs	Hamas
12	Ahmed Khalidi	Justice	Independent
13	Jamal al Khudari	Telecommunications and Information Technology	Independent
14	Abdul Rahman Zeidan	Public Works	Hamas
15	Joudeh George Murqos	Tourism	Independent **
16	Attallah Abul Sabeh	Culture	Hamas
17	Ziad Al-Zaza	Transportation	Hamas
18	Nayef Rajoub	Religious Affairs	Hamas
19	Samir Abu Eisheh	Planning	Hamas
20	Mohammed al Agha	Agriculture	Hamas
21	Khaled Abu Arafeh	Minister without Portfolio	Hamas
22	Issa Ja'bari	Local Governance Ministry	Hamas
23	Atef Udwan	Refugees	Hamas
24	Mohammad Barghouti	Labor	Hamas
25	Mohammed Awad	Chief of Cabinet (Rank of Minister)	Hamas
Notes: * Some ministers were arrested by Israel, making their duties being transferred to other ministers. ** Joudeh George Murqos was the only Christian minister in the government.

== See also ==
- Palestinian government
- Palestinian Prisoners' Document
