= Second Haniyeh Government =

Palestinian Authority unity government

- 11th Cabinet of Palestine

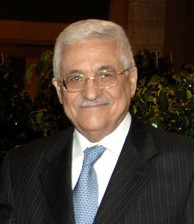
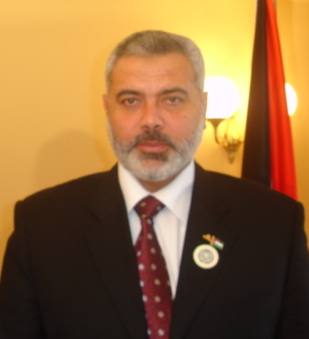
- Mahmoud Abbas and Ismail Haniyeh, respectively President and Prime Minister of Palestine in 2007
- Date formed: 17 March 2007
- Date dissolved: 14 June 2007

People and organisations
- Head of state: Mahmoud Abbas
- Head of government: Ismail Haniyeh
- No. of ministers: 25

History
- Legislature term: Palestinian Legislative Council (2006–2010)
- Predecessor: First Haniyeh Government
- Successor: Salam Fayyad Emergency Government; Hamas government of June 2007

The Second Haniyeh Government, also known as the Palestinian National Unity Government of March 2007 (Arabic: المجلس الفلسطيني لآذار 17 2007), was a Palestinian Authority unity government headed by Ismail Haniyeh, the Prime Minister of the Palestinian National Authority, that was formed on 17 March 2007 and dissolved on 14 June 2007.

The Unity Government was formed on 17 March 2007 following negotiations in Mecca, but due to failing international support (because it did not meet the conditions required by the Quartet on the Middle East), it was short-lived. Israel immediately rejected the Government and said it will deal with Abbas, but not with the new government unless it recognizes the Jewish state. Israeli officials said they would try to persuade the world not to deal with the government.

The Government was dissolved by President Mahmoud Abbas on 14 June 2007 after the Hamas takeover of Gaza.

== Background ==
Hamas decisively won the 2006 Palestinian legislative election held on 25 January 2006. Israel and the Quartet on the Middle East had previously stated that their continued aid to and dialogue with the PA under a Hamas government was conditional on Hamas agreeing to three conditions: recognition of Israel, the disavowal of violent actions, and acceptance of previous agreements between Israel and the PA, including the Oslo Accords. Haniya refused to accept these conditions. On the day the First Haniyeh Government was sworn in, on 29 March, Israel and the Quartet stopped all dialogue with the PA and especially any member of the Hamas government, ceased providing aid to the PA and imposed sanctions against the PA under Hamas. Israel had also withheld the transfers of PA revenues for more than a year.

President Abbas and the Fatah-dominated PLO developed a plan to replace the Hamas government with one acceptable to Israel and the international community. According to the plan, unveiled in Al Jazeera's Palestine Papers, a national unity government would be formed to prepare early presidential and legislative elections by mid-2007. If the establishment of a government meeting the Quartet's conditions failed, Abbas would dismiss the government and form an emergency government or call early elections. An "Action Plan Leading to Early Elections" envisioned a strong enlargement of Fatah's Presidential Guard, internal reform of Fatah, empowering of presidential institutions, resumption of aid by the international community through the President's Office, and the end of withholding of taxes by Israel.

== Timeline ==
On 25 January 2006, Hamas won the elections for the Palestinian Legislative Council (PLC).

On 29 March 2006, the First Haniyeh-led PA government was sworn in. Israel, the United States, the European Union and several other countries impose sanctions against the PA, including suspension of all international aid.

On 17 June 2006, a temporary international mechanism was created to channel aid to Palestinians bypassing the Hamas-led PA government, including paying aid funds directly to the accounts of President Abbas.

On 8 February 2007, negotiations resulted in the Fatah–Hamas Mecca Agreement to form a Palestinian national unity government. The agreement was signed by Abbas on behalf of Fatah and by Khaled Mashal on behalf of Hamas. The agreement also contained a "letter of commission" from Abbas to Haniyeh, calling on Haniyeh as premier of the next government to achieve Palestinian national goals as approved by the Palestine National Council, the Basic Law and the National Reconciliation Document (the Prisoners' Document) as well as the decisions of the Arab summit.

On 17 March 2007, Haniyeh presented the national unity government to the PLC, which was approved 83–3. At the time, 41 of the 132 members of the PLC were in Israeli detention. The 25 ministers were sworn in the next day by President Abbas. The program of the national unity government included ending the Israeli occupation of the Palestinian territories and recognizing the right to self-determination of the Palestinian people, and the establishment of the independent Palestinian state with full sovereignty within the 1967 borders, with al-Quds as its capital, implementation of the Cairo Agreement pertaining to the PLO, and commitment to the Palestinian right of return. Israel rejected the new government.

Between 10 and 14 June 2007, Hamas took control of the Gaza Strip after fierce battles between Fatah and Hamas.

On 14 June 2007, President Abbas declared a state of emergency by presidential decree, and dismissed the Haniyeh-led unity government. He appointed an emergency government led by Salam Fayyad and controversially suspended articles of the Basic Law to dispense with the need for PLC approval of the new government. The Fayyad government was swiftly recognized by the international community. Haniyeh and Hamas have refused to accept the dismissal, and continues to claim it is the legitimate caretaker government of the Palestinian Authority on the basis that the PLC, which continues to be controlled by Hamas, has not approved the new government.

== Members of the Government ==
March to June 2007

	Minister	Office	Party
1	Ismail Hanieh	Prime Minister	Hamas
2	Azzam al-Ahmad	Deputy Prime Minister	Fatah
3	Salam Fayyad	Finance Minister	Third Way
4	Ziad Abu Amr	Foreign Affairs Minister	Independent
5	Talab al-Qawasmi	Interior Minister	Independent
6	Nasser Eddin al-Sha'er	Education Minister	Hamas
7	Mustafa al-Barghouthi	Information	Palestinian National Initiative
8	Bassam al-Salhi	Culture	Palestinian People's Party
9	Radwan al-Akhras	Health	Fatah
10	Sa'di al-Krunz	Transport	Fatah
11	Mahmoud Aloul	Labour	Fatah
12	Saleh Zeidan	Social Affairs	Democratic Front for the Liberation of Palestine
13	Taysir Abu Sneineh	Prisoners' Affairs	Fatah
14	Samir Abu Eisheh	Planning	Hamas
15	Mohammed al-Barghouthi	Local Government	Hamas
16	Ziad al-Zaza	Economic Affairs	Hamas
17	Basem Naim	Youth and Sports	Hamas
18	Yousef al-Mansi	Telecommunications and Information Technology	Hamas
19	Mohammed al-Agha	Agriculture	Hamas
20	Khouloud D'eibes	Tourism	Independent
21	Samih al-Abed	Public Works	Fatah
22	Ali al-Sartawi	Justice	Hamas
23	Hussein Tartouri	Waqf and Religious Affairs	Hamas
24	Amal Syam	Woman Affairs	Hamas
25	Wasfi Kabha	State	Hamas

== See also ==
- Palestinian government
