= Shoukry Bishara =

Palestinian economist

Shukri Bishara
- شكري بشارة
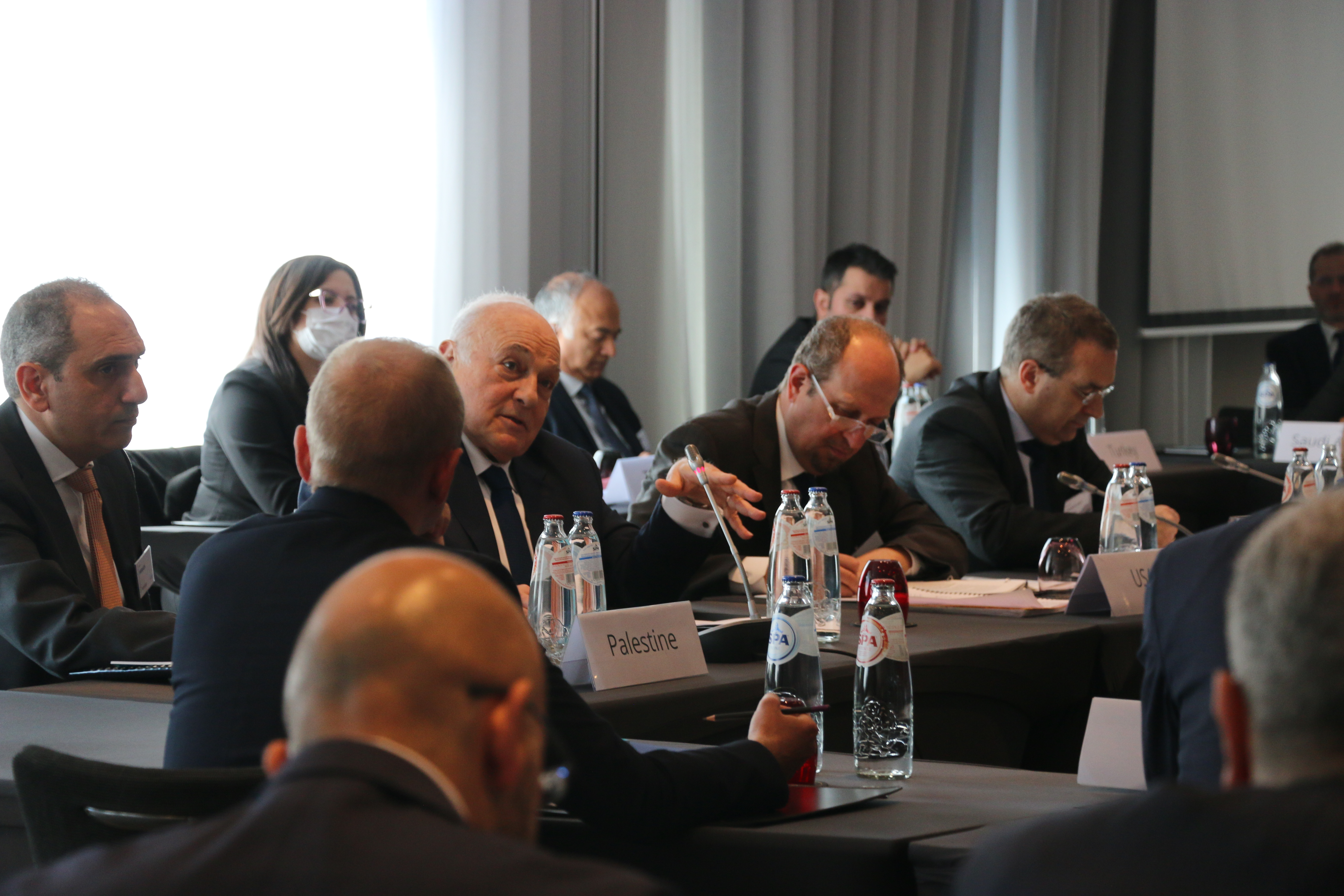
- Bishara in the center

Minister of Finance
- In office 1 July 2019 – 31 March 2024
- Prime Minister: Mohammad Shtayyeh
- Preceded by: Himself (as Minister of Finance and Planning)
- Succeeded by: Omar al-Bitar

Minister of Finance and Planning
- In office 2 June 2014 – 1 July 2019
- Prime Minister: Rami Hamdallah; Mohammad Shtayyeh
- Preceded by: Himself (as Minister of Finance); Mohammad Abu Ramadan (as Minister of State for Planning and Administrative Development)
- Succeeded by: Himself (as Minister of Finance); Wael Zaqout (as Minister of Planning and International Cooperation) (2024)

Minister of Finance
- In office 6 June 2013 – 2 June 2014
- Prime Minister: Rami Hamdallah
- Preceded by: Salam Fayyad
- Succeeded by: Himself (as Minister of Finance and Planning)

Personal details
- Born: Shukri Asaad Shukri Bishara; 7 October 1948 (age 77) Tarshiha, Palestine (present-day Ma'alot-Tarshiha, Israel)
- Party: Independent
- Education: American University of Beirut (BA); University of London (MA)
- Occupation: Politician, economist

Shukri Asaad Shukri Bishara (Arabic: شكري بشارة, also spelled Shoukry Bishara; born 7 October 1948) is a Palestinian politician and economist who served as Minister of Finance of Palestine from 6 June 2013 to 31 March 2024.

Political offices
Preceded by Salam Fayyad	Minister of Finance; 2013–2024	Succeeded by Omar al-Bitar
