= First and Second Hamdallah Governments =

Palestinian governments

- Date formed: 6 June 2013 (First); 19 September 2013 (Second)
- Date dissolved: 19 September 2013 (First); 2 June 2014 (Second)

People and organisations
- Head of state: Mahmoud Abbas
- Head of government: Rami Hamdallah

History
- Predecessor: Second Fayyad Government
- Successor: Third Hamdallah Government

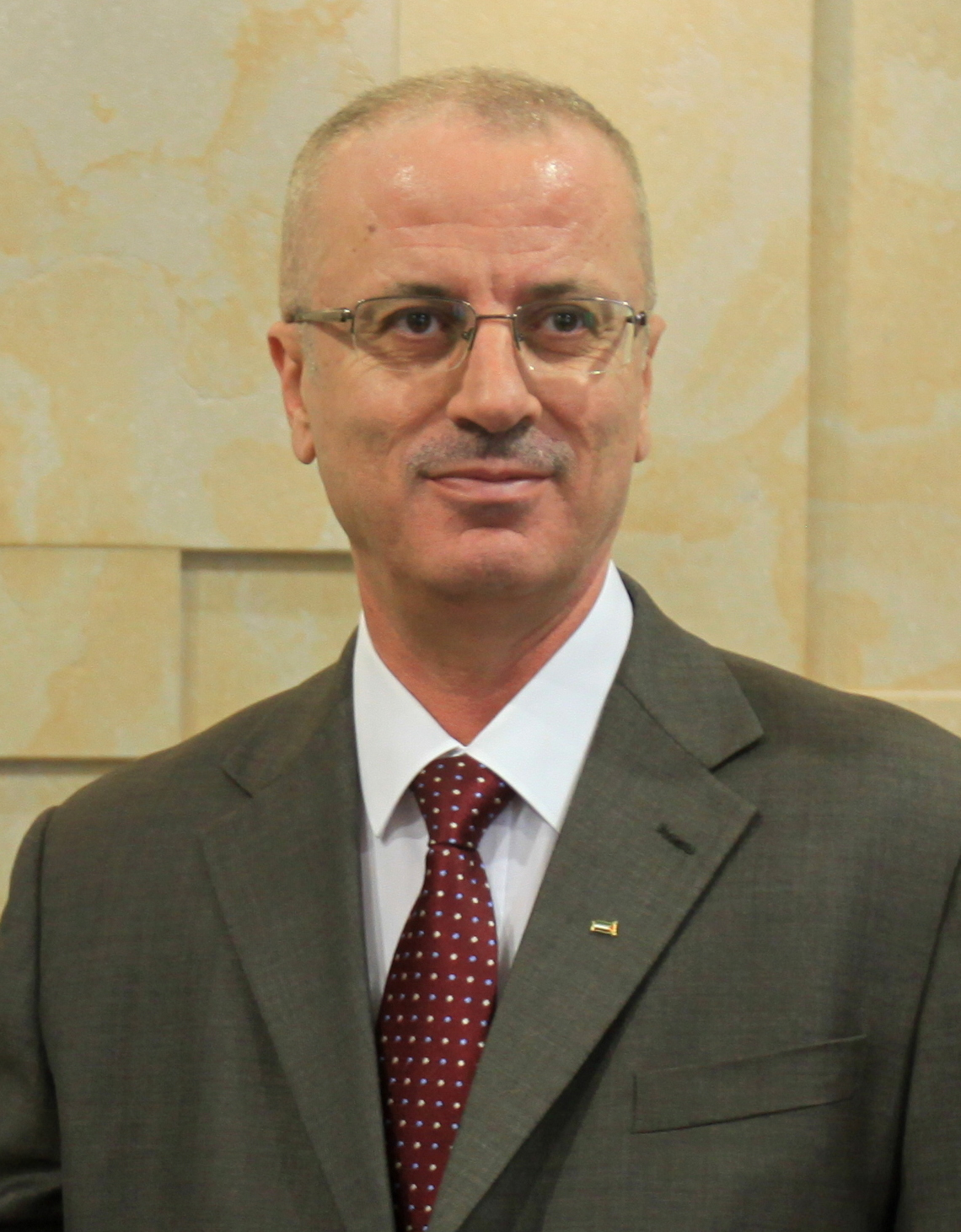
Rami Hamdallah led the Palestinian government of 2013

The Palestinian governments of 2013 were two Palestinian governments established respectively on 6 June and 19 September 2013. They ruled de facto over the West Bank only.

The Palestinian government of June 2013 was led by Rami Hamdallah, appointed by Palestinian President Mahmoud Abbas by presidential decree on 6 June 2013 in Ramallah, the West Bank. The cabinet comprised 24 members, and was not presented for approval by the Palestinian Legislative Council. Two weeks later, Hamdallah resigned in protest at the appointment of two deputy prime ministers for political and economic affairs. Hamdallah later backtracked from his resignation and on 19 September 2013, the cabinet was sworn in for the second time, without any changes.

The Hamdallah government succeeded the successive governments of Salam Fayyad, who had resigned as a consequence of the 2011–2012 anti-corruption protests.

== Timeline ==
On 14 February 2013, amid pan-Arab calls for reform, Prime Minister Fayyad submitted to President Abbas his resignation along with that of his cabinet. After consultations with other factions, institutions, and civil society groups, Abbas asked Fayyad to form a new government. The reshuffle had long been demanded by Fayyad as well as members of Abbas's Fatah faction.

On 6 June 2013, President Mahmud Abbas appointed Rami Hamdallah Prime Minister, but was not presented for approval by the Palestinian Legislative Council.

Two weeks later, Hamdallah resigned in protest at the appointment of two deputy prime ministers for political and economic affairs. According to Hassan Khraisheh, deputy speaker of the PLC, the real reason Hamdallah resigned was because he discovered the Prime Minister has no power and that there was no point in having a prime minister “at a time when President Abbas has a monopoly over all the executive branch’s authorities.” “The presence of two deputy prime ministers, who are friends of President Abbas, means that the prime minister is a powerless figure,” Hamdallah's June appointment was originally envisioned as an interim measure until a unity government with Hamas could be formed.

On 23 June 2013, Abbas accepted Hamdallah's resignation, but asked him to stay on on a caretaker basis until a new premier could be appointed.

On 19 September 2013, Hamdallah withdrew his resignation and the government was sworn in for the second time, without any changes.

In June 2014, the government was replaced by a Fatah-Hamas unity government, with Hamdallah as prime minister.

== Members of the Government ==
June 2013 to June 2014

	Minister	Office	Party
1	Rami Hamdallah	Prime Minister	Fatah
2	Ziad Abu Amr	Deputy Prime Minister for Political Affairs	
3	Muhammad Mustafa	Deputy Prime Minister for Economic Affairs	
4	Riyad al-Malki	Foreign Affairs Minister	
5	Said Abu Ali	Interior Minister	Fatah
6	Shukri Bishara	Finance Minister	
7	Ali Muhanna	Justice	
8	Ahmad Majdalani	Labor	
9	Ali Abu Zuhri	Education Minister	
10	Kamal al-Sharafi	Social Affairs	
11	Mahmoud al-Habash	Waqf and Religious Affairs	
12	Rabiha Diab	Women's Affairs	
13	Issa Qaraqe	Prisoners Affairs	
14	Maher Ghneim	Public works and Housing	
15	Adnan al-Husseini	Jerusalem Affairs	
16	Jawad Harazallah	National Economy	
17	Rula Maa'yaa	Tourism and Antiquities	
18	Safaa’ Nasser Eddin	Telecommunications and Information Technology	
19	Walid Assaf	Agriculture	
20	Jawad Awwad	Health	
21	Sa’ed al-Kawni	Local Government	
22	Nabil Dmeidi	Transportation	
23	Muhammad Abu Ramadan	State for Planning affairs	
24	Hussein al-Sheikh	Civil Affairs	Fatah
25	Fawwaz Aqel	Secretary-General of the Cabinet (Rank of Minister)	

== See also ==
- Palestinian government
- Hamas government of 2012
