= Palestinian Security Services =

Armed forces and intelligence agencies of the State of Palestine

- الأجهزة الأمنية الفلسطينية
- Founded: 1994
- Service branches: National Security; Police; Preventive Security; Presidential Guard; General Intelligence

Leadership
- President: Mahmoud Abbas
- Interior Minister: Ziad Hab al-Rih

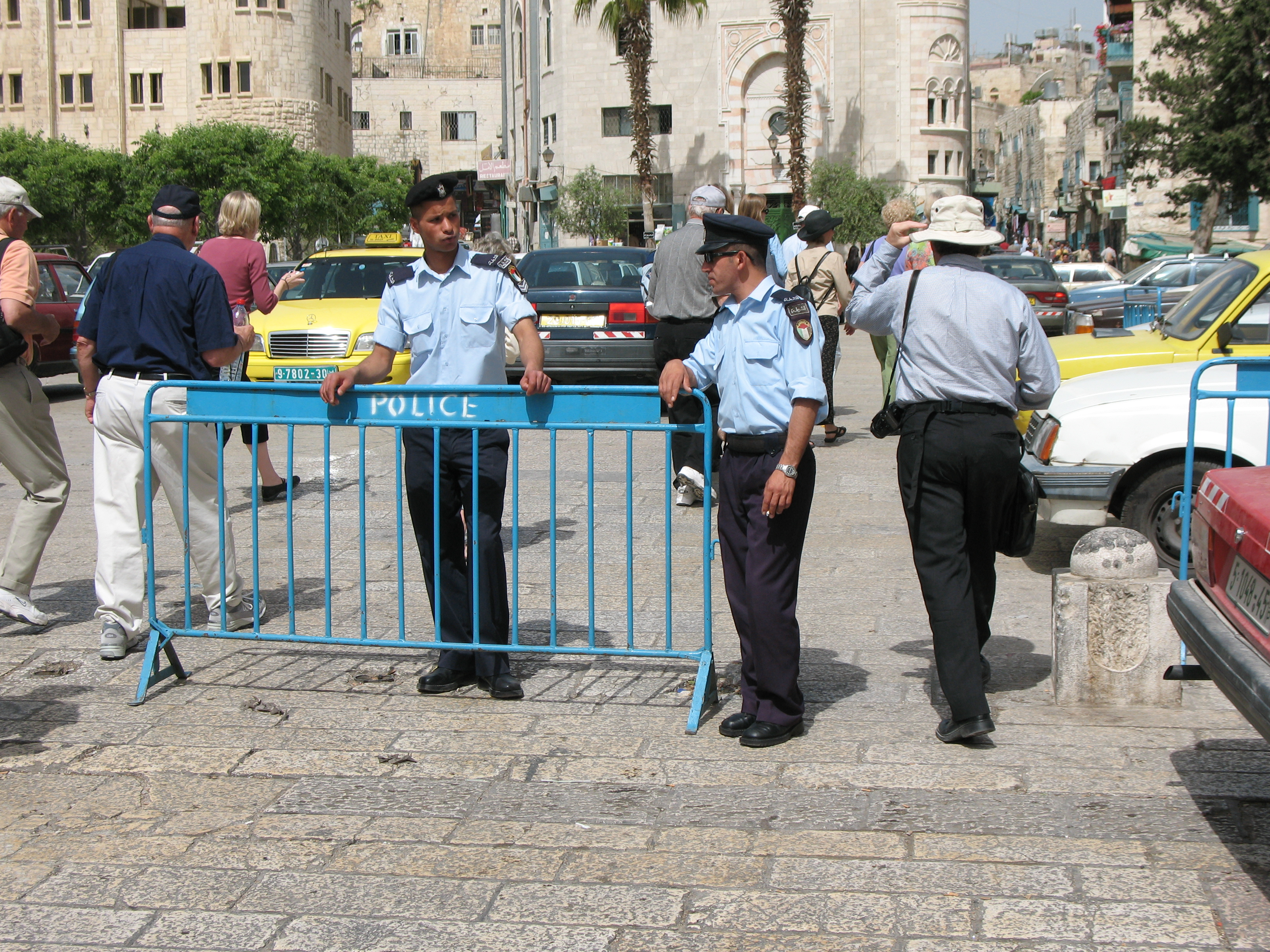
Palestinian police in Bethlehem, 2007

The Palestinian Security Services (PSS) are the armed forces and intelligence agencies of the State of Palestine. They comprise twelve branches, notably the Security Forces, the civil police, the Presidential Guard and the national security forces. The President of the Palestinian National Authority is Commander-in-Chief of the Palestinian Forces.

One in 16 West Bank Palestinians work for these branches, making the area one of the most policed populations in the world. Both their training and funding are mainly provided by the United States and Israel. The Palestinian Authority spends more on its security than the combined budgetry disbursements it makes for education and health services.

== Background ==
The State of Palestine has no land army, nor an air force or a navy. The Palestinian Security Services (PSS, not to be confused with the Preventive Security Service) do not possess heavy weapons and advanced military equipment like tanks.

In the Israeli–Palestinian peace process, Israel has consistently demanded that the Palestinian state would always be demilitarized. Israeli negotiators demanded to keep Israeli troops in the West Bank, to maintain control of Palestinian airspace, and to dictate exactly what weapons could and could not be purchased by the Palestinian security forces. In June 2009 at Bar-Ilan University, Israeli Prime Minister Benjamin Netanyahu said: ″We cannot be expected to agree to a Palestinian state without ensuring that it is demilitarised.″

Article XII of the Oslo II Accord states:

″In order to guarantee public order and internal security for the Palestinians of the West Bank and the Gaza Strip, the [Palestinian] Council shall establish a strong police force as set out in Article XIV below. Israel shall continue to carry the responsibility for defense against external threats, including the responsibility for protecting the Egyptian and Jordanian borders, and for defense against external threats from the sea and from the air, as well as the responsibility for overall security of Israelis and Settlements, for the purpose of safeguarding their internal security and public order, and will have all the powers to take the steps necessary to meet this responsibility.″

Article II of Annex I stipulates:

″The Palestinian Police is the only Palestinian security authority.″

The Annex allows a security force limited to six branches:

- Civil Police
- Public Security
- Preventive Security
- Presidential Security
- Intelligence
- Emergency Services and Rescue (Civil Defence)

== Organization ==
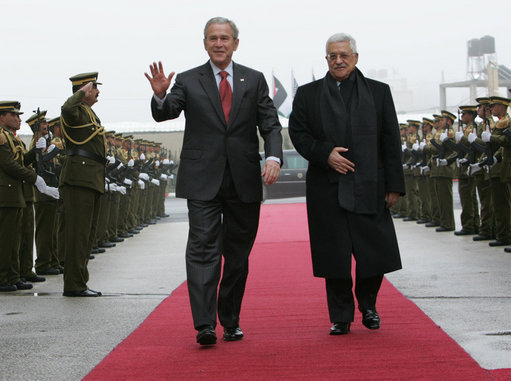
Presidential Guard, 2008

=== From Oslo to Second Intifada ===
Following the Oslo Accords in 1993, the number of separate Palestinian security forces, all under the exclusive control of President Arafat, had grown considerably. Based on the 1994 Cairo Agreement, "a strong police force" was formed which steadily grew far beyond the agreed numbers, to include soldiers and returnees from the diaspora. By 1996, the PA had more than 35,000 security officers on its payroll. Arafat ruled the forces in an authoritarian divide-to-rule manner, not devoid of corruption and nepotism.

During the Second Intifada, in 2002, the Israeli army virtually completely destroyed the infrastructure of the Palestinian security, leaving a security vacuum that was soon filled by armed groups. By 2006, some 70% of the Palestinians trusted non-PA forces, such as Hamas and Islamic Jihad, more than the PA security forces.

=== 2002–2004 reform ===
In 2002, Arafat created the post of Interior Minister with responsibility for public order and internal security, including authority over the security organizations Preventive Security, Civil Police and Civil Defence.

==== National Security Council ====
Under Israeli and international pressure, based on the 2003 Roadmap for peace, Arafat started to reorganise the PSS. On 30 April 2003, Arafat issued a presidential decree calling for the establishment of a National Security Council (NSC) to oversee the PNA's security services. It was the result of a power struggle between Prime Minister Mahmoud Abbas and President Arafat, and international – mainly American – pressure. Abbas would become acting Interior Minister in his new government. On 11 September, Arafat announced the formation of the 14-member Council that would supervise all the security organs, with him as chairman. Like his predecessor, the newly appointed Prime Minister Ahmed Qurei disagreed with Arafat about the appointment of the Interior Minister.

On 8 November 2003, Prime Minister Qurei and President Arafat, after having resolved disputes over the choice of the new Interior Minister, agreed to divide the security responsibilities between the government and the National Security Council. The NSC (headed by Arafat) became responsible for security affairs, while the Interior Minister would be in charge of non-security administrative and civilian affairs. Qurei was also a member of the NSC along with the Finance Minister Salam Fayyad and the heads of the security agencies. Eventually, Arafat's close associate Hakam Balawi became the new Interior Minister in Qurei's Government, which was approved on 12 November 2003. However, the National Security Council remained aineffective, as Arafat continued to control the security branches directly.

==== Three branches ====
Again under international pressure, on 17 July 2004 Arafat announced further changes to the PSS, reducing the eight separate security divisions to three branches, after 6 people were kidnapped in Gaza. The three branches were: National Security Forces, Internal Security Forces and General Intelligence.

Arafat nominated three close relatives as heads of the new branches, including his nephew Moussa Arafat, who was already head of the general security branch in the Gaza Strip. It fueled protests and internal clashes between rival sections of the security forces staffed by members of Arafat's party Fatah. The already existing protests were widely seen as a power struggle ahead of Israel's announced disengagement from Gaza. Yasser Arafat withdrew the controversial nomination of Moussa Arafat, but the latter remained head of the general security branch in the Gaza Strip.

=== 2005 reform ===
After his election as President of the Palestinian National Authority in January 2005, Mahmoud Abbas continued the reform of the security services. On 14 April 2005, Abbas confirmed that the previous 12 security divisions were to be merged into three branches, in accordance with the 2004 decree of his predecessor Arafat. On 4 June 2005, Abbas promulgated the "Law of Service in the Palestinian Security Forces No. 8 of 2005". The three branches were:

- National Security Forces – under the leadership of the Minister of National Security and under the command of the Commander-in-Chief.
- Interior (Internal Security Forces) – under the leadership of the Minister of the Interior and under the command of the Director-General of Internal Security.
- General Intelligence – affiliated with the President, under the leadership of the Head of the service.

Nasser Yousef was named head of the three branches. With the reform, Yousef's responsibilities, who was appointed Interior Minister two months earlier, were considerably expanded. Rashid Abu Shbak was named the new head of the Palestinian Preventive Security Service.

On 22 April, Abbas retired head of the Gaza national security forces Moussa Arafat and replaced him with Suleiman Heles; head of the Gaza General Intelligence Amin al-Hindi was replaced by Tareq Abu Rajab. Alaa Husni was appointed head of the Palestinian police, while a further 1,150 Palestinian security officials were also retired.

From September 2005, the NSC was headed by the President and the Prime Minister. Other members were the PLO's Negotiations Affairs Department (NAD), the Secretary General of the Presidency, the Interior Minister, the Minister of Civil Affairs, the Minister of Finance, the Minister of Foreign Affairs and the National Security Advisor.

=== Establishment of the Judicial Police Force ===
On 12 July 2005, Prime Minister Ahmed Qurei established a Judicial Police Force under the responsibility of the Minister of Interior and National Security (at the time Nasser Yousef). The new force was part of the Civil Police Force and its tasks were inter alia described as: implement decisions of the courts and the Public Prosecution; protect the buildings housing the courts, the judges and the Public Prosecution; and transport and protect persons held in custody and convicts. A Judicial Police subject to the Public Prosecution's Attorney-General already existed in 1995 since the Oslo Accords.

=== 2006–2007 internal power struggle ===
Hamas won the parliamentary elections of January 2006 and formed a Hamas-led government in March, leading to a power struggle over the security services with the Fatah Abbas presidency. It appears, President Abbas tried to remove the Fatah-dominated security organizations from the control of the Government, and, with the support of Western governments, restore the old structure of the security sector as it had existed under Arafat.

In March 2006, Said Seyam (member of Hamas) became the new PA Interior Minister, replacing Nasser Yousef. However, already on 20 February media reported that President Abbas had named the Fatah-affiliated Rashid Abu Shbak head of the internal security in the West Bank and the Gaza Strip. The outgoing Interior Minister Nasser Yousef denied the reports. On 6 April 2006, one week after Hamas had formed government, Abbas appointed the Fatah-affiliated Rashid Abu Shbak head of the three security agencies, including the Preventive Security, Civil Police and Civil Defence (Public Security). Abu Shbak said he was authorized to hire and fire officers in the three security branches. Though Seyam would technically be Abu Shbak's boss, any dispute between the two would be resolved in the Abbas-headed National Security Council. Also, in April 2006, Abbas created under his own control a new Public Administration for the crossing points and borders. The Presidential Guard was expanded and provided with rapid-intervention capabilities.

==== Executive Force ====
After President Abbas took direct control of the PA security forces, the Hamas government formed its own 3,000 strong paramilitary police force in the Gaza Strip, called Executive Force, which was made up of members of its own military wing, the Izz ad-Din al-Qassam Brigades. On 20 April, Interior Minister Said Seyam appointed Jamal Abu Samhadana, the head of the militant Popular Resistance Committees, Director General of Executive Force. Hamas sought to include members of all the resistance branches (and thereby gain at least some control over the groups).

The first men were deployed on 17 May 2006. However, on 8 June 2006, Abu Samhadana, as leader of the PRC, was assassinated by Israeli forces. In January 2007, Abbas outlawed the Interior Ministry's Executive Force. The Ministry resisted Abbas' order that by then 6,000 members of Executive Force be incorporated into the security apparatus loyal to the president's Fatah movement. Instead, Hamas announced plans to double the size of its force to 12,000 men.

Executive Force, as well as Hamas' armed wing Izz ad-Din al-Qassam Brigades, took part in the Hamas takeover of Gaza in June 2007. On 18 June 2007, Abbas dissolved the Hamas-led PA Government and the National Security Council.

=== Budget and strength ===
In 2013, the PA's security budget was almost $1 billion, comprising 28 percent of the total budget. The large defense budget has been criticized because it is seen as part of the internal oppression system, as well as maintaining the crumbling Fatah movement's hegemony and the status quo with Israel. Some 65,000 of the PA's civil servants (41%) were registered as defense workers; 34,000 were not Hamas government employees in Gaza.

As of November 2014, there were about 17,000 military employees in Gaza, including policemen, who were hired by Hamas since June 2007. They were still considered illegitimate by the Palestinian unity government of 2014 and therefore not paid.

As of January 2005, the number of Palestinian Authority security forces was, according to Associated Press, about 30,000. The division was as follows:

- Palestinian National Security Forces (Palestinian border police, military intelligence, military police and the elite Force 17 presidential security unit): about 15,000 members
- General Intelligence (collecting information and security for Palestinian diplomatic missions abroad): about 5,000 members in Gaza
- Palestinian Civil Police Force (Gaza's police force and preventive security agency meant to fight internal crime, at the time under responsibility of the Interior Minister): about 10,000 members

== Tasks ==
The 2003 Amended Basic Law (Article 84) states:

"The Security Forces and the Police are regular forces. They are the armed forces in the country. Their functions are limited to defending the country, serving the people, protecting society and maintaining public order, security and public morals."

The National Security Forces and the Presidential Guard are the PA's paramilitary forces, to some extent resembling an army. Before the Israeli blockade of the Gaza Strip, the PA maintained a small Coast Guard, using 5 motorboats equipped with machine guns along the Gazan seacoast. Before Israel destroyed the Gazan airport, there was also a small Aerial Police.

Police tasks are performed by the Civil Police Force, known as the Blue Police for its uniform color. Additionally, there are some other small civil forces. The Preventive Security Force is a large unit of the PA's intelligence. The intelligence division is divided into General Intelligence, Military Intelligence (Istikhbarat) and Military Police Intelligence.

== Crackdown on Palestinians ==
A February 2016 report of the Geneva-based Euro-Mediterranean Human Rights Monitor (Euro-Med Monitor) documented 1,274 arbitrary detentions in the West Bank in 2015 and 1,089 summonses by the Palestinian Security Services. The human rights violations targeted mostly individuals affiliated with Hamas or who opposed PA policies, including about 35 journalists and human rights activists, 476 university students, and 67 teachers/professors. Twenty-seven percent of the arrests lasted for a month or more. As the most serious violations were mentioned the refusal to implement court rulings ordering the release or acquittal of detainees. Medical reports confirmed the systematic practice of torture in Palestinian Authority jails in the West Bank. The number of human rights violations committed by PA authorities in the West Bank was significantly greater than the similar violations for which Hamas was responsible in Gaza. In both, West Bank and Gaza people were arrested or summoned for posting or liking messages on social media, primarily on Facebook, critical of respectively the PA or Hamas.

In March 2016, the London-based Arab Organisation for Human Rights in the UK (AOHR-UK) reported that in 2015, PA security forces in the West Bank arbitrarily arrested or summoned 1,715 civilians. They included students, journalists, women and children. Nearly 1,000 detainees were Palestinians who were previously released from Israeli jails. The report stated that 37 detainees were tortured, some held in solitary confinement for several months. Eleven Palestinians were even held in administrative detention (without charge). The bulk of the arrests and summons, while violating Human Rights, were carried out by the Preventive Security Force and the General Intelligence. Sometimes, the forces used live bullets to intimidate Palestinians. The forces often did not comply with court orders for the release of detainees. Security forces were also accused of seizing personal belongings and property of arrested persons. Four Palestinians were taken hostage to force members of their families to hand themselves in. Security forces even charged Palestinians held in Israeli prisons; judges considered them fugitives for failing to appear in court, while being held in Israeli jails. The AOHR-UK report stressed that only a fraction of the total cases of human rights abuses in Palestine was represented in the report.

In 2015, at least 33 peaceful protests were allegedly crushed in the West Bank. In September 2015, security forces dispersed a march of protesters who demonstrated against excessive use of force by PA security forces against demonstrators.

== Security cooperation with Israel ==
Security cooperation between Israel and Palestine involves the sharing of intelligence between the Palestinian Authority and the Israeli army.

The cooperation originates from the Oslo Accords. A Palestinian Civil Police Force was established pursuant to Oslo II, Article XII, a "Joint Coordination and Cooperation Committee for Mutual Security Purposes", "to guarantee public order and internal security for the Palestinians of the West Bank and the Gaza Strip".

While Israeli security officials regularly praised the cooperation, critics say that the agreement was very much focused on creating a structure which would primarily ensure the security of Israel. Leaked documents in the Palestine Papers revealed that the PA was willing to go as far as to kill its own people in order to prove that it was establishing law and order in territories under its control. Mazin Qumsiyeh, a civil society leader in Bethlehem, said the Oslo Accords had effectively turned the PA into a ″security sub-contractor″, and ″the job of the Palestinian security forces is to enforce the occupation on Israel's behalf″.

On numerous occasions, President Abbas has threatened to end the security cooperation to show firmness to end the Israeli occupation, however without ever taking concrete steps. In October 2014, Israeli journalist Khaled Abu Toameh calculated that Abbas had used the threat 58 times. In May 2014, Abbas declared that the security cooperation with Israel is sacred. In March 2015, the PLO Central Council formally decided to end the security coordination, but eventually, the decision was not implemented.

=== 2015–2016 operations ===
Since the new uprising that begun in October 2015 the Palestinian police seemed to show less willingness to suppress protests against the occupation. In December 2015, the Palestinian police even for the first time evicted Israeli Border Police who had raided Beitunia, a suburb of Ramallah in Area A, which formally is under exclusive security control by the Palestinians.

Nevertheless, commander of the Palestinian Intelligence in the West Bank Majid Faraj revealed in January 2016, that the Security Forces since October 2015 had prevented some 200 "terrorist attacks" against Israel and arrested about 100 Palestinians on suspicion of planning attacks against Israelis. It triggered a wave of denunciations from Palestinian factions that are strongly opposed to security coordination with Israel. A spokesman of Hamas said that the PA security forces played a role in serving the security of the occupation and combating the Palestinian intifada, and that “Protecting the security of the occupation has become part of the ideology of the Palestinian security forces”. Fatah's military wing, the Al-Aqsa Martyrs' Brigades, on the contrary, defended the Intelligence chief.

=== Criticism on security cooperation ===
Palestinian security forces have often been criticized for suppressing their own people and crushing the resistance to the Israeli occupation. They targeted the armed resistance as well as political opposition and protesters. Hamas supporters were targeted, as well as Fatah members.

In 2008, the head of the Palestinian Civil Police presented the Israelis with a laundry list of actions taken by the PA against Hamas. In the West Bank, Hamas members are frequently arrested, as were students supporting Hamas.

== See also ==
- Palestinian Civil Defence
- Palestinian Civil Police Force
- Palestinian National Security Forces
- Palestinian Presidential Guard
- Palestinian Preventive Security
- Ministry of Interior of Palestine
- United States security assistance to the Palestinian National Authority

== Sources ==
- Roland Friedrich, Arnold Luethold and Firas Milhem, The Security Sector Legislation of the Palestinian National Authority (3,2 MB). Geneva Centre for the Democratic Control of Armed Forces (DCAF), January 2008. On website
- Friedrich et al., Entry-points to Palestinian Security Sector Reform. DCAF, 2007 ISBN 9789292220617
