= Nabil Shaath =

Politician of Palestine (born 1938)

Nabil Shaath نبيل شعث
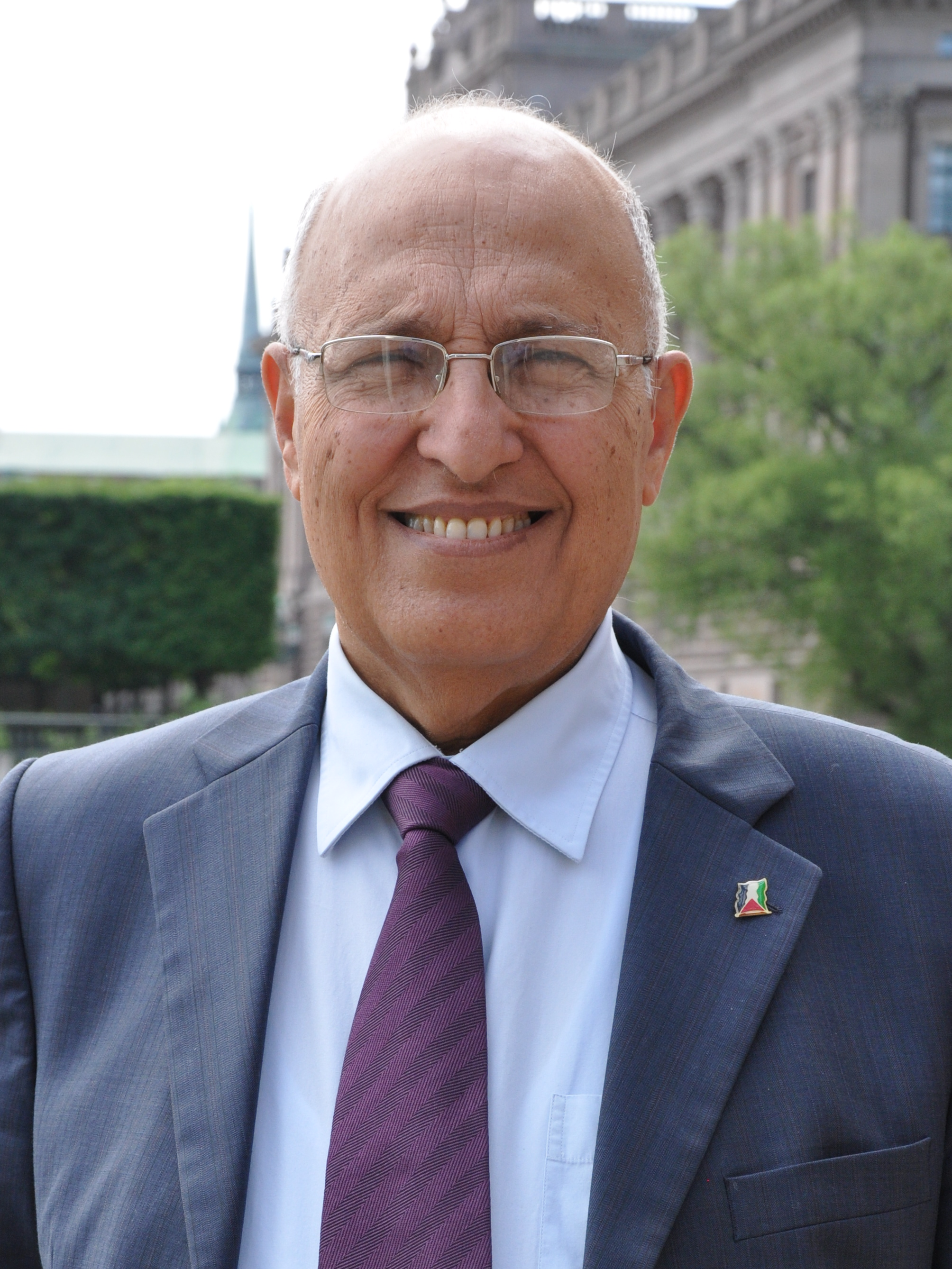
- Shaath in 2010

Acting Prime Minister of the Palestinian National Authority
- In office 15 December 2005 – 24 December 2005
- President: Mahmoud Abbas
- Preceded by: Ahmed Qurei
- Succeeded by: Ahmed Qurei

Deputy Prime Minister of the Palestinian National Authority
- In office 24 February 2005 – 3 January 2006
- Prime Minister: Ahmed Qurei
- Preceded by: Office established
- Succeeded by: Nasser al-Shaer

Minister of Information
- In office 24 February 2005 – 3 January 2006
- Prime Minister: Ahmed Qurei
- Preceded by: Saeb Erekat
- Succeeded by: Yousef Rizqa

Acting Minister of Culture
- In office 7 October 2003 – 12 November 2003
- Prime Minister: Ahmed Qurei
- Preceded by: Ziad Abu Amr
- Succeeded by: Yahya Yakhlif

Minister of Foreign Affairs and Expatriates
- In office 30 April 2003 – 24 February 2005
- Prime Minister: Mahmoud Abbas; Ahmed Qurei
- Preceded by: "Position established"
- Succeeded by: Nasser al-Qudwa

Minister of Planning and International Cooperation
- In office 5 July 1994 – 30 April 2003
- President: Yasser Arafat
- Preceded by: Office established
- Succeeded by: Nabeel Kassis

Personal details
- Born: 9 August 1938 (age 88) Safad, Mandatory Palestine
- Party: Fatah
- Education: Alexandria University; University of Pennsylvania

Nabil Ali Muhammad (Abu Rashid) Shaath (Arabic: نبيل شعث, Nabīl Shaʿath ; born 9 August 1938 in Safad) is a Palestinian politician, banker, management and development expert.

== Academic career ==
Shaath received his master's degree in finance from the Wharton School of the University of Pennsylvania and his PhD. in economics from the University of Pennsylvania School of Arts and Sciences. He taught at the university from 1961 to 1965.

== Political career ==
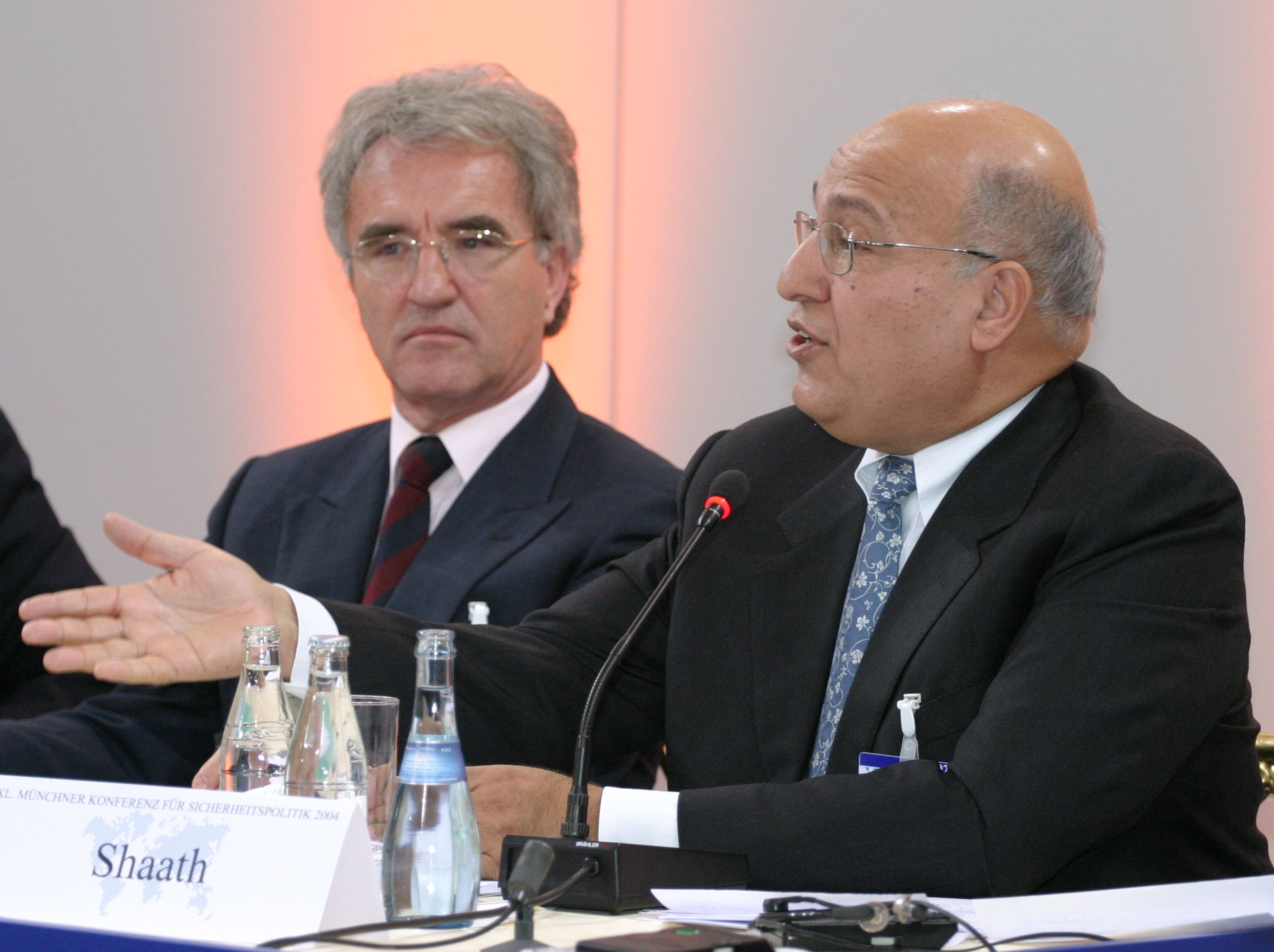
Nabil Shaath (R), 2004

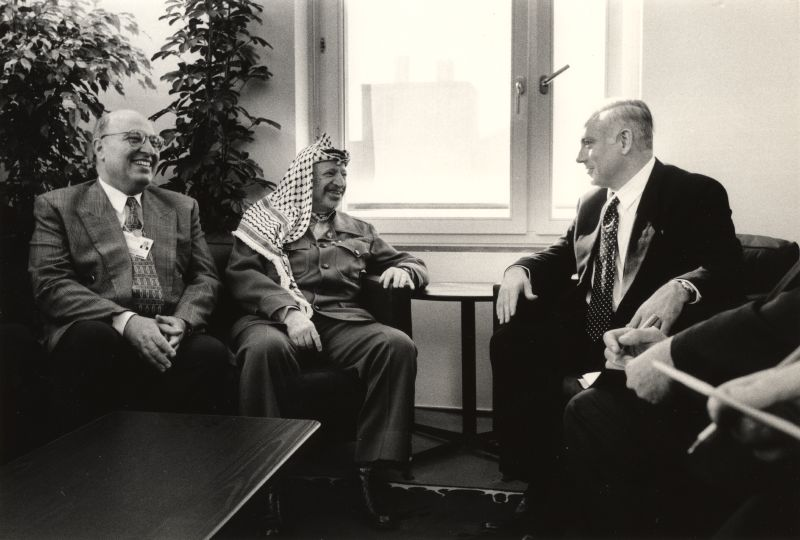
Nabil Shaath (L) with Yasser Arafat and Benjamin Netanyahu at the World Economic Forum in Davos, 1997

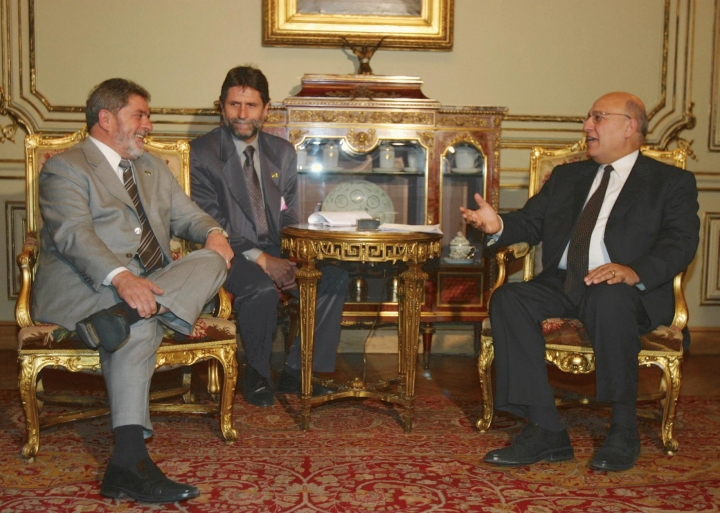
With the President of Brazil, Lula da Silva

Shaath has served as Palestinian chief negotiator, Palestinian International Co-operation Minister, Planning Minister for the Palestinian National Authority and Acting Prime Minister of the PNA. Shaath led the coordinating committee of the Palestinian delegation to the Oslo I Accord talks in Washington, D.C. Shaath also served as the Palestinian Authority's first foreign minister from April 2003 to February 2005.

Shaath was a Deputy Prime Minister and Minister of Information in the Palestinian Authority Government of February 2005. On 15 December 2005, he became Acting Prime Minister of the Palestinian Authority after Ahmed Qurei resigned. He lost that position nine days later when Qurei returned to office.

== Awards and recognition ==
Shaath appeared in the 2009 documentary Back Door Channels: The Price of Peace about the peace treaty between Israel and Egypt. The film was released by Channel Productions in New York City.

== See also ==
- List of Fatah members
- Salah Al-Zawawi

Political offices
New office	Minister of Planning and International Cooperation; 1994–2003	Succeeded by Nabeel Kassis
Vacant Title last held by Jamal al-Husayni	Minister of Foreign Affairs and Expatriates; 2003–2005	Succeeded by Nasser al-Qudwa
Preceded by Ziad Abu Amr	Minister of Culture; Acting; 2003	Succeeded by Yahya Yakhlif
Preceded by Saeb Erekat	Minister of Information; 2005–2006	Succeeded by Yousef Rizqa
New office	Deputy Prime Minister of the Palestinian National Authority; 2005–2006	Succeeded by Nasser al-Shaer
Preceded by Ahmed Qurei	Prime Minister of the Palestinian National Authority; Acting; 2005	Succeeded by Ahmed Qurei
