= Fatah-Hamas Agreement =

Fatah-Hamas Agreement may refer to:

- Fatah–Hamas Mecca Agreement, 2007
- Fatah–Hamas Doha Agreement, 2012
- 2012 Fatah–Hamas Cairo Agreement
- 2014 Fatah–Hamas Agreements
- 2017 Fatah–Hamas Agreement
- 2020 Palestinian reconciliation agreement
- 2022 Palestinian reconciliation agreement

== See also ==
- Fatah–Hamas reconciliation process
- Palestinian Cairo Declaration
- Palestinian Prisoners' Document
- 2024 Beijing Declaration
