= 2022 Palestinian reconciliation agreement =

Algeria-mediated treaty between Palestinian political organizations

Algerian Document for Palestinian Reconciliation الورقة الجزائرية للمصالحة الفلسطينية
- Context: Ending the Fatah–Hamas conflict
- Signed: 13 October 2022; 3 years ago
- Location: Algiers, Algeria
- Mediators: Algeria
- Parties: 14, including: Fatah; Hamas; PFLP; Palestinian National Initiative; Palestinian People's Party
- Language: Arabic

The 2022 Palestinian reconciliation agreement, officially the Algerian Document for Palestinian Reconciliation (Arabic: الورقة الجزائرية للمصالحة الفلسطينية) and also referred to as the Algiers Declaration (إعلان الجزائر), was signed by 14 different Palestinian political organizations, including Fatah and Hamas. It was brokered in Algiers as part of the Fatah–Hamas reconciliation process, though it has not been successful in ending the Fatah–Hamas conflict, which began in the aftermath of the 2006 Palestinian legislative election and the subsequent 2007 Hamas takeover of the Gaza Strip. Months of talks leading to the deal were conducted in Algeria in preparation for the 2022 Arab League summit.

The agreement included provisions to hold a presidential election and a parliamentary election within a year of signing. However, no new elections were held throughout 2023: Palestinian president Mahmoud Abbas, who has been in power since 2005, has repeatedly delayed or called off new election efforts, citing the exclusion of potential Palestinian voters in Israeli-annexed East Jerusalem, among other factors, though analysts have suggested that his presidency's unpopularity among the Palestinian populace has been the real reason for the years-long delay. As the deadline for the agreement approached, the Hamas-led attack on Israel took place on 7 October 2023, sparking the Gaza war and rendering the deal ineffectual.

== Background ==
=== Fatah and Hamas ===
Fatah and Hamas are currently the two largest of the Palestinian factions. Founded in 1969, Fatah is the leading member of the Palestinian Liberation Organization (PLO), which is an umbrella organization consisting of several movements. It takes a moderate stance on the conflict with Israel, favouring a two-state solution in which a Palestinian state would be established in the West Bank and the Gaza Strip, with East Jerusalem as its capital city.

Hamas, on the other hand, is a Sunni Islamist movement founded in 1987 that advocates for the destruction of Israel. It is, in whole or in part, designated as a terrorist organization by several countries, including the United States. However, in recent years, Hamas has accepted the proposal of a Palestinian state in the West Bank and Gaza Strip as a temporary solution to the conflict.

=== 2006 Palestinian legislative election and 2007 Fatah–Hamas conflict ===
The Fatah–Hamas conflict started in the aftermath of the legislative elections of 2006, in which Hamas participated, winning 74 out of 132 seats. Fatah refused to cooperate with the Hamas government, led by Ismail Haniyeh. Tensions boiled on 10 June 2007, when armed clashes between Fatah and Hamas forces erupted in the Gaza strip. By 15 June, the Gaza strip was, in its entirety, under the control of Hamas militants.

=== 2007–2022 agreements of the Fatah–Hamas reconciliation process ===
Prior to 2022, there have been several attempts at reconciliation between Fatah and Hamas, with Egypt and Qatar serving as mediators. A number of agreements have been reached and implemented to various degrees, such as the Sana'a Declaration in 2008, the Fatah–Hamas Doha Agreement in 2012, the Gaza and Cairo agreements in 2014, the 2020 agreement as well as three agreements held in Cairo – in 2011, 2012 and 2017. After the last one Palestinian Authority President Mahmoud Abbas postponed elections without setting a new date, reportedly due to fear the Israeli government will not allow voting in East Jerusalem.

== Negotiations ==
In January 2022, Hamas announced that a delegation headed by Ismail Haniyeh would be going to Algeria for "Palestinian unity talks," after receiving an invitation from the Algerian ambassador in Qatar, where Haniyeh is based.

In July 2022, Mahmoud Abbas, leader of Fatah and President of the Palestinian National Authority, held a public meeting with Haniyeh for the first time in more than five years in Algiers, the capital city of Algeria. Hamas hailed the "historic" meeting.

In September 2022, it was reported that delegations from Fatah and Hamas have headed to Algeria to conduct of talks on reconciliation.

== Agreement ==
A number of media outlets in the Arab world have released the text of the agreement, which was officially signed at a ceremony on 13 October 2022 in Algiers. The agreement included the following provisions:

- The affirmation that the Palestine Liberation Organization is the sole legitimate representative of the Palestinian people, and the adoption of national dialogue to ensure the involvement of all factions to the organization.
- Elections to the Palestinian National Council, the legislative body of the PLO, would be held within a year of signing the agreement. (Algeria offered to host the meetings of the council after its election, a proposal which "was appreciated of all the factions participating in the conference.")
- Presidential and parliamentary elections for the Palestinian National Authority would be held in the Gaza Strip and the West Bank, including the city of Jerusalem, within a year of signing the agreement. (The agreement described Jerusalem as "the capital of the Palestinian state," without specifically mentioning East Jerusalem, which is the capital of Palestine in the two-state solution, while West Jerusalem's status is ambiguous in such a settlement.)
- An "Algerian Arab team" would be responsible for overseeing the implementation of the agreement.

The agreement was signed by 14 Palestinian factions.

== Reactions ==
Azzam al-Ahmad, the head of Fatah's delegation to Algiers, said that the factions "signed this agreement to get rid of the malignant cancer of division that has entered the Palestinian body," and expressed his movement's optimism "that the agreement is implemented and will not remain ink on paper."

Ismail Haniyeh, the leader of Hamas, said, "It is a day of joy in Palestine and Algeria and for those who love the Palestinian cause, but a day of sadness for the Zionist entity."

Algerian president Abdelmadjid Tebboune attended the signing ceremony, hailing the agreement and saying that the Palestinian state "went through setbacks, problems and conspiracies, but today, Alhamdulillah, we witness a historic day."

Mustafa Barghouti, secretary-general of the Palestinian National Initialtive, told the CNN that "it was agreed to elect the Palestinian National Council at home and abroad, using a proportional representation system with the participation of all Palestinian factions, within a maximum period of one year from the date of signing the declaration."
