= 2017 Fatah–Hamas Agreement =

The 2017 Fatah–Hamas Agreement is a reconciliation agreement signed between Fatah and Hamas on 12 October 2017. The agreement was brokered by Egypt, and signed in Cairo. The deal was signed by the leader of the Fatah delegation Azzam al-Ahmad and Hamas deputy politburo chief Salah al-Arouri.

Leading up to the agreement, Hamas announced on 17 September 2017 that it was dissolving its Supreme Administrative Committee in response to Egypt's efforts as part of the Fatah–Hamas reconciliation process.

Hamas was due to hand over control of Gaza by 1 December 2017. Both Hamas and Fatah requested Egypt that takeover be delayed to 10 December.

As at January 2018, the parties have failed to implement the deal, arguing over the interpretation of its details and missing deadlines it set. The most contested issue between Hamas and Fatah is the future of the weapons of terrorist groups in Gaza. Hamas has said it will not accept any group conceding its weapons. Meanwhile, PA President and Fatah Chairman Mahmoud Abbas has said he would only agree to a scenario in which the PA security forces control all of Gaza's weapons.

In early March 2018, an Egyptian security delegation was to arrive in Gaza to follow up on the stalled reconciliation efforts.

== Details ==
In the agreement, it is stipulated that Hamas gives Fatah full civilian control of the Gaza Strip, and in return the economic blockade of Gaza is to ease.

The agreement arises because in the last few months, Hamas had been under heavy pressure from the Palestinian National Authority. Punitive measures included cutting salaries of Palestinian Authority employees living in Gaza and reducing the electricity supply to the Gaza Strip, which was already suffering from an electricity crisis due to the Egyptian and Israeli blockade.

The agreement stipulates that legislative, presidential and national council elections should be conducted within one year of its signing. The deal would also see both Hamas and Fatah form an interim government before the elections.

Under the agreement 3,000 Palestinian Authority police officers are to be placed in the Gaza Strip. The head of the Palestinian Authority delegation Azzam al-Ahmad said that the Rafah border crossing between Egypt and Gaza would be operated by the presidential guards of PA President Mahmoud Abbas by 1 November 2017.

== See also ==
- Fatah–Hamas reconciliation process (2005–2022)
- 2014 Fatah–Hamas Agreements
- 2012 Fatah–Hamas Cairo Agreement
- Fatah–Hamas Doha Agreement (2012)
- Fatah–Hamas Mecca Agreement (2007)
- Palestinian National Unity Government of March 2007
