= 2024 Beijing Declaration =

Agreement signed by Palestinian factions in China

Beijing Declaration
Beijing Declaration on Ending Division and Strengthening Palestinian National Unity
- Type: Inter-Palestinian agreement
- Signed: 23 July 2024
- Location: Beijing, China
- Parties: Palestinian National Liberation Movement (Fatah); Islamic Resistance Movement (Hamas); Democratic Front for the Liberation of Palestine; Popular Front for the Liberation of Palestine; Islamic Jihad Movement in Palestine; Palestinian People's Party; Palestinian Popular Struggle Front; Palestinian National Initiative; Popular Front for the Liberation of Palestine – General Command; Palestinian Democratic Union; Palestinian Liberation Front; Arab Liberation Front; Palestinian Arab Front; Vanguard for the Popular Liberation War - Lightning Forces (As-Sa'iqa)

The Beijing Declaration on Ending Division and Strengthening Palestinian National Unity, (Note: Arabic: إعلان بكين لإنهاء الانقسام وتعزيز الوحدة الوطنية الفلسطينية, romanized: Iʿlān Bikīn li-Inhāʾ al-Inqisām wa-Taʿzīz al-Waḥdah al-Waṭaniyyah al-Filasṭīniyyah; Chinese: 关于结束分裂加强巴勒斯坦民族团结的北京宣言; pinyin: Guānyú Jiéshù Fēnliè Jiāqiáng Bālèsītǎn Mínzú Tuánjié de Běijīng Xuānyán.) commonly known as the Beijing Declaration, is an agreement signed on 23 July 2024 by 14 different Palestinian factions, including Fatah and Hamas, as part of the reconciliation process between the two factions in a conflict that started in the aftermath of the 2006 Palestinian legislative elections and included the 2007 Hamas takeover of Gaza.

== Background ==
Following the outbreak of the Israeli invasion on Gaza in October 2023, the Israeli military advanced into the Gaza Strip. Over the course of the war, a United Nations agency and international organisations including Amnesty International have found that Israel is committing genocide in Gaza. This crisis prompted the Palestinian Authority in Ramallah and the Hamas leadership to try to reach a new agreement on a unity government with the goal of reaching a common plan of action for the eventual reconstruction of the Gaza Strip. Previous such agreements have never been fully implemented.

Fatah and Hamas are currently the two largest of the Palestinian factions. Founded in 1959, Fatah is the leading member of the Palestine Liberation Organization (PLO), which is an umbrella organization consisting of several movements. It takes a moderate stance on the conflict with Israel, favoring a two-state solution where the Palestinian state would be built on the West Bank and Gaza Strip, with East Jerusalem as its capital.

Hamas, on the other hand, is a Sunni Islamist movement founded in 1987, that advocates for one Palestinian state in the entire territory. However, in recent years Hamas has accepted a Palestinian state in the West Bank and Gaza as a temporary solution to the conflict, supporting the pre-1967 borders in its 2017 charter.

== Negotiations ==
The government of the People's Republic of China offered the Palestinian factions its offices to try to reach an agreement, and in July 2024, representatives of 14 Palestinian organizations met in Beijing, China. On July 23, they concluded a new agreement on unity government.

The most prominent highlight in the deal is a plan to form an interim national reconciliation government around the governance of Gaza after the war with Israel, as well as of the West Bank, Director of the Office of the Central Foreign Affairs Commission Wang Yi said. Wang further described the meeting as a "historic moment for the cause of Palestine’s liberation".

The negotiations were witnessed by envoys from Egypt, Algeria, Saudi Arabia, Qatar, Jordan, Syria, Lebanon, Russia, and Turkey.

== Agreement ==
According to the declaration, the factions agreed to achieve "a comprehensive Palestinian national unity that includes all Palestinian factions under the PLO framework, and to commit to the establishment of an independent Palestinian state with Jerusalem as its capital [...] with the help of Egypt, Algeria, China and Russia". They stated that this would take the form of a temporary national unity government. They further "agreed to deploy all efforts to lift the Israeli blockade on Gaza and ensure the unimpeded delivery of humanitarian aid into the enclave".

The declaration also stressed the Palestinian people's right to resist the Israeli occupation in accordance with international law and the United Nations charter and to thwart any attempts to displace Palestinians from their land.

== Reactions ==
=== Palestinian factions ===
- Palestine: The President of the Palestinian Authority, Mahmoud Abbas, welcomed the Beijing Declaration, stating that it is "completely consistent with the Palestinian position and international legitimacy" and appreciating "China's efforts to help the State of Palestine obtain its full membership of the United Nations and to hold an international peace conference to implement the two-state solution, a step conducive to ending the occupation and realize the establishment of the Palestinian state".
- Hamas: Musa Abu Marzouk, head of the International Relations Office of Hamas and one of the negotiators of the agreement, explained to the media that "We will strive to implement what we signed with Fatah. We hope that the Beijing Declaration will not be like previous agreements". Husam Badran, head of Hamas's national relations office, said that the agreement represented "the best and most suitable response to the Palestinian situation after the war, serving as a barricade against all regional and international interventions that seek to impose realities contrary to the interests of our people in managing Palestinian affairs".
- Palestinian Islamic Jihad: The Palestinian Islamic Jihad rejected the version of the declaration's text circulating on the web as "inaccurate and mendacious", adding that it would refuse to sign "any agreement which, by including international resolutions, might lead to recognition of the usurping Zionist regime, which has developed plans to destroy the Palestinian cause".
- Palestinian National Initiative: Mustafa Barghouti, secretary-general of the Palestinian National Initiative, said that the declaration is more far-reaching than earlier agreements between the Palestinian factions. He stated that it is mainly important because it "blocks Israeli efforts to create some sort of collaborative structure against Palestinian interests".
- Popular Front for the Liberation of Palestine: The Deputy Secretary-General of the Popular Front for the Liberation of Palestine, Jamil Mazhar, considered the Beijing Declaration an advanced step towards Palestinian unity, stressing that it "constitutes a new phase, and it is necessary to build on it with practical and executive measure".

=== Other countries ===
- China: In the aftermath of the declaration, Chinese diplomat and ambassador to Qatar Cao Xiaolin called it a "key step to resolve the Palestinian question", adding that "Palestinian unity is key to the realisation of Palestinian statehood and China is committed to facilitating it".
- Egypt: Egyptian Foreign Ministry spokesman Ahmed Abu Zeid tweeted that "Egypt hails all international and regional efforts that aim to reach a Palestinian national reconciliation, last of which were the appreciated efforts of friendly China." He added that "the unity of the Palestinian line in this critical moment of the nation's history is extremely significant for achieving the dream of an independent Palestinian state."
- Germany: German Foreign Minister Annalena Baerbock voiced scepticism towards the declaration and called on Hamas to release all hostages and endorse the peace initiative proposed by the United States.
- Israel: Minister of Foreign Affairs Israel Katz criticized Mahmoud Abbas, tweeting "Instead of rejecting terrorism, [PA President] Mahmoud Abbas embraces the murderers and rapists of Hamas, revealing his true face".
- Malaysia: Prime Minister Anwar Ibrahim said that "China's role in the Middle East peace process is commendable and important to achieving Palestinian solidarity". The uniting of various Palestinian factions under the Beijing Declaration is a crucial step toward realizing the rights of the Palestinian people, he said in a statement, adding he "commend[ed] the government of the People's Republic of China for facilitating talks".
- Oman: The Foreign Ministry expressed Oman's welcome of the agreement. Its statement stressed "the importance of uniting the Palestinian ranks and empowering them by all political and diplomatic means to push for an end to the Israeli occupation of the Palestinian territories and achieve justice by establishing an independent Palestinian state on the 1967 borders".
- Pakistan: Prime Minister Shehbaz Sharif endorsed the declaration. He commended China's diplomatic efforts and expressed hope for enduring peace. Sharif reiterated Pakistan's support for the Palestinian cause and called for a two-state solution.
- Qatar: The Ministry of Foreign Affairs, in a statement on 25 July, described the agreement as "an important step towards unity and consolidating the national project to establish an independent Palestinian State on the 1967 borders, with East Jerusalem (Al-Quds) as its capital". The ministry also affirmed Qatari support "for all steps aimed at overcoming differences and ending division, as well as its aspiration for the sustainability of unity and partnership among the Palestinian brothers" and praised the role of China in the talks.
- Russia: Russian Foreign Ministry spokeswoman Maria Zakharova expressed Russia's support for the agreement, emphasizing "the importance of Palestinian unity and the administrative and political integrity of the Palestinian territories within the 1967 borders as essential" for the Israeli–Palestinian peace process. She confirmed Russia's readiness "to continue to vigorously assist the Palestinians in this effort, including in close coordination with our Chinese colleagues and regional partners."
- Turkey: Turkey welcomed Palestinian political factions coming together in the Chinese capital Beijing, accepting declaration aimed at achieving national unity. “We welcome the gathering of Palestinian political factions in Beijing at the invitation of the Government of the People's Republic of China (PRC) and their acceptance of a declaration aimed at achieving national unity,” the Foreign Ministry said in a statement. The statement also hailed China's contributions to the reconciliation process among different Palestinian factions. "In the current conditions, where Israel's attacks in Gaza persist with full force and incursions intensify in the West Bank and East Jerusalem, the importance and urgency of achieving political unity in Palestine have escalated." The statement expressed Ankara's expectation on the implementation of the steps outlined in the declaration adopted in Beijing. Turkey expects the longstanding efforts aimed at achieving political unity in Palestine to yield positive results “as soon as possible,” the statement added.
- United States: Spokesperson for the United States Department of State Matthew Miller criticized the reconciliation agreement, stating that Hamas cannot play a part in Palestinian political life and citing the American designation of Hamas as a terrorist group.

=== International organizations ===
- Arab League: In a statement, Arab League assistant secretary-general for Palestine and occupied Arab territories affairs, Saeed Abu Ali, appreciated China's historical position in support of the Palestinian cause, which embodies the depth and strength of relations between Arab countries and China. He said the Arab League commended the efforts and initiatives of the Chinese leadership, and its continued keenness to support the rights of the Palestinian people. Abu Ali also praised China's efforts to strengthen the Palestinian peoples' just and legitimate struggle for an independent, sovereign Palestinian state on the 1967 borders with East Jerusalem as its capital, in accordance with the relevant decisions of international legitimacy and the Arab Peace Initiative.
- European Union: High Representative of the Union for Foreign Affairs and Security Policy Josep Borrell praised the Beijing Declaration stating that a Fatah–Hamas agreement was "a significant development that requires support".
- Organization of Islamic Cooperation: The General Secretariat of the Organization of Islamic Cooperation (OIC) welcomed the signing in a statement on 25 July, describing it as "important and positive on the path to ending the division and restoring national unity, which contributes to accomplishing the goals of the Palestinian people in achieving their legitimate rights". It additionally expressed support for China's historical positions regarding Palestine.
- United Nations: According to UN Spokesperson Stéphane Dujarric, UN Secretary-General António Guterres "very much welcomes the signing of the Beijing Declaration by the Palestinian factions", adding that it was "an important step towards furthering Palestinian unity."

== Analysis ==
=== Role of China ===
In hosting the conference, analysts including Foreign Policy reporter Amy Mackinnon saw China as seeking to position itself as a rival mediator to the United States in the Middle East. Similarly, Palestinian China expert Razan Shawamreh said China aimed "to gain consent and acknowledgment among regional countries regarding its rising status as a responsible country with a superior moral role compared to the US". RUSI associate fellow Sari Arho Havrén stated China "positioned itself as a peacemaker and a viable alternative to the US".

Analyst Dominika Urhová described the Beijing Declaration as a continuation of earlier Chinese attempts to play a prominent diplomatic role in the area, citing the five-point peace plan which China proposed at the United Nations Security Council in November 2023. However, she also observed that China is engaging more directly with the Palestinian groups than before, instead of remaining "careful not to alienate Israel".

Hani al-Masri, director of the Palestinian Centre for Policy Research and Strategic Studies (Masarat), suggested that Mahmoud Abbas - by engaging in a China-led agreement - "wants to show the Americans and also the Arabs that ‘I have other choices’". Masri linked this to the looming prospect of Donald Trump's reelection as well as a recent Israeli bill that rejected Palestinian statehood. According to him, Fatah hopes to use the agreement as leverage "in case it is denied leadership of post-war Gaza". Masri was also more sceptical about the perceived shift in Chinese policy towards a more pro-Palestinian stance, stating that China has not made any steps to "punish Israel, with whom it has special relations" within the UN or other international organisations.

=== Significance of the agreement ===
A number of Palestinian observers, including PNC member Hamadeh Faraneh and national affairs advisor for the Palestinian Authority Omar Al-Ghoul, acknowledged both the positives and the ambiguities of the agreement. Faraneh was especially critical about the prospect of unity as "Fatah monopolizes both the authority in Ramallah and the leadership of the PLO, and Hamas monopolizes Gaza". However, researcher Jehad Harb argued that the most surprising aspect of the declaration was the shift in Hamas's political thought, as it committed for the first time in an unambiguous way "to the establishment of a Palestinian state according to UN resolutions".

Some Western and international analysts of Palestinian politics dismissed the agreement as the latest in a series of symbolic documents, with no timetable of practical steps to be implemented so long as Hamas refused to dismantle its separate armed wing outside of official Palestinian control.

Jack Khoury of Haaretz cited a senior Fatah official as saying "the joint statement was mainly intended to show respect to the Chinese hosts, as in similar past conventions in Moscow and Algeria, and therefore it does not have much practical significance."

This scepticism was shared by Omar Karmi of The Electronic Intifada. Karmi criticized the declaration's "vagueness", its focus on a "technocratic" unity government, and the lack of a timeline for implementation. On the other hand, he also saw a limited potential for progress in the growing Chinese role as it could "offset Washington’s outsized influence over diplomacy on Palestine".

Palestinian journalist and author Ramzy Baroud reacted more positively to the declaration. In 2023, after an earlier visit by Abbas to Beijing, Baroud had been sceptical: "Palestinians need China, as they need other powerful players in the Global South, but it is not mediation that they desperately require. Mediations do not end military occupations or dismantle apartheid regimes." By contrast, he claimed that the 2024 Beijing Declaration "has allowed China to engage with all groups on an equal footing, without appearing to side with one group against the other". Baroud also stated that China was gradually ending its earlier "balancing act" between its diplomatic leading role and its economic interests (including those in Israel). According to him, since the war in Gaza started, the Chinese discourse had become "mostly committed to the rights of the Palestinian people".

Menachem Klein, professor of political science at Bar-Ilan University in Israel, said that the Beijing agreement is based on the 2012 Cairo agreement and the 2022 Algerian agreement but, "unlike its predecessors, contains political principles". Klein also stressed that the Chinese agreement, however, shows that "it is impossible to separate Hamas from the PA in Ramallah, and that key figures in Hamas are eventually embarking on the political path championed by Fatah and the PLO", explaining that "this is an opportunity to change the current miserable situation that must not be missed".

== See also ==
- Fatah–Hamas reconciliation process
