= 2020 Palestinian reconciliation agreement =

The 2020 Palestinian reconciliation agreement is an agreement signed by Fatah, Hamas and Palestinian Islamic Jihad in Istanbul as part of the reconciliation process between the two factions in a conflict that started in the aftermath of the 2006 Palestinian legislative elections and included the 2007 Hamas takeover of Gaza.

== Background ==
Following the Abraham Accords in 2020, signed between Israel and UAE and also between Israel and Bahrain, the Palestinian Authority in Ramallah and the Hamas government in Gaza decided to discuss reconciliation and bolster the Palestinian position internationally.

== Agreement ==
On 24 September 2020, Fatah and Hamas, along with other smaller Palestinian groups, gathered in Istanbul to sign an agreement to hold new elections within six months. The elections would first be for the Palestinian Legislative Council, then for the Palestinian presidency, and later for Fatah Central Committee.

== Aftermath ==
Following the conclusion of the reconciliation agreement, it was decided to hold legislative elections in the Palestinian Authority in May 2021. However, in April 2021, Palestinian President Mahmoud Abbas postponed elections without setting a new date, reportedly due to fear the Israeli government will not allow voting in East Jerusalem. Failure to carry out the reconciliation agreement led to a new round of negotiations, leading to the 2022 Palestinian reconciliation agreement.
