= Third Hamdallah Government =

Palestinian national unity government formed 2014

Palestinian Unity Government of June 2014
- Cabinet of Palestinian National Authority
- Date formed: 2 June 2014
- Date dissolved: 17 June 2015 (Initial Resignation); 17 October 2016 (Hamas forms de facto independent government); 13 April 2019 (Final Dissolution)

People and organisations
- Head of state: Mahmoud Abbas
- Head of government: Mahmoud Abbas
- Deputy head of government: Rami Hamdallah
- Member party: Independent
- Status in legislature: Unrecognized by the Legislative Council

History
- Predecessor: First and Second Hamdallah Governments (West Bank); Hamas government of 2012 (Gaza)
- Successor: Shtayyeh Government (West Bank); Hamas government of October 2016 (Gaza)

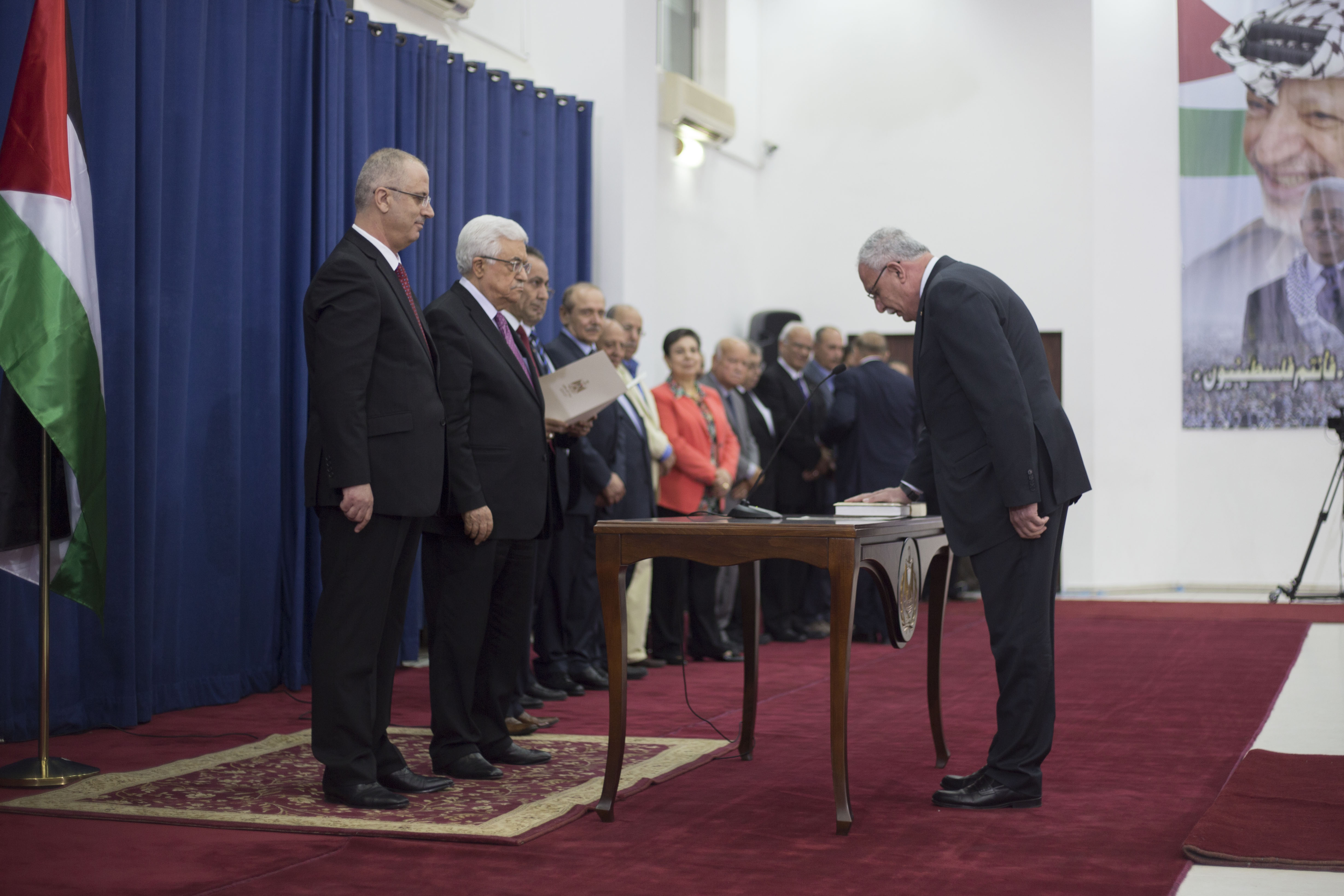
Riyad Al-Maliki the foreign minister swear in front of the Palestinian president Mahmoud Abbas, at Al-Muqata'a H.Q. in Ramallah.

The Palestinian Unity Government of June 2014 was a national unity government of the Palestinian National Authority under Palestinian President Mahmoud Abbas formed on 2 June 2014 following the Fatah-Hamas Reconciliation Agreement that had been signed on 23 April 2014. The ministers were nominally independent, but overwhelmingly seen as loyal to President Abbas and his Fatah movement or to smaller leftist factions, none of whom were believed to have close ties to Hamas. However, the Unity Government was not approved by the Legislative Council, leading to its legitimacy being questioned. The Unity Government dissolved on 17 June 2015 after President Abbas said it was unable to operate in the Gaza Strip.

Before the agreement, there were two separate governments, one ruled by Fatah in the West Bank and the other by Hamas in the Gaza Strip. Although this unity government formally was a government representing both Fatah and Hamas, the two parties remained hostile to each other as numerous reconciliation attempts have failed so far.

The international community agreed to work with the new government. While the US reaction was reserved, Israel condemned the unity government, stressing that Hamas is a terrorist organisation which has vowed to destroy the state of Israel.

In July and December 2015, Abbas reshuffled the cabinet and appointed new ministers without consulting Hamas, which was denounced by Hamas. Although Hamas did not recognize the new ministers and rejected the changes, the reshuffling was called "technical and not political", and the new cabinet was presented as a slightly changed existing government, still called "consensus government". In October 2016, Hamas reshuffled its Vice-Ministers of the unity government, without Abbas's consent, thereby creating a de facto new Hamas government in the Gaza Strip.

== Background ==
Pursuant to the Oslo Accords, the authority of the PA Government is limited to some civil rights of the Palestinians in the West Bank Areas A and B and in the Gaza Strip, and to internal security in Area A and in Gaza. Hamas seized Gaza from Abbas's control in 2007 and has been the de facto government in Gaza since.

On 3 May 2011, Fatah and Hamas signed the 2011 Cairo agreement, which promised the formation of a consensus government with the aim to prepare Presidential, Legislative and Palestinian National Council elections to be held in May 2012. Other tasks would be the formation of a "Higher Security Committee", the reconstruction operations in the Gaza Strip (after the 2008/2009 Operation Cast Lead) and the efforts to end the siege and blockade imposed on Gaza, end the split of the governments in West Bank and Gaza, and reactivate the Palestinian Legislative Council.

In the Fatah–Hamas Doha Agreement of 7 February 2012, both parties again agreed to form an interim national consensus government composed of independent technocrats, to prepare for upcoming elections. It would be led by President Mahmoud Abbas. After the implementation of the agreement had been stalled, allegedly because Hamas leaders had refused to allow the registration of new voters in Gaza, a new agreement was signed in May 2012. Eventually, a unity government did not materialize and Abbas established a new PA Government in the West Bank on 6 June 2013, headed by Rami Hamdallah.

On 23 April 2014, Fatah and Hamas concluded the 2014 Fatah–Hamas Gaza Agreement to form a national unity government within five weeks, to be followed by presidential and parliamentary elections to be held on the same day by December.

== Establishment ==
The Unity Government was formed on 2 June 2014 following the agreement between Fatah and Hamas. After the inauguration ceremony, President Mahmoud Abbas said in a televised speech that was broadcast on Palestine TV, that the unity government would serve as an interim government with its main mission to prepare for presidential and parliamentary elections. Prime Minister Rami Hamdallah considered the formation of this government as the first step toward ending the division, uniting the Palestinian homeland and institutions and bringing about national reconciliation. He said that the government's tasks included addressing division, reuniting state institutions, commencing Gaza reconstruction and paving the way for facilitating presidential and parliamentary elections.

The new government was composed of technocrat members. The ministers were nominally independent, but overwhelmingly seen as loyal to President Abbas and his Fatah movement or to smaller leftist factions. None was believed to be affiliated with Hamas.

In March 2016, senior Hamas official Mahmoud Al-Zahar said that Hamas had agreed with a government without Hamas as a coexistence between different programmes rather than "a mix of interests". He said the government's task was to improve electricity and rebuild the Gaza Strip, improve the situation of the Palestinians in Gaza and prepare for elections was the condition for not being part of any government.

Like the former emergency governments after June 2007, which were installed by presidential decree, this unity government was in fact illegal, as it was not approved by the Legislative Council. Without the cooperation of all parties, however, it was not possible to get the necessary quorum to put a vote.

The agreement that led to the formation of the consensus government also calls for reforming the PLO, that ostensibly represents all Palestinians inside and outside the occupied territories. It includes holding elections for the Palestine National Council, the PLO's long-neglected parliament-in-exile, and expanding PLO membership to include Hamas and other political parties.

=== Dispute about the Prisoners' Affairs Ministry ===
Hours before the swearing-in ceremony on 2 June, Hamas threatened not to recognize the unity government if it did not include a Minister for Prisoner Affairs. Abbas wanted to dissolve the Ministry in favour of forming a prisoner affair administration under control of the PLO. In the end, the Prisoners' Affairs Ministry was turned into a commission that would be temporarily run by Shawki al-Issa, the Minister of Agriculture and Social Affairs, upon a decision by the PLO.

In September 2014, the PA declared that the Prisoners Affairs Ministry was replaced with the new established "Higher National Commission for Prisoners and Detainees Affairs", headed by former PA Prisoners Affairs Minister Issa Qaraqe. The Commission came under the responsibility of the PLO. The move was said to have been taken at the request of Israel and Western donor countries, who objected the financial aid the former Ministry provided to Palestinian prisoners of Israel.

After the change, media continued referring to Qaraqe as the "Palestinian minister for prisoner affairs", while Ma'an News Agency in July 2015 used the title "Minister of Prisoners' Affairs" and in 2016 "Head of the Palestinian Committee for Prisoners' Affairs".

In December 2015, Ma'an wrote that the PA had cut the salaries of former Palestinian prisoners. In a response, the Palestinian Prisoners' Society (PPS) said that some of them were no longer paid due to their political affiliations. Others were requested to prove that they actually became sick while in prison. the PPS said they may not recognize the "legitimacy" of the Palestinian Authority.

Upon the formation of the government in 2014, former long-serving deputy Minister for Prisoners' Affairs Ziad Abu Ein became in charge of the portfolio for the struggle against the Israeli West Bank barrier and the settlements, a role equivalent to the rank of a minister in the Palestinian Authority government. Abu Ein died on 10 December 2014, during protest in the West Bank "after inhaling tear gas and being shoved and struck in the chest by a member of the Israeli security forces".

=== International reactions ===
The European Union, the United Nations, the United States, China, India, Russia and Turkey all agreed to work with the new government. The US-based Palestine Center wrote that despite the fact that Hamas was explicitly not involved in the government, US mainstream coverage of the new government focused on Hamas' involvement, echoing Israeli talking points about the government by overstating the alleged role Hamas played in it, in an effort to label it a "terrorist" government.

US Secretary of State John Kerry said that Washington would work with the new Palestinian government while continuing to watch it closely. He expressed "concern about Hamas' role in any such government". The Israeli Government condemned the unity government. It immediately announced a series of punitive measures. They included the withholding of some taxes it collects on the PA's behalf, and freezing negotiations with the Palestinians. It refused to allow the passage of four prospective ministers from the Gaza Strip to the occupied West Bank, while it called on the international community to shun the new Palestinian government. Prime Minister Benjamin Netanyahu ended peace talks with Abbas.

== Timeline ==
Despite the formation of the "unity government", the PA security forces continued arresting Hamas supporters in the West Bank. Hamas in return arrested a senior Fatah official in the Gaza Strip.

Although initially the primary task of the national consensus government was to prepare for legislative and presidential elections to be held after six months, its focus soon shifted to more urgent issues.

=== Kidnapping of Israeli teenagers and Israel–Gaza conflict ===
On 12 June 2014, three Israeli teenager settlers were kidnapped and presumed murdered. Israeli Prime Minister Benjamin Netanyahu accused Hamas of the kidnapping. On 14 June 2014, the Israeli military started major raids on Palestinian areas throughout the West Bank, which continued for some weeks, rounding up hundreds of Palestinian operatives. Militants in the Gaza Strip responded with increased rocket fire at Israel. On 8 July, Israel launched a military operation against Gaza which resulted in over 2,100 Palestinian deaths and wide-scale destruction of civilian property and infrastructure. The government now focused on rebuilding the war-shattered and impoverished enclave.

The Palestinian Unity Government convened on 9 October 2014 for the first time since 2007 in Gaza, to discuss the reconstruction of the Gaza Strip following the 2014 Israel–Gaza conflict. As Hamas was discontented with the government over the failure of the reconstruction process in Gaza, the ongoing closure of the crossings and the failure to settle the issue of the payment of employee salaries, it threatened with a vote of no confidence in Parliament in November 2014.

=== Dispute about expiration ===
On 30 November 2014, Hamas declared that the unity government had ended after the expiration of the six-month period stipulated in the Agreement. Abbas had accused Israel and Hamas of secretly negotiating, and said earlier that Hamas is completely responsible for Gaza, and not the joint Fatah-Hamas unity government. Hamas spokesman Sami Abu Zuhri criticized the PA for the arrest of hundreds of Hamas operatives and detaining 80 Palestinians in the West Bank for political affiliation. Hamas denounced "the escalating violations and criminal acts by the PA security services against supporters of Hamas and the Palestinian resistance". Fatah denied that the unity government mandate had ended. Faisal Abu Shahla said that the reconciliation agreement was still in force, but additional reconciliation talks were suspended until Hamas responded to Fatah regarding a series of bomb attacks against Fatah officials' property in Gaza and the subsequent cancellation of a memorial service for deceased Palestinian leader Yasser Arafat.

=== Resignation and dissolution ===
On 17 June 2015, the Unity Government resigned after President Abbas said it was unable to operate in the Gaza Strip. However, Hamas rejected the dissolution of the government without holding discussions with all parties as a unilateral act. Prime Minister Rami Hamdallah was ordered to form a new government, and various Palestinian factions, including Hamas, are to be consulted before a new government is formed. In response to the July 2015 reshuffle, Hamas said it was not consulted and opposed the process as unilateral, arguing that any unity government should be a non-political entity, carrying out tasks agreed upon by all factions. Hamas said it will retain its control on the Gaza Strip and split from the incoming government if it was not actively included in the process, but preferred a consensus government to govern both the Gaza Strip and West Bank. Hamas also denounced the December 2015 reshuffle as a unilateral act and did not recognise the new ministers.

In the meantime, there had been indirect talks between Hamas and Israel on ways to firm up an informal ceasefire agreement concluded after the 2014 Israel–Gaza conflict, which some commentators have argued prompted Abbas to move to dissolve the unity government.

== Members of the Government ==
June 2014 to June 2015

	Minister	Office	Party
1	Rami Hamdallah	Prime Minister, Interior	Fatah
2	Ziad Abu-Amr	Culture, Deputy Prime Minister	Independent
3	Muhammad Mustafa	National Economy, Deputy Prime Minister	
4	Shukri Bishara	Finance and Planning	
5	Riyad al-Maliki	Foreign Affairs	Independent (Ex. PFLP)
6	Salim al-Saqqa	Justice	
7	Adnan al-Husayni	Jerusalem Affairs	
8	Rula Maaya	Tourism and Antiquities	
9	Jawad Awwad	Health	
10	Khawla al-Shakhsheer	Education and Higher Education	
11	Allam Said Musa	Information and Communication Technology, Transport and Communications	
12	Muhammad Salim al-Hasania	Public Works, Housing	
13	Shawqi al-Ayasa (Shawki al-Issa)	Agriculture, Social Affairs, Prisoners' Affairs *	
14	Haifa al-Agha	Women's Affairs	
15	Maumoon Abdul Hadi Hassan Abu Shahla	Labour	
16	Nayef Abu-Khalaf	Local Government	
17	Youssef Ideiss	Waqf and Religious Affairs	
18	Hussein al-Sheikh	Civil Affairs	Fatah
19	Ziad Abu Ein (until 10 Dec. 2014) **	Head of the department for the struggle against the Israeli West Bank barrier and the settlements (Rank of Minister)	Fatah
20	Ali Mahmoud Abdullah Abu-Diak	Secretary-General of the Cabinet (Rank of Minister)	
* In September 2014, the portfolio of Prisoners' Affairs was transferred to the PLO's "Higher National Commission for Prisoners and Detainees Affairs". Former Prisoners minister Issa Qaraqe became head of the Prisoners and Ex-Prisoner Affairs. ** Killed on 10 December 2014, during a protest in the West Bank.

== Subsequent governments ==
=== July 2015 government ===
On 1 July 2015, President Abbas announced a cabinet reshuffle, with five new ministers appointed. The new ministers were sworn in on 31 July.

- Former Deputy Minister of Local Governance and Governor of Nablus and Hebron Hussein al-Araj became Minister of Local Governance
- Former Minister of Communications and Information Technology Sabri Saydam became Minister of Education
- Former Minister of Public Works, Deputy Minister of Planning and International Cooperation Samih al-Abed became Minister of Transportation
- Former head of the Palestinian Environmental Authority Sufian Sultan became Minister of Agriculture
- Former CEO of Palestine Capital Market Authority Abeer Odeh became Minister of National Economy

Hamas was not consulted about the move and opposed the unilateral forming process, arguing that any unity government should be a non-political entity, carrying out tasks agreed upon by all factions. Hamas said it will retain its control on the Gaza Strip and split from the coming government if it was not actively included in the process, but preferred a consensus government to govern both the Gaza Strip and West Bank.

Although Hamas did not recognize the new ministers and rejected the changes, the reshuffling was called "technical and not political", and the new cabinet was described as a slightly changed existing government, still called "consensus government".

=== December 2015 reshuffle ===
On 14 December 2015, President Abbas announced a minor cabinet reshuffle, with three ministers being replaced.

- Justice Minister Salim al-Saqqa was replaced with Cabinet Secretary Ali Abu-Diak.
- Culture Minister and Deputy Prime Minister Ziad Abu-Amr was replaced with current Government spokesman Ehab Bseiso (Ehab Bsaisso).
- Agriculture and Social Affairs Minister Shawqi al-Ayasa was replaced by Ibrahim al-Shaer.

The new cabinet members were more loyal to Abbas. Palestinian officials accused the President of abusing his powers to settle scores with political rivals in the PLO and his own Fatah faction. Earlier, Abbas had fired Yasser Abed Rabbo as PLO secretary-general on 30 June 2015 and dismissed as head of the Darwish Foundation in December. Abbas also dismissed by presidential decree 25 members of the board of directors of a foundation created to preserve the cultural, literal and intellectual heritage of Mahmoud Darwish and declared the Union of Public Employees illegal in 2014.

Hamas denounced the unilateral step and did not recognise the new ministers. Also former Minister of State and Fatah official Hasan Asfour criticized the decrees, saying that they amounted to a "hijacking of Palestinian legitimacy."

== See also ==
- Palestinian government
