= Doha Agreement =

Doha Agreement may refer to:

- Doha Agreement (2008), agreement between rival Lebanese factions
- Fatah–Hamas Doha Agreement, 2012
- Doha Agreement (2020), agreement between United States and the Taliban
