= Cairo agreement =

Cairo agreement may refer to the following:

- Cairo Agreement (1959) – also known as Maadi Pact or Gentlemen's Agreement, leading to formation of OPEC
- Cairo Agreement (1969) – agreement between Palestinian leader Yassir Arafat and Lebanese General Emile Bustani
- Cairo Agreement (1994) – Agreement on the Gaza Strip and the Jericho Area
- Palestinian Cairo Declaration (2005) – twelve Palestinian factions affirm the status of the PLO as sole representative of the Palestinian people, etc.
- Cairo Agreement (2012) – reconciliation accord between Hamas and Fatah
