= Green Line (Israel) =

Internationally recognized border between Israel and Palestine

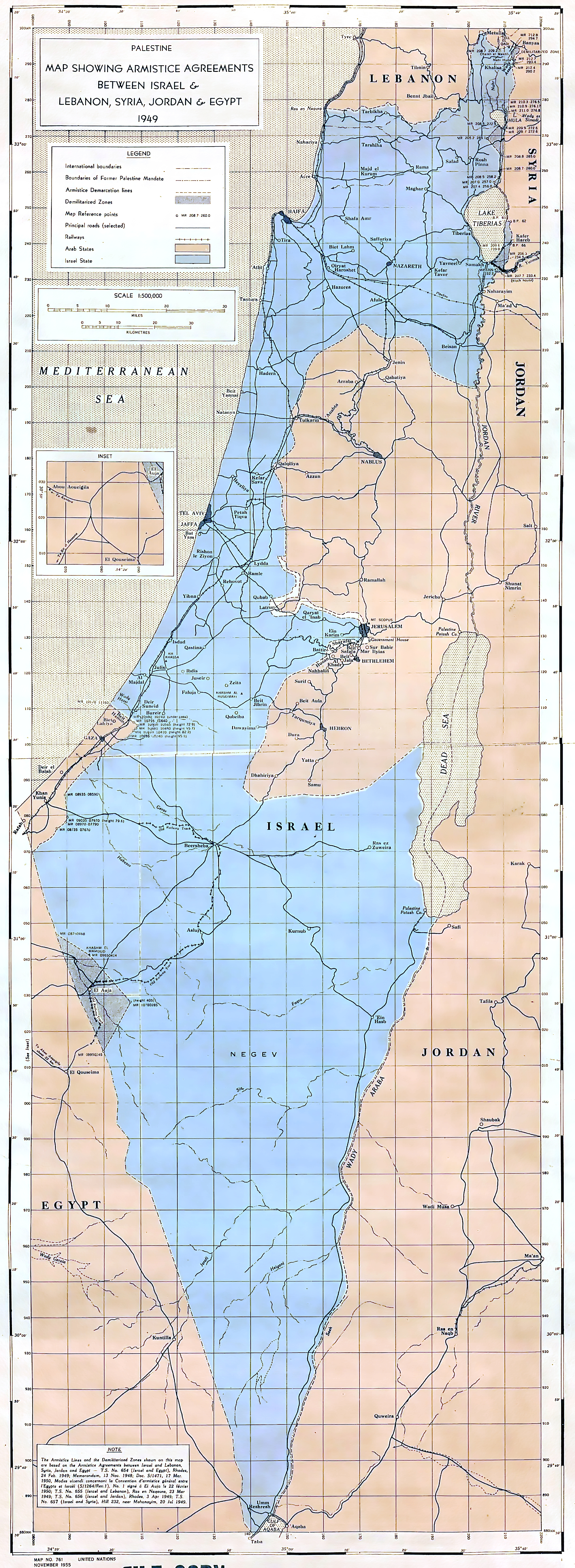
1955 United Nations map showing the Armistice Agreements, with original map reference points ("MR") on the Palestine grid referenced in the respective agreements.

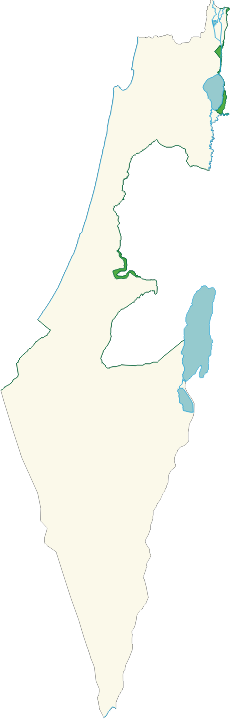
Israel's 1949 Green Line (thin green line) and demilitarized zones (green areas)

The Green Line, or 1949 Armistice border, is the demarcation line set out in the 1949 Armistice Agreements between the armies of Israel and those of its neighbors (Egypt, Jordan, Lebanon, and Syria) after the 1948 Arab–Israeli War. It served as the de facto borders of the State of Israel from 1949 until the Six-Day War in 1967, and continues to represent Israel's internationally recognized borders with the two Palestinian territories: the West Bank and the Gaza Strip. The Gaza Strip borders Egypt while the West Bank borders the country of Jordan.

The Green Line was intended as a demarcation line rather than a permanent border. The 1949 Armistice Agreements were clear (at Arab insistence) that they were not creating permanent borders. The Egyptian–Israeli agreement, for example, stated that "the Armistice Demarcation Line is not to be construed in any sense as a political or territorial boundary, and is delineated without prejudice to rights, claims and positions of either Party to the Armistice as regards ultimate settlement of the Palestine question." Similar provisions are contained in the Armistice Agreements with Jordan and Syria. The Agreement with Lebanon contained no such provisions, and was treated as the international border between Israel and Lebanon, stipulating only that forces would be withdrawn to the Israel–Lebanon border.

The Green Line is often referred to as the "pre-1967 borders" or the "1967 borders" by many international bodies and national leaders, including former United States president Barack Obama, Palestinian president Mahmoud Abbas, the United Nations (UN) in informal texts, and in the text of UN General Assembly resolutions. The name comes from the green ink used to draw the line on the map during armistice talks. After the Six-Day War, the territories captured by Israel beyond the Green Line came to be designated as East Jerusalem, the West Bank, the Gaza Strip, and the Golan Heights. These territories are often referred to as Israeli-occupied territories. The Sinai Peninsula, which was also captured at that time, has since been returned to Egypt as part of the 1979 peace treaty.

== History ==
A border sign in Jerusalem, 1951; in the background: Tower of David

The Green Line refers to the demarcation lines, rather than permanent borders, between Israeli forces and those of its neighbors. All movement across the demarcation lines was banned and monitored by the United Nations Truce Supervision Organization. Most commonly, the term was applied to the boundary between Jordan-controlled Jerusalem and the West Bank and Israel. The drawing of the Green Line superseded entirely the partition lines proposed and voted on by the United Nations in the Partition Plan of 1947 and which Israel had accepted in the Israeli Declaration of Independence. The Palestinian and Arab leaders had repeatedly rejected any permanent partition of Mandatory Palestine.

In 1967, after Israel seized all the territories, other than the Emirate of Transjordan, of the former Mandatory Palestine, as well as other territories, the demarcation lines became militarily irrelevant, and the status of the Green Line became uncertain.

Although Israel has always formally argued that the Green Line has no legal significance, the Green Line continued to have political, legal and administrative significance. Israel regarded the territories beyond the Green Line, unlike those within the Green Line, as occupied territories, and they were not incorporated into Israeli political and civilian administrative systems. The territories beyond the Green Line were administered by the Israeli military or later also by the Palestinian Authority. Citizenship by residence, for example, was determined with reference to the Green Line, as well as a person's refugee status.

The extension of the municipal boundary of Jerusalem in 1980 was an exception to this position. Although Jerusalem was a part of territory beyond the Green Line that was ruled by Jordan until 1967, Israel declared Jerusalem "complete and united" as the capital of Israel according to the 1980 Basic Jerusalem Law. This claim has not been recognised by any country or by the United Nations (UN) Security Council. A notional Green Line continues to divide Jerusalem at the boundary of East Jerusalem.

The Golan Heights are another exception, having been informally incorporated by Israel with the 1981 Golan Heights Law. The UN Security Council declared this to be null and without any international legal effect.

== Impact ==
The sections of the Green Line that delineate the boundaries between Israel, the West Bank and Gaza run through heavily populated regions. The Line corresponds to the military front of the 1948 War, and while the considerations dictating its placement were primarily military, it soon became clear that in many places it divided towns and villages, and separated farmers from their fields. Consequently, the Green Line underwent various slight adjustments, and special arrangements were made for limited movement in certain areas.

Jerusalem was divided in half, into East and West Jerusalem. The village of Barta'a, partially due to errors on the map, was left with one third of its area on the Israeli side and two thirds outside of it.

According to Avi Shlaim, in March 1949 as the Iraqi forces withdrew and handed over their positions to the Jordanian legion, Israel carried out Operation Shin-Tav-Shin which allowed Israel to renegotiate the ceasefire line in the Wadi Ara area of the northern West Bank in a secret agreement that was incorporated into the General Armistice Agreement. The Green Line was redrawn in blue ink on the southern map to give the impression that a movement in the green line had been made.

=== Jewish population ===
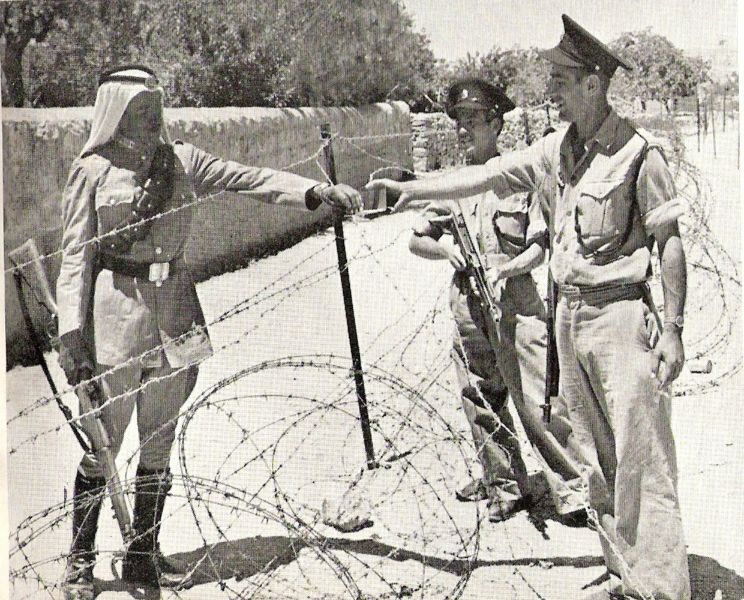
Barbed wire separating East and West Jerusalem at Mandelbaum Gate

During the war in 1947–48, Jews residing east of what subsequently became the Line, including the Jewish Quarter of the Old City, were taken prisoner by the Jordanians. All but a few of the Gush Etzion defenders were massacred. The prisoners were returned to Israel after the war. On July 8, 1948, the Jewish inhabitants of Kfar Darom and Naharayim were evacuated by Israel due to military pressure by Egypt and Jordan. Israel also withdrew from villages in the Lebanese Upper Galilee, whereas Syria withdrew from Mishmar HaYarden.

Since Israel's victory in the Six-Day War, Israel has established settlements south and east of the Line. These have been strongly criticised by other nations.

Many Israelis believe that the settlements are important to Israel's security and also support the settlements ideologically. In contrast, other Israelis believe the settlements are an economic burden and a barrier to peace.

From August to September 2005, Israel implemented a unilateral disengagement plan in which the entire Jewish population of the Gaza Strip was evacuated. In 2006, Ehud Olmert proposed a convergence plan that called for Israel to disengage, unilaterally, if necessary, from much of the West Bank (east of the line).

=== Arab population ===
The majority of Palestinian Arabs on the Israeli side of the Line fled or were expelled during the 1948 Arab-Israeli War (around 720,000). Those who remained became Israeli citizens and now comprise approximately 20 per cent of Israel's total citizenry. The Umm al-Fahm–Baqa al-Gharbiyye–Tira area, known as the "Triangle," was originally designated to fall under Jordanian jurisdiction, but Israel insisted on having it within its side of the Green Line side due to military and strategic reasons. To achieve this, a territorial swap was negotiated, ceding to Jordan the Israeli territory in the southern hills of Hebron in exchange for the Triangle villages in Wadi Ara.

In the Six-Day War, Israel occupied territories beyond the Green Line that were inhabited by over a million Palestinian Arabs, including refugees from the 1947–1949 war. The Green Line remained the administrative border between these territories (with the exception of Jerusalem) and the areas on the Israeli side of the Green Line.

In 1967, Israel annexed East Jerusalem and gave its Arab inhabitants permanent residency status. They were also entitled to apply for Israeli citizenship. Domestically, Israel attempted to emphasize the status of East Jerusalem as part of Israel by its 1980 Jerusalem Law. United Nations Security Council Resolution 478 deemed the law null and void, and this status has not been recognised by any other nation.

In 1981, the Knesset enacted the Golan Heights Law, ostensibly as a reaction to Syrian provocations. This extended the Israeli rule of law to the Golan Heights. (It was also thought to have been motivated by the recent US AWACS sale to Saudi Arabia.) This act was widely considered an informal annexation. It was criticized by the United States as a violation of the Camp David Accords and condemned by the UN Security Council in Resolution 497.

=== Official maps ===
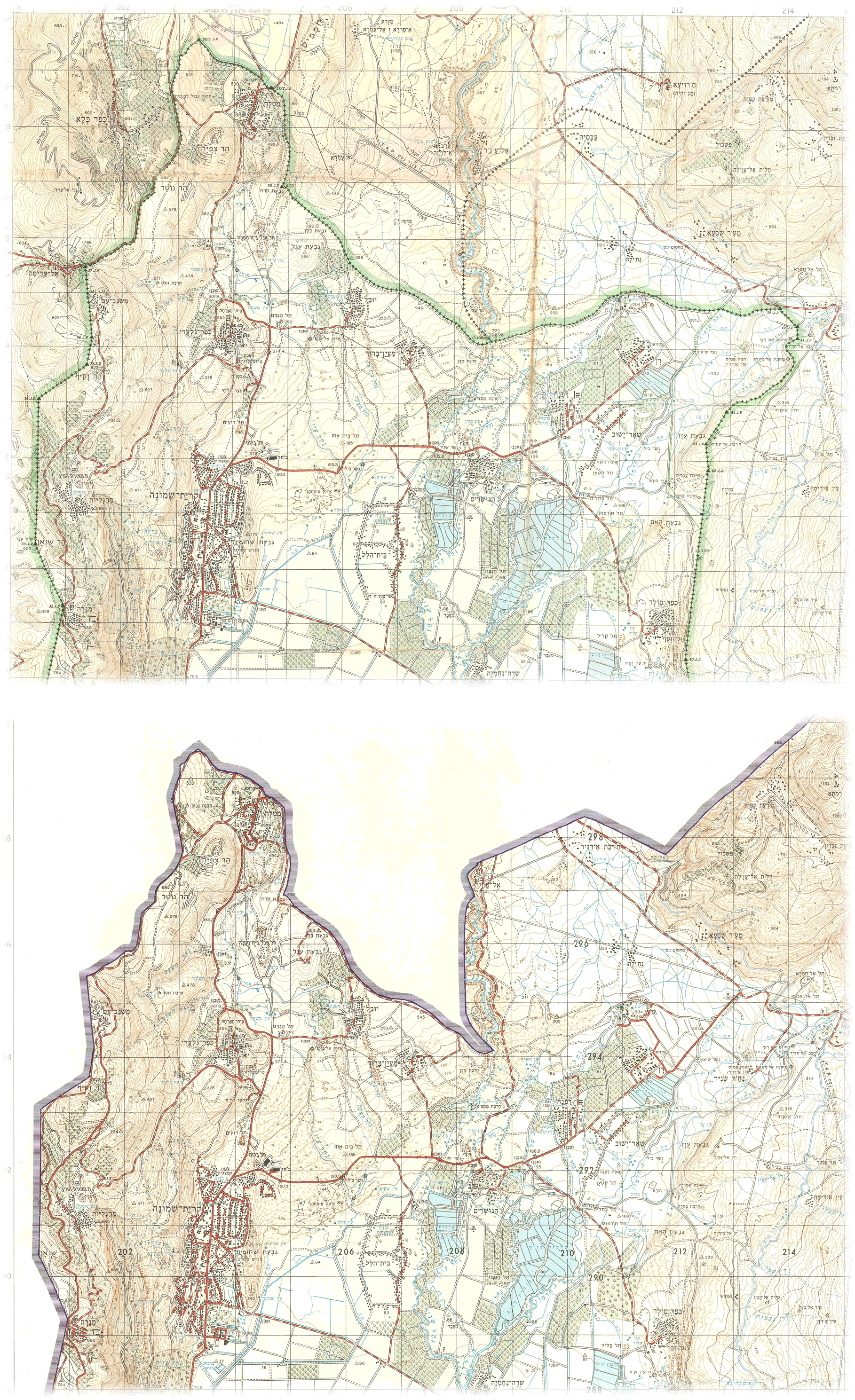
Erasure of the Green Line on official Israel maps after 1967 (Galilee pan-handle example)

In October and November 1967, the Israeli security cabinet passed resolutions to remove the Green Line from official maps. The decision was classified "top secret" and a media blackout was imposed. Printing of the new maps was delayed until a UN General Assembly meeting finished. As a consequence of the decision, the Survey of Israel's official maps began to omit the Green Line and the armistice line with Egypt, while the armistice lines with Jordan and Lebanon were relabeled as ceasefire lines.

In 2022, the Tel Aviv-Yafo Municipality sent maps to its schools that indicated the Green Line contrary to usual practice. The mayor explained the decision as "It's important to us that students know Israel's sovereign borders and the complex reality in areas where Jewish citizens of Israel and Arabs under the Palestinian Authority's control live side by side". However, the Education Ministry told the municipality that the maps must not be used "even as a poster on the wall".

== Israeli–Palestinian conflict ==
In a December 1969 speech, US Secretary of State William P. Rogers said that "any changes in the pre-existing [1949 armistice] lines should not reflect the weight of conquest and should be confined to insubstantial alterations required for mutual security. We do not support expansionism." Harvard law professor Stephen M. Schwebel responded that "...modifications of the 1949 armistice lines among those States within former Palestinian territory are lawful (if not necessarily desirable), whether those modifications are...'insubstantial alterations required for mutual security' or more substantial alterations—such as recognition of Israeli sovereignty over the whole of Jerusalem." In a footnote, he wrote: "It should be added that the armistice agreements of 1949 expressly preserved the territorial claims of all parties and did not purport to establish definitive boundaries between them."

The question of whether, or to what extent, Israel should withdraw its population and forces to its side of the Green Line remains a crucial issue in some discussions surrounding the Israeli–Palestinian conflict. There is a near-unanimous international consensus that Israel should withdraw to its side of the line. This has been expressed in the yearly UN General Assembly vote on the Peaceful Settlement of the Question of Palestine. Although disputed by Israel, United Nations Security Council Resolution 242 (UNSC 242) has declared the interpretation of international law regarding Palestinian Territory.

The Palestinians were not party to the drawing of the Green Line and they rejected UNSC 242, saying that it did not call for an independent Palestinian state, and referred to them as refugees. Since 1976, most elements in the PLO have accepted the pre-June 1967 line as a basis for the establishment of a Palestinian state.

In the early 1980s, American intellectual Noam Chomsky argued that Israeli claims that the Palestinian leadership rejected the international consensus calling for a Palestinian state, with borders along the Green Line, were not consistent with the documented record. In 2008, Al Jazeera and Haaretz both reported that elements in the Palestinian leadership, including Hamas, have called for a two-state settlement based on the pre-June 1967 borders (the Green Line).

While initially seeking a state in all of former Mandatory Palestine, Hamas began acquiescing to 1967 borders in the agreements it signed with Fatah in 2005, 2006 and 2007. In 2017, Hamas released a new charter that supported a Palestinian state within the 1967 borders without recognizing Israel. Hamas's repeated offers of a truce (for a period of 10–100 years) based on the 1967 borders are seen by many as being consistent with a two-state solution, while others state that Hamas retains the long-term objective of establishing one state in former Mandatory Palestine.

The majority of the Israeli public opposes reverting to pre-1967 borders. A 2011 study found that, because of security concerns, 77 per cent of Israelis oppose returning to pre-1967 lines, even if it would lead to peace between Israel and neighboring Arab states.

The Israeli West Bank barrier constructed in the early 21st century is, in parts, kilometres away from the Green Line and most lies within Palestinian territory.

== Physical and social perceptions of the Green Line ==
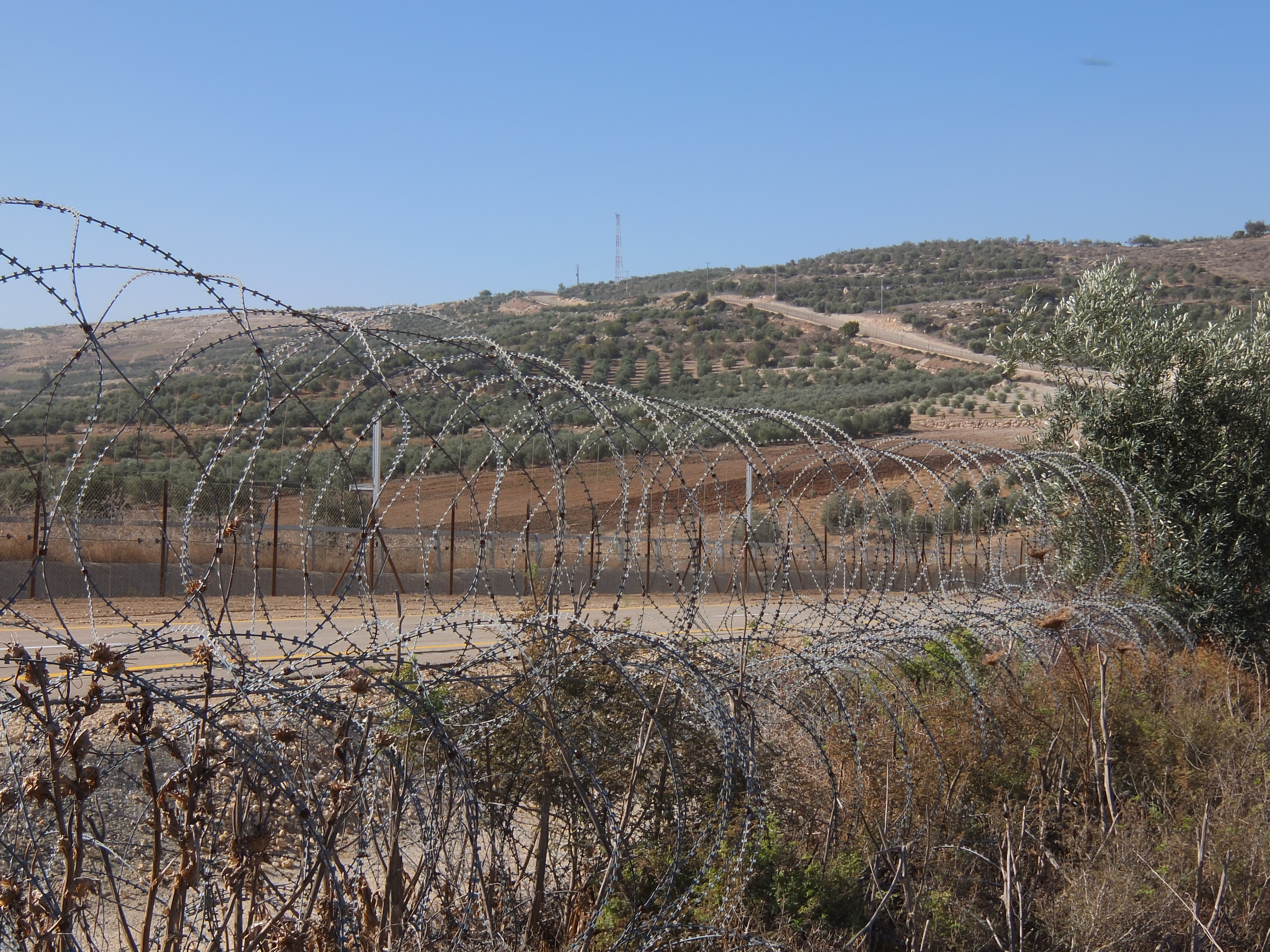
Barbed wire fence separating Palestinian Authority from Israel at the former Israeli-Jordanian Green Line

According to Hebrew University geographer Ilan Salomon, the Green Line can be discerned from space via satellite; it is marked by pine forests planted by the Jewish National Fund to demarcate Israeli territory. Salomon and Larissa Fleishman conducted a 2006 study regarding Israeli students' knowledge of the location of the Green Line, and they found that not much more than one third could identify its placement. They learned that "students who identify with left-leaning parties are more familiar with the location of the West Bank and the Gaza Strip, can sketch them more accurately and are also more aware of the nature of borders."

== Works ==
- At the Green Line

== See also ==
- Purple Line, the ceasefire line between Israel and Syria after the 1967 Six-Day War
- Blue Line (Lebanon)
- Green Line (Lebanon)
- Yellow Line
- Israeli–Palestinian peace process
- Mixed Armistice Commissions
- City Line (Jerusalem), segment of the Green Line that divided the city of Jerusalem from 1948 to 1967
- Seam Zone, areas in the West Bank located east of the Green Line and west of Israel's separation barrier

== Sources ==
- Baconi, Tareq (2018). Hamas contained: The rise and pacification of Palestinian resistance. Stanford University Press. ISBN 978-0804797412.
- Roy, Sara (2013). Hamas and Civil Society in Gaza: Engaging the Islamist Social Sector (2 ed.). Princeton University Press. ISBN 978-0691124483.
- Seurat, Leila (2019). The Foreign Policy of Hamas. Bloomsbury Publishing. ISBN 9781838607449.
- Zartman, Jonathan K. (2020-03-19). Conflict in the Modern Middle East. Santa Barbara, California: ABC-CLIO. ISBN 978-1-4408-6502-2.
