= Fatah–Hamas conflict =

Palestinian factional conflict since 2006

- Part of Palestinian internal political violence
- Map of the Gaza Strip
Date	25 January 2006 – present (main phase in 2007) (20 years, 9 months, 3 weeks and 1 day)
Location	State of Palestine mainly Gaza Strip
Status	Ongoing, reconciliation process: Hamas takeover of the Gaza Strip; New Palestinian government in the West Bank, appointed by Mahmoud Abbas; Mecca Agreement signed in 2007; Reconciliation agreement signed May 2011; Doha and Cairo Agreements signed 2012; Renewed political crisis in March–April 2012; Strong increase of tensions in 2013; Reconciliation deals signed in April 2014; Unity government sworn in during June 2014; Implementation of unity government control in Gaza due date; Israel starts arming Fatah militants in 2025 to weaken Hamas in the Gaza Strip

Belligerents
Hamas; (Palestine) Gaza Strip (after June 2007); (Palestine) Hamas/PJOR-affiliated groups in the West Bank (from 2022)	Fatah; (Palestine) Palestinian Authority; Fatah-affiliated groups in the Gaza Strip (from 2025)

Commanders and leaders
(Palestine) Khaled Mashal (Palestine) Ismail Haniyeh X (Palestine) Yahya Sinwar † (Palestine) Khalil al-Hayya; Mohammed Deif X Mohammed Sinwar X	(Fatah) Mahmoud Abbas (Fatah) Mohammed Dahlan; Hossam al-Astal (Fatah) Rami Hilles

Units involved
Hamas; Al-Qassam Brigades; (Palestine) Hamas/PJOR-affiliated groups in the West Bank (from 2022); Hornets' Nest; Jenin Brigades; Tulkarm Brigade; Nablus Brigade; Nur Shams Brigade; Ramallah Brigade; Tubas Brigade; Qabatiya Brigade; Lions' Den; Jerusalem Brigades; Al-Ayyash Battalion; Biddya Brigades	Fatah; Al-Aqsa Martyrs' Brigades (until 2007) (Note: The Al-Aqsa Martyrs' Brigades was Fatah's armed wing, and while still aligned with Fatah in terms of political ideology, is now a member of the Palestinian Joint Operations Room and allied with Hamas. The AAMB separated from Fatah after Mahmoud Abbas' 2007 decree banning all militias following the Battle of Gaza. Nonetheless, it sometimes still presents itself as the party's armed wing, an association rejected by Fatah leadership.); Fatah-affiliated groups in the Gaza Strip (from 2025); Counter-Terrorism Strike Force; Shuja'iyya Popular Defense Forces; Khanidak clan (denied) (Note: The leader of the Khanidak clan, Yasser Khanidak, has denied collaboration with Israel or the PA, and said he supports Hamas and its allies. He additionally claimed that his activity was only within the framework of revenge for the killing of two of his brothers by another clan.); Al-Mujaida clan (until Oct. 2025); Abu Samra clan

Strength
(Hamas) Al-Qassam Brigades: 20,000–40,000; Executive Police Force (until 2007): 6,000	National Security: 30,000; Palestinian Preventive Security: 30,000; General Intelligence: 5,000; Presidential Guard: 4,200; Al-Aqsa Martyrs' Brigades: 3,500+ (surrendered)

Casualties and losses
83 killed	165 killed
- 98 civilians killed 1,000+ wounded on both sides Total: 350 to over 600 killed

The Fatah–Hamas conflict (Arabic: النزاع بين فتح وحماس, romanized: an-Nizāʿ bayna Fataḥ wa-Ḥamās) is an ongoing political and strategic conflict between Fatah and Hamas, the two main political parties in the Palestinian territories, leading to the Hamas takeover of the Gaza Strip in June 2007. The reconciliation process and unification of Hamas and Fatah administrations remains unfinalized and the situation is deemed a frozen conflict.

The Palestinian Independent Commission for Citizens' Rights has found that over 600 Palestinians were killed in the fighting from January 2006 to May 2007. Dozens more were killed or executed in the following years as part of the conflict.

== Overview ==
Hamas was founded in 1987, soon after the First Intifada broke out, as an offshoot of the Egyptian Muslim Brotherhood. It is a Palestinian Sunni-Islamist fundamentalist organization, which is regarded, either in whole or in part, as a terrorist organization by several countries and international organizations, including by Australia, Canada, the European Union, Israel, Japan, Paraguay, the United Kingdom, and the United States.

In 1996, Hamas called for an intifada against Yasser Arafat. Palestinian Intelligence Chief Amin al-Hindi blamed Hamas for instigating a series of protests in August 1996 in Tulkarm in an effort to subvert the Fatah-led Palestinian Authority, stating that "We have put our hands on messages from abroad instructing people inside the territories to stage riots...."

Tensions between Fatah and Hamas began to rise in 2005 after the death of Yasser Arafat in November 2004. After the legislative election on 25 January 2006, which resulted in a Hamas victory, relations were marked by sporadic factional fighting. This became more intense after the two parties repeatedly failed to reach a deal to share government power, escalating in June 2007 and resulting in Hamas' takeover of Gaza. A major issue was control over the border crossings, especially the Rafah Border Crossing.

Hamas leader Ismail Haniyeh formed a new PA government on 29 March 2006 comprising mostly Hamas members. Fatah and other factions had refused to join, especially as Hamas refused to accept the Quartet's conditions, such as recognition of Israel and earlier agreements. As a result, a substantial part of the international community, especially Israel, the United States and European Union countries, refused to deal with the Hamas government and imposed sanctions. Following the abduction by Hamas militants of Gilad Shalit on 25 June 2006 in a cross-border raid via a tunnel out of Gaza, Israel detained nearly a quarter of PLC members and ministers on the West Bank during August 2006, intensified the boycott of Gaza and took other punitive measures.

Calls for the implementation of the Cairo Declaration, including the formation of a unity government and the cessation of violence between Fatah and Hamas, were made in the Fatah–Hamas Mecca Agreement of 8 February 2007. The Hamas government was replaced on 17 March 2007 by a national unity government headed by Haniyeh comprising Hamas and Fatah ministers. In June 2007, Hamas fighters took control of the Gaza Strip and removed all Fatah officials. President Abbas, on 14 June, declared a state of emergency, dismissed Haniyeh's national unity government and appointed an emergency government, and suspended articles of the Basic Law to circumvent the needed PNC approval.

Hamas has been the de facto governing authority of the Gaza Strip since its takeover in June 2007. Since then, it has fought several wars with Israel, and the Palestinian Authority has been split into two polities, each seeing itself as the true representative of the Palestinian people – the Fatah-ruled Palestinian National Authority and the Hamas Government in Gaza.

== Preceding events ==
=== Involvement of Britain ===
Documents published in the Palestine Papers reveal that in 2004 the British intelligence MI6 helped draw up a security plan for a Fatah-led Palestinian Authority. The plan mentioned as an objective, "encourage and enable the Palestinian Authority (PA) to fully meet its security obligations under Phase 1 of the Roadmap". It proposed a number of ways of "degrading the capabilities of rejectionists", naming Hamas, PIJ (Palestinian Islamic Jihad) and the Al-Aqsa Brigades. The plan was described by the Guardian as a "wide-ranging crackdown on Hamas". The supposed plan for a Fatah counter-insurgency against Hamas backfired in June 2006, when Hamas won the 2006 elections.

=== Israeli disengagement from Gaza ===
In July 2004, there were clashes between rival Hamas-led sections of the security forces in Gaza and violent protests, which were widely seen as a power struggle ahead of Israel's promised pullout from Gaza.

On 16 February 2005, the Israeli parliament had approved its disengagement from Gaza, which would drastically change the Israeli–Palestinian relations in Gaza. The disengagement plan from 2003 was already adopted by the Israeli Government in June 2004. Israel withdrew from Gaza in September 2005. Control of the Gaza–Egypt border was on the Egyptian side handed over to Egypt. The Fatah-dominated PA had been given control on the Gazan side at the Rafah Border Crossing. The 2005 Philadelphi Accord between Israel and Egypt turned over control of the border to Egypt. From February 2005, a technocrat Fatah-led PA government controlled the Palestinian National Security Forces.

From November 2005 until June 2007, the Rafah Crossing was jointly controlled by Egypt and the Palestinian Authority, with the European Union monitoring the activities from 24 November 2005 on the Gazan side.

=== 2006 elections and Hamas-government ===
Tensions between Fatah and Hamas intensified after Hamas won the elections of 2006 and the international community increased the pressure on the Palestinian Authority. As a result of the Hamas led government's refusal to commit to nonviolence, recognition of the state of Israel, and acceptance of previous agreements, Israel, the Middle East Quartet (United States, Russia, United Nations, and European Union) and several Western states imposed sanctions suspending all foreign aid.

The PA government, which had shared authority over the Security Forces with President Abbas, was no longer in the hands of Fatah. After Abbas and Hamas had engaged in a power struggle but failed to reach an agreement, Abbas appointed, on 6 April 2006, the Fatah-affiliated Abu Shbak head of the Security Forces, by-passing the Hamas Interior Minister. In response, Hamas formed its own security force.

On 25 June 2006, militant groups conducted a cross-border raid into Israel. The Israeli response left Hamas with half its parliamentary bloc and its cabinet ministers in the West Bank in Israeli custody.

=== Political deadlock ===
The semi-constitutional and semi-presidential Basic Law gave President and Government a shared political power. Fatah refused to cooperate with Hamas. The powerful Fatah-backed President Abbas was supported by the international community and more or less tolerated by Israel. The Hamas-dominated Palestinian Authority and the parliament on the other hand were boycotted, and international financial aid was rendered via Abbas, bypassing the Palestinian Government. Because Fatah and Hamas did not co-operate, the parliament became dysfunctional and the PA suffered financial distress.

=== Involvement of US, Israel and Arab states ===
Several sources speak of considerable involvement by the United States, Israel and Arab states, after Hamas in 2006 announced the formation of its own security service, the Executive Force, which was denounced by Mahmoud Abbas as unconstitutional. The Presidential Guard of Mahmoud Abbas was enlarged and equipped, and its members trained by the US, Egypt and Jordan. Also, a PLC council member for Hamas, Anwar Zaboun, believes that ″Mohammed Dahlan had a big plan to remove the roots of Hamas, the resistance, in Gaza and the West Bank″.

According to the IISS, the June 2007 escalation was triggered by Hamas' conviction that the PA's Presidential Guard, loyal to Mahmoud Abbas, was being positioned to take control of Gaza. The US had helped build up the Presidential Guard to 3,500 men since August 2006. The US committed $59 million for training and non-lethal equipment for the Presidential Guard, and persuaded Arab allies to fund the purchase of further weapons. Israel, too, allowed light arms to flow to members of the Presidential Guard. Jordan and Egypt hosted at least two battalions for training.

== Rise of tensions ==
=== March to December 2006 ===
Following the elections, Hamas announced the formation of its own security service, the Executive Force, appointing Jamal abu Samhadana, a prominent militant, at its head. Abbas had denounced the move as unconstitutional, saying that only the Palestinian president could command armed forces.

The period from March to December 2006 was marked by tensions when Palestinian Authority commanders affiliated to Fatah refused to take orders from the Hamas-led Palestinian Authority government. Tensions further grew between the two Palestinian factions after they failed to reach a deal to share government power.

=== December 2006 to January 2007 ===
Facing international sanctions, the Hamas-led Palestinian Authority depended on the import of large amounts of cash to pay its debts. On 14 December 2006, Prime Minister Ismail Haniyeh, carrying tens of millions in donations, was denied by Israel entry into Gaza via the Rafah Border Crossing. Angry Hamas militants stormed the post, which was staffed by European monitors and defended by Abbas' Presidential Guard, responsible for security there. After guards had fired at the Hamas militants, they took over the hall, firing shots into the air. A Hamas official tried to get the militants to disperse. Haniyeh had already cut short his trip due to mounting tensions between Hamas and rival faction Fatah, after three sons of a Fatah security chief were killed days earlier.

The same day, Haniyeh was allowed to return to Gaza without the money, but while crossing the border, gunmen attacked his car, killing one bodyguard. One of Haniyeh's sons was moderately wounded and his political adviser Ahmed Youssef was lightly wounded. At the time, Fatah PLC member and former Fatah security chief Mohammed Dahlan was blamed for this apparent assassination attempt. Peace activist Ellen Rosser also believes that it was Dahlan's men who tried to assassinate Haniyeh. Fighting broke out in the West Bank after Palestinian National Security Forces fired on a Hamas rally in Ramallah. Security units loyal to Mahmoud Abbas and dressed in riot gear used clubs and rifles to beat back the demonstrators before the shooting broke out. At least 20 people were wounded in the clashes, which came shortly after the attempt to assassinate Ismail Haniyeh.

On 16 December, Abbas called for new parliamentary and presidential elections, but his advisor Saeb Erekat said that "elections cannot be held before the middle of next year for legal and technical reasons". A senior Hamas lawmaker called it "a real coup against the democratically elected government". Hamas challenged the legality of holding an early election, maintaining its right to hold the full term of its elected offices. Hamas characterized it as an attempted Fatah coup by Abbas, using undemocratic means to overthrow the results of a democratically elected government. Fatah leaders called for the dismissal of the Hamas-led government and the establishment of an emergency cabinet. One Fatah operative said that Abbas had been threatening to call early elections for the past five months and that "more threats are not going to work". The announcement of elections provoked high tensions and gun battles between Hamas and Fatah supporters. Abbas strongly denied allegations that members of Fatah and the Force 17 "Presidential Guard" were behind the assassination attempt on Ismail Haniyeh, and he criticized the kidnapping of Israel Defense Forces (IDF) soldier Gilad Shalit.

On 17 December, pro-Fatah gunmen attacked Hamas' Foreign Minister Mahmoud Zahar. Pro-Hamas militiamen retaliated with shots at the home of President Abbas, wounding five guards. A member of Fatah's Force 17 was killed, together with a passing woman. At the end of the day, Fatah and Hamas agreed on a ceasefire, though gunfire continued outside Mohammed Dahlan's house.

Intense factional fighting continued throughout December 2006 and January 2007 in the Gaza Strip. After a month of fighting, which left 33 people dead, President Mahmoud Abbas attempted to incorporate the Hamas-led Executive Force into the security apparatus loyal to the president. Hamas rejected Abbas' order and instead announced plans to double the size of its force. On 6 January 2007, Abbas outlawed the Executive Force and ordered its disbandment. Fighting continued until a cease-fire was implemented on 30 January. The dueling announcements raised the prospect of an intensified armed standoff. Abbas's only means of enforcing the order appeared to be coercive action by police and security units under his command, which were relatively weak in the Gaza Strip, Hamas's stronghold.

=== February to April 2007 ===
Fierce fighting took place after Hamas killed six people on 1 February in an ambush on a Gaza convoy delivering equipment for Abbas' Palestinian Presidential Guard. According to diplomats, the deliveries were meant to counter smuggling of more powerful weapons into Gaza by Hamas for its fast-growing "Executive Force". According to Hamas, the deliveries were intended to instigate sedition (against Hamas), while withholding money and assistance from the Palestinian people.

On 8 February 2007, the Saudi-brokered Fatah–Hamas Mecca Agreement produced an agreement on a Palestinian national unity government signed by Fatah and Hamas leaders. The agreement included measures to end the internecine violence. The unity government was formed on 17 March. However, it struggled to resolve the two most pressing issues: an economic crisis and a collapse of security in Gaza. Violent incidents continued through March and April 2007; more than 90 people were killed in this period.

=== May 2007 ===
In mid-May 2007, clashes erupted once again in the streets of Gaza. In less than 18 days, more than 50 Palestinians were killed. Leaders of both parties tried to stop the fighting by calling dozens of truces, but none of them held for longer than a few days.

=== June 2007: split of government ===
Throughout 10 and 15 June of fighting Hamas took control of the main north–south road and the coastal road. and removed Fatah officials. The ICRC estimated that at least 118 people were killed and more than 550 wounded during the fighting in the week up to June 15. Human Rights Watch accused both sides with violations of international humanitarian law. Including the targeting and killing of civilians, public executions of political opponents and captives, throwing prisoners off high-rise apartment buildings, fighting in hospitals, and shooting from a jeep marked with "TV" insignias. The International Committee of the Red Cross has denounced attacks in and around two hospitals in the northern part of the Gaza strip. The Israeli government closed all check-points on the borders of Gaza in response to the violence.

On 14 June, Palestinian President Mahmoud Abbas announced the dissolution of the current unity government and the declaration of a state of emergency. Palestinian Prime Minister Ismail Haniyeh was dismissed, and Abbas began to rule Gaza and the West Bank by presidential decree. Hamas spokesman Sami Abu Zuhri responded by declaring that President Abbas's decision was "in practical terms ... worthless," asserting that Haniyeh "remains the head of the government even if it was dissolved by the president".

Nathan Brown of the Carnegie Endowment for International Peace commented that under the 2003 Palestinian Constitution Abbas clearly had the right to declare a state of emergency and dismiss the prime minister but the state of emergency could continue only for 30 days. After that it would need to be approved by the (Hamas-dominated) Legislative Council. Neither Hamas nor Fatah had enough votes to form a new government under the constitution. The Palestinian Centre for Human Rights condemned Hamas' "decision to resolve the conflict militarily" but argued that "steps taken by President Mahmoud Abbas in response to these events violate the Basic Law and undermine the Basic Law in a manner that is no less dangerous."

On 15 June, Abbas appointed Salam Fayyad as prime minister and gave him the task of forming a new government. The international community smoothly recognized the government. Within days, the US recognized Abbas' emergency government and ended a 15-month economic and political boycott of the Palestinian Authority in a bid to bolster President Abbas and the new Fatah-led government. The European Union similarly announced plans to resume direct aid to the Palestinians, while Prime Minister Ehud Olmert of Israel said it would release to Abbas Palestinian tax revenues that Israel had withheld since Hamas took control of the Palestinian Parliament.

== West Bank clashes ==
The attacks of Hamas gunmen against Fatah security forces in the Gaza Strip resulted in a reaction of Fatah gunmen against Hamas institutions in the West Bank. Although Hamas's numbers were greater in the Gaza Strip, Fatah forces were greater in the West Bank.

The West Bank had its first casualty when the bullet-riddled body of a Hamas militant was found in Nablus, sparking the fear that Fatah would use its advantage in the West Bank for retaliation against its members' deaths in the Gaza Strip. On the same day, Hamas also declared that it was in full control of Gaza, a claim denied by Abbas.

On 16 June, a Fatah-linked militant group, the Al-Aqsa Martyr's Brigades, stormed the Hamas-controlled parliament based in Ramallah in the West Bank. This act, including the ransack of the ministry of education, was seen as a reaction to similar looting occurring following Hamas' military success in Gaza.

On 20 June, Hamas leader Mahmoud Zahar declared that if Fatah continued to try to uproot Hamas in the West Bank, it could lead to Fatah's downfall there as well. He would not deny when asked that Hamas resistance against Fatah would take the form of attacks and suicide bombings similar to those that Hamas has used against Israel in the past.

== Post-takeover developments ==
=== October 2007 to January 2008: renewed clashes ===
On 17 October, clashes erupted in eastern Gaza between Hamas security forces and members of the powerful Hilles clan (a Fatah-affiliated clan), leaving up to two dead on both sides. Fatah and Hamas officials gave conflicting accounts of what caused the fighting but the dispute seems to have originated when Hamas officials demanded that the clan return a governmental car. Another gun battle on 20 October killed one member of the clan and a 13-year-old boy.

On 12 November, a large demonstration dedicated to the memory of late Palestinian Authority President Yasser Arafat was organized by Fatah in Gaza City. With over 200,000 participants, this was the largest Fatah demonstration in the Gaza Strip since the Hamas takeover. The demonstration was forcibly dispersed by Hamas gunmen, who fired into the crowd. At least six civilians were killed and over 80 people were injured, some from being trampled in the resulting stampede.

On 1 January 2008, at least eight people died in factional fighting in the Gaza Strip.

=== 2008 Sana'a declaration ===
On 23 March 2008, Hamas and Fatah signed an agreement in Sana'a, Yemen that amounted to a reconciliation deal. It called for a return of the Gaza Strip to the pre-June 2007 situation, though this has not happened. On 8 November 2008, Palestinian reconciliation talks due to be held in Cairo were called off after Hamas announced a boycott in protest at the detention of hundreds of its members by president Mahmoud Abbas's security forces.

=== 2009 political violence ===
The 2009 Hamas political violence took place in the Gaza Strip during and after the 2008–2009 Israel–Gaza conflict. A series of violent acts, ranging from physical assaults, torture, and executions of Palestinians, suspected of collaboration with the IDF as well as members of the Fatah political party, occurred. According to Human Rights Watch, at least 32 people were killed by these attacks: 18 during the conflict and 14 afterward, and several dozen more were maimed, many by shots to the legs.

On 31 May 2009, six people were killed as Palestinian Authority and Hamas forces clashed in Qalqilya. Ethan Bronner described the fighting as an indication "that the Palestinian unity needed for creation of a state is far off."

=== 2010s tensions ===
Following the Egyptian Revolution of 2011 and the deposal of Egyptian president Morsi in July 2013, tensions between Fatah and Hamas reached a new high. According to Barakat al-Farra, the PLO ambassador in Cairo, the Egyptian US-backed el-Sisi regime, which annually receives some $1.5 billion military aid from the US, will keep the Rafah border crossing closed, until forces loyal to Palestinian Authority President Mahmoud Abbas have regained control. A Hamas official accused the PA leadership of playing a major role in enforcing the blockade of the Gaza Strip.

In the midst of negotiations to resolve the 2014 Israel–Gaza conflict, the Shin Bet revealed an alleged plot by Hamas to depose Fatah in the West Bank. This would be achieved by deploying Hamas cells around the West Bank to incite a third intifada and overwhelm Palestinian Authority forces. More than 90 people were arrested. President Abbas said the plot was "a grave threat to the unity of the Palestinian people and its future."

=== 2021 elections failure ===
The 2021 Palestinian legislative election for the Palestinian Legislative Council, originally scheduled for 22 May 2021, according to a decree by President Mahmoud Abbas on 15 January 2021, was indefinitely postponed on 29 April 2021. Announcing the postponement on Palestinian TV, Abbas said "Facing this difficult situation, we decided to postpone the date of holding legislative elections until the participation of Jerusalem and its people is guaranteed." Hamas has rejected the idea of postponing elections and refused to attend the meeting amid speculation that Mahmoud Abbas's Fatah Party will seek to delay or cancel them. Hamas said voting in East Jerusalem does not need Israeli permission. Hamas boycotted the 2021–2022 Palestinian local elections.

== Gaza war ==
In March 2024, Hamas and its allied groups in the Gaza Strip criticized Abbas' appointment of Mohamed Mustafa as the Palestinian Authority's new prime minister following Mohammed Shtayyeh's resignation. They issued a statement referring to the changes as "formal steps that are devoid of substance" and questioned the Palestinian Authority's ability to properly represent the Palestinian people. In response, Fatah condemned Hamas as being itself disconnected from the Palestinian people and accused them of "having caused the return of the Israeli occupation of Gaza" by "undertaking the October 7 adventure".

Later that month, Hamas accused Fatah of sending security officers into northern Gaza in collaboration with Israel, saying it had arrested six individuals and were "in pursuit" of the others. The Palestinian Authority issued a statement denying the claims by Hamas.

In March 2025, Fatah released a statement calling on Hamas to relinquish power in the Gaza Strip. Later in April 2025, Abbas issued his strongest condemnation of Hamas yet during a speech to the Palestinian Central Council in Ramallah. He referred to Hamas as "sons of dogs", stated the group gives Israel "excuses" to continue its attacks on Gaza, and demanded they "release the hostages and be done with it".

By the October 2025 ceasefire between Israel and Hamas, several Fatah-affiliated and reportedly Israeli-backed groups were operating against Hamas in Gaza, namely the Counter-Terrorism Strike Force, the Shuja'iyya Popular Defense Forces, and the Khanidak clan and Al-Mujaida clan.

The Khanidak clan's leader, Yasser Khanidak, has denied affiliation with and support from both the Palestinian Authority and Israel and maintains that the clan's operations are only in the framework of avenging the murder of their clan leader's brothers by another clan. While on 12 October, the Al-Mujaida clan agreed to hand over its unlicensed weapons to Hamas, and affirmed support for them in combating "security chaos". This pledge reportedly came about due to the October 2025 Hamas raid in Khan Yunis, which occurred during Israel's 2025 Khan Yunis offensive, having effectively "decimated" the Al-Mujaida clan into submission. After the October 2025 Gaza ceasefire went into effect, a Telegram channel had posted that the Gaza police's Arrow unit had targeted members of the Fatah-affiliated Abu Samra family/clan in Deir al-Balah and warned other clans and families from providing tribal and familial cover to clansmen who oppose or clash with security forces.

On 4 January 2026, gunmen affiliated with the Shuja'iyya Popular Defense Forces moved into the Sanafour Junction in Al-Tuffah. As the gunmen entered Al-Tuffah, they were met with gunfire from Hamas and allied gunmen. The shootout lasted around 20 minutes and left 2 Hamas militants, before the SPDF retreated into the Israeli-controlled side of the "Yellow Line."

== See also ==
- Black September
- Hamastan
- 2019 Gaza economic protests
- Palestinian political violence
- Israeli incursions in the West Bank during the Gaza war
- Palestinian Authority–West Bank militias conflict, a related inter-Palestinian conflict
