= 2012 Fatah–Hamas Cairo Agreement =

Fatah–Hamas Doha Agreement
إعلان الدوحة
- Signed: April 20, 2012
- Mediators: Egypt
- Parties: Hamas; Fatah

The 2012 Fatah–Hamas Cairo Agreement was a reconciliation accord between the ruling Palestinian National Authority Fatah, and the fundamentalist organization Hamas, which currently rules over the Gaza Strip. Signed in May 2012 by Fatah's President Mahmoud Abbas, and Hamas' leader Khaled Mashal, the objective of the agreement was the formation of an interim government in preparation for the elections for a new Palestinian government. However, the agreement soon fell apart, and steps of major reconciliation were not made until January 2013.

== Background ==
Tensions between political parties Fatah and Hamas have gone on since 2007. Problems between the two parties have been numerous, but namely arguments have risen on how to deal with Israel. Hamas has written off any type of settlement with Israel, believing that it should not have a right to exist in the first place, while Fatah has agreed in the past to work with Israel. On February 8, 2007, Hamas and Fatah signed the Fatah–Hamas Mecca Agreement. In April 2011, they signed an agreement in Cairo, which intended to end the Fatah–Hamas conflict. On February 7, 2012, the parties signed the Doha agreement in the Qatari capital Doha, placing Abbas at the head of an interim government of independent technocrats charged with organizing elections later in 2012. The accord, however, failed on implementation. Other agreements that attempted to bridge peace between the two parties were the 2011 Cairo Agreement, the Fatah-Hamas Mecca Agreement, the 2012 Doha Agreement, and the 2014 Beach Refugee Camp Agreement.

== The Agreement ==
On May 20, 2012, Hamas and Fatah signed another agreement in Cairo, this time to prepare for elections for the new united government of the West Bank and Gaza. The new agreement took steps to carry out the previous Fatah–Hamas Doha Agreement, including the registering of new voters in the Gaza Strip and the formation of an interim government from May 27. Neither party was able to come to a compromise with each other's requests. Fatah's took issue with Hamas over the latter's power in the Gaza Strip, citing that Hamas should give up some of its control. Hamas, on the other hand, would not agree to compromise so long as Fatah continued to appease Israel. The agreement was put on hiatus until May 2012, due to both parties reaching a standstill. The negotiations over the agreement were terminated due to continued disagreements between the parties.

== See also ==
- List of Middle East peace proposals
- 2014 Fatah–Hamas Agreements
- Fatah–Hamas Doha Agreement
- Fatah–Hamas reconciliation process
