= Azzam al-Ahmad =

Palestinian politician (born 1947)

- عزام الأحمد
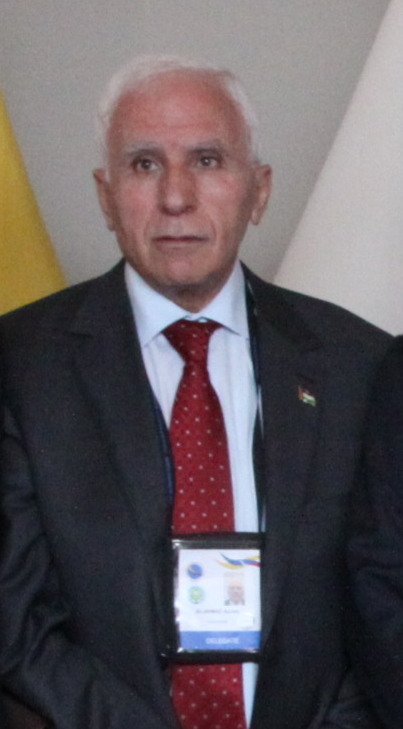
- Al-Ahmad in 2013

Secretary General of the Executive Committee of the Palestine Liberation Organization
- Incumbent
- Assumed office 3 May 2025
- Preceded by: Hussein al-Sheikh

Deputy Prime Minister of the Palestinian National Authority
- In office 17 March 2007 – 14 June 2007
- President: Mahmoud Abbas
- Prime Minister: Ismail Haniyeh
- Preceded by: Nasser al-Shaer
- Succeeded by: Ziad Abu Amr (2013, for political affairs); Mohammad Mustafa (2013, for economic affairs)

Minister of Telecommunications and Information Technology
- In office 12 November 2003 – 24 February 2005
- President: Yasser Arafat; Mahmoud Abbas
- Prime Minister: Ahmed Qurei
- Preceded by: Abdul Rahman Hamad
- Succeeded by: Sabri Saydam
- In office 29 October 2002 – 6 October 2003
- President: Yasser Arafat
- Prime Minister: Mahmoud Abbas
- Preceded by: Mitri Abu Eita
- Succeeded by: Abdul Rahman Hamad

Minister of Public Works and Housing
- In office 9 June 2002 – 29 October 2002
- President: Yasser Arafat
- Preceded by: Abdel Rahman Tawfiq Abdel Hadi Hamad
- Succeeded by: Hamdan Ashou

Member of the Palestinian Legislative Council for Jenin Governorate
- Incumbent
- Assumed office 7 March 1996

Ambassador of the Palestine Liberation Organization to Iraq
- In office 1979–1994
- President: Yasser Arafat
- Preceded by: Abdullah Al-Awad (Chargé d'affaires)

Personal details
- Born: Azzam Najeeb Mustafa Al-Ahmad; 24 November 1947 (age 78) Rummanah, Jenin, Mandatory Palestine
- Party: Fatah
- Education: Baghdad University (BA)
- Occupation: Politician

Azzam al-Ahmad (Arabic: عزام الأحمد; born 24 November 1947) is a Palestinian politician, economist and diplomat. He holds a BA in economics from Baghdad University and has held various significant positions throughout his career. He was the head of the From 1971 to 1974, he served as the head of the General Union of Palestinian Students (GUPS) in Ba'athist Iraq, later becoming the deputy head of the GUPS Executive Committee from 1974 to 1980.

Al-Ahmad was the Palestine Liberation Organization's ambassador to Iraq from 1979 to 1994 and has been a member of Fatah's Revolutionary Council since 1989. He was elected in 1996 and re-elected in 2006 as a member of the Palestinian Legislative Council, representing the Jenin Governorate.

On 13 October 2022 he became one of the Palestinian reconciliation agreement signatories.

== Early life and family ==
Al-Ahmad was born in the village of Rummanah, located in north of Jenin. In 1968, his father, Najeeb al-Ahmad, was deported across the Jordan River by the Israeli Army after its occupation of the West Bank. while in exile in Amman after 1967, Najeeb and his family of nine children found fertile grounds for their cause and political activities. Soon after deportation, Najeeb became a prominent member of the Jordanian parliament.

Azzam al-Ahmad graduated from high school and joined the Syrian universities but later moved to Baghdad with the coming of the Ba'ath party to power in Iraq in 1969 as a staunch supporter of the Palestinian cause.

Political offices
Preceded by Nasser al-Shaer	Deputy Prime Minister of the Palestinian National Authority; 2007	Vacant Title next held by Ziad Abu Amr (2013, for political affairs); Mohammad Mustafa (2013, for economic affairs)
Preceded by Hussein al-Sheikh	Secretary General of the Executive Committee of the Palestine Liberation Organization; 2025–present	Incumbent
