= Palestinian Prisoners' Document =

2006 document by Palestinian prisoners

The Prisoners' Document, officially the National Conciliation Document of the Prisoners was written in May 2006 by Palestinian prisoners, who were being held in an Israeli jail. The five prisoners who took part in writing the Document were respectively affiliated with Fatah, Hamas, Islamic Jihad, the Popular Front for the Liberation of Palestine (PFLP), and the Democratic Front for the Liberation of Palestine (DFLP).

The Document called for Palestinians to have an "independent state, with al-Quds al-Shareef (east Jerusalem) as its capital, on all territories occupied in 1967". Hamas accepted this document, and thus the idea of a Palestinian state on the 1967 borders. The document also upheld the Palestinian right of return, based on the UN Charter and international law, called for a reform of the PLO to enhance its representation through the participation of all forces and factions, and for the election of a new Palestinian National Council before the end of 2006.

President Mahmoud Abbas presented an ultimatum to Hamas to endorse the Document, which some (like the BBC) consider to "implicitly recognize Israel ... or at least [imply] acceptance of Israel if it withdraws to its 1967 borders", such recognition of "Israel's right to exist in peace and security" being one of the key demands of the road map for peace. He threatened to call a national referendum on the Prisoner's Document if Hamas would refuse. Abbas issued the referendum after Hamas had rejected his demands. A revised "National Conciliation Document" was negotiated and signed by all factions in June 2006 without being made essential changes to the text. The referendum did not take place.

Israel denounced the Prisoners' Document, stating that it did not meet the requirements of the Roadmap, most notably that it did not explicitly recognize Israel. Israel also took issue with the document's insistence on the right of return and the right to resist the occupation ″by various means″.

== Background ==
The Prisoners' Document was written by leaders of the most important Palestinian factions imprisoned in Israel. Prisoners of Israel have a high status within the Palestinian society. The Document was written in the context of a looming Palestinian civil war, amidst increasing factional fighting following Hamas' electoral victory and its entry into Parliament and Government.

In the meantime, Israel's recently elected Prime Minister Ehud Olmert was seriously preparing his own "Convergence Plan", which envisioned a withdrawal of the occupation forces from some 90% of the West Bank, while annexing substantial parts including the large and expanded settlement blocs and East Jerusalem, with preservation of Israeli military control over the border zone at the Jordan River.

After all, the civil war the prisoners wanted to prevent broke out a year later in the Fatah–Hamas conflict.

== Power struggle in Gaza ==
Tensions between Fatah and Hamas had been rising since Hamas won the Palestinian elections in January 2006. Both parties mobilized armed militias and frequent violent confrontations took place.

Right after the formation of the Hamas-led PNA Government on 29 March 2006, President Abbas started the building of a third security force under his own control to counter the various Hamas and Fatah militias. Around March/April 2006, Abbas, backed by the US, dispatched a unit of 150 members of his Presidential Guard to take over the control of the Rafah Border Crossing in southern Gaza. End May 2006, he aimed, with the support of US representative General Keith Dayton, to expand the Guard to 10,000 men in order to create an independent security force in Gaza under his full control as a counter to the various militias under Hamas and Fatah control. Also in May, a Fatah security official in the London Sunday Times accused Hamas of plotting to remove Abbas from power and told Palestinian security forces loyal to Palestinian Authority Chairman Mahmoud Abbas were planning an anti-Hamas push. He predicted that "Civil war is inevitable".

In May 2006, indeed civil war-like armed clashes emerged. It was in this period that the Prisoners presented their paper.

== Origin and naming ==
The Prisoners' Document was signed by five leaders of different Palestinian factions, imprisoned at the Hadarim prison, near Tel Aviv in Israel. There are two subsequent versions, the first one signed on 10 May and the revised one on 27 June 2006.

The signatories of the original version were:

- Marwan Barghouthi, Fatah Secretary General and PLC member
- Abdel khaleq al-Natsh (Shaikh Abd-al-Khaliq Natshe), Hamas senior leader
- Abdel raheem Malluh (Abd-al-Rahim Malluh), Popular Front for the Liberation of Palestine (PFLP) Deputy Secretary General and member of the PLO Executive Committee
- Bassam al-Saadi (Shaikh Bassam Saadi), Islamic Jihad (PIJ) leader
- Mustafa Badarneh (Mustafa Badarna), Democratic Front for the Liberation of Palestine (DFLP) leader

As mentioned in the document itself (second paragraph), its describing name is "the National Conciliation Document". The document is usually referred to as "The National Conciliation Document of the Prisoners" or shortly "The Prisoners' Document". The last two names refer to the prisoners who wrote and signed the document.

According to the PLC secretary-general Mahmoud Ramahi, the Document was drafted only in one prison by 20 percent of all the inmates in Israeli jails and did not represent the views of all the Hamas prisoners.

After Abbas had announced a referendum over the Prisoners‘ Document, the prisoner representatives of Hamas and Islamic Jihad retracted their support to protest. The factions then negotiated over the Document and on 27 June 2006, a revised version was signed. The most radical faction, Islamic Jihad, expressed reservations on the clause pertaining to the negotiations.

== The Prisoners' Document ==
The first version of the Prisoners' Document was written when the first Hamas-led PA Government, a government boycotted by Fatah, had been in power for 6 weeks and tensions between Fatah and Hamas were very high under pressure of international sanctions. The Document consists of 18 points. It calls for conciliation between the Palestinian factions, and development and reactivation of the PLO, based on the Cairo Declaration of March 2005. The Cairo Declaration sought reinforcement of the status of the PLO as the sole legitimate representative of the Palestinian people through the participation of all forces and factions to it according to democratic principles. It implied a reform of the PLO, which would mean the inclusion of Hamas and Islamic Jihad.

The Prisoners' Document recalls the struggle to liberate their land.

Point 1 of the first version reads: ″The Palestinian people in the homeland and in the Diaspora seek to liberate their land and to achieve their right in freedom, return and independence and to exercise their right in self-determination, including the right to establish their independent state with al-Quds al-Shareef as its capital on all territories occupied in 1967 and to secure the right of return for Palestinian refugees and to liberate all prisoners and detainees based on the historical right of our people on the land of the fathers and grandfathers and based on the UN Charter and the international law and international legitimacy.″

Point 2 recalls the 2005 Cairo Declaration about reform and reinforcement of the PLO as representative of "the Palestinian people wherever they are located". In order to achieve "development and activation of the PLO", Hamas and Islamic Jihad are explicitly mentioned to join the PLO. Point 2 also calls for a new Palestinian National Council through elections before the end of 2006 to represent "all Palestinian national and Islamic forces, factions and parties and all concentrations of our people everywhere".

Point 3 states "the right of the Palestinian people in resistance and clinging to the option of resistance with the various means and focusing the resistance in the occupied territories of 1967 along with the political action and negotiations and diplomatic action and continuation of popular and mass resistance against the occupation in its various forms and policies...".

Point 5 declares the Palestinian Authority ″the nucleus of the future state″ and stresses on respecting the laws and the responsibilities and authorities of the president and the government.

Point 6 calls for "a national unity government on a basis that secures the participation of all parliament blocs, especially Fatah and Hamas ...".

Point 7 recognizes negotiations adhering to national goals as mentioned in the document, and falling within the jurisdiction of the PLO and the President of the Palestinian Authority. Any agreement needs ratification by the newly elected National Council, or subjected to a general referendum to be held in the homeland and the Diaspora.

Point 8 calls the liberation of the prisoners and detainees a sacred national duty.

Point 9 demands the implementation of UN Resolution 194.

Point 16 calls for a restructure of the security system, and organize its tasks towards both defending the homeland and confronting the aggression and the occupation and to maintain law and order within the Palestinian society. Weapons that harm the resistance and distort its image should be confiscated.

== Abbas' call for a referendum ==
On 11 May 2006, the Prisoners' Document was presented to the executive committee of the PLO. President Mahmoud Abbas immediately endorsed the document.

On 25 May, the Document was discussed at a ″Palestinian National Dialogue Conference″, which was held by live video between Ramallah and the parliament building in Gaza City, because Hamas representatives based in Gaza were prohibited by Israel from traveling to the West Bank. At the Conference, Palestinian Authority President Mahmoud Abbas, who had committed himself to the Road map for peace, tried to press Hamas to endorse within 10 days the Prisoners' Document with its implicit recognition of Israel by calling for the establishment of a Palestinian state within the 1967 borders with al-Quds al-Shareef (East Jerusalem) as its capital. Otherwise, Abbas would in 40 days call a national referendum on the Prisoners' Document.

Israeli Prime Minister Ehud Olmert, at the same time, proceeded with the promotion of his "convergence plan", which he had presented before the Knesset on 4 May 2006. The plan envisioned a partial unilateral Israeli withdrawal from the West Bank and annexation of the large settlement blocs.

On 27 May, Hamas rejected the ultimatum and announced that it opposed the full adoption of the document and instead wanted a dialog with Fatah about the document. The Popular Front for the Liberation of Palestine (PFLP) chief Ahmed Jibril said that, should the referendum be held, Palestinians in exile should be allowed to vote.

On 5 June, Abbas declared that efforts to get support for the Prisoners' Document by the Hamas government had failed. He set a last ultimatum until midnight to accept the Document as it is, before calling a national referendum on the issue. Hamas said the group was ready to continue negotiations, but rejected the deadline set by Abbas. A prominent leader of the Islamic Jihad, said that the referendum “confiscates the right of the coming generation to fighter for the liberation of the historic Palestine, occupied in 1948”. According to a BBC journalist, Abbas was seeking to use the Prisoners' plan to strengthen his hand in his power struggle with the Hamas-led government and wanted to turn the referendum into a vote of confidence in himself – and a vote of no-confidence in Hamas.

On 6 June, the PLO Executive Committee endorsed the Document and the referendum. The deadline for Hamas to agree was extended until the weekend. A poll in June showed that 77% of Palestinians supported the Prisoners' Document and 83% supported the creation of a Palestinian state within the 1967 borders as stipulated in the Document. Co-author of the Document Marwan Barghouti said that it was intended to be a basis for discussion, not a final status document that would divide Palestinians. He was furious at Abbas for "hijacking" his paper.

Hamas lawmakers challenged the legality of Abbas' referendum decree. Also Hamas officials in Syria were against the referendum. On 8 June, Hamas and Islamic Jihad formally rejected the idea of a referendum, while the PFLP expressed reservations. As Hamas also persisted in its refusal to endorse the Document in its present form, Abbas on 10 June issued a Presidential decree which called for a referendum on 26 July, to be held in the occupied Palestinian territories. The referendum put only one question: "Do you agree to the national conciliation document "Prisoners Document"?" The answer had to be either Yes or No.

Hamas demanded changes in the language of the proposal, and Hamas officials called it an attempt to downfall the Hamas-led PA government and called on Palestinians to boycott the vote. The status of the Prisoners' Document decreased considerably as the prisoners of Hamas and Islamic Jihad who had signed the Document withdrew their name from it in support of the protest against the referendum and declared themselves no longer a party to the document. Abbas declared that he would rescind his decree if negotiations with Hamas were successfully concluded before the referendum date.

Had Hamas at this point chosen to endorse the Document, and were it to become the government’s platform, then Abbas would have had a hard job to sell it to Israel in negotiations and be forced to adopt positions with which he disagreed. Moreover, it would have been transformed from a potential bridge between Fatah and Hamas into another instrument in their power struggle. Hamas, however, chose to focus on the legality of the referendum and ignored the content, avoiding internal discussions.

Also Israel objected to the plan, because it endorsed the right of return of Palestinian refugees and because it endorsed the Palestinian right to resist the occupation in areas occupied in the 1967 Six-day war. Israeli Prime Minister, Ehud Olmert, said that the referendum is “meaningless” because the vote cannot be a basis for negotiation. In Egypt, Jordan and Europe, instead, Olmert promoted his plan for an Israeli unilateral withdrawal from the West Bank.

== Second version: "National Conciliation Document" ==
This 'second version' has been endorsed by Hamas, whereas the original version (see above, The Prisoners' Document) has not.

Following Abbas' call for a referendum, the parties started negotiations on the text of the Document. By mid-June 2006, two Hamas MPs said that 98 percent of the disagreements over the plan had been ironed out. Fatah and Hamas representatives declared that an agreement on 15 out of the 18 points in the Document had been reached. There remained differences, however, on the issues of the exclusive status of the PLO in negotiations with Israel, the right of the Palestinian people for armed resistance within the borders of the occupied territories, and the question of holding a referendum on future agreements with Israel. Meanwhile, frequent armed clashes between Fatah and Hamas took place in the streets of Gaza.

On 28 June, the re-negotiated version was signed by Fatah, Hamas, Islamic Jihad Movement, PFLP, and DFLP, whereby Islamic Jihad expressed reservations on the clause pertaining to the negotiations.

The revised version contained, besides some stylistic, also some more important changes.

- Point 1 now explicitly speaks of "…seek and struggle [version one said only: "seek"] to liberate their land", then inserts these extra phrases: "remove the settlements and evacuate the settlers and remove apartheid and annexation and separation wall, and to achieve…", and then continues with the previous text of version 1 about "establish their independent state" etc.
- In point 2, Hamas and Islamic Jihad Movements are no longer explicitly mentioned as parties to join the PLO. Instead, the PLO should achieve ″the participation of all forces and factions to it according to democratic principles that reinforce the status of the PLO as the sole legitimate representative of the Palestinian people wherever they are in a manner that meets with the changes on the Palestinian arena and in a manner that consolidates the authority of the PLO to assume its responsibilities in leading our people in the homeland and the Diaspora.″ Furthermore, it proposes ″elections, where possible, according to proportional representation, and through agreement where it is not possible to hold elections″.
- Point 5 adds: ″and stress on the importance and need for creative cooperation between the presidency and the government″.
- Point 6 no longer calls for ″a national unity government on a basis that secures the participation of all parliament blocs, especially Fatah and Hamas and the political forces that desire to participate on the basis of this document″, but instead, for ″a national unity government that secures the participation of parliamentary blocs and political forces interested in participating on the basis of this document″.
- Point 7 (just like in version 1 : "Administration of the negotiations falls within the jurisdiction of the PLO and the President of the PNA...", and then further:) states that referendums about negotiations agreements, if held, explicitly involve the Diaspora.
- Point 11 seeks to enhance democracy by adding: ″and to stress on the principle of separation of authorities″.

== Consequences ==
With the signing of the Prisoners' Document, the political leadership of all factions in the Palestinian territories, including Hamas and Islamic Jihad, had implicitly recognized Israel and explicitly accepted a Palestinian state within the pre-1967 boundaries, based on the UN Charter and international law, and Hamas agreed with peace negotiations and diplomacy conducted by the PLO, provided that Hamas was admitted into the organisation (as the document was put forth as a complete package: "the participation of all forces and factions").

Hamas refused, however, to explicitly recognize Israel and forswear armed resistance within the occupied territories. This lead Israel to denounce the document, calling it a ″stepping away from peace″. On 29 June 2006, the Israeli Ministry of Foreign Affairs wrote on its website:

″The objective behind this document had nothing to do with advancing prospects for peace with Israel ... The document fails to meet the requirements of the Roadmap and the three basic conditions of the Quartet: recognition of Israel's right to exist, ending terrorism, and adherence to all existing agreements between Israel and the Palestinian Authority ... Explicitly supporting the establishment of a Palestinian state within all the territories "occupied since 1967" does not mean recognition of Israel.″

Most Palestinians supported the Document.

== Olmert's "convergence plan" ==
While the Palestinians were discussing the Prisoners' Document, Israeli Prime Minister Ehud Olmert pushed his so-called "convergence plan" or realignment plan, a plan for partial Israeli withdrawal from the West Bank. Israel would solidify its control of large settlement blocs and unilaterally draw its border with the Palestinians, if there was no breakthrough in peace efforts were to come.

On 4 May 2006, Olmert had already presented the plan before the Knesset after being approved by the Israeli Government. A "convergence committee" had been installed to prepare a detailed draft plan. The plan drew staunch opposition worldwide and when the Prisoners' Document was published and discussed, Olmert said that he would be "willing to devote 6 to 9 months to find a Palestinian partner" before turning to his unilateral plan. At the same time, however, he approved expansions of settlement boundaries for the first time in years. He also said that not all "scattered settlements" would be dismantled and relocated.

On 23 June 2006 US President George W. Bush hailed Olmert's plans, although he said that a negotiated agreement "best serves Israelis and Palestinians and the cause of peace."

== Gaza-Israel conflict ==
The implications of the document were overshadowed by the abduction of the Israeli soldier Gilad Shalit on June 25, during the 2006 Gaza cross-border raid in which Hamas militants entered Israel through hidden tunnels. In response, Israel threatened to invade Gaza unless Gilad was returned. Under international pressure, President Abbas assured Israeli intelligence that efforts were underway to secure the release of Gilad.

On 28 June, Israel began Operation Summer Rains, an invasion of Gaza with the stated goals to rescue Gilad and to end rocket fire into Israel. International attention was led away from the Prisoners' Document and focused on the invasion, which lasted until the end of November.

== Aftermath ==
Hamas had hoped the document would afford international recognition of the PA government. However, the international community continued its boycott of the elected PA government and maintained its sanctions against the Palestinians.

The referendum issued by Abbas was never held. After the signing of the revised Prisoners’ Document, instead, Fatah and Hamas started negotiations on a unity government. On 11 September 2006, President Mahmoud Abbas and Prime Minister Ismail Haniyeh reached a tentative agreement to form a government of national unity. They agreed that the new government should be based on the Prisoners’ Document. The PFLP expressed its willingness to participate in the coalition government. On 20 September, the Palestinian daily al-Ayyam published the text of the agreement, called ″Program for a new government″, consisting of 7 points. The accord states that the government will ″respect″ the agreements signed by the PLO, and support plans based on the 2002 Arab Peace Initiative. While the Arab Peace Initiative stipulates the recognition of Israel in exchange for inter alia a complete withdrawal from the occupied territories, including East Jerusalem, an explicit recognition is absent in the Abbas-Haniyeh Accord itself. The latter reiterates the mainpoints of the Prisoners’ Document, and for the first time, Hamas recognizes the peace agreements between the PLO and Israel.

The Abbas-Haniyeh draft agreement met with objections from some Hamas leaders over the mentioning of the Arab Peace Initiative, which they saw as tantamount to recognition of Israel. They insisted on replacing the Peace Initiative with the term ″Arab legitimacy″. The opposition escalated when Abbas in a speech before the UN General Assembly on 21 September claimed that the program for a new government was strictly in line with the Quartet conditions (commitment to the principles of nonviolence, recognition of Israel, and acceptance of previous agreements and obligations, including the Roadmap). The next day, Haniyeh declared that he would not head a government that recognizes Israel, but he reiterated Hamas' readiness to establish a Palestinian state in the occupied territories and to honor a long-term truce with Israel. On 23 September, Abbas declared the unity effort ″back to zero″ and both parties blamed each other for not respecting the agreement.

On 9 October 2006, Ismail Haniyeh reconfirmed his rejection of the Arab Peace Initiative, because it includes recognition of Israel. Apart from that, Israel itself had outrightly rejected the plan in 2002. Haniyeh also complained that President Abbas did not invite Hamas' cabinet ministers to high-ranking meetings in Ramallah.

Amidst inter-factional violence, Abbas issued on 16 December 2006 a call for early parliamentary and presidential elections. Saeb Erekat, however, said the Palestinian Basic Law, which acts as a constitution, has no provision for calling early elections. Hamas was displeased and accused Abbas of launching a coup.

While the Fatah–Hamas fightings continued, the negotiations on a unity government stagnated until on 8 February 2007, the Saudi-brokered Fatah–Hamas Mecca Agreement paved the way to the short-lived Palestinian National Unity Government of March 2007. The Mecca Agreement called for the end of Palestinian bloodshed, a Palestinian national unity government, activation and reform of the PLO, and respecting the effective laws of the PA. The unity government was again led by Ismail Haniyeh, but yet supported by Fatah. However, it still failed to get the support of Israel as well as the international community.

Attempts to form a single security force resulted in a struggle for power between Abbas and the Palestinian Authority. Fighting between militants and forces of Fatah and Hamas escalated. Eventually, Hamas violently took over Fatah-controlled security headquarters and sites in the Gaza Strip on 14 June 2007. The fighting was accompanied by killings, extrajudicial executions, kidnappings and torture. The same day, President Abbas declared a state of emergency, dissolved the March unity government, and installed an emergency government, leaving Abbas with lost control over Gaza. In return, a large-scale crackdown on Hamas took place in the West Bank, with many Hamas supporters detained.

The PLO, which, after Hamas had won the elections had become the primary political platform for President Abbas, was not reformed, with Hamas remaining excluded. Fatah, the dominant party within the PLO, was internally deeply divided.

== See also ==
- Arab–Israeli conflict
- History of the State of Palestine
- Palestine Liberation Organization
- Fatah–Hamas conflict
