= Fatah–Hamas reconciliation process =

Political initiative in Palestine

A series of attempts to resolve the hostility between Fatah and Hamas have been made since their 2006–2007 conflict and the subsequent violent conflict over the Gaza Strip.

Despite a number of agreements, those attempts have not yet been successful, with Hamas still exercising full control of the Gaza Strip, despite the formation of the "unity government" in June 2014.

== Background ==
Until the First Intifada, Fatah was the sole dominating party in the Palestinian political arena, including the PLO. In 1987, Hamas arose as a resistance movement against the Israeli occupation. Following the Oslo Accords, the PLO, of which Fatah still was the dominant member, formally denounced armed resistance and recognized Israel. Hamas refused to recognize Israel and opposed the Oslo Accords and subsequent agreements between the PLO and Israel. Under pressure of Israel and the international community, Fatah attempted to eliminate Hamas, especially after Mahmoud Abbas had succeeded Arafat as President of the Palestinian National Authority. Tensions mounted ahead the Israeli disengagement from Gaza in 2005 and culminated in the Battle of Gaza in June 2007, resulting in a split of the Palestinian government.

In reconciliation attempts, Hamas has mainly focussed on reform of the PLO and its inclusion in the organisation. After Hamas' victory in the 2006 elections, it unsuccessfully tried to run the PA Government due to Israeli and international boycott.

Although Hamas has maintained that it is ready to conclude a long-term truce with Israel (Hudna), it has vowed to never recognize Israel, because this would imply the recognition of the "Zionist occupation of Palestine", which Hamas views as an Arab Islamic country. In the view of Hamas, recognition of Israel would imply the acceptance of the expulsion of more than 700,000 Palestinians during the Nakba during the 1948 Arab–Israeli war. Hamas' refusal to recognize Israel and denounce armed resistance, unlike the PLO and implicitly Fatah, has been the main reason for Israel and the international community to oppose the reconciliation between Fatah and Hamas. Fatah has met with massive external pressure not to cooperate with Hamas.

== Israeli obstruction attempts ==
Israel has consistently objected to Hamas being included in any PA government. In 2009, for example, Benjamin Netanyahu said that Israel would never make peace with Hamas and "cannot accept Hamas as a negotiating partner". Following the April 2011 Cairo Agreement, he ruled out a peace agreement for that reason. He said: "The PA must choose either peace with Israel or peace with Hamas. There is no possibility for peace with both" and "How can you talk to us about peace when you're talking about peace with Hamas. You can choose [to make] peace with Israel or you can choose peace with Hamas".

President Abbas has consistently been under pressure not to make any deal with Hamas. In September 2013, Abbas admitted that he was under pressure from the US and Israel not to achieve unity with Hamas. PLC council member for Hamas "Anwar Zaboun" said that both the US and EU maintain a veto on the reconciliation.

In 2011, an Israeli official declared that Israel would cut its ties with the PA if it brought Hamas into its government. In reaction to the February 2012 Doha Agreement and the announcement of a unity caretaker government composed of non-affiliated technocrats (thus without Hamas members), Netanyahu reiterated that Abbas must choose between peace with Israel and peace with Hamas, but that he had chosen "to abandon the path of peace and join with Hamas". When Abbas ten days later openly declared that the next government would remain committed to all signed obligations and agreements, rather than silently let run a non-political technocrats government, Hamas was angered and the unity government did not emerge.

When eventually a national unity government was formed in 2014, without any Hamas ministers, Israel nevertheless condemned the unity government, imposed sanctions on the new PA government and ended peace talks with Abbas.

One of the effective means of pressure at times used by Israel is withholding of taxes it collects on behalf of the PA. Israel collectively punished the Palestinians, for example, following the formation of the 2006 PA government and the successive 2007 unity government, following the May 2011 reconciliation agreement and after UN applications.

Israel and the United States have effectively opposed reconciliation, according to Jimmy Carter.

== 2005 Cairo Declaration ==
On 19 March 2005, twelve Palestinian factions, including Fatah, Hamas, Islamic Jihad, Popular Front for the Liberation of Palestine (PFLP) and Democratic Front for the Liberation of Palestine (DFLP) signed the Palestinian Cairo Declaration. The Declaration reaffirmed the status of the Palestine Liberation Organization (PLO) as the sole legitimate representative of the Palestinian people through the participation in it of all forces and factions according to democratic principles. The Declaration implied a reform of the PLO by the inclusion in the PLO of Hamas and Islamic Jihad. It also called for unity of the Palestinian factions against the Israeli occupation and avoidance of further violent interactions between the Palestinian groups.

== 2006 Prisoners' Document ==
In May 2006, leaders of 5 Palestinian factions in an Israeli prison, including from Fatah and Hamas, signed a National Conciliation Document, known as the Prisoners' Document. It was written with the intention to reconcile all factions and unite them in their struggle against the Israeli occupation and form a government of national unity. It envisioned an independent Palestinian state within the 1967 borders with East Jerusalem as its capital. President Abbas immediately endorsed the Document, which implicitly recognizes Israel. He demanded, however, that Hamas explicitly approve it, threatening with a national referendum on the Document. Eventually, the political leadership of all factions endorsed a revised version of the Prisoners' Document. Hamas refused, however, to explicitly recognize Israel and to forswear armed resistance within the occupied territories. Israel quickly dismissed the Document because it did not explicitly recognize Israel.

On 11 September 2006, President Mahmoud Abbas and Prime Minister Ismail Haniyeh reached a tentative agreement to form a government of national unity. They agreed that the new government should be based on the Prisoners' Document. On 20 September, the Palestinian daily al-Ayyam published the text of the draft-agreement, called "Program for a new government", consisting of 7 points. The accord states that the government will "respect" the agreements signed by the PLO, and support plans based on the 2002 Arab Peace Initiative. In the Abbas–Haniyeh draft agreement, Hamas for the first time recognizes the peace agreements between the PLO and Israel.

When Abbas in a speech before the UN General Assembly on 21 September claimed that the program for a new government was strictly in line with the Quartet conditions (commitment to the principles of nonviolence, recognition of Israel, and acceptance of previous agreements and obligations, including the Roadmap), he drew, however, strong opposition from more radical members of Hamas. The next day, Haniyeh declared that he would not head a government that recognizes Israel, but he reiterated Hamas' readiness to establish a Palestinian state in the occupied territories and to honor a long-term truce with Israel. On 23 September, Abbas declared the unity effort "back to zero" and both parties blamed each other for not respecting the agreement. On 16 December 2006, Abbas unilaterally issued a call for early parliamentary and presidential elections, displeasing Hamas.

== February 2007 Mecca Agreement ==
On 8 February 2007, Fatah and Hamas sign the Fatah–Hamas Mecca Agreement, agreeing to stop the military clashes in the Gaza Strip and the formation of a national unity government.

== March 2008 Sana'a Declaration ==
On 23 March 2008, Hamas and Fatah sign the Sana'a Declaration that called for a return of the Gaza Strip to the pre-June 2007 situation. Disagreement about the interpretation immediately appeared. Fatah said that Hamas should relinquish its hold on Gaza first, while Hamas demanded the reinstatement of the Hamas-led unity government.

On 8 November 2008, reconciliation talks due to be held in Cairo called off after Hamas announced a boycott in protest at the detention of hundreds of its members by President Abbas's security forces.

== 2009–2010 talks ==
=== 2009 talks ===
At the end of February 2009, Hamas and Fatah start talks in Cairo after the Israeli assault on Gaza in Operation Cast Lead that began on 27 December 2008 and ended on 18 January 2009.

On 7 March 2009, Salam Fayyad submits his resignation as prime minister to pave the way for the formation of a national unity government.

On 12 March 2009, the parties reportedly reach a compromise on the issue of the Palestinian Security Services, and on 15 March on holding presidential and legislative elections by 25 January 2010.

On 17 March, problems appear on the terms of a national unity government. Fatah clings to adherence to the Quartet conditions, including recognition of Israel and focus on negotiations with Israel, while Hamas wants a majority in a new government and refuses to recognize Israel. The talks stalled in October due to "inappropriate conditions."

=== 2010 talks ===
In February 2010, the parties, among other Palestinian groups, held talks aimed at reconciling rival factions. In March, representatives from Fatah and Hamas meet in Damascus.

On the Doha Debates television show, representatives of Fatah and Hamas discussed the future of the Palestinian leadership.

After six rounds of reconciliation talks that resulted in failure, in early September 2010, Cairo did put forward a new document. The document envisioned general elections to be held in the Gaza Strip and the West Bank in the first half of 2010, a reform of Palestinian security services under the Egyptian supervision and the release of political prisoners by both factions. In November, Hamas and Fatah met in Damascus.

== May 2011 Cairo Agreement ==
On 27 April 2011, representatives of the two factions announced an agreement, mediated by Egypt, to form a joint caretaker government, with presidential and legislative elections to be held in 2012.

On 4 May 2011, at a ceremony in Cairo the agreement was formally signed by the Palestinian Authority President Mahmoud Abbas and Hamas leader Khaled Mashal. The accord provided for the formation of a "transitional" government of technocrats to prepare for legislative and presidential elections in one year. It also permitted the entry of Hamas into the Palestine Liberation Organization and holding elections to its Palestine National Council decision-making body. The Palestinian Authority was to continue to handle security in the West Bank, and Hamas in Gaza Strip. They were aimed to form a joint security committee to decide on future security arrangements.

Israeli Prime Minister Binyamin Netanyahu called the accord "a mortal blow to peace and a big prize for terror." Israel responded to the reconciliation with a punitive withholding of PA taxes. The United States said that it would judge the new Palestinian government by its policies and that it would have to recognize Israel, accept previous agreements with it and renounce violence. Khaled Mashal said that Hamas was prepared to work with Fatah to guide both Palestinian diplomacy and "resistance in all its forms" and that Hamas shared the goal of establishing "a Palestinian state, independent and completely sovereign, on the lands of the West Bank and Gaza Strip, with its capital, Jerusalem, without a single settler, without conceding a single inch and without conceding the right of return" of Palestinian refugees to their former homes in Israel.

In June 2011, the negotiations regarding the formation of a unity government were suspended because of disagreements over who the Prime Minister would be. Fatah insisted on keeping Salam Fayyad. Fayyad was unacceptable for Hamas, who wanted a PM from Gaza. The two factions were also divided over how to deal with Israel. While Fatah favored peace with Israel, Hamas rejected international demands to renounce violence and recognition of Israel's right to exist.

After the talks were indefinitely postponed, President Abbas focused on a bid for UN recognition for Palestinian statehood in September 2011 instead of forming a unity government. The decision was triggered by the breakdown of the Israeli–Palestinian peace talks after Netanyahu's refusal to renew a partial freeze on settlement construction in September 2010, and also by Israel's opposition to the Fatah–Hamas deal itself.

On 30 June 2011, President Abbas expressed his concern over a unity government because of the international opposition, particularly from the US, against a government with any Hamas involvement. He suggested that such a government might be put off at all ahead of a UN vote on statehood.

== 2012 agreements ==
=== February 2012 Doha Agreement ===
The Doha deal, signed by Mahmoud Abbas and Khaled Mashal in February 2012, was described as a step forward in the stalled implementation of the Palestinian reconciliation agreement, signed in Cairo in April 2011.

In March 2012, Abbas stated that there were no political differences between Hamas and Fatah as they had reached agreement on a joint political platform and on a truce with Israel. Commenting on relations with Hamas, Abbas revealed in an interview with Al-Jazeera that "We agreed that the period of calm would be not only in the Gaza Strip, but also in the West Bank," adding that "We also agreed on a peaceful popular resistance [against Israel], the establishment of a Palestinian state along the 1967 borders and that the peace talks would continue if Israel halted settlement construction and accepted our conditions."

On 1 April 2012, the reconciliation implementation, however, was described as "stalling", with no progress on the joint elections scheme. In addition, Fatah said that Hamas security forces had set up roadblocks and arrested dozens of Fatah members and individuals in Gaza, whom they accused of "spreading rumors." In a letter to Binyamin Netanyahu in April 2012, Abbas expressed his regret that Israeli continued to oppose a reconciliation.

=== May 2012 Cairo Agreement ===
In May 2012, Hamas and Fatah signed a further agreement in Cairo for a new unity government and implementation of Palestinian elections, three and a half months after the Doha Agreement. The new Cairo agreement essentially took steps to carry out the previous Doha agreement, particularly the registering of new voters in the Gaza Strip and the formation of an interim government.

== Talks following upgrade of Palestine in UN ==
In December 2012, in the aftermath of the UN status upgrade of the State of Palestine and the conflict in Gaza, calls for a unified Palestinian front have increased and the political leaders of Hamas and Fatah took several steps to reconcile their differences. In a televised address, PA President Mahmoud Abbas stressed that talks with Hamas would immediately follow the Palestinians' bid to upgrade their status at the UN General Assembly—an effort that succeeded. On 13 December, Fatah allowed Hamas to hold its first rally in the West bank since 2007, and on 4 January 2013, Hamas reciprocated by allowing Fatah supporters to hold a rally in Gaza for the first time since the civil war. On 9 January, it was announced that Khaled Mashal and Mahmoud Abbas were holding renewed reconciliation talks in Cairo led by Egyptian president Mohamed Morsi.

== 2014 Gaza and Cairo Agreements ==
On 23 April 2014, Fatah and Hamas signed a new reconciliation agreement, which would see a unity government formed within five weeks, followed by presidential and parliamentary elections within 6 months. On 2 June 2014, President Abbas swore in the new technocratic unity government, headed by the incumbent PM, Rami Hamdallah. The Israeli PM, Benjamin Netanyahu, said that world leaders should not rush to recognize the new government, calling Hamas a terrorist organisation that is committed to the destruction of Israel. The Palestinian PM's office issued a statement denouncing Netanyahu's words as intended to continue Israeli occupation of Palestinian territories. Israel suspended peace talks and announced new sanctions.

As the Government's work did not make progress, also troubled by massive Israeli raids in the West Bank following the kidnapping and murder of three Israeli teenager settlers, and the subsequent major attacks on Gaza during the 2014 Israel–Gaza conflict, the parties signed an additional agreement in Cairo on 25 September 2014. This agreement specified the tasks and responsibilities of the new Government.

== 2016 talks ==
In December 2015 and January 2016 Hamas and Fatah secretly held Qatar-brokered talks in Doha to try and complement the 2014 agreement. Talks were renewed on 7–8 February. In this round of negotiations Egypt was not involved. Hamas issued a brief statement on 8 February, saying both parties reached a practical vision of a solution to be discussed and implemented. Fatah leader Abdullah Abdullah said a solution must force Hamas to cede the Gaza Strip and on 23 February, Fatah political figure Jibril Rajoub made a statement about not allowing Hamas to continue to "seize" the Gaza Strip. Hamas spokesman Sami Abu Zuhri criticized Rajoub's statement, saying it raises tensions and do not serve the reconciliation.

Rajoub's statements provoked condemnation from Palestinian factions, including Hamas and the Palestinian Islamic Jihad as well as the Popular Front for the Liberation of Palestine and the Democratic Front for the Liberation of Palestine, all of which labeled it as detrimental to reconciliation. Hamas demands Fatah's recognition of the events in 2007 and the salary crisis for government employees in Gaza.

Yousef Rizqa, the former minister of information in the previous Hamas government, told Al-Monitor, "The future of the Doha reconciliation talks does not seem positive and we cannot build [a position] upon them in light of the internal Fatah disputes over whether or not to aim for a reconciliation. It seemed to me that the meetings did not offer convincing solutions for fundamental issues, such as the future of the [government] employees in Gaza who have not been paid since 2006 or the Rafah crossing, which is constantly being closed. In addition, Egypt has not given Fatah the green light to complete reconciliation with Hamas, because it seems Cairo will not accept Qatar’s success in a matter in which Egypt has failed."

A Qatari official told Al-Monitor that "Fatah and Hamas agreed not to speak to the media about the details of the reconciliation and avoid statements that could cause tension, in light of past experiences that had previously impeded reconciliation because of statements issued here and there."

Following the talks Fatah officials have threatened to retake Gaza by force. Hamas affiliated website, the Palestinian Information Center reported on 25 February that Fatah plan to retake Gaza with force by inciting an Israeli military operation and convincing Egypt to destroy the tunnels between the Gaza Strip and Egypt to further isolate the Gaza Strip and limit its military abilities which rely in foreign aid.

In two visits of Paul Garnier, Switzerland ambassador to the Palestinian Authority, visited Ismail Haniyeh and on 10 May confirmed Switzerland's intention to broker a conference on reconciliation between Hamas and Fatah. Switzerland was trying to find ways to solve the Gaza government employees crisis.

== 2017–2022 agreements ==
=== 2017 agreement ===
On 12 October 2017, the Fatah–Hamas Agreement, organised under pressure from Qatar, the UAE and Egypt, was signed in Cairo. In the agreement, it is stipulated that Hamas gives Fatah full civilian control of the Gaza Strip, and in return, Gaza's economic blockade would be eased. In the last few months, Hamas has been under heavy pressure by the PA. Punitive measures included cutting the salaries of PA employees living in Gaza and reducing the electricity supply to the Gaza Strip, which already suffers from an electricity crisis due to the Israeli blockade. 3,000 Palestinian Authority police officers will be placed in the enclave. The head of the PA delegation Azzam al-Ahmad said that the Rafah border crossing between Egypt and Gaza would be operated by the presidential guards of PA President Mahmoud Abbas by 1 November.

=== 2020 agreement ===
The reconciliation process between Fatah and Hamas was accelerated during the Trump administration, as US support of Israeli positions made it difficult for the Palestinian Authority to take part in negotiations with Israel. Following the presentation of Trump's peace plan in January 2020, the Palestinian Authority in Ramallah decided to coordinate its struggle against the plan with Hamas. In early September 2020, Abbas held a joint press conference with Hamas leaders, announcing a new dialog for unity agreement. A new agreement for unity government and new elections was announced on 24 September 2020. The agreement was approved by Fatah Central Council on 1 October 2020.

=== 2022 agreement ===
Fourteen different Palestinian factions, including Fatah and Hamas, signed at a ceremony on 13 October 2022 in Algiers, an agreement including provisions to hold presidential and parliamentary elections within a year of its signing. The agreement's provisions were not implemented, and all reconciliation attempts have been frozen since the outbreak of the Gaza war in October 2023.

== Gaza war ==
Following the outbreak of the Gaza war in October 2023 and the Israeli invasion of the Gaza Strip, the Palestinian Authority in Ramallah and the Hamas leadership decided to try to form a unity government to plan for the eventual reconstruction of the Gaza Strip. In February 2024, Palestinian Prime Minister Mohammad Shtayyeh publicly called on Hamas to enter into unity negotiations with Fatah in order to facilitate the reconstruction of Gaza after the war.

In late July 2024, Fatah and Hamas met in Beijing under the auspices of the government of the People's Republic of China to conduct national unity negotiations for three days, ending in leaders of both parties signing on 23 July a joint statement "aimed at ending division and strengthening unity". Twelve other Palestinian factions also participated in the negotiations.

On 9 October, Hamas and Fatah officials met again in Cairo to discuss post-war governance of the Gaza Strip. Following weeks of negotiation, Palestinian officials announced in December that Hamas and Fatah were close to agreeing to form a technocratic committee to govern the Gaza Strip after the Gaza war.

In early 2026, it was reported that Fatah and Hamas were negotiating about a possible dismantling of Hamas government in the Gaza Strip so as to allow the Palestinian authority to receive international legitimacy as the body that would rule over the strip and oversee its reconstruction. No progress was reported throughout 2026 in Fatah-Hamas negotiations, and in May of that year, Hamas leadership called on Fatah to formulate joint strategy regarding the future of Palestine.

== See also ==
- Palestinian Prisoners' Document (2006)
- Palestinian Cairo Declaration (2005)
