= 2014 Fatah–Hamas Agreements =

Reconciliation agreements in Palestine

The 2014 Fatah–Hamas Agreements were two successive reconciliation agreements between Fatah and Hamas, concluded in 2014. The Gaza Agreement was signed in Gaza City on 23 April 2014 by Ismail Haniyeh, the prime minister of the Hamas administration in Gaza, and a senior Palestine Liberation Organisation delegation dispatched by Palestinian President Mahmoud Abbas. Its main purpose was reconciliation between the parties and the formation of a Palestinian Unity Government within five weeks, to be followed by general elections within six months. The Unity Government was formed on 2 June 2014.

On 25 September 2014, almost 4 months after the formation of the Palestinian Unity Government, the parties concluded a second agreement, the Cairo Agreement, in Cairo, between Haniyeh and President Abbas, specifying the tasks and responsibilities of the Unity Government. The Government was to assume responsibilities in the Gaza Strip, work on re-activation of the Palestinian Legislative Council, and implement the 2006 National Conciliation Document and the National Reconciliation Document of 5 April 2011.

== Gaza Agreement, April 2014 ==
The Gaza Agreement was signed in Gaza City on 23 April 2014 by Ismail Haniyeh, the prime minister of the Hamas administration in Gaza, and a senior PLO delegation dispatched by Palestinian President Abbas. Its main purposes were reconciliation between the parties and the formation of a national unity government within five weeks, to be followed by general elections in December.

=== Reactions ===
Mustafa Barghouti, General Secretary of the Palestinian National Initiative, who was involved in the negotiation, described the deal as an "end to the division between the Palestinian people."

Israel reacted angrily to the Fatah–Hamas Gaza Agreement of 23 April 2014. Israel halted peace talks with the Palestinians, saying it "will not negotiate with a Palestinian government backed by Hamas, a terrorist organization that calls for Israel's destruction", and threatened sanctions against the Palestinian Authority, including a previously announced Israeli plan to unilaterally deduct Palestinian debts to Israeli companies from the tax revenue Israel collects for the PA. Israeli Prime Minister Benjamin Netanyahu accused Abbas of sabotaging peace efforts. He said that Abbas cannot have peace with both Hamas and Israel and has to choose. Abbas said the deal did not contradict their commitment to peace with Israel on the basis of a two-state solution and assured reporters that any unity government would recognize Israel, be non-violent, and bound to previous PLO agreements. Shortly after, Israel began implementing economic sanctions against Palestinians and canceled plans to build housing for Palestinians in Area C of the West Bank. Abbas also threatened to dissolve the PA, leaving Israel fully responsible for both the West Bank and Gaza, a threat that the PA has not put into effect.

The United States said it was troubled by the announcement, which "could seriously complicate" negotiations to extend peace negotiations and could implications, inter alia regarding aid.

The European Union welcomed the agreement, but said the priority remains peace talks with Israel.

=== Formation of Palestinian Unity Government ===
A Palestinian Unity Government was formed on 2 June 2014.

== West Bank plot ==
During the 2014 Israel–Gaza conflict, that broke out on 8 July, the Shin Bet revealed an alleged plot by Hamas to depose Fatah rule in the West Bank. This was to be achieved by deploying Hamas cells around the West Bank to incite a third intifada and overwhelm Palestinian Authority forces. More than 90 people were arrested. President Abbas said the plot was "a grave threat to the unity of the Palestinian people and its future."

== Cairo Agreement, September 2014 ==
On 25 September 2014, almost 4 months after the formation of the Unity Government, Haniyeh and Abbas concluded the Cairo Agreement. The Unity Government was to assume responsibilities in the Gaza Strip and the PA was to take control of the border crossings. Furthermore, it would work on lifting the siege and the reconstruction of the Gaza Strip, convene a donor conference, re-activation of the Palestinian Legislative Council, and implement the 2006 National Conciliation Document and the National Reconciliation Document of 5 April 2011.

The Unity Government convened on 9 October 2014 in Gaza, to discuss the reconstruction of the Gaza Strip following the 2014 Israel–Gaza conflict. Hamas was discontented with the government over the failure of the reconstruction process in Gaza, the ongoing closure of the crossings and the failure to settle the issue of the payment of employee salaries, and threatened a vote of no confidence in the PNC in November 2014.

== Dissolution of government ==
President Abbas dissolved the Unity Government on 17 June 2015 saying the government was unable to operate in the Gaza Strip. The general elections stipulated to take place by December 2014 did not eventuate.

== See also ==
- 2017 Fatah–Hamas Agreement
- Palestinian Unity Government of June 2014
