= Fatah–Hamas Mecca Agreement =

2007 accord to form a national unity government in Palestine

- Signed: February 8, 2007
- Location: Mecca, Saudi Arabia
- Signatories: (Fatah) Mahmoud Abbas; Khaled Mashal
- Parties: Fatah; Hamas
- Language: Arabic

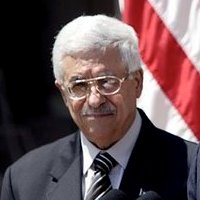
Prime Minister Mahmoud Abbas's visit to the White House in 2003

The Fatah–Hamas Mecca Agreement was signed between Fatah and Hamas in the city of Mecca on 8 February 2007, agreeing to stop the internal military confrontations in the Gaza Strip and form a government of national unity. Representatives from the Fatah side included the President of the Palestinian Authority Mahmoud Abbas and parliament member Mohammed Dahlan. The Palestinian Prime Minister Ismail Haniyeh and Khaled Mashal represented Hamas.

Under the agreement, Hamas agreed to "respect" PLO's previous agreements with Israel.

== Content ==
The Mecca Agreement contains four determinations:

1. Stop and prevent the shedding of Palestinian blood; unite and confront the occupation; adopt the language of dialogue as the sole basis for solving the political disagreements
2. Form a Palestinian national unity government
3. Activate and reform the PLO and accelerate the work of the preparatory committee based on the Cairo and Damascus Understandings
4. Political partnership on the basis of the effective laws in the PNA and on the basis of political pluralism

=== Mecca agreement text ===
The text of the Mecca Agreement:

Based on the generous initiative announced by Saudi King Abdullah Ben Abdul Aziz and under the sponsorship of his majesty, Fatah and Hamas Movements held in the period February 6–8, 2007 in Holy Mecca the dialogues of Palestinian conciliation and agreement and these dialogues, thanks to God, ended with success and an agreement was reached on the following:

First: to stress on banning the shedding of the Palestinian blood and to take all measures and arrangements to prevent the shedding of the Palestinian blood and to stress on the importance of national unity as basis for national steadfastness and confronting the occupation and to achieve the legitimate national goals of the Palestinian people and adopt the language of dialogue as the sole basis for solving the political disagreements on the Palestinian arena.

Within this context, we offer gratitude to the brothers in Egypt and the Egyptian security delegation in Gaza who exerted tremendous efforts to calm the conditions in Gaza Strip in the past period.

Second: Final agreement to form a Palestinian national unity government according to a detailed agreement ratified by both sides and to start on an urgent basis to take the constitutional measures to form this government.

Third: to move ahead in measures to activate and reform the PLO and accelerate the work of the preparatory committee based on the Cairo and Damascus Understandings.

It has been agreed also on detailed steps between both sides on this issue.

Fourth: to stress on the principle of political partnership on the basis of the effective laws in the PNA and on the basis of political pluralism according to an agreement ratified between both parties.

We gladly announce this agreement to our Palestinian masses and to the Arab and Islamic nation and to all our friends in the world. We stress on our commitment to this agreement in text and spirit so that we can devote our time to achieve our national goals and get rid of the occupation and regain our rights and devote work to the main files, mainly Jerusalem, the refugees, the Aqsa Mosque, the prisoners and detainees and to confront the wall and settlements.

=== Mahmoud Abbas's letter to Ismail Haniyeh ===
The agreement was accompanied by a letter that authorized Hamas's leader Ismail Haniyeh to form a government, but on the condition that he "respect" agreements signed by the PLO, including the Oslo Accords. There was significant discussion as to what the word "respect" meant, as Hamas insisted it would "respect" PLO's agreements with Israel without fully "committing itself" to such agreements.

Greetings,

In my capacity as chairman of the PLO Executive Committee and president of the Palestinian National Authority and after reviewing the Basic Law and based on the authorities vested in me: -- First: I commission you to form the next Palestinian government within the set period as stipulated in the Basic Law. -- Second: after concluding the formation of the government and presenting it to us, the government will be presented to the Palestinian Legislative Council to get the confidence vote. -- Third: I call upon you as PM of the next government to abide by the interests of the Palestinian people and to preserve their rights and maintain their accomplishments and develop them and work on achieving their national goals as ratified by the resolutions of the Palestinian National Council (the PLO’s legislative body) meetings and the Basic Law articles and the national conciliation document and Arab summit resolutions and based on this, I call upon you to respect the Arab and international legitimacy resolutions and agreements signed by the PLO.

May God help you in your steps and duties.

— Mahmoud Abbas,

== Aftermath ==
The agreement failed to unite the Palestinian National Authority and the Hamas Administration in Gaza. A further implementation agreement was signed in Doha in 2012, ratified by May 2012 Cairo agreement, both yet failing to promote joint elections. With the boycott of the Hamas, the Palestinian local elections of 2012 took place in October, without participation of Gazan residents.

== See also ==
- Fatah–Hamas reconciliation process
- Palestinian Cairo Declaration
- Palestinian Prisoners' Document
- Middle East peace efforts
