= Fatah–Hamas Doha Agreement =

إعلان الدوحة
- Signed: February 7, 2012
- Mediators: Qatar
- Parties: Hamas; Fatah

The Fatah–Hamas Doha Agreement was a reconciliation attempt between Fatah and Hamas, signed on 7 February 2012. The parties agreed to form an interim national consensus government composed of independent technocrats, to prepare for upcoming elections. It would be led by Palestinian Authority President Mahmoud Abbas. The envisioned government did not materialize.

== The Agreement ==
The Fatah–Hamas Doha agreement was signed on 7 February 2012 by President Mahmoud Abbas and Hamas chief Khaled Mashal in the presence of Qatar's emir Sheikh Hamad bin Khalifa Al Thani, intended to end the Fatah–Hamas conflict. President Mahmoud Abbas would head a unity caretaker cabinet. The Cabinet would be composed of independent technocrats. The task of the new government would be the preparation for upcoming elections and also overseeing reconstruction efforts in the Gaza Strip. Abbas initially wanted Salam Fayyad as PM, but this was rejected by Hamas. Both parties considered PA Prime Minister Salam Fayyad and Hamas' Prime Minister Ismail Haniyeh to become Abbas' deputies.

While the European Union supported the Palestinian reconciliation and elections as important steps toward an eventual Israeli–Palestinian peace deal, Israeli prime minister Benjamin Netanyahu condemned the agreement, saying it would be impossible to reach peace with a government that included Hamas. He said "It is either peace with Hamas or peace with Israel. You can't have them both".

On 18 February 2012, Abbas drew anger from Hamas by declaring that "the next government will remain committed to the obligations and agreements signed by the Palestine Liberation Organisation". According to Hamas, the remarks violated the agreements because the next government would be a national unity government, which "is everyone's government, not one of a particular political group [and] has no political program".

== Aftermath ==
In May 2012, Hamas and Fatah signed a further agreement in Cairo for new unity government and implementation of Palestinian elections, three and a half months after the Doha agreement. The new Cairo agreement essentially took steps to carry out the previous Doha agreement, particularly the registering of new voters in the Gaza Strip and the formation of an interim government.

== See also ==
- Fatah–Hamas reconciliation process
- Fatah–Hamas Mecca Agreement
- List of Middle East peace proposals
