= Issa Qaraqe =

Palestinian politician (born 1961)

Issa Qaraqi
- عيسى قراقع
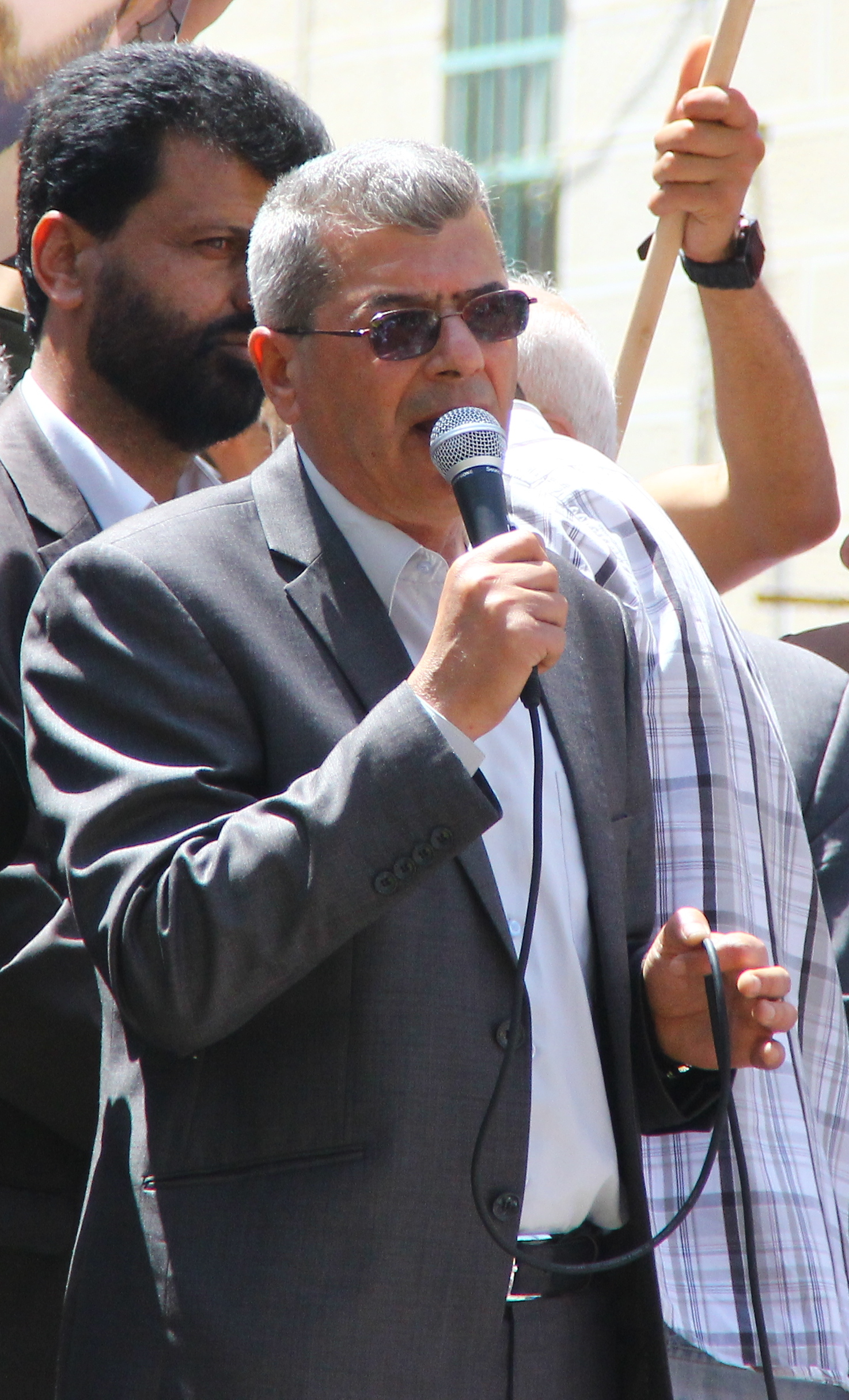

Minister of Prisoners and Prisoners Affairs
- In office June 8, 2009 – August 1, 2018
- Preceded by: Ashraf al-Ajrami
- Succeeded by: Qadri Abu Bakr

President of Palestinian National Library
- Incumbent
- Assumed office July 29, 2021
- Preceded by: Ehab Bessaiso

Member of Palestinian Legislative Council
- In office 2006–2009

Personal details
- Born: عيسى أحمد عبد الحميد قراقع (Arabic); 27 December 1961 (age 64) Aida, West Bank
- Education: Bethlehem University, Birzeit University
- Occupation: Politician

Issa Qaraqe (born; 27 December 1961) is a Palestinian politician who has held various positions in the Palestinian Authority.

== Early life and education ==
He was born on 27 December 1961, in Aida Camp, located in the West Bank. Qaraqi received his bachelor's degree from Bethlehem University and his master's degree in Arabic studies from Birzeit University.

== Career ==
In 2006, Qaraqi was elected to the Palestinian Legislative Council. He served in this position until 2009 when he was appointed Minister of Detainees and Ex-Detainees Affairs. He held this position until 2018, when he was replaced by Qadri Abu Bakr.

In July 2021, Qaraqi was appointed as the President of the Palestinian National Library, replacing Ehab Bessaiso.
