= Izz ad-Din al-Qassam =

Syrian Muslim preacher (1882–1935)

- عز الدين القسام
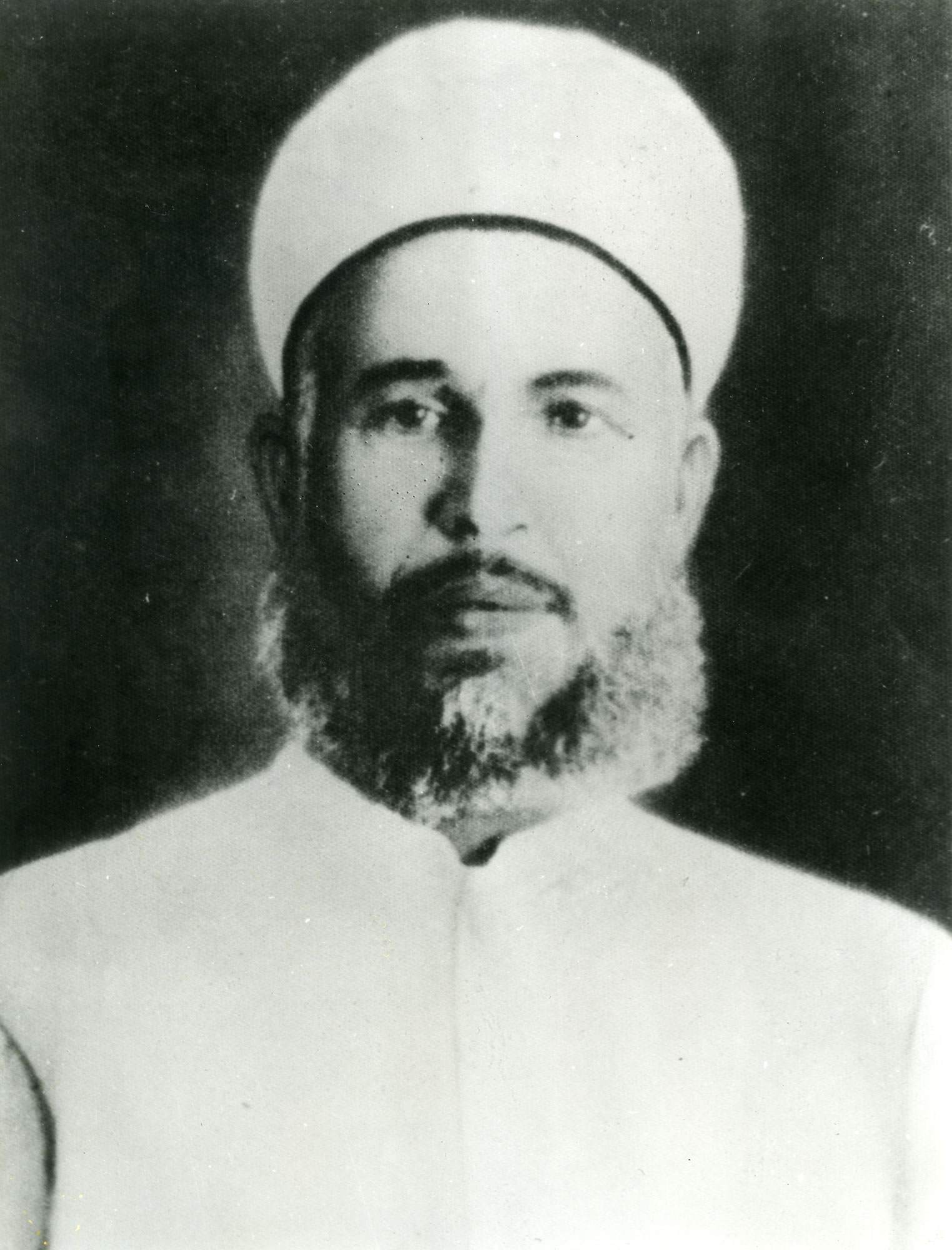
- Born: 19 December 1882; Jableh, Beirut Vilayet, Ottoman Empire
- Died: 20 November 1935 (aged 52); Sheikh Zeid, Jenin Subdistrict, Mandatory Palestine
- Cause of death: Gunshot wounds
- Education: Al-Azhar University
- Occupations: Guerrilla leader, Muslim revivalist, preacher, teacher, imam
- Organization(s): Young Men's Muslim Association, The Black Hand

Religious life
- Religion: Islam
- Denomination: Sunni
- Jurisprudence: Hanafi
- Tariqa: Qadiriyya

ʿIzz ad-Dīn ibn Abd al-Qāder ibn Mustafā ibn Yūsuf ibn Muhammad al-Qassām (Arabic: عز الدين بن عبد القادر بن مصطفى بن يوسف بن محمد القسام; 1881 or 19 December 1882 – 20 November 1935) was a Syrian Muslim preacher, activist, and leader in the struggles against the French in Syria and the British in Palestine, as well as an opponent of Zionism in the 1920s and 1930s.

Qassam was born in Jableh, Syrian province of the Ottoman Empire in 1882. He studied at Al-Azhar University in Egypt and afterward became an Islamic revivalist preacher in his hometown. Following his return, he became an active supporter of the Libyan resistance to the Italian occupation starting 1911, raising funds and fighters to aid the Libyans and penning an anthem for them. He would later lead his own group of rebels in alliance with Ibrahim Hananu to fight against the French Mandate in northern Syria ratified on 29 September 1923.

Following the rebels' defeat, he immigrated to Palestine, where he became a Muslim waqf (religious endowment) official and grew incensed at the plight of Palestinian Arab peasants. He advocated a moral, political and military jihad as the solution to end British rule and Zionist aspirations in Palestine. In the 1930s, he formed bands of local fighters, including the Black Hand, and launched attacks against British and Zionist targets. He was eventually killed in a manhunt by the British authorities in 1935, following his alleged role in the killing of a policeman. Israeli historian Tom Segev has called him "the Arab Joseph Trumpeldor". His campaign and death were factors that led to the 1936–1939 Arab revolt in Palestine.

== Early life and Islamic scholarship ==
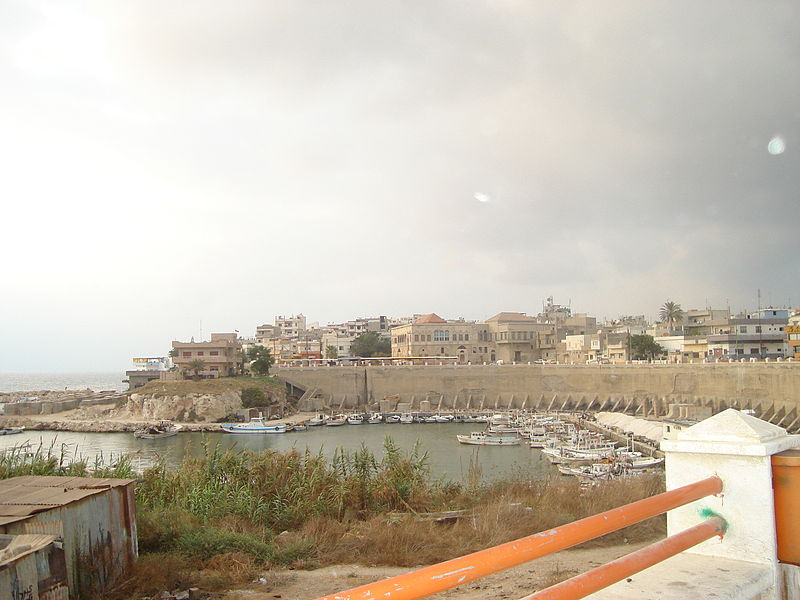
Al-Qassam was born in Jableh

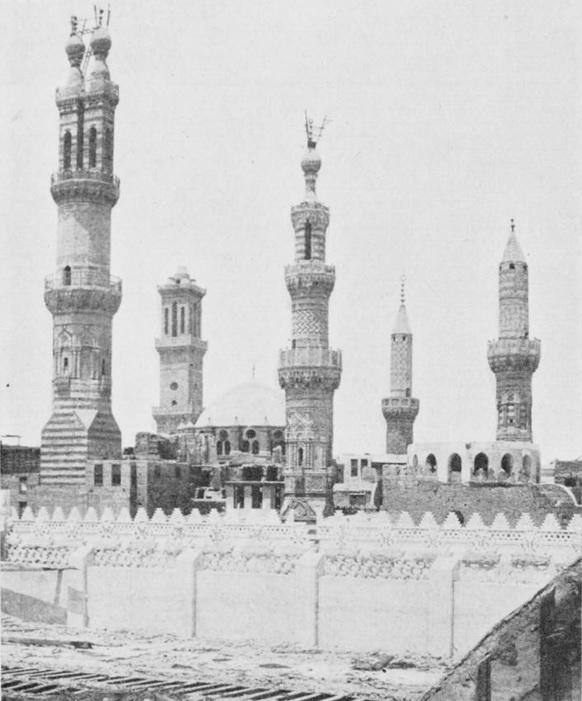
Al-Azhar Mosque, where al-Qassam studied, in 1906

Al-Qassam was born in Jableh, near Latakia in northwestern Syria, to mother Ḥalīma Qaṣṣāb and father ʿAbd al-Qādir al-Qassām, a sharia court official during Ottoman rule and a local leader of the Qadiriyya Sufi order. His grandfather had been a leading sheikh of the Qadiriyya order and moved to Jableh from Iraq. Al-Qassam also followed the Hanafi school of fiqh (jurisprudence) of Sunni Islam and studied at the local Istambuli Mosque under the teaching of well-known ′alim (scholar) Sheikh Salim Tayarah.

Sometime between 1902 and 1905, al-Qassam went to Cairo to study at al-Azhar University. The scholars with whom he studied are disputed by the sources; some accounts say he studied under the Muslim reformist scholar Muhammad Abduh and came into contact with the prominent proto-Salafist, Rashid Rida, who himself studied under Abduh, while others are skeptical of al-Qassam's relationships with either. However, the attitude al-Qassam later adopted toward the political issues in the Arab world suggests he was well acquainted with the ideas that Abduh and Rida espoused. At al-Azhar, al-Qassam developed the thinking that would guide his future activism. Critical of a stagnant Islam, he preached among the ranks of farmers and other locals about the necessity for a modern Islam, one capable of defending itself from Western colonialism through jihad (holy struggle). He returned to Jableh in 1909 as an Azharī ʿālim and worked as a teacher at a Qadiriyya madrasa (Islamic school) where he taught both the mystical practices of the Qadiriyya Sufi order and the jurisprudence and commentary of the Qur'an. In addition, he preached as the imam of the Ibrahim Ibn Adham Mosque.

Following his return to Jableh, al-Qassam commenced a program of Islamic revival based on moral reforms which included the encouragement of maintaining regular salaah (prayer) and the sawm (fasting) during Ramadan as well as advocating an end to gambling and alcohol consumption. Al-Qassam's campaign highly influenced Jableh's residents who increasingly adopted his reforms. He developed amiable relations with the local Ottoman police who he would call upon to enforce sharia on rare cases of major violations. In some occasions, he would send disciples as vigilantes to intercept caravans transporting alcohol which would then be disposed of. Despite the support for Arab nationalism from some of his fellow alumni at al-Azhar and among Syrian notables, al-Qassam's loyalties at the time most likely laid with the Ottoman Empire as his relationship with the authorities would indicate. He was well regarded among much of Jableh's population where he gained a reputation for piety, simple manners and good humor.

== Support for Libyan resistance ==
Ya Rahim, Ya Rahman
Unsur Maulana as-Sultan
Wa ksur aadana al-Italiyan
O Most Merciful, O Most Compassionate
Make our Lord the Sultan victorious
And defeat our enemy the Italian

— Izz al-Din al-Qassam, Ottoman-Libyan resistance anthem, 1911

Following Italy's September 1911 invasion of Libya, al-Qassam began collecting funds in Jableh for the joint Ottoman-Libyan resistance movement and composed a victory anthem. Jableh's district governor sought to gain control over the fundraiser, and when locals nevertheless continued to send their donations to al-Qassam, the governor attempted to have him jailed. The district governor alleged that al-Qassam was working against the Ottoman state, but an official investigation found him not guilty, and the governor was consequently dismissed.

In June 1912, during one of his Friday prayer sermons, he called for volunteers to engage in a jihad against the Italians. Accepting only volunteers with prior Ottoman military training, al-Qassam enlisted dozens of volunteers and set up a fund for the expedition to Libya as well as a small pension for the families of volunteers while they were abroad. Although accounts vary, al-Qassam was accompanied by 60 to 250 volunteers known as mujahideen (those who engage in jihad) when he arrived in Alexandretta in the latter part of that year. Intending to gain sea transportation from the Ottomans, al-Qassam's request was rejected by the authorities, who ordered him and his men back to Jableh. A new Ottoman government in Istanbul had gained power and shifted the state's focus to the Balkan front in October, abandoning the Libyan resistance. Part of the money that was raised was then used to establish a madrasa in Jableh while the remainder was saved for future efforts.

== Anti-French resistance in Syria ==
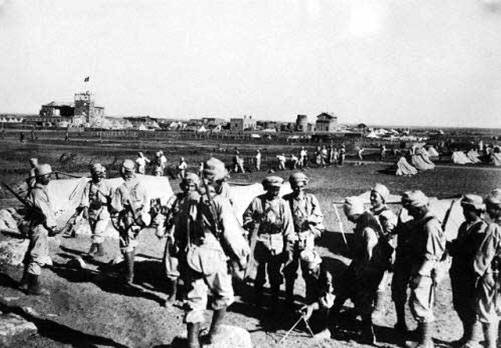
The French Army occupying the Syrian coast in the lead up of the Battle of Maysalun 1920

He later enlisted in the Ottoman army when World War I broke out, where he received military training and was attached as a chaplain to a base near Damascus. Returning to Jableh before the war's end, al-Qassam used funds from his planned expedition to Libya to organize a local defense force to fight the French occupation. His principal role in the local resistance was financing the acquisition of weapons for Jableh's militia. By 1919, French forces moved into the coastal area of northern Syria while Faisal I established the Kingdom of Syria in Damascus as an independent Arab state. During this period, al-Qassam's Jableh militia fought against local French-backed Alawite militiamen who occupied areas around the city. The Alawites were eventually repelled, but French forces moved in soon after to consolidate their control. Consequently, al-Qassam and many of his disciples left Jableh for Mount Sahyun where he established a base near the village of Zanqufeh to launch guerrilla raids against the French Army.

Al-Qassam's militia grew when it was joined by another militia based in the mountains following the death of its commander Umar al-Bitar. However, as the French tightened their control of the area, they were able to successfully pressure several of Jableh's major landowners to drop their financial support for al-Qassam and pay taxes to the French Mandate government. This further isolated al-Qassam, who decided to flee Mount Sahyun for Aleppo in May 1920. There he and his fighters joined ranks with Ibrahim Hananu, who was leading attacks against the French Army until the latter captured Jisr ash-Shugur in July. As a result of this French victory and the impending capitulation of Aleppo, al-Qassam and members of his unit fled past French Army lines with forged passports to Tartus.

== Activism in Palestine ==
=== Establishment in Haifa ===
From Tartus, al-Qassam travelled to Beirut by boat and then to Haifa, then under the British Mandate, where his wife and daughters later joined him. In 1921, al-Qassam was hired to teach at the Madrasa Islamiya, an Islamic educational institution with many schools in Haifa and its periphery. It was funded by the Jamiat Islamiya, a waqf (religious endowment) administered by prominent Muslims from the city. Unlike other Muslim scholars, al-Qassam made himself easily accessible to the public and often arrived late to teach his classes because he was frequently stopped by passersby for advice. He resigned from his teaching career due to the school's insistence that he maintain consistent hours. As part of his Islamic revivalist teaching, he denounced and discouraged some local Palestinian traditions, including unorthodox funeral rituals, mothers' visitation to the al-Khidr shrine on nearby Mount Carmel to give thanks for their children's well-being or achievements and tribal dances around religious sites, as superstitious innovations to Islam.

Al-Qassam first preached in the Jurayneh Mosque. In 1922, the Supreme Muslim Council appointed al-Qassam as a preacher at the newly established Istiqlāl (Independence) Mosque. According to Philip Mattar, al-Qassam "preached to young Muslims a puritanical way of life and Islamic precepts, including avoiding gaming clubs, taverns, and brothels. His teachings sufficiently alarmed some people that his dismissal was sought."

According to Abdallah Schleifer, Al-Qassam concentrated his activities on the lower classes, setting up a night school for casual labourers and preaching to them as an imam. According to Tom Segev, he would seek them out on the streets, in brothels and hashish dens. Al-Qassam's greatest following came from the landless ex-tenant farmers drifting into Haifa from the Upper Galilee where purchases of agricultural land by the Jewish National Fund and Hebrew labour policies excluding Arabs had dispossessed many of their traditional livelihoods. Al-Qassam grew increasingly popular with northern Palestine's poorer Muslims and was frequently sought out to preach at Mawlid celebrations.

In May 1928, he, Rashīd al-Hājj Ibrāhīm (1889–1953), and others established a branch in Haifa of the Jamʿiyyat al-Shubbān al-Muslimīn (the Young Men’s Muslim Association or YMMA, founded in Cairo in 1927 and modeled after the YMCA).

In 1929, he was appointed the marriage registrar (مأذون maʾdhūn) at the sharia court in Haifa by the waqf authorities in Jerusalem, a role that required him to travel throughout Palestine. He encouraged the inhabitants of the northern villages to set up agricultural cooperatives. According to Philip Mattar, he warned Palestinians villagers that the British Mandate was "facilitating Jewish immigration and land purchases that would lead ultimately to a Jewish state" and he "therefore advocated clandestine military preparation for a popular uprising against the British once the Palestinians were united and organised." According to the American historian Edmund Burke, al-Qassam was

An individual deeply imbued with the Islamic social gospel and who was struck by the plight of Palestinian peasants and migrants. Al-Qassam's pastoral concern was linked to his moral outrage as a Muslim at the ways in which the old implicit social compact was being violated in the circumstances of British mandatory Palestine. This anger fueled a political radicalism that drove him eventually to take up arms and marks him off from the Palestinian notable politicians.

He also took advantage of his travels to deliver fiery political and religious sermons in which he encouraged villagers to organise resistance units to attack the British and Jews. He intensified his agitation and obtained a fatwa from Shaykh Badr al-Din al-Taji al-Hasani, the Mufti of Damascus, which ruled that the struggle against the British and the Jews was permissible.

=== Relationship with local leaders ===
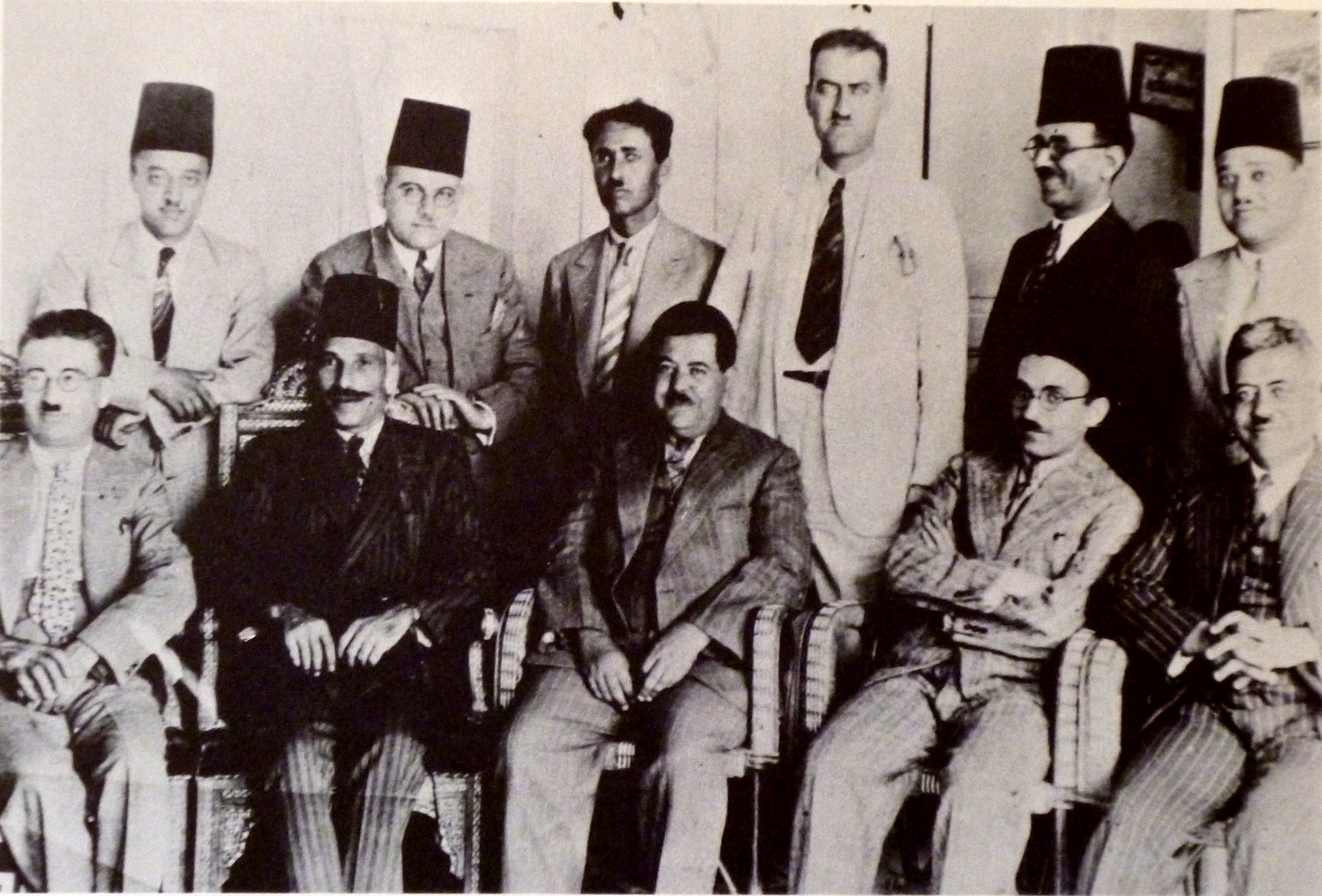
Leading members of Hizb al-Istiqlal, 1932. Al-Qassam was closely associated with the party, particularly with Rashid al-Hajj Ibrahim, seated second from left

According to Israeli historian Shai Lachman, between 1921 and 1935 al-Qassam often cooperated with Hajj Amin al-Husseini, the Grand Mufti of Jerusalem. They were initially on good terms, and al-Qassam's various official appointments required the mufti's prior consent. Lachman suggests that their cooperation increased after the 1929 riots, in which one source claims al-Qassam's men were active. The two fell out in the mid-1930s, perhaps due to al-Qassam's independent line of activism. In 1933, al-Qassam sent an emissary to al-Husseini, requesting the latter's participation in a revolt against the British. At the time, al-Husseini refused, preferring a political solution.

From 1928 until his death, al-Qassam served as the president of the Young Men's Muslim Association (YMMA) in Haifa. While he focused his activism with the lower classes, his position in the YMMA afforded him access with the middle and educated classes of the city who were attracted to Hizb al-Istiqlal (Independence Party), an Arab nationalist political party. In particular, he developed a strong relationship with leading local party member Rashid al-Hajj Ibrahim, the previous president of the Haifa YMMA. A wide ideological gap between the secularist al-Istiqlal and al-Qassam was bridged by a convergence in the view that the struggle against Zionist expansion in Palestine was inseparable from active opposition to British rule. This view separated al-Qassam and al-Istiqlal from the mainstream political forces in Palestine at the time. While men from al-Istiqlal and the YMMA generally refrained from joining al-Qassam's cause, his association with them helped protect him from political figures who opposed his activism. His activities were also financed by several well-off businessmen associated with al-Istiqlal due to his spreading reputation.

=== Organisation of armed resistance groups ===
In 1930 or 1931, al-Qassam had recruited numerous hand-picked followers and organised them into about a dozen different circles, each group of supporters unaware of the existence of the other groups. The majority of his men were peasants and urban labourers. The majority of al-Qassam's circles were based in northern Palestine, but he had disciples throughout the country, including in Gaza in the south. In contrast to traditional Palestinian leaders who campaigned against Zionist settlement while avoiding confrontation with the British authorities, al-Qassam saw it as a priority to fight against both. He also saw the brewing conflict in Palestine as a religious struggle, unlike most Palestinian leaders who advocated a secular and nationalist response. Al-Qassam advocated a moral, political and military jihad as the solution to end British rule and Zionist aspirations in Palestine.

In training his men, al-Qassam stressed that maintaining good character was of paramount importance. As such, fighters should provide for the needy, aid people with illness, maintain good ties with their families and pray regularly to God. These virtues, he claimed, were prerequisites to being disciplined and fearless fighters. The moral component of al-Qassam's teachings were especially geared towards the young men of Haifa's labour slums who lived away from their families and who were exposed to activities considered immoral in Islam. He viewed marriage as key to preventing the moral corruption of young men and managed to financially aid his more destitute supporters with their wedding expenses. He encouraged his men to grow beards as a sign of their commitment to jihad and to carry a Qur'an with them wherever they went. Although many of his followers had been illiterate, he taught them how to read and write using the Qur'an as their basis for learning. Al-Qassam also asked his fighters to engage in the spiritual exercises practiced by the Qadiriyya Sufi order and to recite Sufi chants before battle.

The guerrilla bands became known as the Black Hand (al-kaff al-aswad), an anti-Zionist and anti-British militant organisation. The idea for such a group appeared to have crystallised after the 1929 riots. From the outset, a split occurred in the movement. One faction led by Abu Ibrahim al-Kabir argued for immediate attacks against British and Zionist targets, while the other faction, headed by al-Qassam, thought than an armed revolt was premature and risked exposing the group's preparations.

By 1935, al-Qassam had recruited several hundred men—the figures range from 200 to 800—organised in cells of five men, and arranged military training for peasants. The cells were equipped with bombs and firearms, which they used to raid Jewish settlements and sabotage British-built rail lines. Though striking a responsive chord among the rural poor and urban underclass, al-Qassam's movement deeply perturbed the Muslim urban elite as it threatened their political and patronage connections with the British Mandatory authorities. Following the October 1935 discovery of a clandestine cache of arms in the port of Jaffa apparently originating from Belgium and destined for the Haganah, a Jewish paramilitary force, Palestinian Arab indignation broke out in two general strikes. The arms shipment to the Haganah served as the final impetus for al-Qassam to launch a revolt against the authorities.

== Death ==
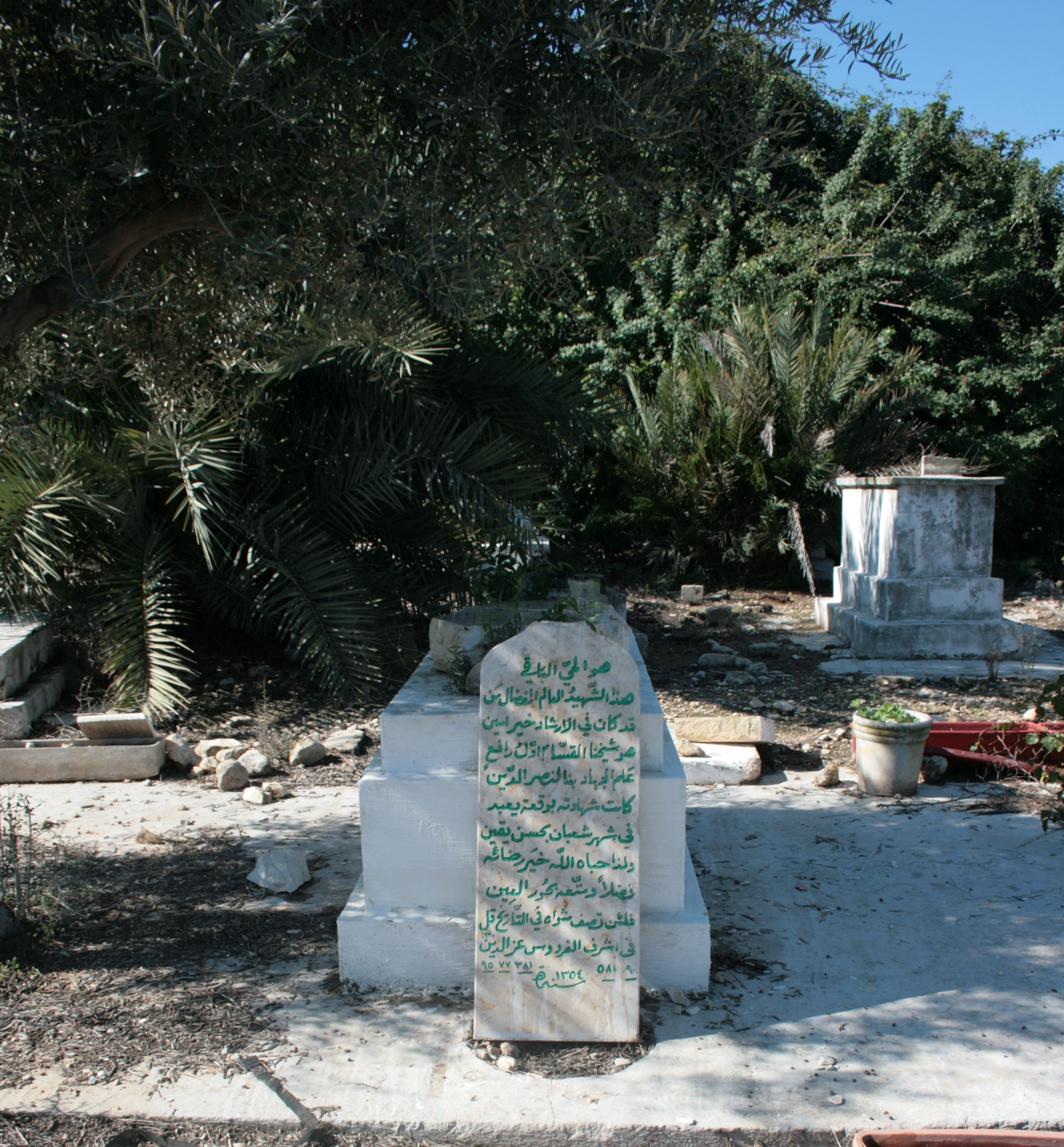
Al-Qassam's grave in Balad al-Sheikh, 2010

On 8 November 1935 the body of Moshe Rosenfeld, a Jewish sergeant in the Palestine Police, was discovered near Ein Harod. Al-Qassam and his followers were believed to have been responsible and search parties set out to capture him. In this context, al-Qassam and twelve of his men left Haifa and went underground, taking to the hills between Jenin and Nablus. There they spent ten days on the move, during which they were fed by the residents of villages in the area. The British police manhunt eventually surrounded al-Qassam in a cave near Ya'bad, in the village of Sheikh Zeid; In the long ensuing firefight, al-Qassam and three of his followers were killed, and five captured on 20 November. one British police constable was killed in the battle. A senior British police official flew a light plane over the site to monitor the gun battle and ensure that the "existential threat to British power" was eliminated.

The manner of his last stand galvanized Palestinians at the time, according to American historian Abdallah Schleifer:

Surrounded, he told his men to die as martyrs, and opened fire. His defiance and manner of his death (which stunned the traditional leadership) electrified the Palestinian people. Thousands forced their way past police lines at the funeral in Haifa, and the secular Arab nationalist parties invoked his memory as the symbol of resistance. It was the largest political gathering ever to assemble in mandatory Palestine.

To the surprise of the Palestine Police Force, al-Qassam's funeral, which was held at the Al-Jarina Mosque, attracted at least 3,000 mourners, mostly members of the peasant and working classes. His coffin and those of his slain comrades were draped in the flags of Yemen, Saudi Arabia, and Iraq, the only three independent Arab countries at the time. In reaction to al-Qassam's death, strikes were held in Haifa and several Palestinian and Syrian cities. Al-Qassam is buried at the Muslim cemetery at the former Palestinian village of Balad al-Sheikh, now Nesher, a Jewish suburb of Haifa. An obituary for al-Qassam was published in the Egyptian newspaper Al-Ahram on 22 November, eulogizing him as a "martyr" with the following statement: "I heard you preaching from up in the pulpit, summoning to the sword ... Through your death you are more eloquent than ever you were in life."

== Legacy ==
Five months after al-Qassam's death, members of his movement, known as "Qassamiyun" or "Qassamites", also Ikhwan al-Qassam, (the Brothers of al-Qassam) under the leadership of Farhan al-Sa'di, al-Qassam's spiritual heir, shot and killed two Jewish passengers on a bus and shot three Jewish drivers, killing two, in the 1936 Anabta shooting, acts that became major contributing factors in the start of the 1936–1939 Arab revolt in Palestine. Peasant and urban guerrilla factions (fasa'il) led by the Qassamiyun played a significant role in commencing the countrywide revolt. At the start of the revolt, al-Qassam's close disciples al-Sa'di, Abu Ibrahim al-Kabir, and Attiyah Ahmad Awad led fasa'il in the Jenin region, the Upper Galilee and Balad al-Sheikh, respectively.

Al-Qassam, according to Palestinian-American Rashid Khalidi,

played a crucial role in winning the populace away from the elite-brokered politics of compromise with the British, and in showing them the "correct" path of popular armed struggle against the British and the Zionists.

The first Israeli prime minister, David Ben-Gurion, compared the glory that al-Qassam's actions aroused in the 1930s to the fame won in Zionist discourse by Zionist activist Joseph Trumpeldor who died in a battle with Arab forces. Recalling this, Israeli historian Tom Segev has argued that "The terrorists that al-Qassam led and the intifada fighters, more recently, may also be likened to the terrorists that Menachem Begin led."

Although al-Qassam's revolt was unsuccessful in his lifetime, militant organizations gained inspiration from his example. His funeral drew thousands, which turned into a mass demonstration of national unity. The Palestinian fedayeen who emerged in the 1960s saw al-Qassam as their originator. The founders of the Palestinian nationalist armed movement Fatah had initially considered naming their group the "Qassamiyun". Leila Khaled, a well-known member of the Popular Front for the Liberation of Palestine, once stated that her organization began "where al-Qassam left off: his generation started the revolution, my generation intends to finish it."

The military wing of the Palestinian Islamist armed movement Hamas, the Izz ad-Din al-Qassam Brigades, bears his name as does the Qassam rocket, a short-range rocket the group produces and uses.

== Bibliography ==
- Abū ʻAmr, Z. (1994). Islamic Fundamentalism in the West Bank and Gaza: Muslim Brotherhood and Islamic Jihad. Indiana University Press. p. 98.
- Benvenisti, M. (2000). Sacred Landscape: The Buried History of the Holy Land Since 1948. University of California Press. p. 297. ISBN 9780520211544. "Balad Sheikh."
- Fleischmann, Ellen (2003). The Nation and Its New Women: The Palestinian Women's Movement, 1920–1948. University of California Press. p. 292. ISBN 0520237900.
- Bloomfield, Jonathan (2010). Palestine. AuthorHouse. p. 149. ISBN 9781452067841.
- Judis, J. (2014). Genesis: Truman, American Jews, and the Origins of the Arab/Israeli Conflict. Macmillan. ISBN 9781429949101.
- Guidère, M. (2012). Historical Dictionary of Islamic Fundamentalism. Scarecrow Press. ISBN 9780810879652.
- Johnson, Nels (2013). Islam and the Politics of Meaning in Palestinian Nationalism. Routledge. p. 43. ISBN 9781134608584.
- Kayyali, Abdul-Wahhab Said (1978). Palestine: A Modern History. Croom Helm. p. 180. ISBN 0856646350.
- Kimmerling, B.; Migdal, J. S. (2003). The Palestinian People: A History. Harvard University Press.
- Krämer, G. (2011). A History of Palestine: From the Ottoman Conquest to the Founding of the State of Israel. Princeton University Press. ISBN 978-0691150079.
- Lachman, Shai (1982). "Arab Rebellion and Terrorism in Palestine 1929–1939". In Kedourie, Elie; Haim, Sylvie G. (eds.). Zionism and Arabism in Palestine and Israel. Frank Cass. ISBN 978-0-714-63169-1.
- Laurens, H. (2002). La Question de Palestine. Vol. 2. Paris: Fayard.
- Lozowick, Y. (2004). Right to Exist: A Moral Defense of Israel's Wars. Random House. p. 78. ISBN 9781400032433.
- Mattar, P. (1992). The Mufti of Jerusalem: Al-Hajj Amin Al-Husayni and the Palestinian National Movement. Columbia University Press. ISBN 9780231064637.
- Matthews, Weldon C. (2006). Confronting an Empire, Constructing a Nation: Arab Nationalists and Popular Politics in Mandate Palestine. I B Tauris. ISBN 978-1-84511-173-1.
- Milton-Edwards, Beverley (1999). Islamic Politics in Palestine. I.B. Tauris. ISBN 9781860644757.
- Moubayed, S. (2006). Steel and Silk: Men and Women Who Shaped Syria 1900–2000. Cune Press. ISBN 9781885942418.
- Nafi, B. (1997). "Shaykh Izz al-Din al-Qassam: A Reformist and a Rebel Leader". Journal of Islamic Studies. 8 (2): 185–215. doi:10.1093/jis/8.2.185.
- Sanagan, Mark (2013). "Teacher, Preacher, soldier, Martyr: Rethinking 'Izz al-Din al-Qassam". Die Welt des Islams. 53 (3–4): 315–352. doi:10.1163/15685152-5334p0002.
- Schleifer, A. (1993). "Palestinian Peasantry in the Great Revolt". In Edmund Burke (ed.). Struggle and Survival in the Modern Middle East. University of California Press. ISBN 0-520-07988-4.
- Segev, T. (2001). One Palestine, Complete. Macmillan Publishers. ISBN 0-8050-6587-3.
