= Qadura Fares =

Palestinian politician

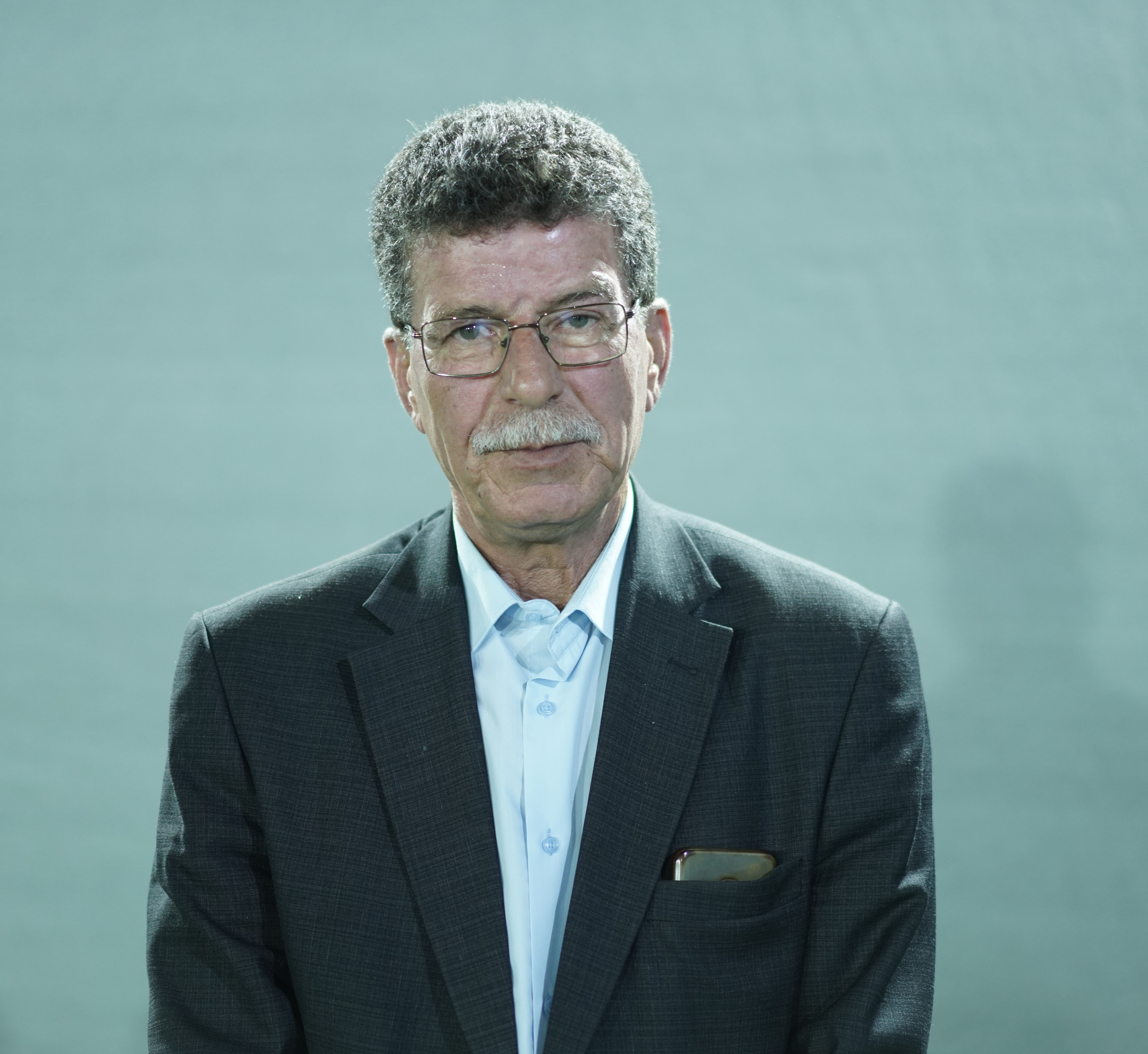

Minister for Detainees and Ex-Detainees Affairs
- In office 7 August 2023 – 18 February 2025
- President: Mahmoud Abbas
- Prime Minister: Mohammad Shtayyeh; Mohammad Mustafa
- Preceded by: Qadri Abu Bakr

Palestinian Authority Minister without Portfolio
- In office 2003–2005
- Prime Minister: Ahmed Qurei

Member of the Palestinian Legislative Council
- In office 1996–2006
- Constituency: Fatah

Head of the Palestinian Prisoners Club
- Incumbent
- Assumed office 2011

Minister of State for the Affairs of Colonization and Wall Resistance Commission
- Incumbent
- Assumed office 2003

Qadura Fares (Arabic: قدّورة فارس) is a Palestinian politician. He was a Palestinian Authority minister without portfolio under Prime Minister Ahmed Qurei from 2003 to 2005, and a member of the Palestinian Legislative Council for Fatah from 1996 to 2006. He is a close friend, aide and adviser to senior Fatah leader Marwan Barghouti. Fares is regarded as one of the principal architects of Fatah's 'young guard' movement, who briefly formed the al-Mustaqbal or "Future" list (2005) before joining with Mahmoud Abbas to form a united Fatah list for the upcoming elections.

From 1981 to 1994, Fares was in Israeli prisons, where he became fluent in Hebrew. In 1996, he was elected to the Palestinian Legislative Council representing Ramallah and Al-Bireh.

Fares was not nominated in the united list for the 2006 elections, and ran unsuccessfully as an independent in the Ramallah district. Also, since at least 2011, Fares has been consistently referred to as the "head" of the Palestinian Prisoners Club, so it is unclear exactly what position Fares actually holds as he is not listed as either the President nor the Executive Director of the club, positions clearly identified with other individuals.

In 2003, he was appointed Minister of State for the Affairs of Colonization and Wall Resistance Commission.

Fares began his term as Minister for Detainees and Ex-Detainees Affairs on 7 August 2023, succeeding Qadri Abu Bakr, who had died in a car accident in early July. Palestinian president Mahmoud Abbas fired Fares on 18 February 2025 after he criticized Abbas's move to base payments for the Palestinian Authority Martyrs Fund, often referred to as "pay-for-slay" on financial need. Hamas described Fares' firing as "submission to Zionist and American dictates."

== Personal ==
Euronews described Fares as popular among Palestinian prisoners.
