= Kabha =

Kabha (Arabic: كبها) is an Arabic surname. Notable people with the surname include:

- Marwan Kabha (born 1991), Israeli footballer
- Mustafa Kabha (born 1962), Palestinian historian, philologist, and professor
- Wasfi Kabha (1959–2021), Palestinian politician
