= Wasfi Kabha =

Palestinian politician (died 2021)

Minister of Prisoners' Affairs of the Palestinian National Authority
- In office March 2006 – March 2007
- Preceded by: ?
- Succeeded by: Ashraf al-Ajrami

Minister of State in Palestinian National Unity Government
- Incumbent
- Assumed office March 2007

Personal details
- Born: 19 June 1959 Barta'a, West Bank
- Died: 2021 (aged 61–62) Barta'a

Wasfi Kabha (Arabic: وصفي كبهة) (1959 – November 2021) was a Palestinian politician. He was Minister of Prisoners' Affairs of the Palestinian National Authority in the Palestinian Government of March 2006 and Minister of State in Palestinian National Unity Government of March 2007. He was one of the most prominent leaders of the Islamic movement in the West Bank.

After the Hamas takeover of the Gaza Strip in 2007, President Mahmoud Abbas acquitted all Hamas cabinet members including Kabha, who was replaced by Ashraf al-Ajrami.

== Israeli detention ==
Wasfi Kabha was kidnapped by the Israeli authorities in June 2006, along with other Hamas ministers and parliament members in a clampdown against their organization. During his nearly five-week detainment he claimed to have been abused by his interrogators.

Kabha was seized again in May 2007 and detained for three years.

On 21 May 2015, he was released by the Israeli authorities after spending 10 months in administrative detention.

== Death ==
Kabha died of complications from COVID-19 in Barta'a in November 2021, at the age of 69.

== See also ==
- 2006 Gaza conflict
- Nasser al-Shaer
