= Palestinian National Library =

National library located in Ramallah, West Bank, Palestine

- المكتبة الوطنية الفلسطينية
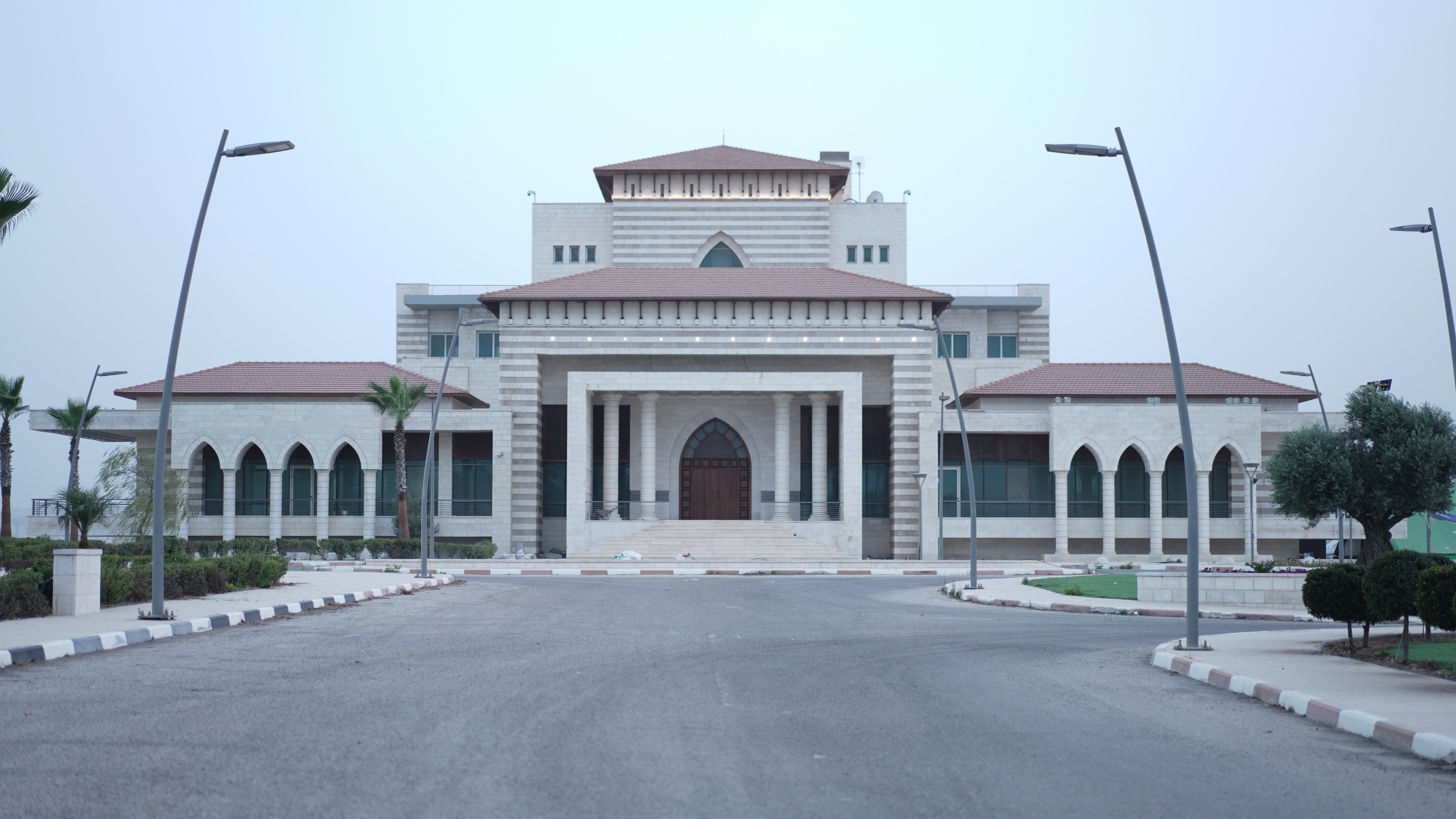
- 31.933906°N 35.194363°E
- Location: Surda, Ramallah, Palestine
- Type: National library
- Established: 2019

Collection
- Items collected: Books, journals, manuscripts, maps, photographs, and other materials related to Palestinian history, culture, and society
- Size: 200,000+

Other information
- Director: Issa Qaraqe

The Palestinian National Library (Arabic: المكتبة الوطنية الفلسطينية) is a national library located in Ramallah, in the West Bank, Palestine. It was also known as the National Library of Palestine. It was established in 2019 and is located in Surda, a village near Ramallah. The library covers an area of 4,700 square meters and serves as a repository of Palestinian cultural heritage and knowledge.

Ehab Bessaiso was appointed as the first chairperson of the library in 2019. He was later replaced by Issa Qaraqe.

The library's collection includes books, journals, manuscripts, maps, photographs, and other materials related to Palestinian history, culture, and society. The library also collects materials related to the Arab-Israeli conflict and the Palestinian diaspora. It is the largest library in Palestine and at its founding held more than 200,000 books and other items. The library joined the International Federation of Library Associations and Institutions in January 2023.

Since its foundation, the library has struggled to obtain sufficient funding to cover operating costs and staff salaries.
