= Abu Qash =

- Municipality type C

Arabic transcription(s)
  - Arabic: ابو قش
  - Latin: Abu Qash (official); Abu Qashsh (unofficial)
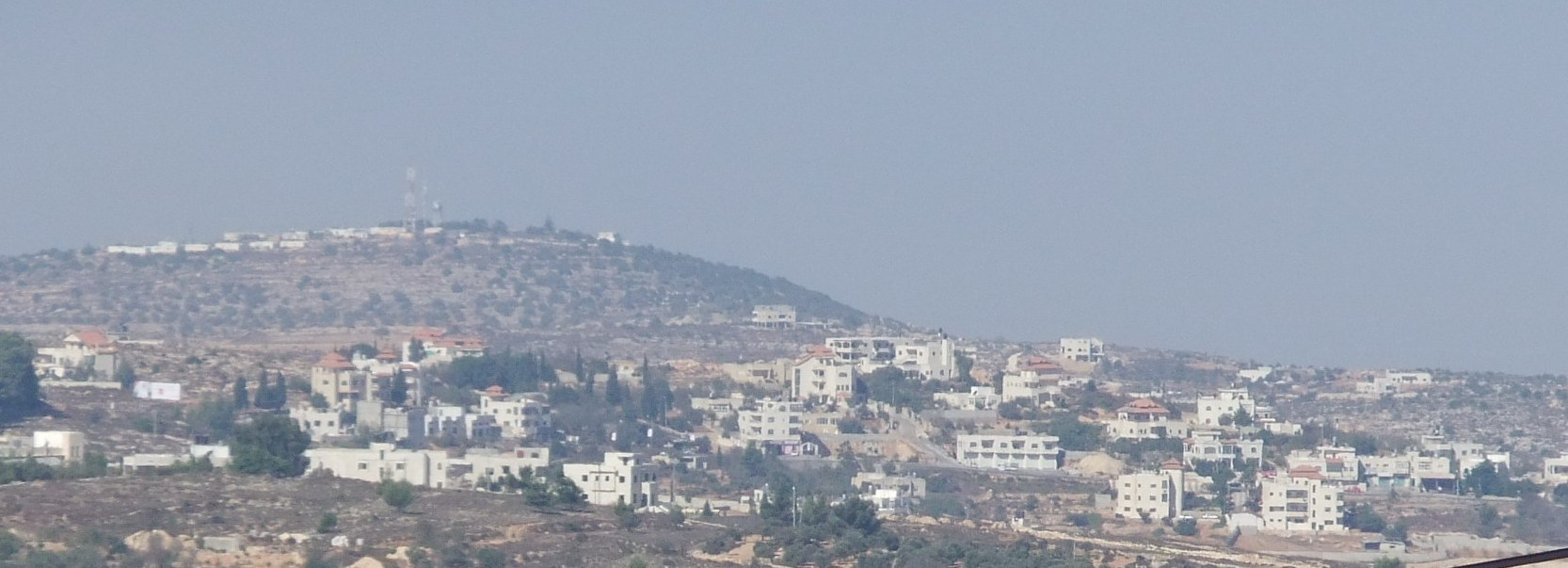

- Location of Abu Qash within Palestine
- Coordinates: 31°57′04″N 35°11′03″E
- Palestine grid: 167/150
- State: State of Palestine
- Governorate: Ramallah and al-Bireh

Government
  - Type: Municipality

Population (2017)
  - Total: 2,237
- Name meaning: the father of Kǔsh (a bucket)

Abu Qash (Arabic: ابو قش) is a Palestinian village located in the Ramallah and al-Bireh Governorate in the northern West Bank, located north of Ramallah and south of the Birzeit University. According to the 2017 census conducted by the Palestinian Central Bureau of Statistics, it had a population of 2,237.

== Location ==
Abu Qash is located 5.3 kilometers (3.3 mi) north of Ramallah. It is bordered by Surda and Jifna to the east, Bir Zeit to the north, Al-Zaytouneh and Ramallah to the west, and by Ramallah and Surda to the south.

== History ==
Abu Qash was founded in the Ottoman period by settlers from Beitunia during the Qays–Yaman war.

Earlier remains found at the site include two tombs dating to the Byzantine period, and sherds from both the Byzantine and Mamluk eras.

=== Ottoman era ===
Sherds from the early Ottoman era have also been found here. In 1838 it was noted by Edward Robinson as a Muslim village, Abu Kush, in Beni Harith district, north of Jerusalem.

In 1863 Victor Guérin noted it as "A hamlet of about twenty houses, situated on a high hill, the slopes of which are partly covered with vines, olive trees and fig trees."

An Ottoman village list of about 1870 indicated that the village had 25 houses and a population of 78, though the population count included men, only. It was further noted that it was located just west of Surda.

In 1882 the PEF's Survey of Western Palestine (SWP) described Abu Kush as: "a very small hamlet, with a well on the north, on an ancient road, with a few olives near."

In 1896 the population of Abu Kusch was estimated to be about 204 persons.

=== British Mandate era ===
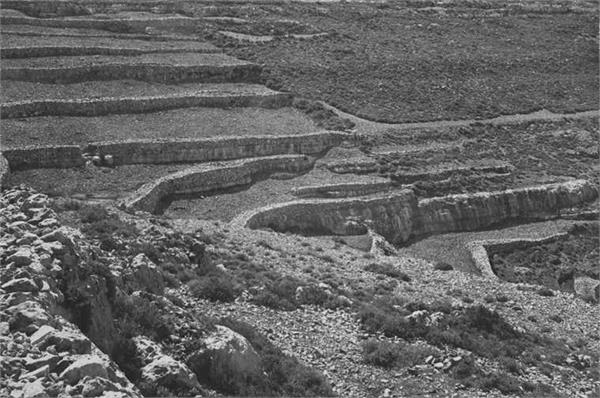
Agricultural terraces in 1942 (British Mandate)

In the 1922 census of Palestine, conducted by the British Mandate authorities, the population of Abu Qash was 171 Muslims, increasing in the 1931 census to 246 inhabitants, in 49 houses.

In the 1945 statistics Abu Qash had a population of 300 Muslims, and a total land area of 4,751 dunams. 1,166 dunams were for plantations and irrigable land, 1,447 were for cereals, while 42 dunams were built-up areas.

=== Jordanian era ===
In the wake of the 1948 Arab–Israeli War, and after the 1949 Armistice Agreements, Abu Qosh came under Jordanian rule. It was annexed by Jordan in 1950.

In 1961, the population was 510.

=== Post-1967 ===
Since the Six-Day War in 1967, Abu Qash has been under Israeli occupation.

After the 1995 Oslo II accords, 99.8% of Abu Qash land was classified as Area B land and the remaining 0.2% as Area C.

== Bibliography ==
- Barron, J.B., ed. (1923). Palestine: Report and General Abstracts of the Census of 1922. Government of Palestine.
- Conder, C.R.; Kitchener, H.H. (1882). The Survey of Western Palestine: Memoirs of the Topography, Orography, Hydrography, and Archaeology. Vol. 2. London: Committee of the Palestine Exploration Fund.
- Finkelstein, I.; Lederman, Zvi, eds. (1997). Highlands of many cultures. Tel Aviv: Institute of Archaeology of Tel Aviv University Publications Section. ISBN 965-440-007-3.
- Government of Jordan, Department of Statistics (1964). First Census of Population and Housing. Volume I: Final Tables; General Characteristics of the Population (PDF).
- Government of Palestine, Department of Statistics (1945). Village Statistics, April, 1945.
- Guérin, V. (1869). Description Géographique Historique et Archéologique de la Palestine (in French). Vol. 1: Judee, pt. 3. Paris: L'Imprimerie Nationale.
- Hadawi, S. (1970). Village Statistics of 1945: A Classification of Land and Area ownership in Palestine. Palestine Liberation Organization Research Center. Archived from the original on 2018-12-08.
- Hartmann, M. (1883). "Die Ortschaftenliste des Liwa Jerusalem in dem türkischen Staatskalender für Syrien auf das Jahr 1288 der Flucht (1871)". Zeitschrift des Deutschen Palästina-Vereins. 6: 102–149.
- Mills, E., ed. (1932). Census of Palestine 1931. Population of Villages, Towns and Administrative Areas. Jerusalem: Government of Palestine.
- Palmer, E.H. (1881). The Survey of Western Palestine: Arabic and English Name Lists Collected During the Survey by Lieutenants Conder and Kitchener, R. E. Transliterated and Explained by E.H. Palmer. Committee of the Palestine Exploration Fund.
- Robinson, E.; Smith, E. (1841). Biblical Researches in Palestine, Mount Sinai and Arabia Petraea: A Journal of Travels in the year 1838. Vol. 3. Boston: Crocker & Brewster.
- Schick, C. (1896). "Zur Einwohnerzahl des Bezirks Jerusalem". Zeitschrift des Deutschen Palästina-Vereins. 19: 120–127.
- Socin, A. (1879). "Alphabetisches Verzeichniss von Ortschaften des Paschalik Jerusalem". Zeitschrift des Deutschen Palästina-Vereins. 2: 135–163.
