= Atef Abu Saif =

Palestinian writer (born 1973)

- عاطف أبو سيف
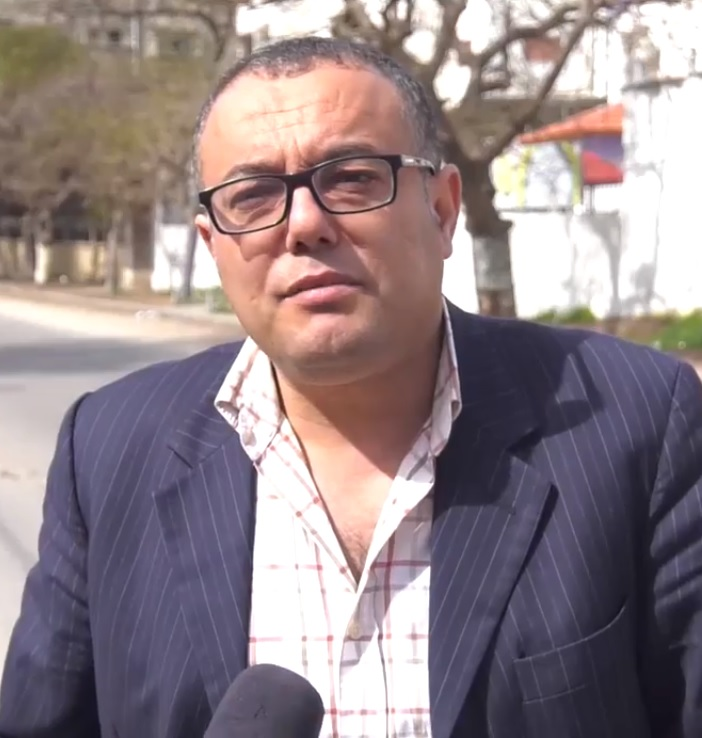

Minister for Culture
- Incumbent
- Assumed office 2019
- President: Mahmoud Abbas
- Prime Minister: Mohammad Shtayyeh
- Preceded by: Ehab Bessaiso

Personal details
- Born: 1973 (age 52–53) Jabalia refugee camp, Gaza Strip
- Education: University of Birzeit University of Bradford European University Institute
- Occupation: Writer Spokesman

Atef Abu Saif (Arabic: عاطف أبو سيف; born 1973) is a Palestinian writer. His books have been translated into various languages, and his writings have also been featured in The New York Times, The Guardian, Guernica, and Slate. He has served as a spokesman for Fatah and served as Minister for Culture in the Palestine Authority from 2019 to 2024.

== Early life and education ==
Abu Saif was born in 1973 in the Jabalia refugee camp, Gaza Strip. His family was originally from Jaffa before becoming refugees due to the 1948 Palestinian expulsion and flight. He studied at the University of Birzeit and the University of Bradford before going on to obtain a PhD from the European University Institute in Florence.

== Writing ==
Since his literary debut in the late 1990s, Abu Saif has written a number of novels and short story collections. His novel A Suspended Life (2014) was shortlisted for the 2015 Arabic Booker Prize. He published five other novels: Shadows in the memory (1997), Tale of the Harvest Night (1998), The Snow Ball (2000), The Salty Grape of Paradise (2003), and Running in Place (2019). In addition to that he published two collections of short stories: Everything is Normal and Stories from Gaza Time. Abu Saif edited as well a collection of short stories from Gaza titled The Book of Gaza, which includes as well one of his own short stories. It was published by Comma 2014.

A Suspended Life was due to be published in English in Autumn 2016 by Bloomsbury.

His account of the 2014 Gaza conflict was published in English under the title The Drone Eats with Me: Diaries from a City Under Fire, with a foreword by Noam Chomsky. Extracts from the diaries have appeared in Western publications such as Slate, Guernica, The Guardian and The New York Times. The Diaries appeared in Germany 2015 under the title Frühstück mit der Drohne, from Unionsverlag.

Abu Saif's 2019 novel Running in Place was the first novel from Gaza to be translated into Hebrew and published in Israel.

Abu Saif's diary dispatches written while visiting Gaza in 2023 during the Gaza war were published in the New York Times and Slate magazine. They were published as a collected volume, titled Don't Look Left: A Diary of Genocide, in March 2024. The diary is an eyewitness record of the first 75 days of Israel-Gaza war; 45 days in his house in the north and another 30 days in a tent after his forced move to the south of the Gaza Strip. Reviewer Helena Kennedy wrote "It is hard to describe the cumulative effect this devastating chronicle has over 280 pages. It describes a mounting toll of death and destruction.... Gradually, it makes it clear that there is no safe place in the Gaza Strip."

== Public service career ==
On 5 February 2018, Fatah's Information, Culture, and Ideology Commission commissioned him as a spokesman for Fatah. From 2019 to 2024, he has been the Minister for Culture in the Palestine Authority.

== Life events ==
In March 2019, Palestinian Authority news organization Wafa published pictures that showed Saif, bruised and bandaged, clothed in blood-stained garments and lying on a hospital bed. Wafa said that Saif had been beaten as Hamas attacked protestors and journalists; protestors were on the streets to demand better living conditions.

== Assorted works ==
- Abu Saif, Atef (2024). Don't Look Left: A Diary of Genocide. Comma Press. ISBN 9780807016848.
- Abu Saif, Atef (2016). The Drone Eats with Me: A Gaza Diary. Beacon Press. ISBN 9780807049105.
- Abu Saif, Atef (2015). Frühstück mit der Drohne: Tagebuch aus Gaza. Unionsverlag. ISBN 9783293309036.
- Abu Saif, Atef (2014). The book of Gaza : a city in short fiction. Comma Press. ISBN 9781905583645. OCLC 870426674.
- Abu Saif, Atef (2006). The impact of the EU aid on the stateness of the Palestinian entity (PhD thesis) (in German). European University Institute. OCLC 1088463214.
