= Nazlet Zeid =

- Municipality type D (Village council)

Arabic transcription(s)
  - Arabic: خربة نزلة زيد
  - Latin: Nazlat ash-Sheikh Zeid (official)
- Location of Nazlet Zeid within Palestine
- Coordinates: 32°27′45″N 35°10′30″E
- Palestine grid: 166/207
- State: State of Palestine
- Governorate: Jenin

Government
  - Type: Village council

Population (2017)
  - Total: 843

Nazlet Zeid (Arabic: خربة نزلة زيد; also known as Nazlat ash-Sheikh Zeid) is a Palestinian village in the northern West Bank, administratively part of the Jenin Governorate. The village is in Area C, putting it under full Israeli military and civilian control. The West Bank barrier runs through the village. According to the Palestinian Central Bureau of Statistics, the village had a population of 704 in the 2007 census and 843 in the 2017 census.

== History ==
=== Ottoman era ===
In the late Ottoman era, it was noted as a place named Sheik Zeid, which was presumed to come from a personal name.

=== British Mandate era ===
In the 1922 census of Palestine conducted by the British Mandate authorities, Kh. al-Sheikh Zaid had a population 10, all Muslims.

The inhabitants are mostly belong to the Al-Kilani family. The village was named after Sheikh Zeid Kilani, the late leader of the Kilani family. The village was the site of a 1935 shootout between the Arab resistance leader Izz al-Din al-Qassam and British Mandatory police, which ended with al-Qassam killed.

In the 1945 statistics the population of Nazlet Zeid was counted with that of Ya'bad, in an official land and population survey.

=== Jordanian era ===
In the wake of the 1948 Arab–Israeli War, and after the 1949 Armistice Agreements, Nazlet Zeid came under Jordanian rule.

In 1961, the population of Nazlat Zeid was 132 persons.

=== Post-1967 ===
Since the Six-Day War in 1967, Nazlet Zeid has been under Israeli occupation. The population of Nazlat Zeid in the 1967 census conducted by Israel was 271, of whom 27 originated from the Israeli territory.

== Bibliography ==
- Barron, J.B., ed. (1923). Palestine: Report and General Abstracts of the Census of 1922. Government of Palestine.
- Government of Jordan, Department of Statistics (1964). First Census of Population and Housing. Volume I: Final Tables; General Characteristics of the Population (PDF).
- Government of Palestine, Department of Statistics (1945). Village Statistics, April, 1945.
- Hadawi, S. (1970). Village Statistics of 1945: A Classification of Land and Area ownership in Palestine. Palestine Liberation Organization Research Center.
- Palmer, E.H. (1881). The Survey of Western Palestine: Arabic and English Name Lists Collected During the Survey by Lieutenants Conder and Kitchener, R. E. Transliterated and Explained by E.H. Palmer. Committee of the Palestine Exploration Fund.
