= Hasan Abdel Rahman =

Palestinian diplomat (born 1944)

Hasan Abdel Rahman (born 1944 in Surda, Ramallah, British Mandate Palestine) is a former Palestinian National Authority (PNA) ambassador to the United States of America and PNA ambassador to the Kingdom of Morocco. Nominated by the PLO Executive Committee in 1982 to serve as the PLO's representative in Washington, D.C., from 1994 through 2005, he represented the Palestinian National Authority in the American capital. Abdel Rahman is currently the executive director and general coordinator of the Arab-Latin American Forum and a senior advisor to the Global Foundation for Democracy and Development (FUNGLODE).

Abdel Rahman began his academic career at Damascus University in the early 1960s. However, his active participation in the university's Palestinian student political movement brought him to the attention of the Syrian Mukhabarat, eventually forcing him to flee Syria in 1964 for Latin America. Abdel Rahman ended up spending one year in Argentina and three years in Brazil before moving on to various Caribbean nations and eventually settling in Puerto Rico.

In 1971, Abdel Rahman graduated from the Pontifical Catholic University of Puerto Rico with a bachelor's degree in political science and sociology. One year later, he earned a master's degree in public administration from the University of Puerto Rico. In 1972, Abdel Rahman left for the United States where he was a doctoral candidate in political science from the City College of New York.

In 1974, Abdel Rahman was hired by the PLO to help prepare for Yasser Arafat's historic address to the United Nations. When on November 22, 1974, the organization received formal observer status, Abdel Rahman became its deputy representative in New York City. Just weeks prior to the announcement, Abdel Rahman was the victim of a terrorist attack in his New York City offices by three armed members of the Jewish Defense League who entered the building and beat him with pipes and bats, leaving him with permanent scars on his forehead.

In 1982, Abdel Rahman was appointed to serve as the PLO's official representative to the United States, a position he held (save for a brief two-year interlude as the organization's representative in Canada between 1991 and 1992) until the signing of the Declaration of Principles in September 1993. From 1994 to 2005, he served as chief representative of the Palestinian National Authority to the United States. As a fluent Spanish speaker, he concurrently served as the PNA's liaison to the governments of Colombia, Chile and Venezuela.

In addition to his official representative positions, Abdel Rahman was an active participant in the peace process in the Israeli–Palestinian conflict, serving as a senior political advisor to the Palestinian negotiating teams at the Madrid Conference of 1991, Wye River Conference and Camp David 2000 Summit.

During his tenure in Washington, D.C., Abdel Rahman was a frequent guest on television news programs and the college lecture circuit.
