= A Suspended Life =

2015 novel by Atef Abu Saif

- Author: Atef Abu Saif
- Language: Arabic
- Genre: Novel
- Publisher: Al-Ahleya Publishing and Distribution
- Publication date: 2015
- Pages: 407

A Suspended Life is a novel written by a Palestinian novelist Atef Abu Saif. The novel was first released in 2015 by Al-Ahliya Publishing and Distribution House in Amman. It entered the final "short" list of the 2015 World Prize for Arabic Fiction, known as the "Arab Booker Prize".

== The Novel ==
In his novel "A Suspended Life", the Palestinian novelist Atef Abu Saif tells about Naim's death, owner of the only printing press in the camp, who was shot by the Israeli occupation army. Naim, who used to print posters of Palestinian martyrs in the camp, his son refuses to have a poster printed of him, in a profound debate about the concept of heroism and controversy over participation with life or exile. But Naim's death alters many details of the peaceful life on the camp's outskirts, where the hill on which Naim built a house, the government wants to exploit the hill and build a mosque and police station. Because the hill held a special place in people's collective awareness, the residents of the camp were opposed to the project and resisted it until a clash with the police occurred. The novel reveals many details of life in Gaza, and Jaffa "the home of camp refugees" is called through time retrievals, narrative discrepancies, and overlapping anecdotes that detail an amazing world in which people interact, argue, and struggle to redefine and install the concept of identity, heroism, and life.
