= Ministry of Culture (Palestine) =

Government ministry of Palestine

- وزارة الثقافة الفلسطينية

Agency overview
- Formed: 1994
- Jurisdiction: Government of Palestine
- Headquarters: Ramallah, Palestine
- Minister responsible: Imad al-Din Hamdan, Minister of Culture
- Website: moc.pna.ps

The Ministry of Culture is a government agency responsible for promoting and supporting cultural activities and initiatives in Palestine. It was established in 1994 following the signing of the Oslo Accords, which recognized the Palestinian Authority as the governing body in the occupied territories. The current Minister of Culture of Palestine is Imad al-Din Hamdan.

The Ministry of Culture is responsible for the development and implementation of cultural policies, the preservation of Palestinian heritage and traditions, and the promotion of Palestinian arts and culture both domestically and internationally. It also supports the development of cultural infrastructure, including the construction of museums, cultural centers, and theaters.

The Ministry of Culture's work includes organizing cultural events, festivals, and exhibitions, as well as providing financial support to artists and cultural institutions. It also works to promote cultural exchange and dialogue with other countries and cultures.

== List of ministers ==
#	Name	Party	Government	Term start	Term end	Notes
Minister of Culture and Information
1	Yasser Abed Rabbo	Palestinian Democratic Union	1, 2, 3, 4, 5	5 July 1994	30 April 2003	
Minister of Culture
2	Ziad Abu Amr	Independent	6	30 April 2003	7 October 2003	
3	Nabil Shaath	Fatah	7	7 October 2003	12 November 2003	
4	Yahya Yakhlif	Fatah	8, 9	12 November 2003	29 March 2006	
5	Attallah Abul Sabeh	Independent	10	29 March 2006	17 March 2007	
6	Bassam as-Salhi	Palestinian People's Party	11	17 March 2007	14 June 2007	
7	Ibrahim Abrash	Independent	12	14 June 2007	2008	
8	Tahani Abu Daqqa	Independent	12	2008	19 May 2009	
9	Siham Barghouti	Palestinian Democratic Union	13, 14	19 May 2009	6 June 2013	
10	Anwar Abu Eisha	Independent	15, 16	9 June 2013	2 June 2014	
(2)	Ziad Abu Amr	Independent	17	2 June 2014	14 December 2015	
11	Ehab Bessaiso	Independent	17	14 December 2015	13 April 2019	
12	Atef Abu Saif	Fatah	18	13 April 2019	31 March 2024	
13	Imad al-Din Hamdan	Independent	19	31 March 2024	Incumbent	

== See also ==
- Culture of Palestine
