= Zanqufa =

Zanqufa زنقوفة Zanqufeh
- Village
- Location within Syria
- Coordinates: 35°35′58″N 36°2′35″E
- Country: Syria
- Governorate: Latakia
- District: Al-Haffah
- Subdistrict: Al-Haffah

Population (2004 census)
  - Total: 928
- Time zone: UTC+2 (EET)
  - Summer (DST): UTC+3 (EEST)

Zanqufa (Arabic: زنقوفة, also spelled Zanqoufeh) is a village in northwestern Syria, administratively part of the al-Haffah District, located northeast of Latakia. It is situated along the southern edge of city of al-Haffah. According to the Syria Central Bureau of Statistics, Zanqufa had a population of 928 in the 2004 census. Its inhabitants are Sunni Muslims.

During the 1919-20 revolt against French rule in Syria, Zanqufa was used as a base of guerrilla operations and training by rebel leader Izz ad-Din al-Qassam.

== Bibliography ==
- Balanche, Fabrice (2000). "Les Alaouites, l'espace et le pouvoir dans la région côtière syrienne : une intégration nationale ambiguë" (in French). Tours: Université François Rabelais.
- Abdullah, Schleifer (1993). "Palestinian Peasantry in the Great Revolt". In Edmund Burke (ed.). Struggle and Survival in the Modern Middle East. University of California Press. ISBN 0-520-07988-4.
