= Ehab Bessaiso =

Palestinian politician and poet

- إيهاب بسيسو
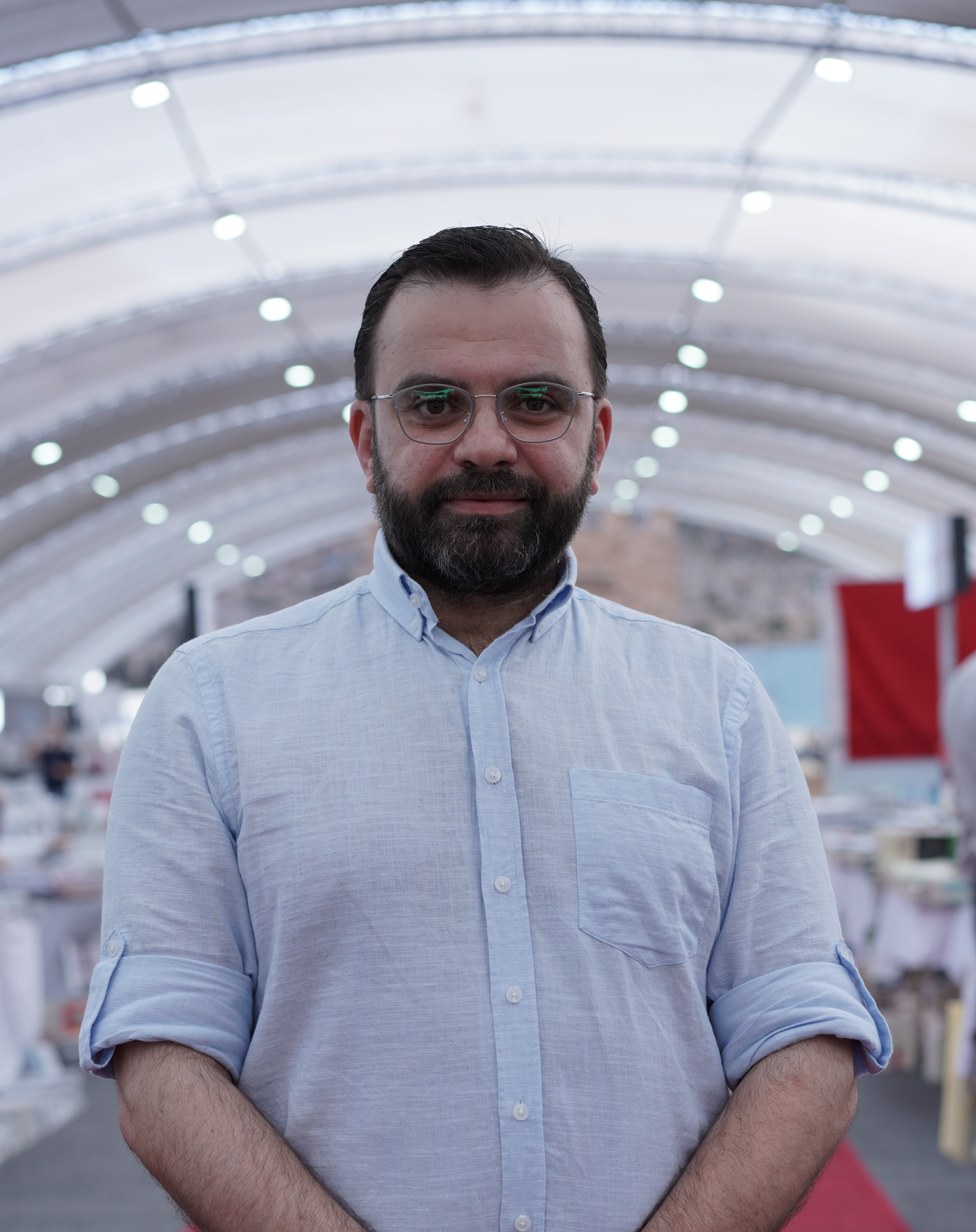
- Bessaiso in 2023

Minister of Culture
- In office 14 December 2015 – 13 April 2019
- President: Rami Hamdallah
- Preceded by: Ziad Abu Amr
- Succeeded by: Atef Abu Saif

Spokesperson for the Palestinian Authority
- In office 2 June 2014 – 14 December 2015

Chairperson of the Palestinian National Library
- In office 2019 – 27 June 2021
- Succeeded by: Isa Qaraqi

Personal details
- Born: إيهاب ياسر عارف بسيسو Gaza City, Palestine
- Party: Fatah
- Education: Birzeit University, Cardiff University
- Occupation: Poet, architect, politician, university teacher

Ehab Bessaiso (born 28 May 1978) is a Palestinian poet, architect, and politician. Bessaiso is a former spokesperson for the Palestinian Authority and served as the Minister of Culture in Palestine from 2015 to 2019.

He was born on 28 May 1978, in Gaza City. Bessaiso obtained his degree in architecture from Birzeit University and went on to pursue postgraduate studies at Cardiff University in the United Kingdom. He subsequently worked as an architect and university teacher before entering politics.

In June 2014, Bessaiso was appointed as the spokesperson for the Palestinian Authority, a position he held until December 2015 when he became the Minister of Culture.

In 2019, Bessaiso was appointed as the chairperson of the Palestinian National Library, a position he held until his dismissal in June 2021.

Bessaiso has been a member of Fatah, a Palestinian political party. In 2022, he was awarded the Order of the Star of Italy for his efforts to promote cultural exchange and understanding between Palestine and Italy.

In addition to his political career, Bessaiso is also a poet who has published collections of his work. His poetry often focuses on the experiences of Palestinians living under occupation and the struggle for freedom and justice.
