= Qadri Abu Bakr =

Palestinian politician (1953–2023)

- قدري أبو بكر

Minister of Detainees and Ex-Detainees Affairs
- In office 1 August 2018 – 1 July 2023
- Preceded by: Isa Qaraqi

Member of the Palestine National Council
- In office 2018 – 1 July 2023

Personal details
- Born: 10 January 1953 Biddya, Jordan-annexed West Bank
- Died: 1 July 2023 (aged 70) Marda, Salfit
- Party: Fatah
- Education: Bachelor's degree in political science from Beirut Arab University (1991)
- Occupation: Politician

Military service
- Rank: Major General

Qadri Abu Bakr (Arabic: قدري أبو بكر; 10 January 1953 – 1 July 2023) was a Palestinian politician and member of the Fatah political party who served as minister of Detainees and Ex-Detainees Affairs for the Palestinian Authority from 2018 until his death in 2023. He was appointed to this position in 2018, succeeding Issa Qaraqe. Prior to this, he held various positions throughout his career, including with the Palestinian Preventive Security Force from 1996 to 2008. Abu Bakr held a bachelor's degree in political science from Beirut Arab University and also held the military rank of major general. He died at the age of 70 in a traffic accident.

== Early life and education ==
Abu Bakr was born on 10 January 1953, in Biddya. He held a bachelor's degree in political science from Beirut Arab University, which he obtained in 1991.

Abu Bakr spent 17 years in prisoner after he was arrested by Israeli forces for transferring weapons to the West Bank. He was then exiled to Iraq, but returned and assumed the role of minister of Detainees and Ex-Detainees Affairs.

== Political career ==
Abu Bakr was a member of the Fatah political party and had held various positions throughout his career, including with the Palestinian Preventive Security Force from 1996 to 2008. In 2018, he became minister of Detainees and Ex-Detainees Affairs, replacing Isa Qaraqi, and also became a member of the Palestine National Council. He also held the military rank of major general. In this role, Abu Bakr oversaw the Palestinian Authority Martyrs Fund.

== Personal ==
Abu Bakr was diagnosed with COVID-19, and was affected from 13 February to 28 February 2021. He died in a traffic accident near Jamma’in on 1 July 2023, at the age of 70.
