= Surda =

- Municipality type C

Arabic transcription(s)
  - Arabic: سردا
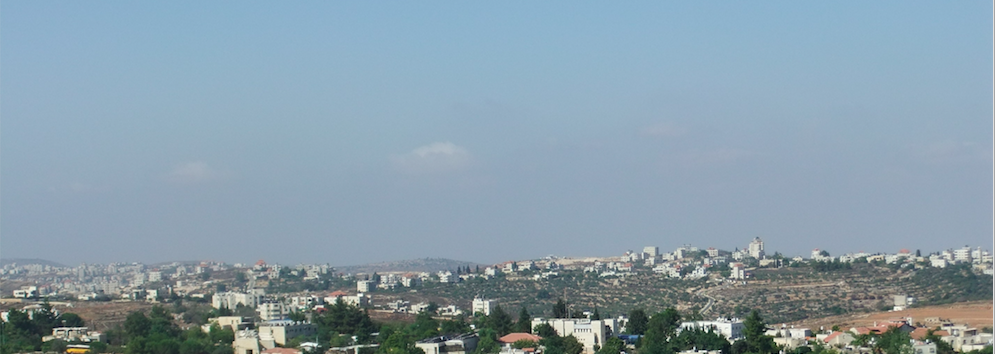
- View of Surda, 2011

- Location of Surda within Palestine
- Coordinates: 31°56′29″N 35°12′12″E
- Palestine grid: 169/150
- State: State of Palestine
- Governorate: Ramallah and al-Bireh

Government
  - Type: Municipality

Population (2017)
  - Total: 1,308
- Name meaning: possibly from a Syriac word which can be translated to mean fear and isolation, or possibly from Zerada

Surda (Arabic: سردا, romanized: Surdā) is a Palestinian town in the Ramallah and al-Bireh Governorate of the State of Palestine, located northeast of Ramallah in the northern West Bank. According to the Palestinian Central Bureau of Statistics (PCBS), the town had a population of 1,308 inhabitants in 2017.

== Location ==
Surda is located 3.7 kilometers (2.3 mi) north of Ramallah. It is bordered by Al-Bireh and Dura al-Qar' to the east, Jifna to the north, Abu Qash to the west, and Ramallah and Al Bireh to the south. Surda is 838 meters above sea level.

== History ==
Pottery sherds from the Byzantine and the Mamluk eras have been found here.

=== Ottoman era ===
In 1517, the village was included in the Ottoman Empire with the rest of Palestine, and in the 1596 tax-records it appeared as Surda, located in the Nahiya of Quds of the Liwa of Al-Quds. The population was 10 households, all Muslim. They paid a fixed tax rate of 33,3% on agricultural products, such as wheat, barley, olive trees, vineyards, goats and beehives, in addition to occasional revenues; a total of 1,660 akçe. Pottery sherds from the early Ottoman era have also been fond here.

In 1838, it was noted as the village Surada, in the Beni Harith district.

An Ottoman village list of about 1870 indicated 13 houses and a population of 63, though the population count included men, only.

In 1882, the PEF's Survey of Western Palestine (SWP) described Surdah as: "A small village on a hillside, with a garden to the south of it, and the spring 'Ain Jelazun on the east."

In 1896 the population of Surda was estimated to be about 108 persons.

=== British Mandate era ===
In the 1922 census of Palestine, conducted by the British Mandate authorities, Surda had a population of 125 Muslims, increasing in the 1931 census to 179 Muslims, in 43 houses.

In the 1945 statistics the population of Surda was 250 Muslims, while the total land area was 3,726 dunams, according to an official land and population survey. Of this, 1,002 dunums were used for plantations and irrigable land, 1,244 for cereals, while 20 dunams were classified as built-up areas.

=== Jordanian era ===
In the wake of the 1948 Arab–Israeli War, and after the 1949 Armistice Agreements, Surda came under Jordanian rule.

The Jordanian census of 1961 found 415 inhabitants in Surda.

=== 1967-present ===
After the Six-Day War in 1967, Surda has been under Israeli occupation.

After the 1995 accords, 95.4% of village land has been defined as Area B land, while the remaining 4.6% is Area C.

Surda is the birthplace of the Palestinian diplomat Hasan Abdel Rahman.

== Bibliography ==
- Barron, J.B., ed. (1923). Palestine: Report and General Abstracts of the Census of 1922. Government of Palestine.
- Conder, C.R.; Kitchener, H.H. (1882). The Survey of Western Palestine: Memoirs of the Topography, Orography, Hydrography, and Archaeology. Vol. 2. London: Committee of the Palestine Exploration Fund.
- Finkelstein, I.; Lederman, Zvi, eds. (1997). Highlands of many cultures. Vol. 1. Tel Aviv: Institute of Archaeology of Tel Aviv University Publications Section. ISBN 965-440-007-3.
- Government of Jordan, Department of Statistics (1964). First Census of Population and Housing. Volume I: Final Tables; General Characteristics of the Population (PDF).
- Government of Palestine, Department of Statistics (1945). Village Statistics, April, 1945.
- Hadawi, S. (1970). Village Statistics of 1945: A Classification of Land and Area ownership in Palestine. Palestine Liberation Organization Research Center.
- Hartmann, M. (1883). "Die Ortschaftenliste des Liwa Jerusalem in dem türkischen Staatskalender für Syrien auf das Jahr 1288 der Flucht (1871)". Zeitschrift des Deutschen Palästina-Vereins. 6: 102–149.
- Hütteroth, W.-D.; Abdulfattah, K. (1977). Historical Geography of Palestine, Transjordan and Southern Syria in the Late 16th Century. Erlanger Geographische Arbeiten, Sonderband 5. Erlangen, Germany: Vorstand der Fränkischen Geographischen Gesellschaft. ISBN 3-920405-41-2.
- Mills, E., ed. (1932). Census of Palestine 1931. Population of Villages, Towns and Administrative Areas. Jerusalem: Government of Palestine.
- Palmer, E.H. (1881). The Survey of Western Palestine: Arabic and English Name Lists Collected During the Survey by Lieutenants Conder and Kitchener, R. E. Transliterated and Explained by E.H. Palmer. Committee of the Palestine Exploration Fund.
- Robinson, E.; Smith, E. (1841). Biblical Researches in Palestine, Mount Sinai and Arabia Petraea: A Journal of Travels in the year 1838. Vol. 3. Boston: Crocker & Brewster.
- Schick, C. (1896). "Zur Einwohnerzahl des Bezirks Jerusalem". Zeitschrift des Deutschen Palästina-Vereins. 19: 120–127.
- Socin, A. (1879). "Alphabetisches Verzeichniss von Ortschaften des Paschalik Jerusalem". Zeitschrift des Deutschen Palästina-Vereins. 2: 135–163.
