= Al-Jarina Mosque =

Partially destroyed mosque in Haifa, Israel

- مسجد الجرينة
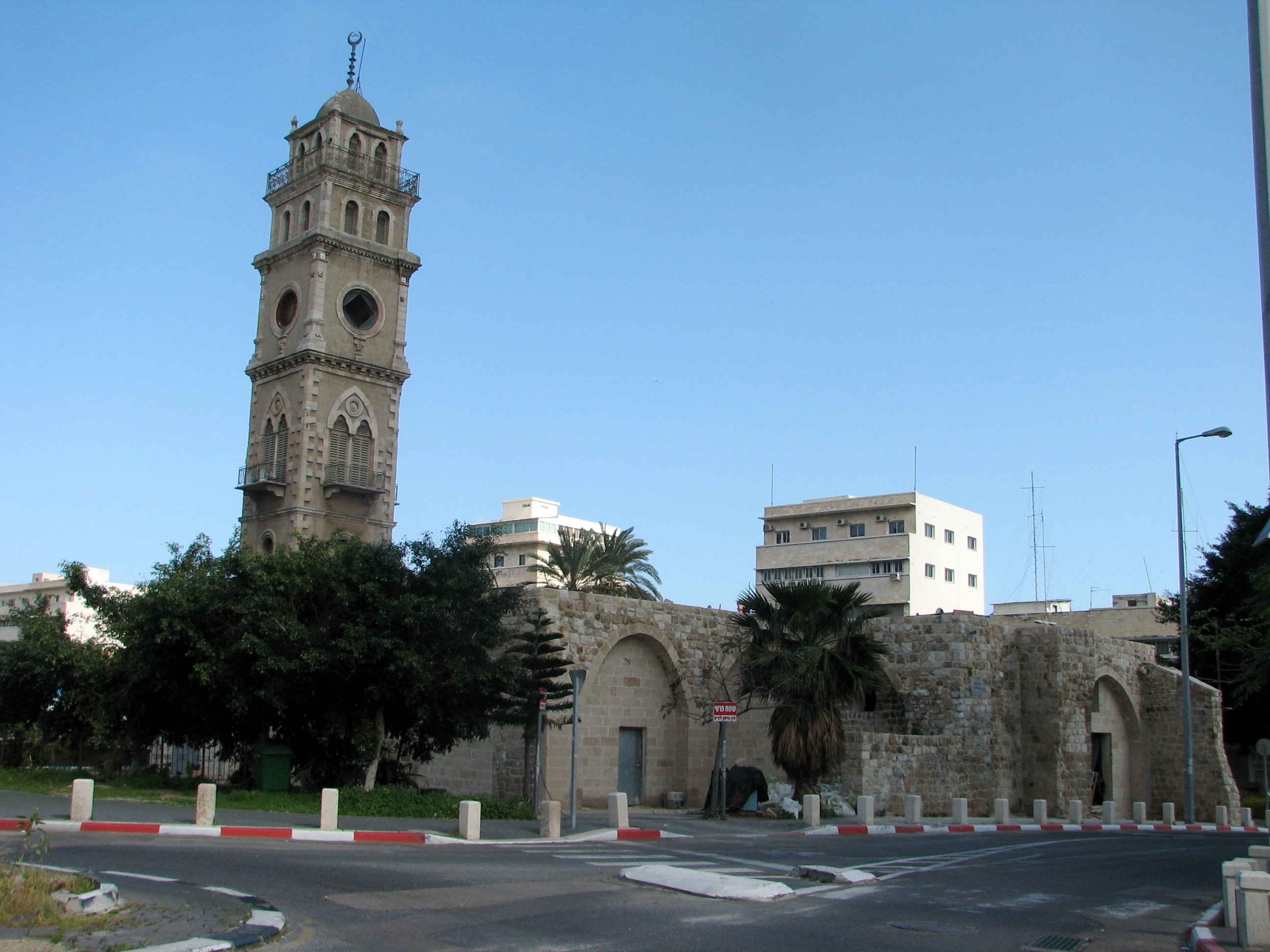
- The mosque clock tower in 2011

- Location of the former mosque in Haifa

Religion
- Affiliation: Islam (former)
- Ecclesiastical or organizational status: Mosque (1775–2025)
- Status: Inactive; (partially destroyed)

Location
- Location: NNatanzon Street, Haifa
- Country: Israel
- Interactive map of Al-Jarina Mosque
- Coordinates: 32°48′55″N 35°0′24″E

Architecture
- Type: Mosque architecture
- Style: Ottoman
- Completed: 1775 CE
- Destroyed: June 20, 2025 (in the Twelve-Day War)
- Minaret: One: destroyed: (1948)

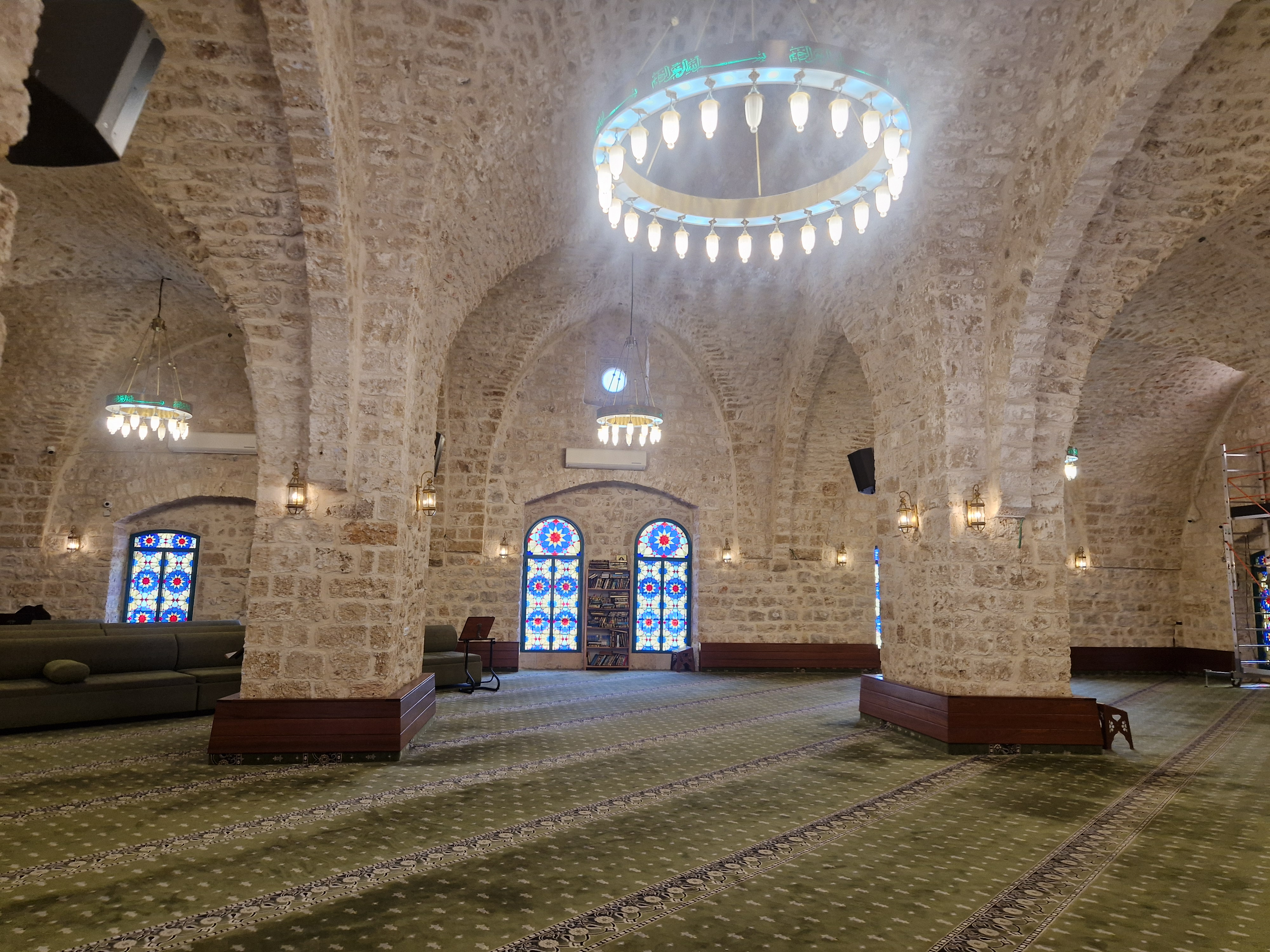
The interior of the mosque in 2025, prior to its partial destruction

The Al-Jarina Mosque or Al-Jerina Mosque (Arabic: مسجد الجرينة, romanized: Masjid al-Jarina, lit. 'Threshing Floor Mosque'; Hebrew: מסגד אל-ג'רינה), also known as the Great Mosque of Haifa (Arabic: مسجد حيفا الكبير, romanized: Masjid Haifa al-Kabir), was the main mosque of Haifa, Israel.

Built in 1775 CE, during the Ottoman rule of the Levant, the mosque was originally named al-Nasr Mosque (Arabic: مسجد النصر, lit. 'Victory Mosque'), in honor of Admiral Hassan Pasha al-Jazairli's victory over local ruler Daher al-Omar in August 1775. The name "Al-Jarina" was given due to its proximity to the open market square known as Jarina. The mosque was located in downtown Haifa on Natanzon Street (formerly al-Umayya Street), near the Sail Tower within Haifa's Governmental Center.

The mosque was struck by an Iranian missile during the Twelve-Day War while Muslim clerics were gathering inside on June 20, 2025; and injured worshippers and clerics. As of July 2025, the mosque was closed for worship.

== Structure ==
The mosque consisted of several buildings surrounding a large paved square sahn. On the northern side lies the main rectangular prayer hall, oriented east–west, with the mihrab facing east. Until 1948, the mosque featured a small minaret from which the muezzin would call to prayer; this minaret was destroyed.

During both the Ottoman period and the British Mandate era, the plaza in front of the mosque served as a commercial and civic center for Haifa's Arab Muslim residents, with numerous shops surrounding it. Between the mosque and Hamra Square to its west ran the Market Street, Haifa's main street at the time.

In 1958, renovations were carried out at the mosque at a cost exceeding 25,000 Israeli lira. A dedication ceremony marking the completion of these renovations was held on April 21, 1958. In 1964, Haifa Municipality planned to turn part of the mosque complex into a cultural center, housing a library and community club alongside its religious functions. Further renovations and restoration, funded by the Al-Aqsa Foundation, were completed in 2011.

The mosque's minaret, destroyed in the late 1940s, was slated for reconstruction after Israel's Interior Ministry allocated funds for its restoration in June 2024.

=== Clock tower ===
At the end of the 19th century, a clock tower was constructed on the mosque's southern side, made of kurkar (calcareous sandstone). The tower was erected by order of Sultan Abdul Hamid II, as part of an empire-wide project to build clock towers in several cities to commemorate the 25th anniversary of his reign; seven such towers were built across Ottoman Palestine. Haifa's tower was commissioned by the city's fourth mayor, Mustafa Pasha al-Khalil.

The tower is square-shaped, rising six stories high, topped by a concrete dome and a crescent-bearing pole. An iron balcony surrounds the top floor. Round windows were installed on all four sides of the second and fourth stories, with clocks originally placed in the fourth-floor windows. Today, only the southern clock face remains, with its iron Latin numerals still visible. Originally, the clock faces bore Arabic numerals.

The main entrance pathway to the mosque's courtyard passes through the tower's ground floor. Above the entrance is an inscription commemorating the 25th year of Sultan Abdul Hamid II's reign, bearing the year 1316 AH (1898/9 CE). Interestingly, this suggests the Haifa clock tower may have been built earlier than most of the other Ottoman towers, which were generally erected around 1901.

A 1905 photograph shows a Star of David motif within one of the second-floor round windows, a feature that has since been removed.

On May 3, 2004, the Israel Postal Company issued a stamp series titled "Ottoman Clock Towers in Israel," including a 1.30 NIS stamp depicting the Haifa clock tower.

== Gallery ==
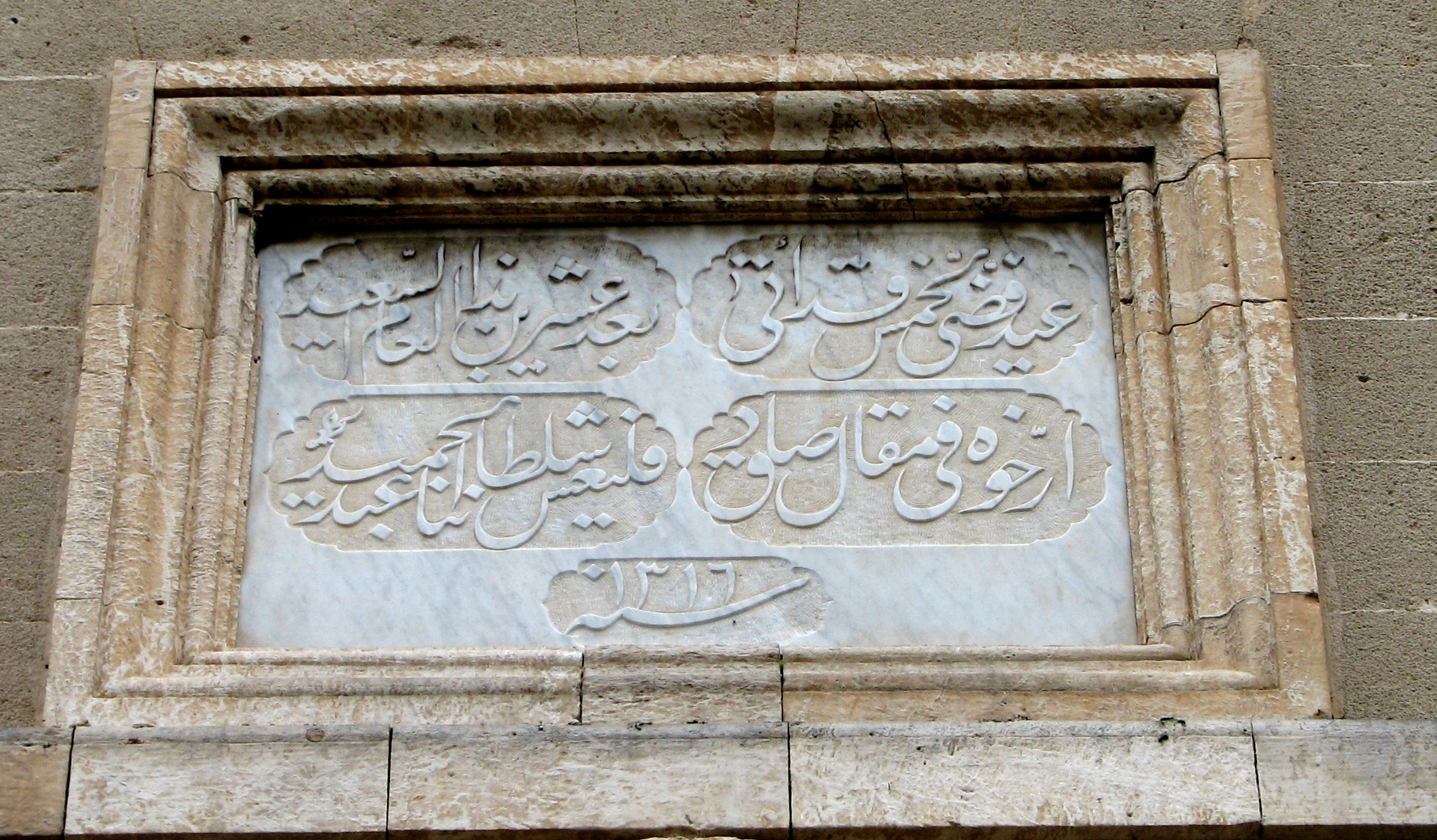
Inscription above entrance

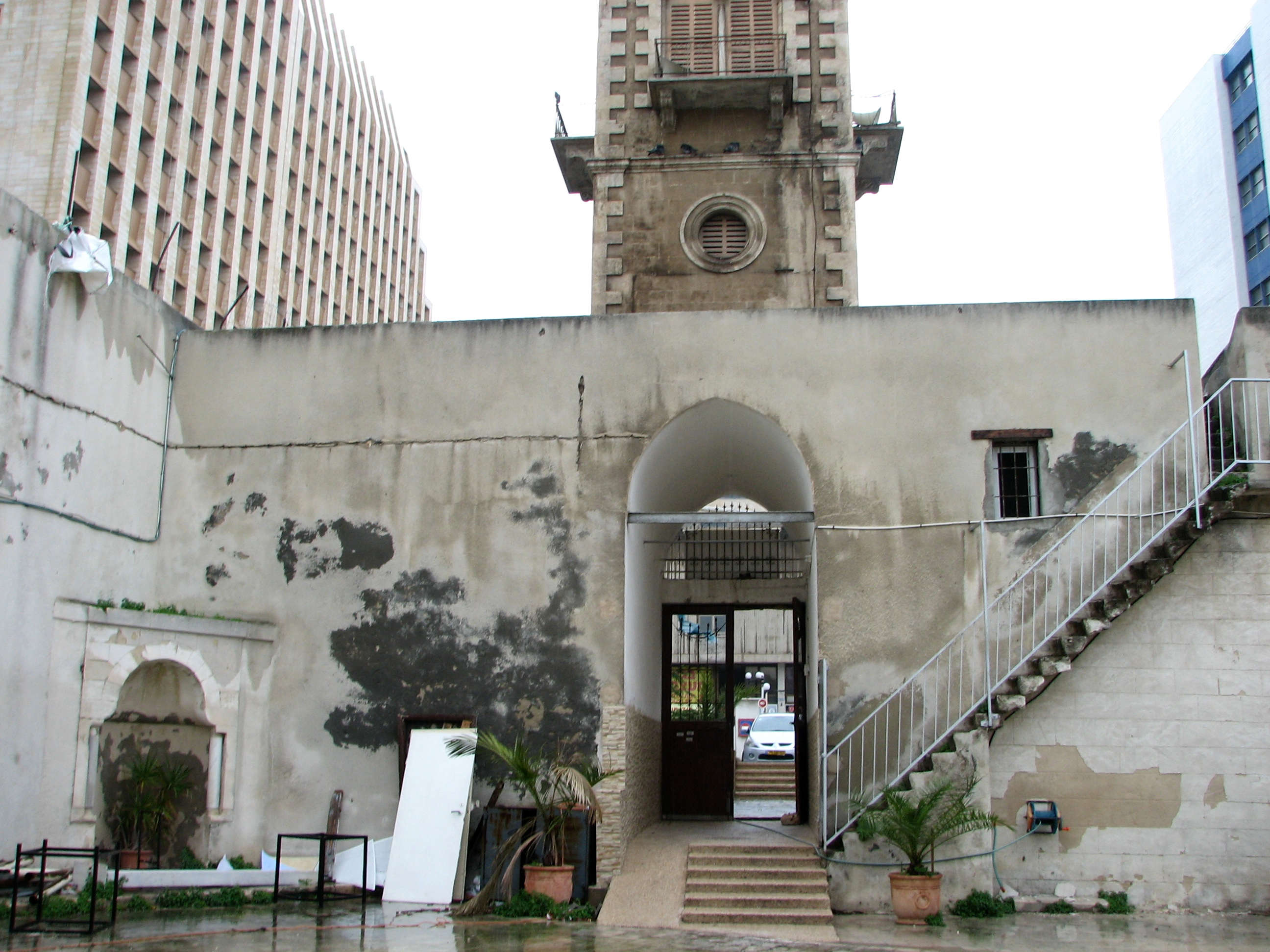
Main gate as seen from inside courtyard facing south; stairs to clock tower on the right

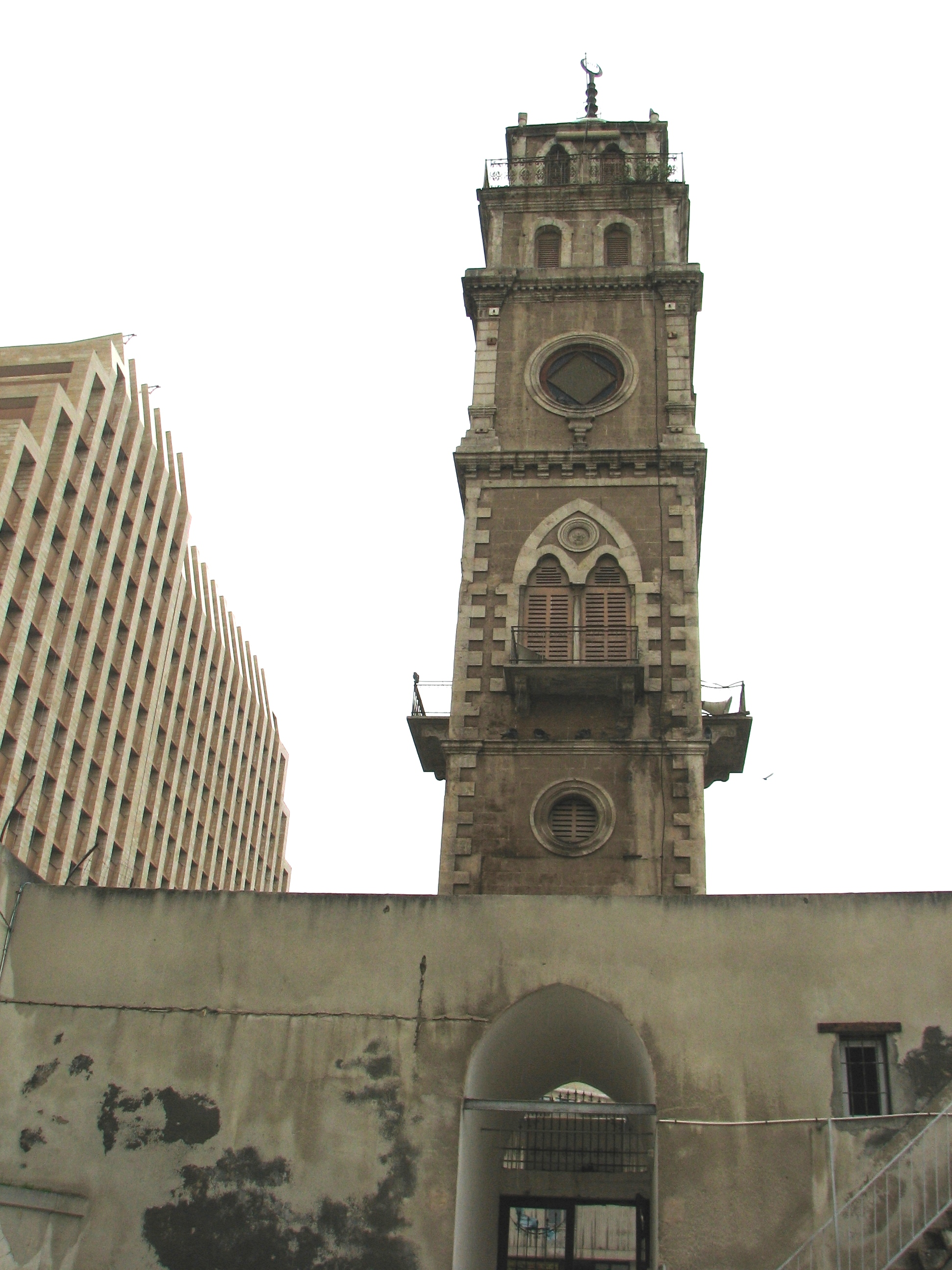
Northern side of the tower

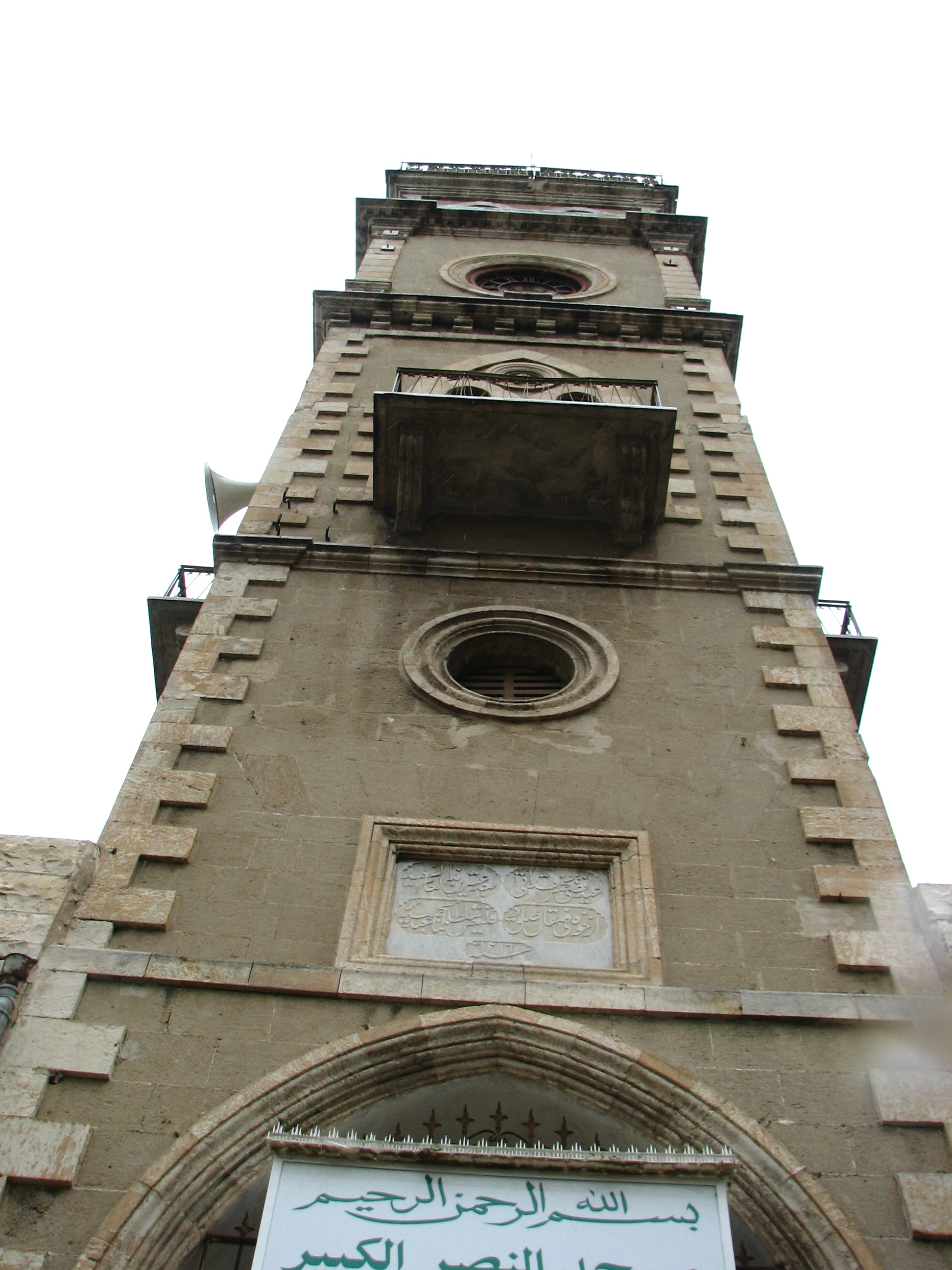
Southern side of the tower, viewed from below

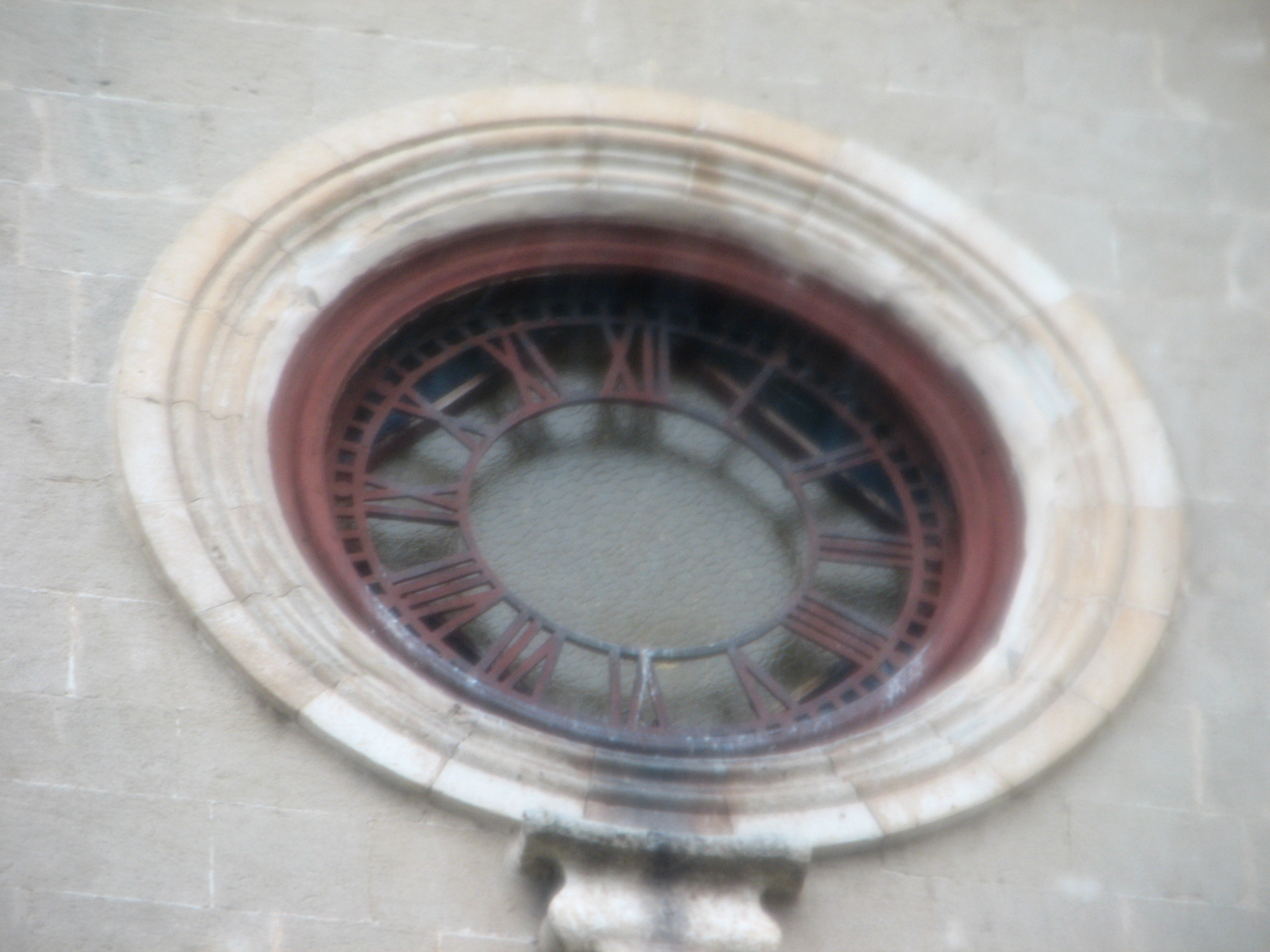
Metal numerals on southern clock face

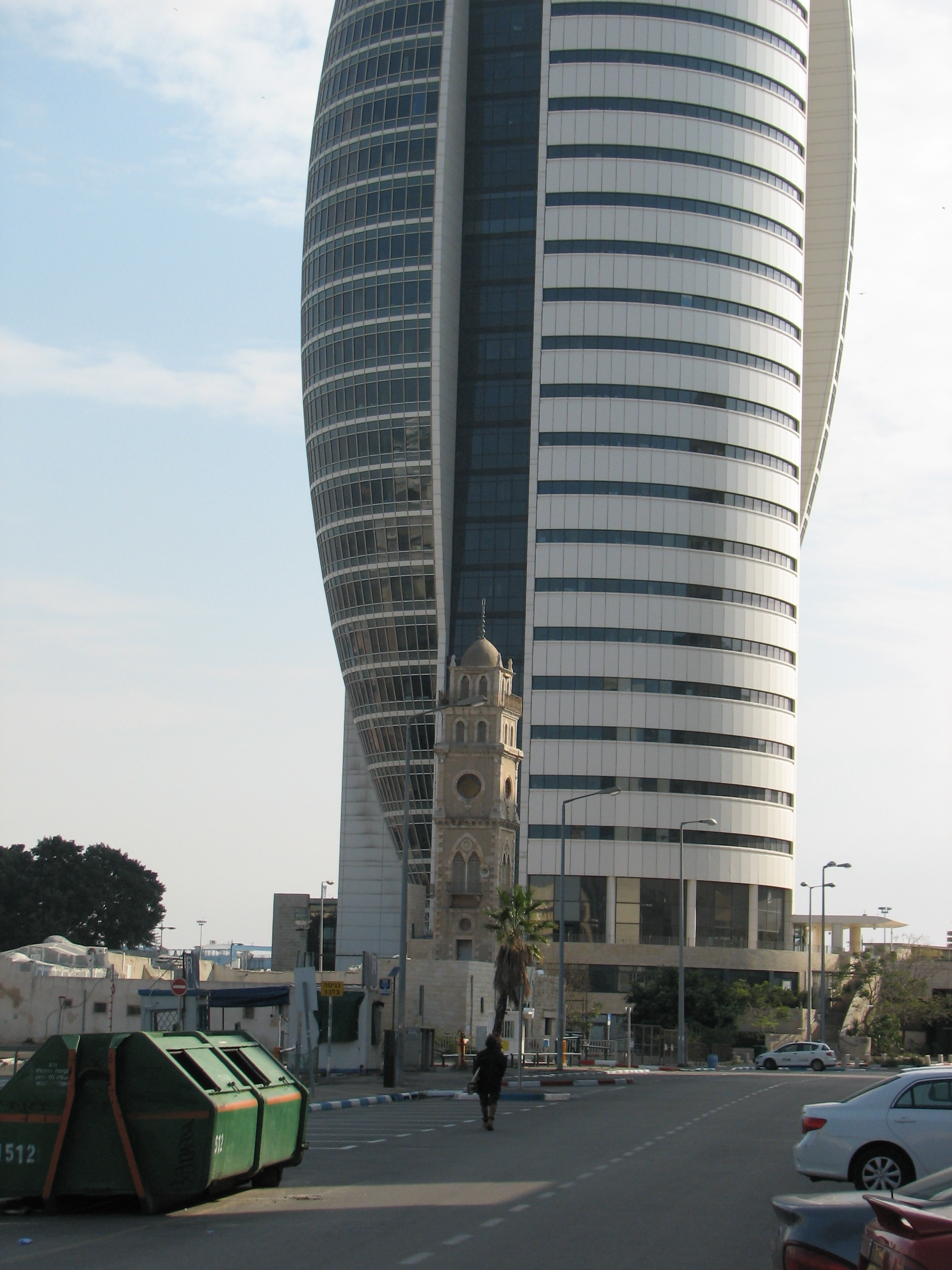
The mosque alongside the nearby Sail Tower

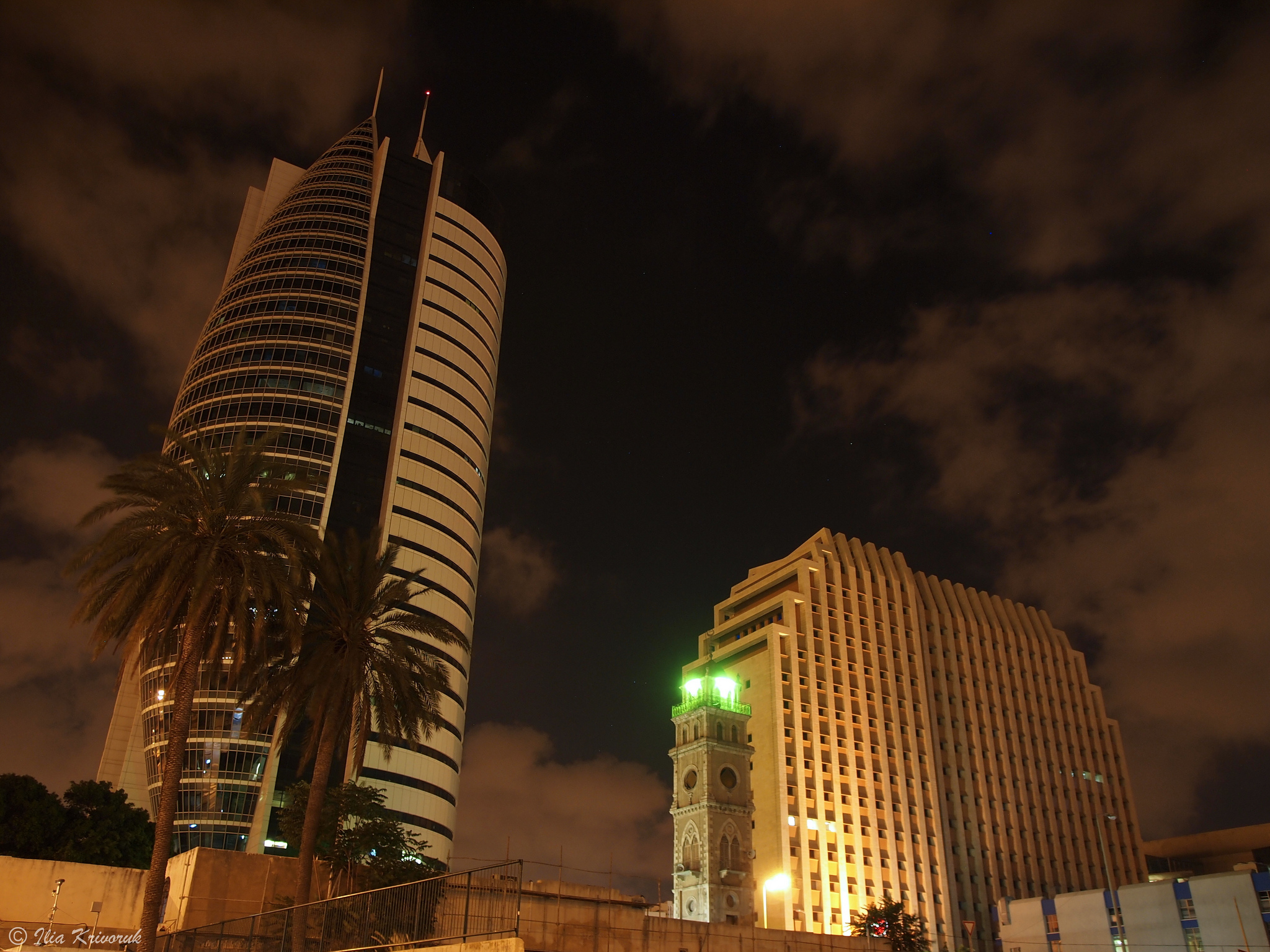
The mosque at night, with surrounding government buildings

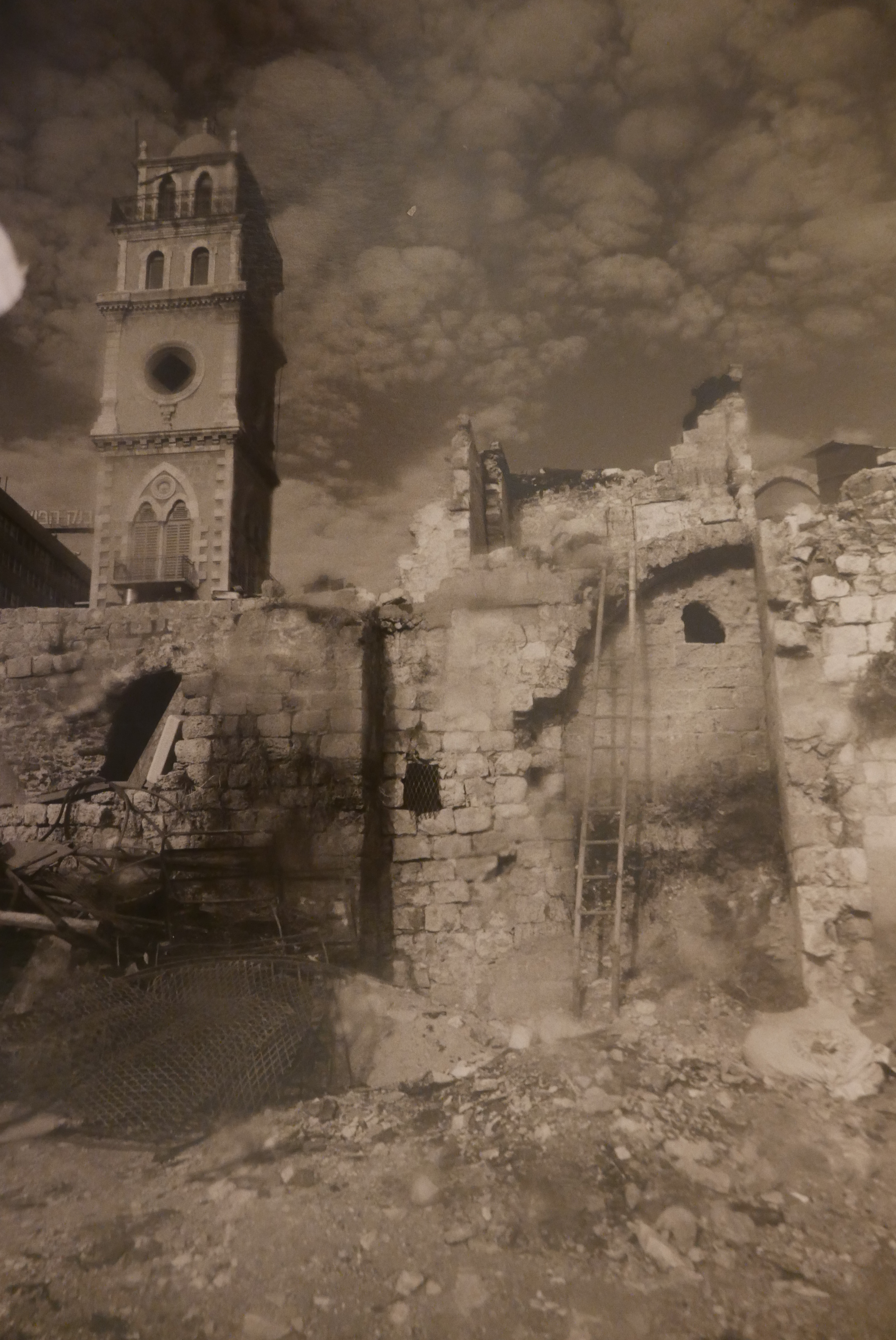
The mosque prior to fence renovations

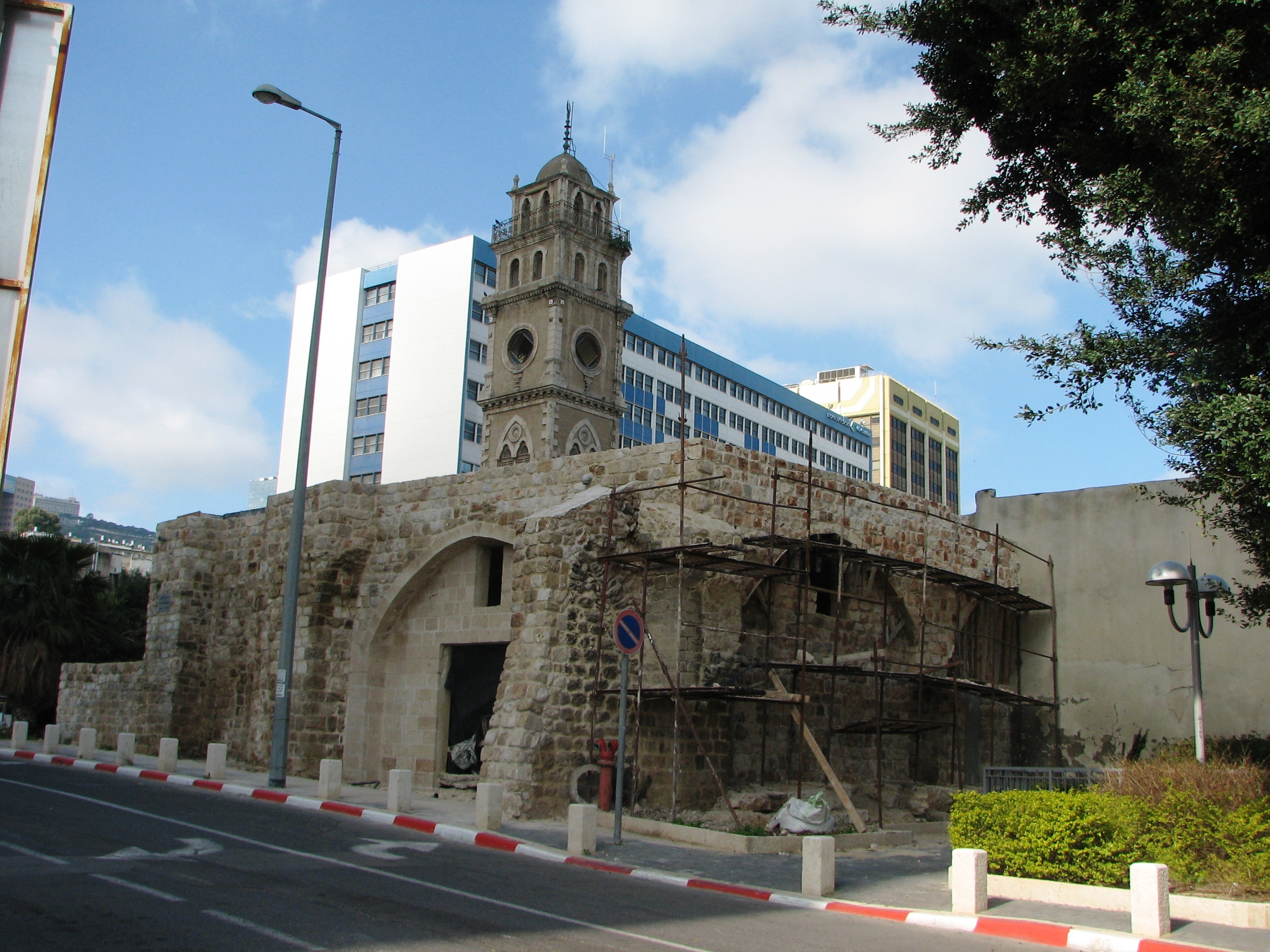
The mosque during renovations, in 2011

== See also ==
- Islam in Israel
- List of mosques in Israel
