= Ashraf al-Ajrami =

Palestinian politician

- أشرف العجرمي
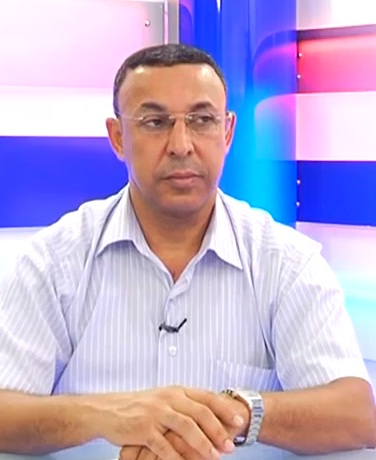
- Ashraf al-Ajrami in 2012

Minister of Prisoners' Affairs
- In office 1994–2002
- President: Yasser Arafat
- Preceded by: office established
- Succeeded by: Hisham Abdel Razek

Member of the Fatah Central Committee
- Incumbent
- Assumed office 2009

Personal details
- Born: 1961 (age 64–65) Jabalia Camp, Gaza Strip
- Party: Democratic Front for the Liberation of Palestine; Fatah
- Education: Birzeit University
- Occupation: Politician

Ashraf al-Ajrami (born 1961) is a Palestinian politician. He is a member of two political parties, the Democratic Front for the Liberation of Palestine and Fatah.

== Life ==
Al-Ajrami was born in 1961 in the Jabalia Camp in the Gaza Strip. In the 1980s, he became a member of the Democratic Front for the Liberation of Palestine. In 1994, he was appointed as the Minister of Prisoners' Affairs in the Palestinian Authority, a position he held until 2002.

After leaving his position as Minister of Prisoners' Affairs, al-Ajrami continued to be active in Palestinian politics. In 2005, he joined the Fatah party, which is the largest political party in the Palestinian Authority. He has been a member of the Fatah Central Committee since 2009.
