= Ziad Abu Amr =

Palestinian politician and writer (born 1950)

- زياد أبو عمرو
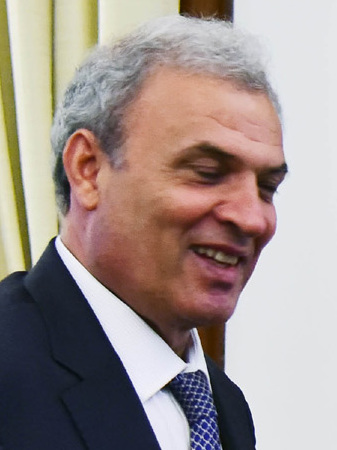
- Abu Amr in 2017

Deputy Prime Minister of Palestine
- In office 6 June 2013 – 31 March 2024 Serving with Mohammad Mustafa (2013–2015) and Nabil Abu Rudeineh (2018–2024)
- President: Mahmoud Abbas
- Prime Minister: Rami Hamdallah; Mohammad Shtayyeh
- Preceded by: Azzam al-Ahmad (2007)
- Succeeded by: Vacant

Minister of Culture
- In office 2 June 2014 – 14 December 2015
- Prime Minister: Rami Hamdallah
- Preceded by: Anwar Abu Eisha
- Succeeded by: Ehab Bessaiso
- In office 30 April 2003 – 7 October 2003
- Prime Minister: Mahmoud Abbas
- Preceded by: Yasser Abed Rabbo
- Succeeded by: Nabil Shaath

Minister of Foreign Affairs
- In office 17 March 2007 – 14 June 2007
- Prime Minister: Ismail Haniyeh
- Preceded by: Mahmoud al-Zahar
- Succeeded by: Salam Fayyad

Member of the PLO Executive Committee
- Incumbent
- Assumed office May 2018

Member of the Palestinian Legislative Council for Gaza Governorate
- Incumbent
- Assumed office 7 March 1996

Personal details
- Born: 22 June 1950 (age 76) Gaza City, All-Palestine Protectorate
- Party: Independent
- Education: Damascus University (BA); Georgetown University (MA, PhD)

Ziad Abu Amr (Arabic: زياد أبو عمرو; born 22 June 1950) is a Palestinian politician, author, and member of the Palestinian Legislative Council. He served as Deputy Prime Minister of Palestine and is a member (independent) of the PLO Executive Committee. From 17 March 2007 to 14 June 2007, he was Minister of Foreign Affairs. On 6 June 2013, Ziad Abu Amr was appointed as Deputy Prime Minister of Palestine by President Mahmoud Abbas.

== Background ==
Born in Gaza City on 22 June 1950, Abu Amr attended Damascus University in Syria, where he earned a bachelor's degree in English literature and language in 1973. He studied at Georgetown University in Washington, D.C., receiving a master's degree in Arab studies from the Center for Contemporary Arab Studies in 1979 and a PhD in Philosophy and Comparative Politics in 1985. After working as a teacher in Bahrain, Oman, and Syria in the 1970s, he taught political science at Birzeit University in Ramallah from 1985 to 1993.

Abu Amr is a US citizen.

== Political career ==
Running as an independent candidate in the 1996 Palestinian general election, he won a seat in the Palestinian Legislative Council (PLC) representing Gaza City. During this period, he was chairman of the PLC's political committee.

He was re-elected in legislative elections that took place on 25 January 2006, winning 55,748 votes.

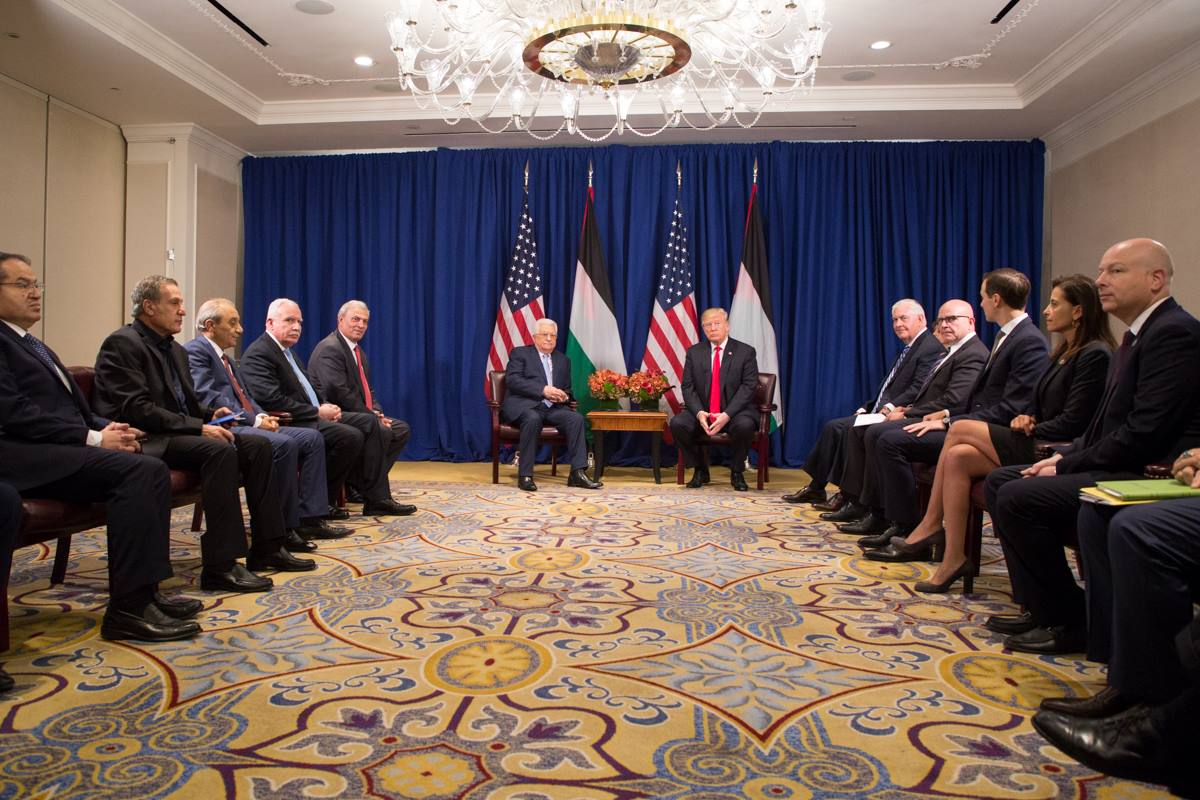
Ziad Abu Amr (first on the left of President Mahmoud Abbas) with President Donald J. Trump and President Mahmoud Abbas of the Palestinian Authority at the United Nations General Assembly, 20 September 2017.

From April to October 2003, he was Minister of Culture in the government of Prime Minister (now President) Mahmoud Abbas.

After a period of factional violence in the Palestinian territories in early 2007, the Hamas-led government resigned on 15 February. Prime Minister Ismail Haniyeh formed a new national unity government with Abu Amr as foreign minister. The cabinet was approved by the PLC and its members took office on 18 March.

On 6 June 2013, Ziad Abu Amr was appointed as Deputy Prime Minister of Palestine by President Mahmoud Abbas.

He is associated with many political associations, including the Palestine Center in Washington D.C., the Palestinian Council on Foreign Relations, the Palestinian Academic Society for the Study of International Affairs (PASSIA), and MIFTAH, a Palestinian civil rights organization.

== Political ideology and views ==
Abu Amr is considered a reform-minded politician and part of the "young guard" of Palestinian leaders. He has, at times, been critical of the Palestinian Authority administration and security services. He has mediated talks between the two main Palestinian factions, Hamas and Fatah, and is widely respected by both groups.

A proponent of democracy and democratic elections, he has been a supporter of representation for opposition groups such as Hamas and Islamic Jihad, claiming that they would be held more accountable for their actions.

In 2025, Middle East Eye reported Abu Amr was key to proposing a plan to use the PA security forces to fight for PA control of the Gaza Strip.

== Miscellaneous ==
Abu Amr is married and the father of five children. Currently, he lives in Ramallah, West Bank. He has published several books, the most well-known being Islamic Fundamentalism in the West Bank and Gaza: Muslim Brotherhood and Islamic Jihad.

== See also ==
- Palestinian National Unity Government of March 2007
- Palestinian Authority Governments of 2013
- Palestinian Unity Government of June 2014

Political offices
Preceded by Yasser Abed Rabbo	Minister of Culture; 2003	Succeeded by Nabil Shaath
Preceded by Mahmoud al-Zahar	Minister of Foreign Affairs; 2007	Succeeded by Salam Fayyad
Vacant Title last held by Azzam al-Ahmad	Deputy Prime Minister of Palestine; 2013–2024; Served alongside: Mohammad Mustafa (2013–2015) and Nabil Abu Rudeineh (2018–2024)	Vacant
Preceded by Anwar Abu Eisha	Minister of Culture; 2014–2015	Succeeded by Ehab Bessaiso
