= Ministry of Detainees and Ex-Detainees Affairs =

Government ministry of Palestine

- وزارة شؤون الأسرى والمحررين الفلسطينيين

Agency overview
- Formed: 1998
- Headquarters: Ramallah, Palestine
- Minister responsible: Qadura Fares, Minister of Detainees and Ex-Detainees Affairs

The Ministry of Detainees and Ex-Detainees Affairs is a government agency responsible for the welfare and well-being of Palestinian prisoners in Israeli jails and their families. It was established in 1998 as part of the Palestinian Authority under the Oslo Accords.

The ministry works to provide legal, social, and financial support to Palestinian prisoners and their families. This includes visiting prisoners, providing financial assistance to families of prisoners, and advocating for the rights of prisoners and their families in international forums.

The ministry also works to document cases of torture, abuse, and other human rights violations committed against Palestinian prisoners by Israeli authorities. It aims to raise awareness of the issue of Palestinian prisoners and to hold Israel accountable for its violations of international law.
