= Mazen Sinokrot =

Palestinian businessman (born 1954)

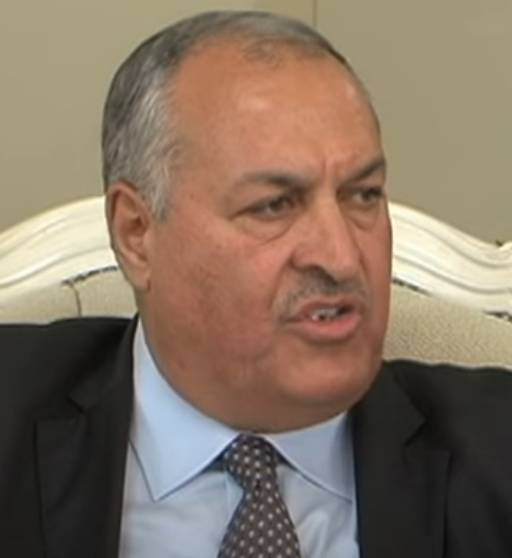
- Sinokrot in 2012

Minister of National Economy
- In office 24 February 2005 – 29 March 2006
- Prime Minister: Ahmed Qurei
- Preceded by: Maher al-Masri
- Succeeded by: Alaeddin al-Araj

Personal details
- Born: Mazen Tawfiq Sinokrot; 30 November 1954 (age 71) East Jerusalem, Jordanian-administered West Bank, Palestine
- Party: Independent
- Education: The University of Nottingham, United Kingdom
- Occupation: Businessman
- Website: http://sinokrot.com/

Mazen Sinokrot (Arabic: مازن سنقرط; born 30 November 1954) is a Palestinian businessman who founded Sinokrot Global Group established in 1982.

== Family and early life ==
Mazen was born in East Jerusalem on 30 November 1954. In 1980, Sinokrot received a BSC in Industrial Engineering and Production Management with honors from The University of Nottingham in the United Kingdom.

== Business career ==
Sinokrot is the founder of Sinokrot Holding, the leading family owned business in Palestine with regard to investment size and number of employees. SGG focuses its investments in Food and Agro-Industries, Agriculture, Tourism and Hospitality, Trade and Consumable products, and Information Technology.

He led the national effort to establish a number of private sector institutions including the Federation of Industries which he chaired for a full term. He was the founder and first chairman of the Palestine Trade Center (Paltrade), and continues to serve on the boards of a number of these institutions. He also serves on the boards of foundations that promote youth development, public participation and social responsibility, he is the chairman of the EFE, a member of the board of trustees of Al-Quds University, a member of the board of Al-Quds chamber of commerce and industry. Sinokrot serves on the board of directors of the Palestine Investment Fund and has along with the PIF and other Jerusalem entities and leading individuals, who like him are residents of Jerusalem, established the first holding company, Al-Quds Holding, to serve the area. He is also the chairman of the Palestine British Business Council.

== Political role ==
Sinokrot, who is politically independent and non-partisan, served and held the post of Minister of National Economy between 2005 and 2006. He is a frequent participant and speaker at a number of local, regional, and international conferences seeking to promote national Palestinian interests and economic development. He is a major promoter of the Public/Private partnership in formulating laws and legislations leading to a competitive economy.

Political offices
Preceded by Maher al-Masri	Minister of National Economy; 2005–2006	Succeeded by Alaeddin al-Araj
