= Sinokrot =

Palestinian holding company

Sinokrot Holding is the largest family-owned business group in Palestine, established in 1982. It is based in Ramallah, operating in 20,000 m^{2} of buildings with 350 employees. The company sells from more than 4,000 outlets. The chairman, Mazen Sinokrot, who was a Minister of National Economy until March 2006, as well as Chairman of the Board for the Palestine Standards Institute, Palestine Investment and Promotion Agency, and Palestine Industrial Zones and Free Zones Authority.

== History ==
The Sinokrot family has worked in food products since 1982, when the company began manufacturing candies, chocolate, and other confectioneries in its first Ramallah factory. Sinokrot has also established the following ventures:

- Sinokrot Cold chain company
- Sinokrot Global For Markets Development Company
- ZADONA Agro-Industrial Co.
- Pal Gardens Agriculture Company
- Sinokrot For Markets Development Company - Jerusalem
- Capital Gate Consulting Services Company

== Export ==
Sinokrot holding has expanded their businesses of medjoul dates (Pal Gardens Agriculture Company) to the european markets. Building relationships with big European Dates distributors such as Dadelskopen.
