= Mai al-Kaila =

Palestinian politician (born 1955)

- مي الكيلة
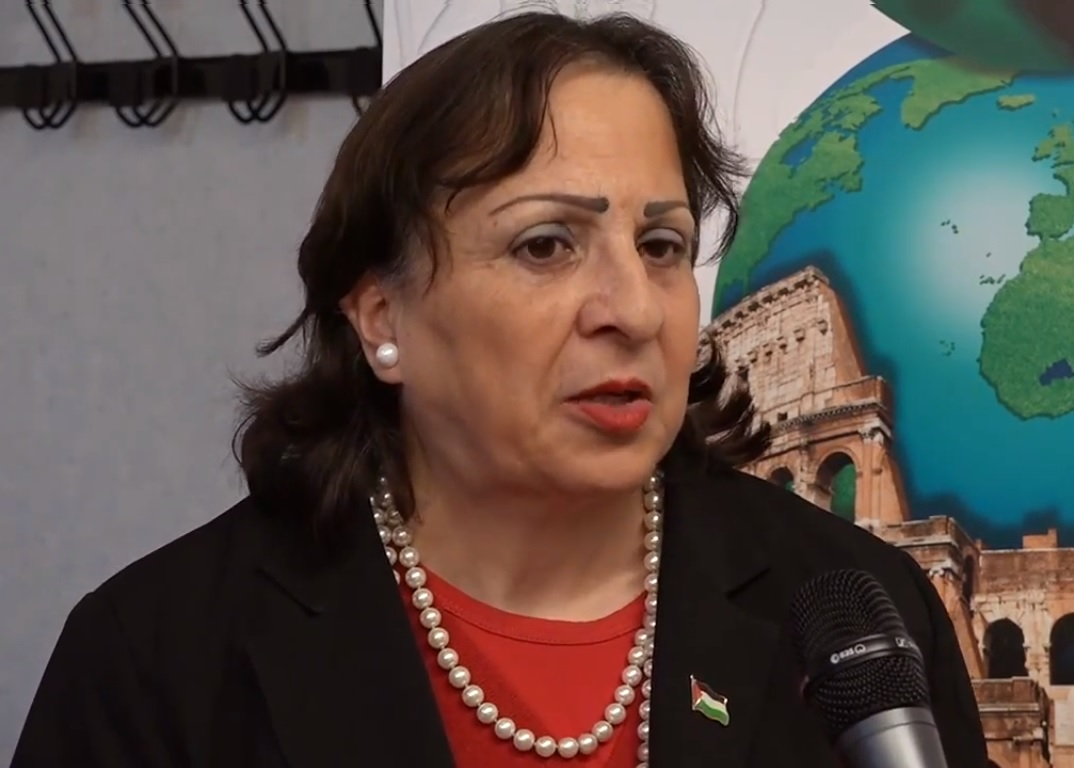

Minister of Health
- In office 13 April 2019 – 31 March 2024
- Prime Minister: Mohammad Shtayyeh
- Preceded by: Jawad Awad
- Succeeded by: Maged Abu Ramadan

Palestinian Ambassador to Italy
- In office 1 October 2013 – 2019
- Preceded by: Sabri Attia
- Succeeded by: Abeer Odeh

Palestinian Ambassador to Chile
- In office 2006–2013
- Preceded by: Sabri Attia
- Succeeded by: Imad Nabil Jadaa

Personal details
- Born: Mai Salem Hanna al-Kaila; 8 April 1955 (age 71) East Jerusalem, Jordanian-administered West Bank, Palestine
- Party: Fatah

Mai Salem Hanna al-Kaila (Arabic: مي سالم حنا الكيلة, romanized: Mayy Sālim Ḥannā al-Kaila; born 8 April 1955) is a Palestinian physician, diplomat and politician, and the first woman to hold the position of Minister of Health. She holds a PhD in public health and health administration. She chaired the Palestinian Medical Council in her capacity as health minister. She is also part of the Palestinian Authority headed by current prime minister Dr. Mohammad Mustafa.

== Background ==
Mai al-Kaila was born in East Jerusalem on 8 April 1955. She received her basic and preparatory education in the schools of Birzeit, and her secondary education at the Private College in Ramallah. She studied nursing at the Augusta Victoria Hospital in Jerusalem. She studied medicine at the University of Granada in Spain and obtained a bachelor's degree from it, then she specialized in the field of obstetrics and gynecology in the University of California, San Francisco in the United States of America and obtained a master's degree. She obtained her PhD in Public Health and Epidemiology from the University of Chile.

== Career ==
Al-Kaila worked as a resident physician at the Palestine Red Crescent Hospital in Jerusalem in the Obstetrics and Gynecology program. Mai Al-Kaila has promoted jobs and positions, as she worked as a lecturer at Al-Quds University in the Public Health Department, and at UNRWA as head of the Motherhood and Childhood Program.

In 1994, Mai al-Kaila was appointed to the Palestinian delegation to participate in the World Conference on Women, 1995 in Beijing, China.

Al-Kaila was appointed as the Ambassador of the State of Palestine to Chile on 31 October 2005. She continued to serve in that role until her appointment as Ambassador of the State of Palestine to Italy on 1 October 2013. On 4 December 2016, she won the Palestinian Revolutionary Council elections, which were held during the seventh conference of Fatah, and became a member in it.

On 13 April 2019, al-Kaila took the constitutional oath before Palestinian President Mahmoud Abbas as Minister of Health within Mohammad Shtayyeh's government, serving in that position until 31 March 2024.

== Honors ==
- In 2017, Mai al-Kaila was awarded a gold medal by the Norman Academy in cooperation with the Italian Air Force; this is due to her activism and defense of Palestinian human rights.

== See also ==
- Ministry of Health
