= Maged Abu Ramadan =

Palestinian ophthalmologist (born 1955)

- ماجد أبو رمضان

Minister of Health
- Incumbent
- Assumed office 31 March 2024
- Prime Minister: Mohammad Mustafa
- Preceded by: Mai al-Kaila

Mayor of Gaza City
- In office 2005–2008

Personal details
- Born: Māged ʻAwnī Muḥammad Abū Ramaḍān; 23 November 1955 (age 70) Gaza City, All-Palestine Protectorate
- Party: Independent
- Relatives: ʻAwnī Muḥammad Abū Ramaḍān, Mohammed Abu Ramadan, Hanāʼ Abu Ramadan, Ayed Abu Ramadan

Maged Awni Muhammad Abu Ramadan (Arabic: ماجد عوني محمد أبو رمضان, romanized: Mājid Abū Ramaḍān; 23 November 1955) is a Palestinian ophthalmologist who has served as the Minister of Health of Palestine since 31 March 2024. He was the mayor of Gaza City between 2005 and 2008.

== Early and personal life ==
Maged Awni Muhammad Abu Ramadan was born on 23 November 1955 in Gaza City.

His father, Awni Abu Ramadan, was a teacher and businessman in Gaza, a member of the Palestinian Legislative Council (Gaza Strip) elected in 1962, and a member of the Gaza Municipal Council.

His brother, Mohammed Abu Ramadan, served as Minister of State for Planning Affairs in the third Salam Fayyad government, and the First and Second Hamdallah Governments between 2012 and 2014, and is currently chairman of the Board of Directors of the Water Sector Regulatory Council.

His sister, Hana Abu Ramadan, serves as the Consul General of the State of Palestine in Istanbul.

In January 2023, his brother, Ayed Abu Ramadan, was elected Chairman of the Gaza Chamber of Commerce and Industry.

== Education and career ==
Abu Ramadan graduated from the Faculty of Medicine, Ain Shams University in 1980, where he studied Bachelor of Medicine, Bachelor of Surgery. He became a Fellow of the Royal College of Surgeons of Edinburgh and a Fellow of the Royal College of Ophthalmologists of the United Kingdom in 1990.

Abu Ramadan worked as a physician at Al-Shifa Medical Complex between 1981 and 1987, and as an ophthalmologist at Lincoln County Hospital in the United Kingdom between 1987 and 1991.

He began working for the Ministry of Health in 1992 and continued until 2007. He headed the Palestinian Ophthalmological Society in 1997.

=== Mayor of Gaza City ===
He served as mayor of Gaza between 2005 and 2008 and was also president of the Association of Palestinian Local Authorities (APLA) from 2006 to 2012.

He was also elected chairman of the board of directors of the Coastal Municipalities Water Utility (CMWU) in Gaza Strip.

He is a member of the board of directors of Saint John Eye Hospital Group in Jerusalem.

On 4 August 2018, he was appointed a member of the Board of Trustees of Al-Azhar University – Gaza and later elected chair of the International Relations and Media Committee within the council.

He stayed in the Gaza Strip for about 70 days during the Gaza war.

=== Minister of Health ===
On 28 March 2024, President Abbas approved the ministerial formation of the 19th Palestinian government headed by Muhammad Mustafa and granted it confidence. On 31 March 2024, Abu Ramadan took the legal oath remotely as Minister of Health.

== Honours ==
=== Foreign honours ===
UK: Order of St John, Knight of the Order of St John. January 2018.
