= Vera Baboun =

Palestinian politician (born 1964)

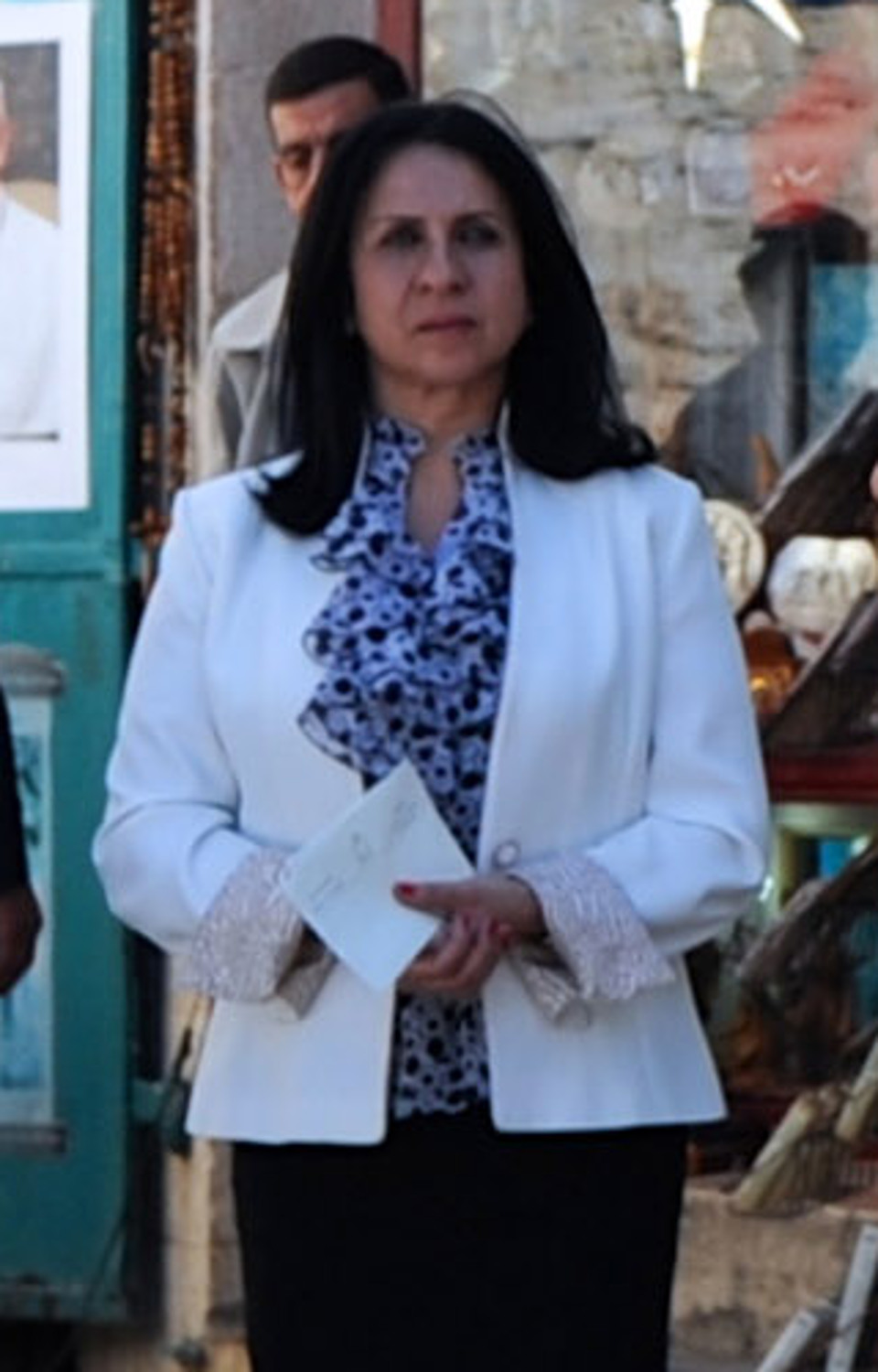

Palestinian Ambassador to Chile
- Incumbent
- Assumed office 8 December 2022
- Preceded by: Imad Al Jada

Mayor of Bethlehem
- In office October 2012 – 27 May 2017
- Preceded by: Victor Batarseh
- Succeeded by: Anton Salman

Personal details
- Born: Vera George Ghattas Baboun; 6 October 1964 (age 62) Bethlehem, Jordanian-administered West Bank, Palestine (present-day Bethlehem, Palestine)
- Party: Independent
- Spouse: Hanna (Johnny) Baboun (passed away 25 April 2007)
- Children: 5
- Education: Bethlehem University; Hebrew University of Jerusalem

Vera George Ghattas Baboun (Arabic: فيرا جورج غطاس بابون, born 6 October 1964) is a Palestinian politician who served as the first female mayor of Bethlehem. Baboun has a master's degree in African-American literature. Prior to her election, she became the principal of the Roman Catholic High School in Beit Sahour (2010-2012) and was an English literature lecturer at Bethlehem University, (1990-2010) where she was also the Assistant Dean of Students (2000-2006). Additionally, she is the chairperson of the Board of Directors for Guidance and Training Centre for Family and Children as well as a gender studies researcher in GRACE (Gender Research in Africa and the Middle East into ICTs for Empowerment) network looking at the role of information technology in empowering women in the Arab world. Baboun is the mother of five children. She is a Palestinian Christian.

== Political career ==
=== 2012 October: Bethlehem Mayoral Elections ===
Baboun led the Independence and Development bloc, made up of 12 Muslims and Christians in the Fatah movement campaigning to improve services and promote the tourism potential of Bethlehem. Her bloc was described generally as professionals and technocrats by Al-Ghad. Few expected Baboun to win. She ran against well-known male candidates as well as individuals supported by Islamists and left-wing Palestinians. By 12 Oct 2012, Fatah was leading polling by AWRAD research centre at 49%. Her bloc won the election on 20 Oct 2012 and Baboun was officially chosen as mayor in a closed session of the Bethlehem Municipal Council by the nine council members of her bloc who were popularly elected. Her opponents got six seats on the council.

=== Mayor of Bethlehem ===
As mayor, Baboun presided over a city with the highest unemployment in the West Bank. Bethlehem has a changing demographic, due to an outflux of the Christian population. She cited the presence of the Israeli West Bank barrier as an obstacle to growth by restricting the movement of people, ideas and goods. Of Bethlehem she stated, "We are a strangulated city, with no room for expansion due to the settlements and the wall." She hoped to stop the flow of emigration by creating job opportunities for young people. She also hoped to regain international support lost while Hamas was in power. Baboun terminated her post on 27 April 2017. She did not participate in the local elections that took place in Bethlehem and all the West Bank in May 2017.

=== Palestinian Ambassador to Chile ===
On 8 December 2022, she was appointed as the Ambassador of Palestine to Chile.

== Writings ==
=== Books and Papers ===
- 2016: Pour l'amour de Bethléem, Ma Ville Emmurée, published by Bayard Editions.Paris
- 2014: Women and ICT in Africa and The Middle East; Changing Selves, Changing Societies. The book includes 27 gender researches by woman researchers from the MENA area in GRACE research network. My research entitled: Scheherazades of Today: Young Palestinian women use film, radio and social networking platforms to speak up and change, published by Zedbooks.UK
- 2012: "Edward Said: A Mentor Who Mastered Speaking Truth to Power" article published by This Week in Palestine

== Awards ==
- 14 May 2017: Received 'le Prix littéraire de l'Œuvre d'Orient on' Pour l'amour de Bethléem, Ma ville emmurée published by Bayard Paris, France.
- 15 November 2016: The Issam M Fares Award for Exellence from the Middle East Institute in Washington DC, USA.
- Award presentation for Vera Baboun and Speech
- 17 June 2016: The "Premio Internazionale Giovanni Paolo II, XII Edition Salerno-Italy for defending and promoting the sacredness of life, in harmony with the Christian principles. Italy.
- 14 July 2016: Conferred the Honorary Freeman of the Town of Quatre Bornes, Mauritius.
- 29 May 2016: The Recognition A Star from the Rainbow - "10 JUST FOR THE WORLD" from "Comunità Villa San Francesco" Facen di Pedavena (BL)/ Italy.
- 12 March 2016: The Chiara Lubich Award for peace leadership and its values. the Focolare Movement in Italy Mundo Nuevo Association, Italy.
- 10 December 2015: The Cross with Crown "PRO MERITO MELITENSI" OF THE SOVEREIGN ORDER OF MALTA by His most eminent highness the prince and grand master and the sovereign of the order.
- 3 December 2015: A Certificate of Appointment as Publicity Ambassador of HWPL by Manhee Lee for the efforts of peace making
- 13 May 2015: The Medal of High Uniqueness of the City of Paris (La médaille Grand Vermeil) by mayor Anne Hidalgo from the council of the city of Paris, France.
- 19 December 2014: The title and the insignia of the Star of the Knights of Italy (Ordine della Stella d'Italia della Presidenza della Repubblica) Italy.
- 19 July 2014: the Pompeo Sarnelli in recognition of the role in serving the city of Bethlehem, and supporting its youth by the Cultural Association "Mons. Pompeo Sarnelli, Bisceglie", Italy.

== Main Conferences (2015–2017) ==
- 7 June 2017: New Cities Summit - Speaker in the 1st plenary panel entitled Understanding Urban Wellbeing, and the last plenary panel entitled Healthy Placemaking. Songdo, South Korea
- 4 February 2017: Speaker at the United Nations Roundtable on the Question of Palestine. Managua, Nicaragua
- 1 October 2016: Created and administered the 1st Bethlehem District Diaspora Convention which was held in Bethlehem, Palestine
- 17 November 2016: National Democratic Institute - a discussion with Vera Baboun, Mayor of Bethlehem, on "Leading for Inclusion and Security: The View from Bethlehem," moderated by BBC News Correspondent Jane O'Brien. Washington, USA
- 19 October 2016: 2 World Assembly of Local and Regional Governments provided formal input to the New Urban Agenda (NUA) to be adopted at Habitat III, taking place in Quito, Ecuador. Signed on the statement of the world assembly of Local and regional governments to habitat III
- October 2016: Participant at the NDI's Woman Mayors' Network (WoMN) delegation to the 5th UCLG Congress of Local and Regional Leaders in Bogota, Colombia and the UN HABITAT III Conference in Quito, Ecuador
- 16 July 2016: Speaker in Port-Luis and Quatre Bornes MainHalls. Mauritius
- April 2016: A speaker in The Atlanta Summit of Churches in the USA and the Holy Land entitled 'Pursuing Peace and Strengthening Presence" Atlanta, USA
- 4 December 2015: Climate Summit for Local Leaders in Paris, France
- 7 September 2015: Speaker at the G7 Forum for Dialogue with Women headed by Prime Minister Angela Merkel. Berlin, Germany.
- 26 June 2015: Member of the presidential delegation to the signing ceremony of The Bilateral Agreement between the Holy See and the State of Palestine, Vatican.
- April 2015: Headed the International Conference for the Historical Cities in the Mediterranean in Chefshawen, Morocco
- 4 April 2015: Speaker in Middle East Institute, "Grass-Roots Governing in Bethlehem" Washington, USA.
- 13 March 2015: Speaker at the First Women Mayors' Summit in Avcilar, Turkey.
- 10 October 2014: Speaker at the Forum of Mediterranean Cities in Naples, Italy.

Political offices
Preceded by Victor Batarseh	Mayor of Bethlehem; 2012–2017	Succeeded by Anton Salman
Diplomatic posts
Preceded by Imad Al Jada	Palestinian Ambassador to Chile; 2024–present	Incumbent
