= Nabil Amr =

Former information minister in the Palestinian National Authority (born 1947)

- نبيل عمرو

Information Minister of the Palestinian National Authority
- In office April 2003 – October 2003

Personal details
- Born: 1947 (age 78–79)
- Profession: politician

Nabil Amr (Arabic: نبيل عمرو; born 1947) is a former information minister (2003) in the Palestinian National Authority, and previous ambassador to the USSR and Egypt. He was an outspoken, fierce, longtime critic of Yasser Arafat, including regarding Arafat's wrecking the peace talks and his failure to make a counter-offer at the 2000 Camp David Summit.

Amr spearheaded calls for anti-corruption democratic reforms to the Palestinian Authority that Yasir Arafat was reluctant to make. Amr complained often about corruption and cronyism in Arafat's administration.

In September 2002, after Amr called for reform of the Palestinian Authority, Arafat had the chief of his special forces fire a number of warning shots at Amr's home.

In July 2004 Amr was shot twice in his right leg, through the window of his house in Ramallah by allegedly pro-Arafat gunmen, enraging his clan, which denounced the PA for failing to find the attackers. His shooting took place minutes after he returned to his home from a television interview on a popular political talk show, in which he criticised Arafat’s performance as president. Amr said the attack on him was intended to stifle him from calling for reforms in the Palestinian Authority. Arafat claimed that the assassins were Israeli undercover agents from Mista'arvim unit. Due to injuries from the shooting, Amr's right leg was amputated from the knee down.

He later lived in his hometown of Dura, southwest of Hebron.

== Early life and education ==
Nabil Amr was born on 6 September 1947 in the city of Dura, near Hebron. He studied at Damascus University and received a bachelor's degree in law. He also received an honorary doctorate from the International Academy of Informatics.

== Career ==
Nabil Amr worked as an official in Palestinian organizations in Syria between 1969 and 1971. Between 1973 and 1988 he was the general manager of the Voice of Palestine radio stations, which were affiliated with the Palestine Liberation Organization. He was appointed the organization's representative in the former Soviet Union in 1988, and later served as ambassador there until 1993.

In 1995, he founded the newspaper Al-Hayat al-Jadida. In the 1996 elections, he was elected to the Palestinian Legislative Council, receiving 23,269 votes in the Hebron Governorate district on behalf of the Fatah movement.

He was given the portfolio of Minister of Parliamentary Affairs in Yasser Arafat's third government in 1998, and later resigned due to his criticism of the Palestinian government and corruption in the government machinery. In 2003, in the government of Mahmoud Abbas, he was appointed Minister of Information.

Among his roles, Nabil was a member of the negotiating committee in 2005, an advisor to Yasser Arafat and then to Abu Mazen, and the Palestinian Authority's ambassador to Egypt until 2009. As part of his role as an advisor to Abu Mazen, he promoted the Fatah–Hamas Mecca Agreement to establish a Palestinian unity government.

Nabil Amar has written numerous political and intellectual articles, and has authored two books.

== Bibliography ==
- أيام الحب والحصار (Days of Love and Siege) - deals with the establishment of Palestinian Radio during the siege of Beirut in 1982. ASIN B0DM1FT34P
- ألف يوم في موسكو (A Thousand Days in Moscow) - deals with the Soviet Union's Middle East policy, the collapse of the superpower, and the Gulf War.
