= Ooredoo Palestine =

Palestinian mobile network operator

- Industry: Telecommunications
- Founded: November 2009
- Headquarters: Al-Bireh, Palestine
- Area served: Palestine
- Key people: Durgham Maraee (CEO); Mohammed Abu Ramadan (Chairman)
- Products: GSM, GPRS, EDGE, SMS, MMS, UMTS, HSDPA, HSPA+
- Revenue: 101,600,000 United States dollar (2020)
- Net income: 7,500,000 United States dollar (2020)
- Parent: Ooredoo
- Website: www.ooredoo.ps

Ooredoo Palestine (formerly Wataniya Mobile Palestine Telecommunication Company or Wataniya Mobile for short) is one of the two mobile network operators in the West Bank (the other being Jawwal), founded in November 2009. It describes itself as a member of the Ooredoo Group, and it is 48.45% owned by Ooredoo, 34.03% by the Palestine Investment Fund, and 17.52% by others (freely traded). The chairman is Mohammed Abu Ramadan, who was formerly Palestinian Minister of State for Planning, and the CEO is Durgham Maraee. Ooredoo had 610,000 subscribers by the end of 2012, a 28% market share, and was the third largest company on the Palestine Exchange by market capitalization, representing 13.8% of the Al-Quds Index.

In 2017, Ooredoo began services in the Gaza Strip. In 2023, the network in the Gaza strip was damaged by the Israeli bombing of the Gaza Strip.

Wataniya Palestine began as a mobile network, of which the majority owner was Qtel (now Ooredoo).
