= List of ambassadors of Palestine to Chile =

Coordinates: 33.414782°S 70.569479°W

Ambassador of Palestine to Chile
- Incumbent; Vera Baboun since 2022
- Inaugural holder: Hussein Abdelkhaliq
- Formation: 1992

The Palestinian ambassador in Santiago de Chile is the official representative of the Palestinian government to the Government of Chile.

== List of representatives ==
| | ambassador | Diplomatic agrément/Diplomatic accreditation | Term end | President of Palestine | President of Chile | Observations |
|---|---|---|---|---|---|---|
| 1 | Grace Al-Atrash | 1990 | 1992 | Yasser Arafat | | |
| 2 | Hussein Abdelkhaliq | 1992 | 2000 | Yasser Arafat | Patricio Aylwin Azócar | |
| 3 | Sabri Ateyeh | 2000 | 2005 | Yasser Arafat | Ricardo Lagos Escobar | |
| 4 | Mai al-Kaila | 2006 | 2013 | Mahmoud Abbas | Michelle Bachelet | |
| 5 | Imad Nabil Jadaa | 2013 | 2022 | Mahmoud Abbas | Sebastián Piñera | From 1979 to 1988 he was head of the mission in Havana.; From 2006 to 2008 he was ambassador in Caracas.; From 2008 to 2013 he was ambassador in Bogotá. |
| 6 | Vera Baboun | 2022 | until now | Mahmoud Abbas | Gabriel Boric | |
