= Ministry of National Economy (Palestine) =

Government ministry of Palestine

- وزارة الاقتصاد الوطني
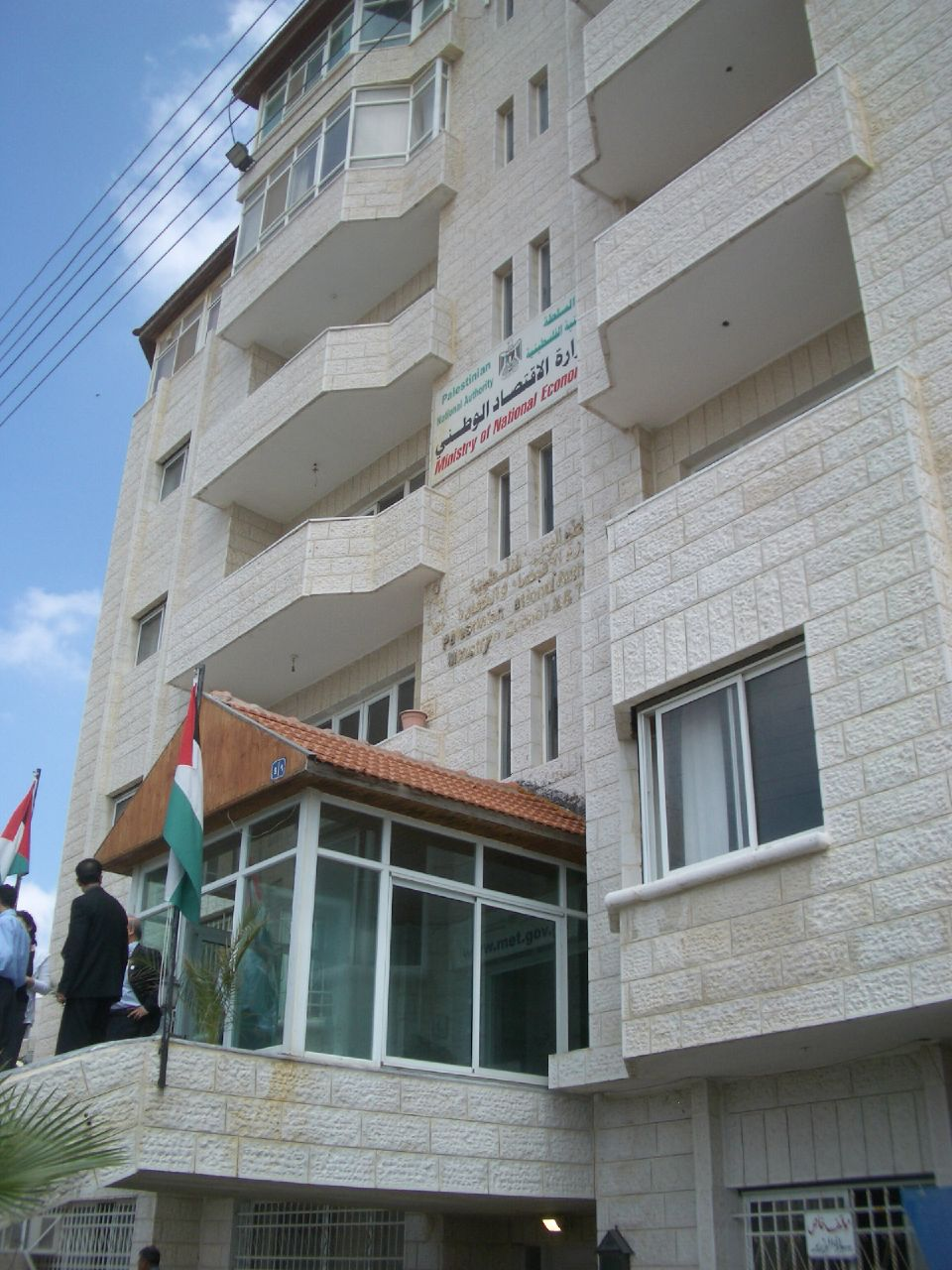

Agency overview
- Formed: 1948 (first form); 1994 (second form)
- Jurisdiction: Government of Palestine
- Headquarters: Ramallah, Palestine
- Minister responsible: Mohammed al-Amour, Minister of National Economy
- Website: www.mne.gov.ps

The Ministry of National Economy is a government agency in Palestine responsible for overseeing the country's economic policies and programs. Its primary role is to promote economic development and growth through the implementation of various economic policies and programs. The current minister is Mohammed al-Amour.

The ministry is responsible for a range of functions, including the development and implementation of economic policies, the management of public finances, the regulation of economic activity, and the promotion of trade and investment.

Some of the specific areas of focus for the Ministry of National Economy in Palestine include:

- Promoting private sector development and entrepreneurship
- Encouraging foreign investment and trade
- Developing and implementing policies to support economic growth and development
- Managing public finances and ensuring fiscal sustainability
- Regulating economic activity to ensure fair competition and protect consumers

== List of ministers ==
All-Palestine Government

#	Name	Party	Government	Term start	Term end	Notes
Minister of Economy
1	Foti Freij	Independent	All-Palestine	22 September 1948	September 1952	

Government of Palestine

#	Name	Party	Government	Term start	Term end	Notes
Minister of Economy and Trade
1	Ahmed Qurei	Fatah	1	5 July 1994	17 May 1996	
2	Maher al-Masri	Fatah	2, 3	17 May 1996	13 June 2002	
Minister of Economy, Trade and Industry
2	Maher al-Masri	Fatah	4, 5	13 June 2002	30 April 2003	
Minister of National Economy
2	Maher al-Masri	Fatah	6	30 April 2003	7 October 2003	
Minister of National Economy and Trade
3	Salam Fayyad	Independent	7	7 October 2003	12 November 2003	
Minister of National Economy
(2)	Maher al-Masri	Fatah	8	12 November 2003	24 February 2005	
4	Mazen Sinokrot	Independent	9	24 February 2005	29 March 2006	
5	Alaeddin al-Araj	Independent	10	29 March 2006	17 March 2007	
6	Ziad Al-Zaza	Hamas	11	17 March 2007	14 June 2007	
7	Muhammad Kamal Hassouna	Independent	12	14 June 2007	19 May 2009	
8	Bassem Khoury	Independent	13	19 May 2009	24 October 2009	
9	Hasan Abu-Libdeh	Independent	13	24 October 2009	16 May 2012	
10	Jawad Naji	Independent	14, 15, 16	16 May 2012	2 June 2014	
11	Mohammad Mustafa	Independent	17	2 June 2014	31 March 2015	Serving Deputy Prime Minister
12	Abeer Odeh	Independent	17	31 March 2015	13 April 2019	
13	Khaled Al Osaili	Independent	18	13 April 2019	31 March 2024	
14	Mohammed al-Amour	Independent	19	31 March 2024	Incumbent	
