= Ministry of Information (Palestine) =

High government position Palestine

Agency overview
- Formed: 1994
- Jurisdiction: Government of Palestine
- Headquarters: Ramallah, Palestine

The Ministry of Information is the ministry in charge of election polls and media in Palestine. The Minister of Information has a role in advising the Prime Minister of Palestine. In 2002, the ministry was merged with the Culture and Arts Ministry.

== List of ministers ==
#	Name	Party	Government	Term start	Term end	Notes
Minister of Culture and Information
1	Yasser Abed Rabbo	Palestinian Democratic Union	1, 2, 3, 4, 5	5 July 1994	30 April 2003	
Minister of Information
2	Nabil Amr	Independent	6	30 April 2003	7 October 2003	
3	Ahmed Qurei	Fatah	7, 8	7 October 2003	27 September 2004	Serving Prime Minister
4	Saeb Erekat	Fatah	8	27 September 2004	24 February 2005	
5	Nabil Shaath	Fatah	9	24 February 2005	3 January 2006	Serving Deputy Prime Minister
6	Yousef Rizqa	Hamas	10	29 March 2006	17 March 2007	
7	Mustafa Barghouti	Palestinian National Initiative	11	17 March 2007	14 June 2007	
8	Riyad al-Maliki	Independent	12	14 June 2007	19 May 2009	
	Vacant		13, 14, 15, 16, 17	19 May 2009	2 August 2018	
9	Nabil Abu Rudeineh	Independent	17, 18	2 August 2018	31 March 2024	Serving Deputy Prime Minister
	Vacant		19	31 March 2024	Present	
