= Hanna Nasser =

Former Mayor of Bethlehem (1937–2015)

Mayor of Bethlehem
- In office 1997–2005
- Preceded by: Elias Freij
- Succeeded by: Victor Batarseh

Personal details
- Born: Hanna Jamil Nasser; 1937 Bethlehem, Mandatory Palestine
- Died: 5 July 2015 (aged 77–78) Bethlehem, Palestine

Hanna Nasser (1937 – 5 July 2015) was a Palestinian politician who served as the mayor of Bethlehem from 1997 to 2005, being succeeded by Victor Batarseh. Nasser was a Palestinian Christian. On 24 December 2013, Palestinian President Mahmoud Abbas awarded him the Order of Merit and Distinction.

== See also ==
- Palestinian Christians

Political offices
Preceded by Elias Freij	Mayor of Bethlehem; 1997–2005	Succeeded by Victor Batarseh
