= Nabil Abu Rudeineh =

Palestinian politician (born 1946)

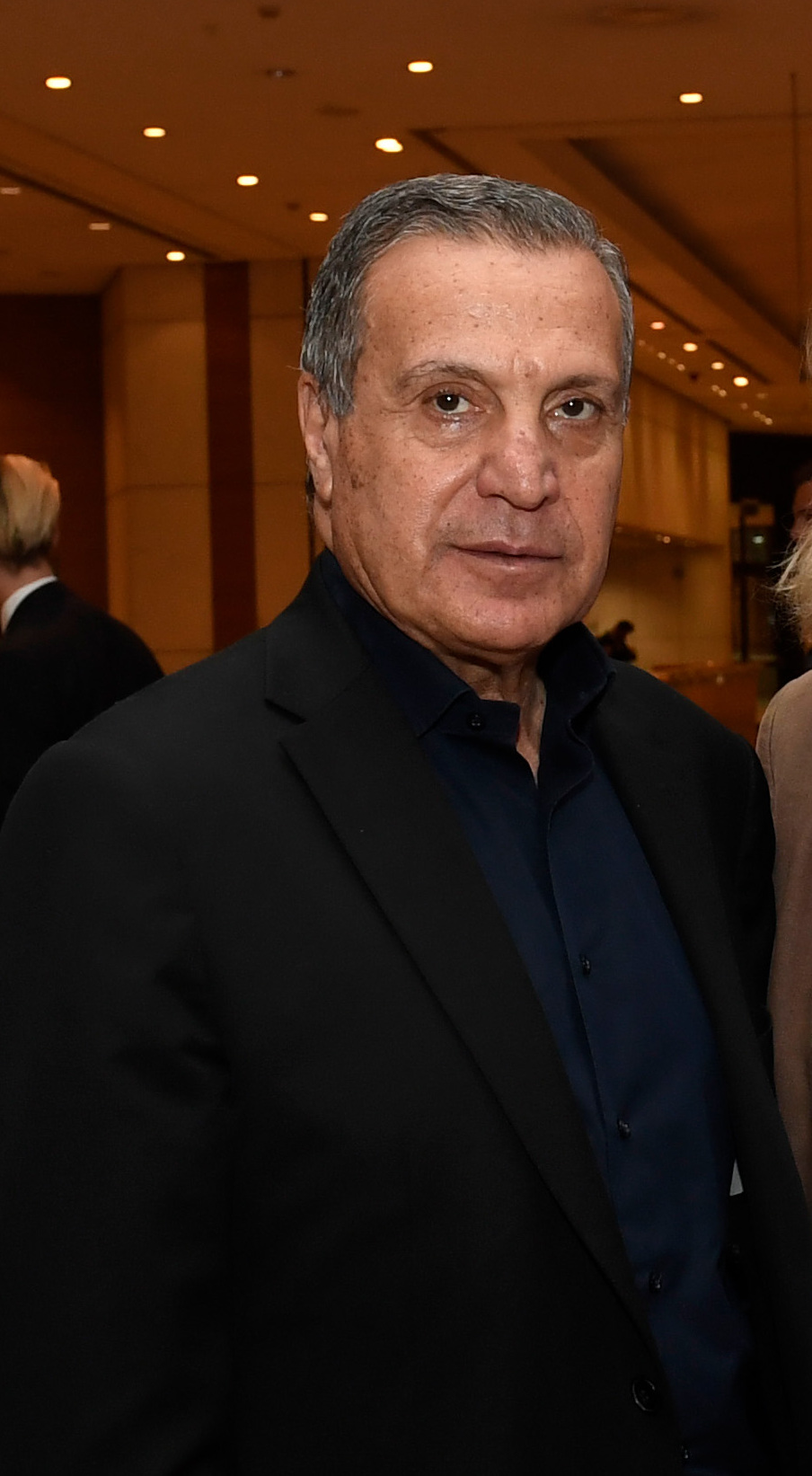
- Abu Rudeineh in 2019

Deputy Prime Minister of Palestine
- In office 2 August 2018 – 31 March 2024 Serving with Ziad Abu Amr
- President: Mahmoud Abbas
- Prime Minister: Rami Hamdallah; Mohammad Shtayyeh
- Preceded by: Mohammad Mustafa (2015)
- Succeeded by: Vacant

Minister of Information
- In office 2 August 2018 – 31 March 2024
- Prime Minister: Rami Hamdallah; Mohammad Shtayyeh
- Preceded by: Riyad al-Maliki (2009)
- Succeeded by: Vacant

Personal details
- Born: 3 May 1946 (age 79) Bethlehem, Palestine
- Occupation: Politician

Nabil Abu Rudeineh (born 3 May 1946) is a Palestinian politician who served as the Deputy Prime Minister of Palestine and Minister of Information in the Palestinian government of 2019.

Political offices
Vacant Title last held by Mohammad Mustafa	Deputy Prime Minister of Palestine; 2018–2024; Served alongside: Ziad Abu Amr	Vacant
Vacant Title last held by Riyad al-Maliki	Minister of Information; 2018–2024	Vacant
