= Abeer Odeh =

Palestinian politician (born 1962)

- عبير عودة
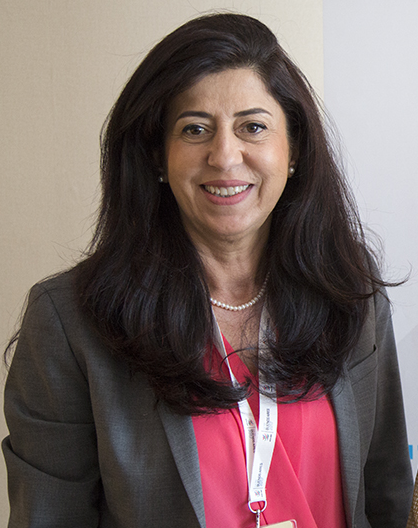

Palestinian Ambassador to Italy
- Incumbent
- Assumed office 2019
- President: Mahmoud Abbas
- Preceded by: Mai al-Kaila

Minister of National Economy
- In office 31 March 2015 – 13 April 2019
- President: Mahmoud Abbas
- Prime Minister: Rami Hamdallah
- Preceded by: Mohammad Mustafa
- Succeeded by: Khaled Al Osaili

Personal details
- Born: 1962 (age 63–64) East Jerusalem, Jordanian-administered West Bank, Palestine
- Party: Independent
- Education: BA in Accounting from Birzeit University; MBA from Kellogg School of Management at Northwestern University
- Alma mater: Birzeit University; Northwestern University
- Profession: Auditor; Project Director at the World Bank; Chief Financial Analyst at USAID; Chief Executive Officer for the Palestine Capital Markets Authority; Ambassador of Palestine to Italy
- Known for: First woman to serve as Minister of National Economy in the Palestinian Authority

Abeer Odeh (Arabic: عبير عودة, romanized: ‘Abīr ‘Awda; born 1962) is a Palestinian politician who is the first woman to serve as the minister of national economy in the Palestinian Authority. She has held multiple international positions in the fields of finance and economics.

== Education ==
Odeh received her BA in Accounting from Birzeit University, in the West Bank. She received her MBA from the Kellogg School of Management at Northwestern University (1999–2001), in the United States. Odeh is also certified by the American Institute of Certified Public Accountants.

== Career and activism ==
Odeh held multiple senior management positions within the private sector and with donor agencies. She worked as an Auditor in the public sector from 1987 to 1995. Odeh worked as a Project Director at the World Bank from 1998 to 2000. From 2001 to 2009, she worked as Chief Financial Analyst at USAID in the West Bank and Gaza. She spent six years working as the Chief Executive Officer for the Palestine Capital Markets Authority (PCMA) (from 2009 to 2015). In 2015, she was appointed the Minister of National Economy in Palestine, becoming the first woman to serve in this position. She served as Minister of National Economy three years. Currently, she is the ambassador of Palestine to Italy, since 2019.

As a Minister, she chaired the Palestinian Investment Promotion Agency (PIPA), Palestine Industrial Estates and the Free Zones Authority (PIEFZA), and the Palestine Standards Institute (PSI). Odeh is an advocate for Palestinian rights. As Ambassador from Palestine to Italy, Odeh released a statement calling for international support of Palestinian rights. In it, she highlighted Palestine's peaceful efforts to resist, but also noted that it is "understandable for an oppressed people to try to exercise their right to self-defense" (translated from Italian).

Political offices
| Preceded by Mohammad Mustafa | Minister of National Economy; 2015–2019 | Succeeded by Khaled Al Osaili |
Diplomatic posts
| Preceded by Mai al-Kaila | Palestinian Ambassador to Italy; 2019–present | Incumbent |
