= Khaled Al Osaili =

Palestinian politician and businessman

Khalid Al Osaili
- خالد العسيلي
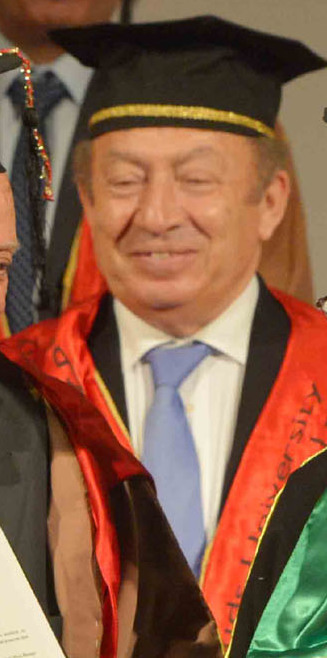

Minister of National Economy
- In office 13 April 2019 – 31 March 2024
- President: Mahmoud Abbas
- Prime Minister: Mohammad Shtayyeh
- Preceded by: Abeer Odeh
- Succeeded by: Mohammed al-Amour

Mayor of Hebron
- In office April 2006 – October 2012
- President: Mahmoud Abbas

Personal details
- Born: Khaled Zuhair Khaled Al Osaili; 1 February 1947 (age 79) Hebron, Palestine
- Party: Independent
- Spouse: Samia Fawzi Marqa
- Education: Cairo University
- Profession: Politician, businessman

Khaled Zuhair Khaled Al Osaili (Abu Zuhair; born 1 February 1947) is a Palestinian politician and businessman. He served as the mayor of Hebron in the State of Palestine from 2006 to 2012 and served as the Minister of National Economy from 2019 to 2024 within the government of Mohammad Shtayyeh.

Political offices
Preceded by –	Mayor of Hebron; 2006–2012	Succeeded by –
Preceded by Abeer Odeh	Minister of National Economy; 2019–2024	Succeeded by Mohammed al-Amour
