= Riyad al-Maliki =

Palestinian politician (born 1955)

- رياض المالكي
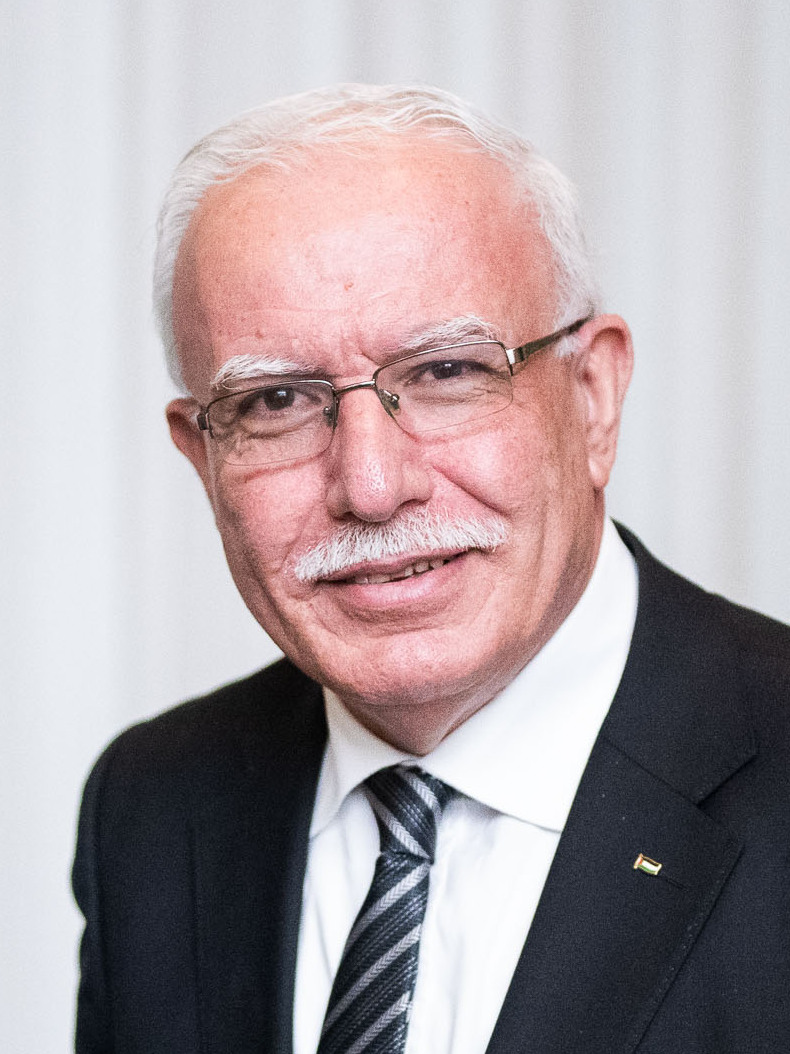
- Al-Maliki in 2024

Minister of Foreign Affairs and Expatriates
- In office 19 May 2009* – 31 March 2024
- President: Mahmoud Abbas
- Prime Minister: Salam Fayyad; Rami Hamdallah; Mohammad Shtayyeh
- Preceded by: Salam Fayyad
- Succeeded by: Mohammad Mustafa

Minister of Information
- In office 15 June 2007 – 19 May 2009
- President: Mahmoud Abbas
- Prime Minister: Salam Fayyad
- Preceded by: Mustafa Barghouti
- Succeeded by: Nabil Abu Rudeineh (2018)

Personal details
- Born: 31 May 1955 (age 71) Bethlehem, Jordanian-administered West Bank, Palestine
- Party: Independent (1996–present)
- Other political affiliations: Popular Front for the Liberation of Palestine (before 1996)
- Education: Pontifical Xavierian University; American University
- *al-Maliki's term was disputed by Muhammad Awad from May 2011 to September 2012, and Ismail Haniyeh from September 2012 to 2 June 2014, both representing Hamas.

Riyad al-Maliki (Arabic: رياض المالكي; born 31 May 1955) is a Palestinian politician and former minister of information, government spokesperson, and minister of foreign affairs of the Palestinian National Authority in its 13th government. He also resumed office as foreign affairs minister from the 14th to the 18th government.

== Biography ==
He was born on 31 May 1955 in Bethlehem, and earned a bachelor's degree in civil engineering from Pontifical Xavierian University in Colombia in 1978 and a PhD in civil engineering at the American University.

He started working as a lecturer in the Civil Engineering Department of Birzeit University in 1981 and served as the head of the department from 1993 to 1996. He also founded and headed Panorama, the Palestinian Center for the Dissemination of Democracy and Community Development, an active non-governmental organization. He also served as spokesman for the Popular Front for the Liberation of Palestine.

He was awarded the European Peace Prize in 2000 in Copenhagen and the Italian Peace Prize (Lombardi) in 2005. He is the coordinator of the Arab Program to Support and Develop Democracy, which is an alliance of more than 12 civil society institutions. He is also a visiting professor in several European universities.

In 2007, al-Maliki was one of three government ministers who investigated the circumstances of Palestinians who were stranded on the Egyptian side of the border along the Gaza Strip, because the only border crossing available to them was Israeli-controlled and they feared interrogation or arrest.

His VIP travel card was confiscated by Israeli border security in 2021 as per the instructions of Benjamin Netanyahu. This was done after he returned from a meeting of the International Criminal Court. The Palestinians had asked the International Court of Justice for an opinion on the legal consequences of Israel's occupation of Palestinian Territories.

== See also ==
- List of foreign ministers in 2017

Political offices
Preceded by Mustafa Barghouti	Minister of Information; 2007–2009	Vacant Title next held by Nabil Abu Rudeineh
Preceded by Salam Fayyad	Minister of Foreign Affairs and Expatriates; 2009–2024	Succeeded by Mohammad Mustafa
