= List of ambassadors of Palestine to Italy =

Coordinates: 39.937704°N 116.460642°E

Ambassador of State of Palestine to the Italy
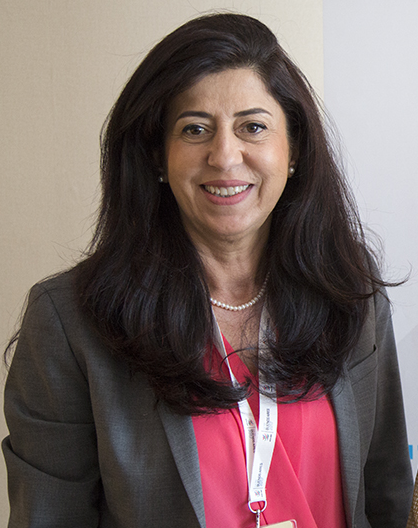
- Incumbent; Abeer Odeh since September 12, 2019
- Inaugural holder: Wael Zwaiter
- Formation

The Palestinian ambassador in Rome is the official representative of the Palestinian government to the Government of Italy.

== List of representatives ==
Diplomatic agrément/Diplomatic accreditation	ambassador		Observations	President of Palestine	President of Italy	Term end
Diplomatic agrément/Diplomatic accreditation	Name in Arabic	Name in English	Observations	President of Palestine	President of Italy	Term end
1974	نمر حماد	Nemer Hammad		Yasser Arafat Mahmoud Abbas	Giovanni LeoneSandro Pertini Francesco Cossiga Oscar Luigi Scalfaro Carlo Azeglio Ciampi	2005
2006	صبري حج أسعد عطية	Sabri Attia		Mahmoud Abbas	Carlo Azeglio Ciampi Giorgio Napolitano	2013
1 October 2013	مي الكيلة	Mai al-Kaila	She was ambassador to Chile from 2005-2013, and a member of the Palestinian Revolutionary Council, and in 2019 she was appointed Minister of Health in Muhammad Shtayyeh's government.	Mahmoud Abbas	Giorgio Napolitano Sergio Mattarella	2019
2019	عبير عودة	Abeer Odeh	She was the Minister of National Economy in the first cabinet reshuffle of Rami Hamdallah's third government.	Mahmoud Abbas	Sergio Mattarella	
