= Anton Salman =

Palestinian politician and lawyer (born 1957)

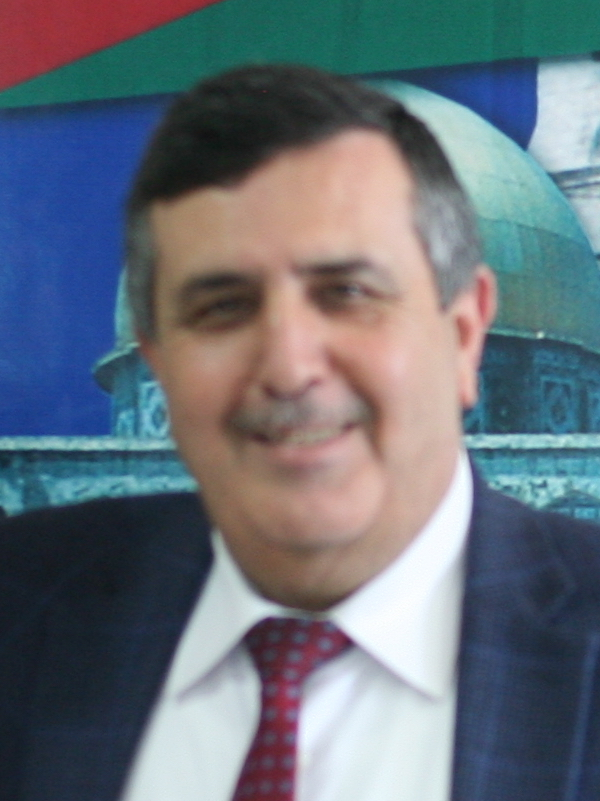

Mayor of Bethlehem
- In office 11 January 2024 – 11 April 2025
- Preceded by: Hanna Hanania
- Succeeded by: Maher Canawati
- In office 27 May 2017 – 21 April 2022
- Preceded by: Vera Baboun
- Succeeded by: Hanna Hanania

Personal details
- Born: 1 December 1957 (age 68) Bethlehem, Jordanian-administered West Bank, Palestine (present-day Bethlehem, Palestine)
- Party: All for Bethlehem
- Other political affiliations: Fatah
- Education: Beirut Arab University

Anton Salman (Arabic: أنطون سلمان; born 1 December 1957) is a Palestinian politician and lawyer who was the mayor of Bethlehem.

Salman previously served as mayor from 2017 to 2022. He was elected to the post in 2017, succeeding Vera Baboun. His "All for Bethlehem" list won 5 out of the 15 seats. He is a lawyer by profession, and a Christian.

Salman returned to the post in January 2024.

Political offices
| Preceded by Vera Baboun | Mayor of Bethlehem; 2017–2022 | Succeeded by Hanna Hanania |
| Preceded by Hanna Hanania | Mayor of Bethlehem; 2024–2025 | Succeeded by Maher Canawati |
