= Varsen Aghabekian =

Palestinian foreign minister since 2025

- فارسين أغابكيان; Վարսեն Աղաբեկյան
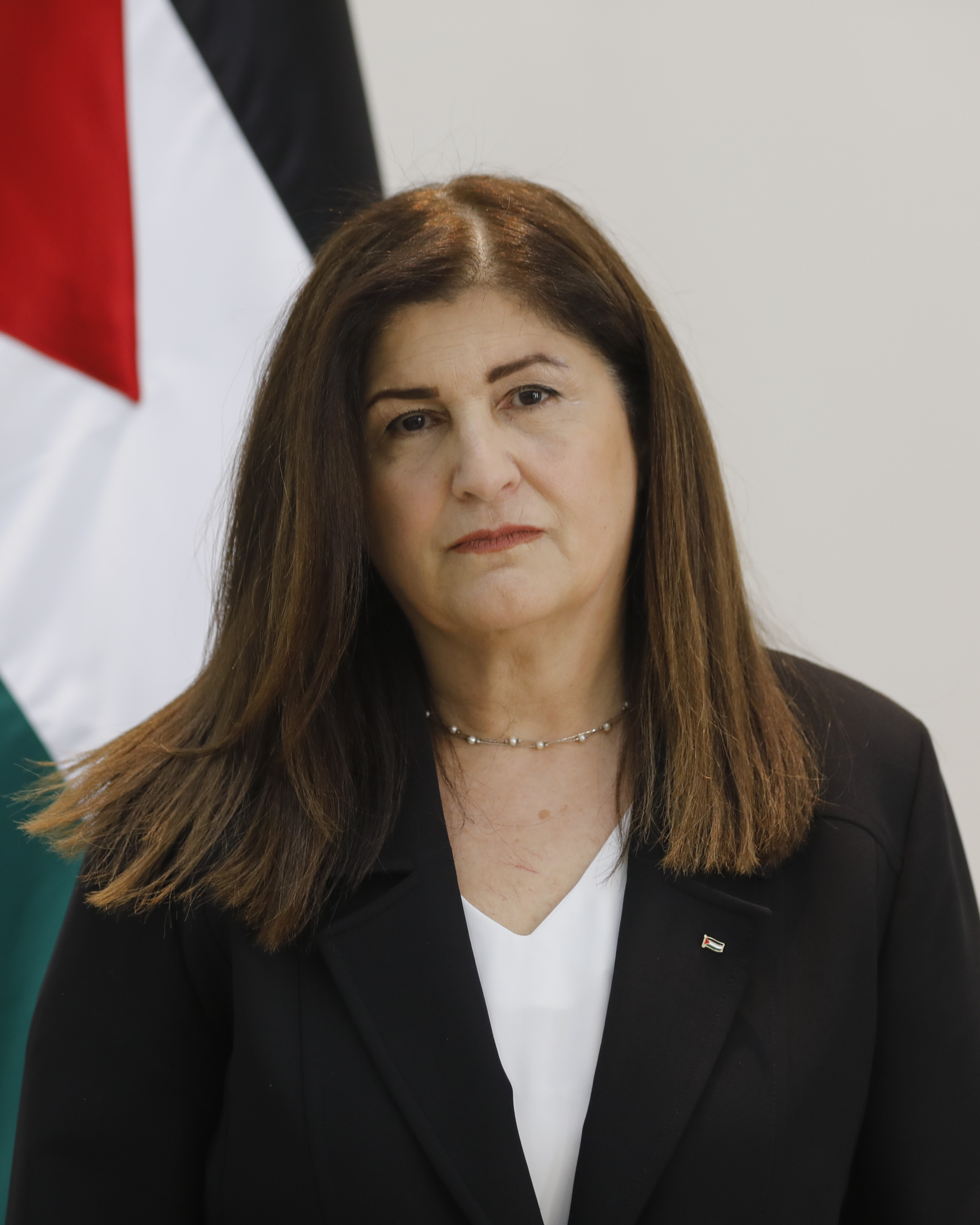
- Aghabekian in 2024

Minister of Foreign Affairs and Expatriates
- Incumbent
- Assumed office 23 June 2025
- President: Mahmoud Abbas
- Prime Minister: Mohammad Mustafa
- Preceded by: Mohammad Mustafa

Minister of State for Foreign Affairs and Expatriates
- In office 31 March 2024 – 23 June 2025
- President: Mahmoud Abbas
- Prime Minister: Mohammad Mustafa
- Foreign Affairs Minister: Mohammad Mustafa
- Preceded by: Office established
- Succeeded by: Office disestablished

Personal details
- Born: 1958 (age 67–68) Jordan
- Party: Independent
- Education: Indiana University–Purdue University (MS); University of Pittsburgh (PhD)
- Profession: Politician, academic

Varsen Aghabekian (Note: Arabic: فارسين أغابكيان; Armenian: Վարսեն Աղաբեկյան) (born 1958) is a Palestinian politician and academic. She was appointed the minister of state for foreign affairs and expatriates by the Palestinian Authority on 31 March 2024, and then the minister of foreign affairs and expatriates by presidential decree on 23 June 2025. Prior to her tenure in government, Aghabekian worked in cultural and social projects in Palestine and also served as a dean and associate professor at Al-Quds University.

== Early life and education ==
Aghabekian was born in Jordan in 1958. She pursued her higher education in the United States, receiving a master's degree in nursing administration from Indiana University–Purdue University in 1983 and a doctorate in educational policy and management studies from the University of Pittsburgh in 1988.

== Career ==
=== Work in academia and activism ===
From 1988 to 2008, Aghabekian was a professor at Al-Quds University in Jerusalem. She was initially an associate professor before holding a number of administrative positions, including dean of the faculty of health professions from 1995 to 1998 and dean of graduate studies from 1998 to 2000.

She has held key positions in a number of cultural and social projects as well. She served as the coordinator of the human resources development unit of the Palestine Medical Council, director of the institutional building project at the office of the Palestinian president, executive director of the 2009 rendition of the Arab Capital of Culture programme, and commissioner-general of the Independent Commission for Human Rights (2016–2018). Additionally, she is a board member of the Diyar Consortium, a Palestinian organization focusing on cultural and educational development.

An Armenian Christian, Aghabekian is a founding member of the presidential commission for the restoration of the Church of the Nativity, as well as the presidential commission for church affairs. She is an advocate of Christian and women's rights in Palestine.

=== Tenure as foreign minister ===
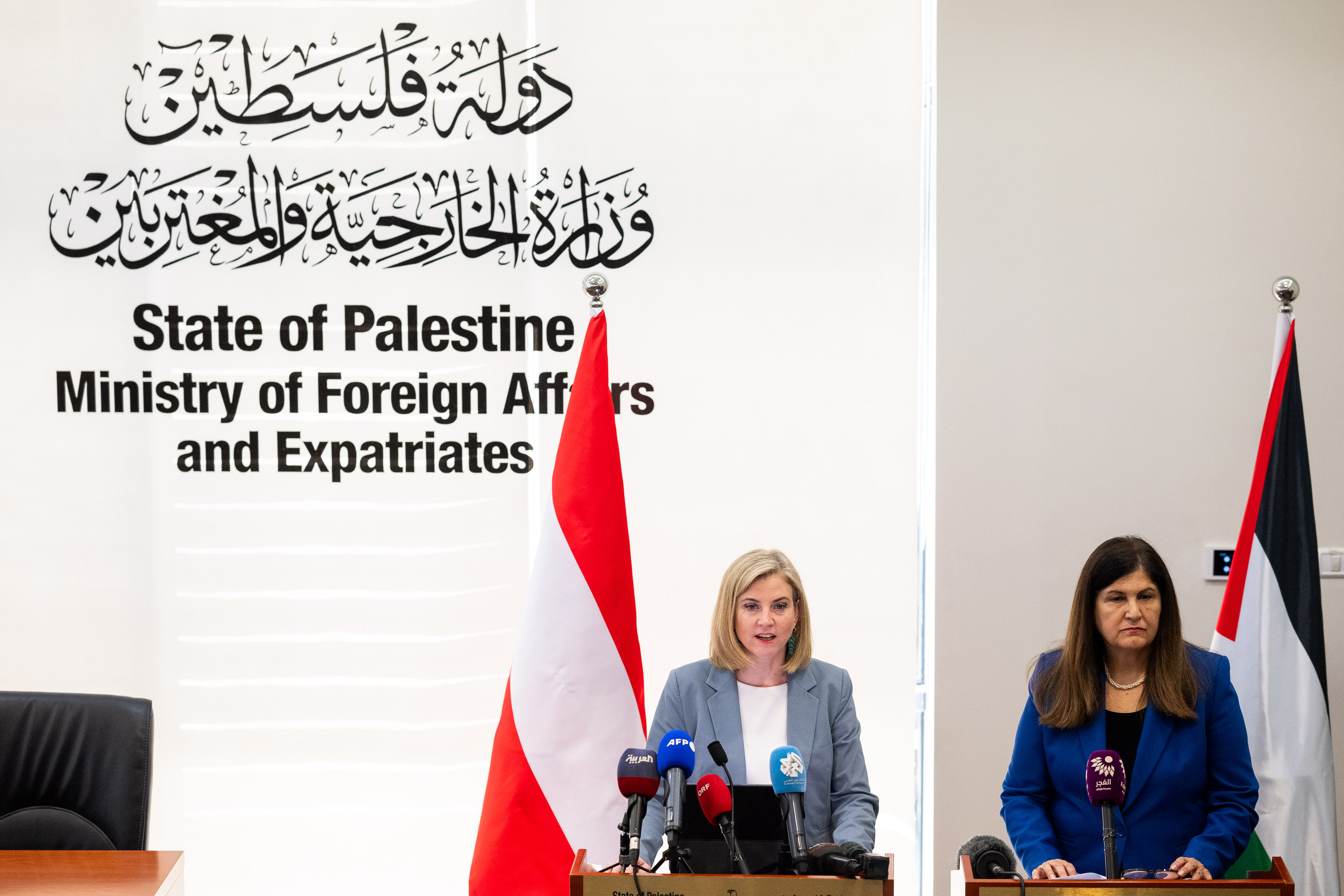
Aghabekian with Austrian foreign minister Beate Meinl-Reisinger in Ramallah, 1 July 2025

The Palestinian Authority appointed Aghabekian as its minister of state for foreign affairs and expatriates on 29 March 2024. It marked the first time an Armenian had been appointed a minister in the government. She was sworn into office two days later on 31 March.

A few weeks before the 2024 US presidential election, Aghabekian expressed hope that the elected candidate would support a two-state solution to the Israeli–Palestinian conflict and pursue a neutral but proactive role in the Middle East. After being re-elected US president, Donald Trump outlined a plan for the US to occupy the Gaza Strip. In response, Aghabekian reiterated the Palestinian Authority's de jure authority over the Gaza Strip, rejected the plan as "unacceptable", and called on other Western countries to do the same.

On 23 June 2025, President Abbas approved the reshuffle of the government of Mohamed Mustafa, and Varsen Aghabekian became minister of foreign affairs and expatriate affairs in place of Mohamed Mustafa. On 15 July 2025, the EU's top diplomat Kaja Kallas and the foreign ministers of the EU member states agreed not to take any action against Israel over alleged Israeli war crimes in the Gaza war and settler violence in the West Bank. The proposed sanctions against Israel included suspending the EU-Israel Association Agreement, suspending visa-free travel, or blocking imports from Israeli settlements. Aghabekian criticised the decision, saying: "It's shocking and disappointing, because everything is crystal clear. ... The whole world has been seeing what is happening in Gaza. The killing, the atrocities, the war crimes."

== Notes ==
Political offices
New office	Minister of State for Foreign Affairs and Expatriates; 2024–2025	Office abolished
Preceded by Mohammad Mustafa	Minister of Foreign Affairs and Expatriates; 2025–present	Incumbent
