= Victor Batarseh =

Palestinian politician, former Mayor of Bethlehem (born 1935)

Mayor of Bethlehem
- In office 2005–2012
- Preceded by: Hanna Nasser
- Succeeded by: Vera Baboun

Personal details
- Born: January 1, 1935 (age 91) Bethlehem, Mandatory Palestine
- Party: PFLP
- Profession: Politician, otolaryngologist

Victor Hanna Batarseh (Arabic: فيكتور بطارسة, born 1 January 1935) is a Palestinian politician and otolaryngologist who served as the mayor of Bethlehem in the West Bank, from 2005 until 2012. He was replaced by Vera Baboun.

== See also ==
- Palestinian Christians

Political offices
| Preceded by Hanna Nasser | Mayor of Bethlehem; 2005–2012 | Succeeded by Vera Baboun |
