= Bassem Khoury =

Palestinian pharmacist and politician

Bassem Khoury is the former Palestinian Minister of Economy and chairman of Pharmacare Group. He is a member of the Administrative Committee of the Board of Trustees of the Birzeit University.

Khoury was born in 1960 in Jordan. His family were displaced from the Galilee during the Nakba.

Khoury founded the Pharma pharmaceutical factory in 1985. He established the Palestine Insurance Company in 1996. He established National Company for Agro-Industries in 2007. He is a former chairman of the Palestinian Pharmaceutical Association. He is the former president of the Palestinian Federation of Industries.

Khoury stated Israel was choking the Palestinian economy. He resigned from the post of Minister of Economy to protest the Palestinian authority decision to not review the Goldstone Report in March 2009.
