= Palestine Investment Fund =

Sovereign wealth fund of Palestine

- Native name: صندوق الاستثمار الفلسطيني
- Industry: Sovereign wealth fund
- Founded: 2003; 23 years ago
- Headquarters: Palestine
- Key people: Mohammad Mustafa, Chairman and Co-President
- Total assets: $800m (2010)

The Palestine Investment Fund (PIF; Arabic: صندوق الاستثمار الفلسطيني) is an independent investment company aiming to strengthen the Palestinian economy through strategic investments, while maximising long-run returns for its ultimate shareholder; the people of Palestine. Established in 2003, it was created by a transfer of assets previously managed by the Palestinian Authority. Since January 2009, Mohammad Mustafa has been the chairman and co-president of the company.

According to one source, the PIF does two internal audits; one from PricewaterhouseCoopers and another by an internal audit unit. External audits are undertaken by Ernst and Young, who have independently verified that PIF's financials are in accordance with international auditing standards. Furthermore, the State Audit and Administrative Control Bureau audits the PIF's governance and financial systems and, in addition, scores the performance of its internal auditing systems. Even further, the PIF is partners with US OPIC, UK DFID, and the World Bank's IFC.

The fund has signed up to the Santiago Principles on best practices for managing Sovereign Wealth Funds and joined the International Forum of Sovereign Wealth Funds.

Under Palestinian Authority Prime Minister Salaam Fayyad, the PIF was celebrated for its transparent business practices, but since 2011, it has become involved in funding more and more questionable projects.

== Controversies ==
In June 2012, Mohammed Rashid (also known as Khaled Salam), the former economic adviser to Yasser Arafat, was sentenced to 15 years in prison after being found guilty of embezzling from PIF, the PLO and the Palestinian Authority. He was also given a $15 million fine and was ordered to repay the $34 million he embezzled.

In April 2016, Mohammad Mustafa, the company's chairman and co-president, has been named in the Panama Papers.

== Projects ==
The Palestine Investment Fund has undertaken many projects in the Energy, SMEs, Real Estate, Agricultural, Health and Industrial sectors. This includes:

Al-Reehan neighbourhood, a $250 million luxury neighbourhood located 10 kilometres north of Ramallah city centre with over 1,600 housing units.

Al-Jinan neighbourhood, a residential neighbourhood covering 77 dunums of land 3 kilometres east of Jenin city centre. Now fully completed and occupied with 54 villas and 3 apartment buildings, green areas and shopping outlets.

The Ersal Centre, a commercial complex in Ramallah covering 58 dunums, set to include 11 commercial towers and the landmark Amaar Tower. It will also include parks, playgrounds, schools and other institutions.

Moon City 1 and 2, two residential cities under development in the Jordan Valley covering 550 dunums and 2 million square metres of land respectively. Set to include commercial, residential and tourist zones. Both cities are located north of Jericho and close to each other.

== Investments ==
The PIF's wholly owned subsidiaries include:

- Amaar Real Estate Investment Group
- Khazanah Asset Management Company
- The Dead Sea and Al-Aghwar Al-Falastiniyah Development Company
- The Palestinian Commercial Services Company

The PIF has a minority stake in the following projects:

- Telecommunications Program
- Mortgage Finance Program
- SMEs Program
- Energy Program
- Wataniya Mobile
