= Palestine British Business Council =

The Palestine British Business Council (PBBC) is a British private-sector body designed "to facilitate and promote investment opportunities in Palestine." It is composed of UK and Palestinian businesses.
