= Mohammad Mustafa (politician) =

Prime Minister of Palestine

- محمد مصطفى
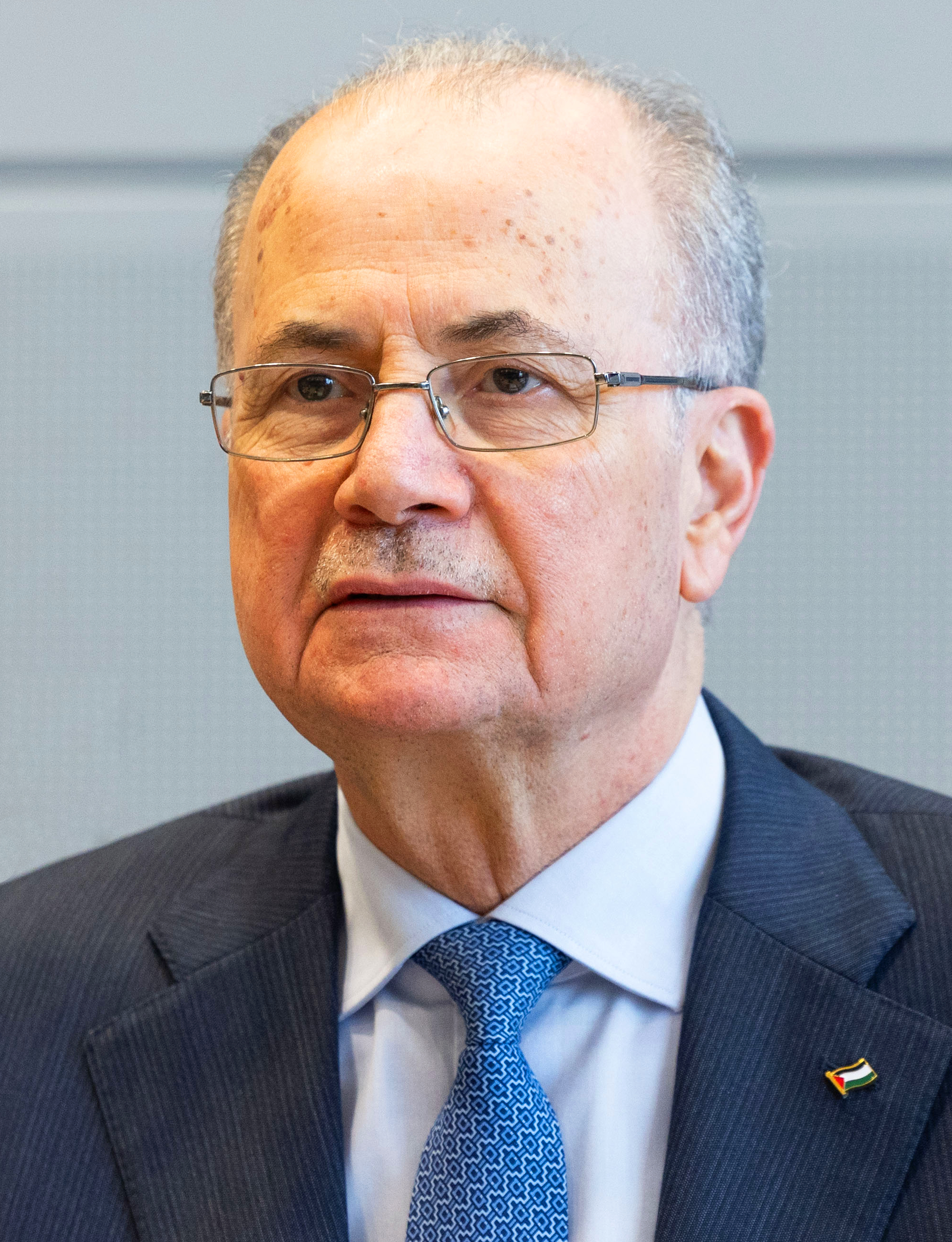
- Mustafa in 2025

4th Prime Minister of Palestine
- Incumbent
- Assumed office 31 March 2024
- President: Mahmoud Abbas
- Preceded by: Mohammad Shtayyeh

Minister of Foreign Affairs and Expatriates
- In office 31 March 2024 – 23 June 2025
- Prime Minister: Himself
- Deputy: Varsen Aghabekian
- Preceded by: Riyad al-Maliki
- Succeeded by: Varsen Aghabekian

Deputy Prime Minister of Palestine
- In office 6 June 2013 – 31 March 2015 Serving with Ziad Abu Amr
- President: Mahmoud Abbas
- Prime Minister: Rami Hamdallah
- Preceded by: Azzam al-Ahmad (2007)
- Succeeded by: Nabil Abu Rudeineh (2018)

Minister of National Economy
- In office 2 June 2014 – 31 March 2015
- Prime Minister: Rami Hamdallah
- Preceded by: Jawad Naji
- Succeeded by: Abeer Odeh

Personal details
- Born: Mohammad Abdullah Mohammad Mustafa; 26 August 1954 (age 72) Kafr Sur, Palestine
- Party: Independent
- Children: 2
- Education: University of Baghdad (BS); George Washington University (MS, PhD)

Mohammad Abdullah Mohammad Mustafa (Arabic: محمد عبد الله محمد مصطفى; born 26 August 1954) is a Palestinian politician and economist who has served as Prime Minister of Palestine since 31 March 2024. He previously served as the Chairman of the Board of the Palestine Investment Fund (PIF), Senior Economic Advisor to President Mahmoud Abbas and an independent member of the Executive Committee of the Palestine Liberation Organization. Previously, he had served as Deputy Prime Minister of Palestine (15th, 16th and 17th governments; 2013–2015) and as Minister of National Economy of Palestine (17th government, 2014–2015).

Mustafa has international experience with government, global institutions, and academia, from spending around 15 years at the World Bank Group in Washington, D.C. Mustafa spent two years as economic advisor to the Government of Kuwait on economic reform and two years as advisor to the Public Investment Fund in the Kingdom of Saudi Arabia. Mustafa also taught as a visiting professor at his alma mater, George Washington University.

== Early life and education ==
Mustafa was born on 26 August 1954 in Kafr Sur, District of Tulkarm, Palestine. As a child, his family was uprooted from their home and took refuge in Kuwait. Mustafa went on to earn a bachelor's degree from Baghdad University in electrical engineering, and a master's degree and Ph.D. from George Washington University.

== Career ==
Mustafa served as the Chairman of the Palestine Investment Fund. Between 2006 and 2013, Mustafa was also the Chief Executive Officer (CEO) of the PIF. Under his leadership, the PIF has become the premier investor in Palestine, having completed c. 60 investments, incentivized $1.2 billion in foreign investment, which has provided Palestinians with c. 75,000 jobs. As CEO of the PIF, Mustafa led the establishment of several leading Palestinian companies including Wataniya Mobile, Amaar Real Estate Investment Company, Al Reehan Real Estate Investment Company, Palestine Power Generation Company, Khazanah Asset Management Company, and Sharakat Fund for Small businesses.

As Deputy Prime Minister, amongst other responsibilities, Mustafa was appointed head of Reconstruction of Gaza following the 2014 Gaza War.

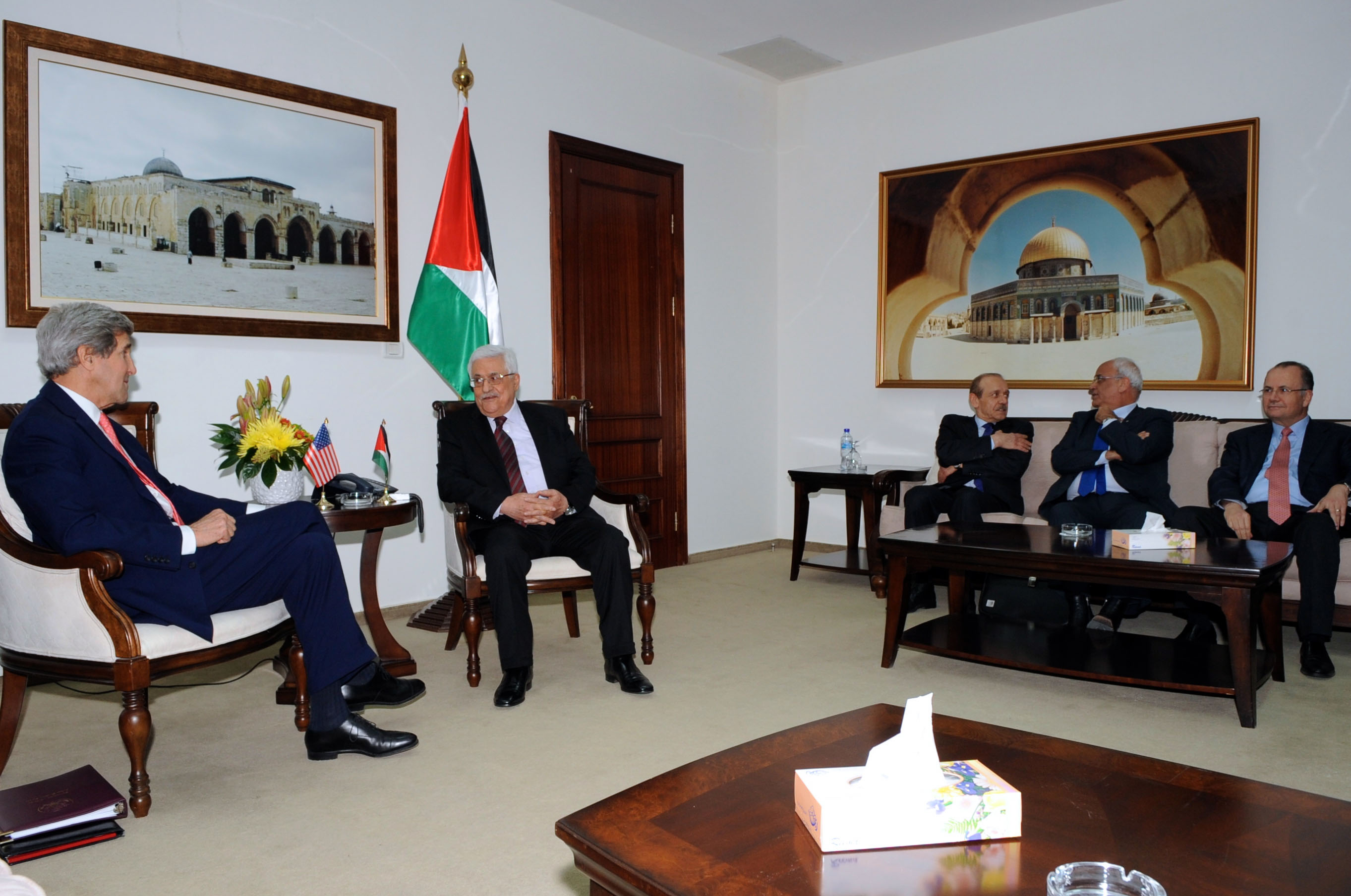
Palestinian Deputy Prime Minister Mohammad Mustafa with Palestinian President Mahmoud Abbas and U.S. Secretary of State John Kerry in Ramallah, West Bank, 3 January 2014

Prior to joining the PIF, Mustafa worked with leading international organizations across global markets. During his time with the World Bank Group, Mustafa held several senior positions across sectors including economic development and reform, project finance, private sector development, telecommunications privatization, and infrastructure development. During his tenure at the World Bank, Mustafa took a sabbatical to work as the founding chief executive officer of PalTel.

In April 2016, Mustafa, was named in the Panama Papers, where it was claimed he used Mossack Fonseca to ensure the transfer of money from Arab countries to the Palestinian Authority.

== Prime Minister of Palestine (2024–present) ==
On 14 March 2024, Palestinian President Mahmoud Abbas appointed Mohammad Mustafa as Prime Minister of the first technocratic government in Palestine's history. His appointment was criticized by other Palestinian political factions such as Hamas, Palestinian Islamic Jihad, the Popular Front for the Liberation of Palestine and the Palestinian National Initiative, who accused Fatah of "forming a new government without national consensus" and describing it as "a reinforcement of a policy of exclusion and the deepening of division". Mustafa was sworn in as prime minister of Palestine on 31 March 2024.

== Personal life ==
Mustafa is married and has two children.

Political offices
Vacant Title last held by Azzam al-Ahmad	Deputy Prime Minister of Palestine; 2013–2015; Served alongside: Ziad Abu Amr	Vacant Title next held by Nabil Abu Rudeineh
Preceded by Jawad Naji	Minister of National Economy; 2014–2015	Succeeded by Abeer Odeh
Preceded by Mohammad Shtayyeh	Prime Minister of Palestine; 2024–present	Incumbent
Preceded by Riyad al-Maliki	Minister of Foreign Affairs and Expatriates; 2024–2025	Succeeded by Varsen Aghabekian
