= List of Fatah members =

The following is a list of members of Fatah, a major Palestinian political party and militia founded sometime between 1958-1959. The list includes leaders, militants, commanders, governors, mayors and financiers that are associated with Fatah and its several various branches.

== List of Fatah founders and early recruits ==
=== Founders ===
- Yasser Arafat
- Khalil al-Wazir

=== First-wave recruits ===
- Salah Khalaf
- Kamal Adwan
- Muhammad Youssef Al-Najjar
- Walid Ahmad Nimr al-Hassan (Abu Ali Iyad)
- Khaled al-Hassan
- Fakhri Al Omari
- Salim al-Za'nun
- Assad Saftawi
- Khaled Yashruti
- Fathi Razem

=== Second-wave recruits ===
- Faruq al-Qaddumi
- Mahmoud Abbas
- Mamdouh Saidam
- Nimr Saleh
- Hayel Abdul Hamid
- Hani al-Hassan
- Muhammad Ghoneim
- Ahmed Qurei
- Majed Abu Sharar
- Abbas Zaki
- Nabil Shaath

== List of other senior members ==
- Ahmad Abdel Rahman
- Atef Abu Bakr
- Hakam Balawi
- Hikmat Zaid (former minister, governor, ambassador, and advisor)
- Rawhi Fattouh
- Faisal Husseini
- Naim Khader
- Adnan Ghaith
- Anis al-Qaq (former deputy minister and ambassador)
- Naif Abu-Sharah (militant commander of al-Aqsa Martyrs Brigade branch)
- Fathi Arafat
- Moussa Arafat (former head of Fatah security forces)
- Mahmoud Labadi (PLO spokesman)
- Marwan Barghouti (head of Tanzim branch)
- Mohammed Dahlan (head of Fatah security forces) (terminated by Mahmoud Abbas)
- Saeb Erakat (adviser)
- Abdullah Franji
- Hanna Mikhail
- Ezzedine Kalak
- Nihad Nusseibeh
- Qadura Fares (governor)
- Sakher Habash
- Uri Davis
- Ilan Halevi
- Ghazi al-Jabali
- Imil Jarjoui (mayor)
- Fadi Kafisha
- Salwa Abu Khadra
- Jibril Rajoub (mayor)
- Ali Hassan Salameh (head of Black September and Force 17 branches)
- Jamal Abu Samhadana
- Sirhan Sirhan (militant associated with al-Aqsa Martyrs Brigades branch)
- Yahya Skaf (militant)
- Zakaria Zubeidi (militant commander of al-Aqsa Martyrs Brigade Branch)
- Zakaria al-Agha Head of Fatah in Gaza Strip (mayor)
- Zakaria Abdul Rahim (militant and diplomat)
