= Eighth General Conference of Fatah =

2026 party conference in Palestine

- Native name: المؤتمر العام الثامن لحركة التحرير الوطني الفلسطيني - فتح
- Date: 14–16 May 2026
- Venue: Palestinian Presidential Headquarters
- Location: Ramallah
- Cause: Reform
- Organised by: Fatah
- Participants: 2,514 members
- Outcome: Mahmoud Abbas was re-elected by consensus as Chairman of the Palestinian National Liberation Movement (Fatah).; The conference pledged to hold the long-overdue Palestinian elections.

The Eighth General Conference of Fatah, officially known as the Eighth General Conference of the Palestinian National Liberation Movement (Fatah), opened on 14 May 2026, with the attendance and participation of 2,514 members. The opening date of the conference coincided with the Nakba anniversary, commemorating the founding of Israel in 1948.

The General Conference constitutes the highest legislative and movement authority within Fatah and undertakes the review of the political programme and the basic statutes as well as the election of the leadership bodies. Fatah is the de facto ruling party of Areas A and B in the West Bank. The seventh conference was held in 2016. It aims to renew the leadership structures via elections to the Central Committee and the Revolutionary Council.

On 29 April 2026, 2,514 members were approved for participation and the “Direct Link” mechanism was announced to ensure cadre involvement in the Gaza Strip, Lebanon, and Egypt. Mahmoud Abbas was unanimously re-elected Chairman of Fatah, drawing criticism from some due to his low approval ratings.

== Results ==
Preliminary results for the elections of the Central Committee and the Revolutionary Council members.

=== Central Committee ===
Candidate	Votes
Marwan Barghouti	1,893
Majed Faraj	1,884
Jibril Rajoub	1,631
Hussein al-Sheikh	1,586
Laila Ghannam	1,494
Mahmoud Aloul	1,488
Tawfik Tirawi	1,378
Yasser Abbas	1,301
Zakaria Zubeidi	1,231
Taysir al-Bardini	1,225
Ahmad Abu Holi	1,208
Ahmed Helles	1,159
Adnan Ghaith	1,092
Musa Abu Zaid	1,034
Dalal Salama	961
Mohammed al-Madani	947
Mohammad Shtayyeh	912
Iyad Safi	901

== See also ==
- July 2025 Conference on the Implementation of the Two-State Solution
