= Salim al-Za'nun =

Palestinian politician (1933–2022)

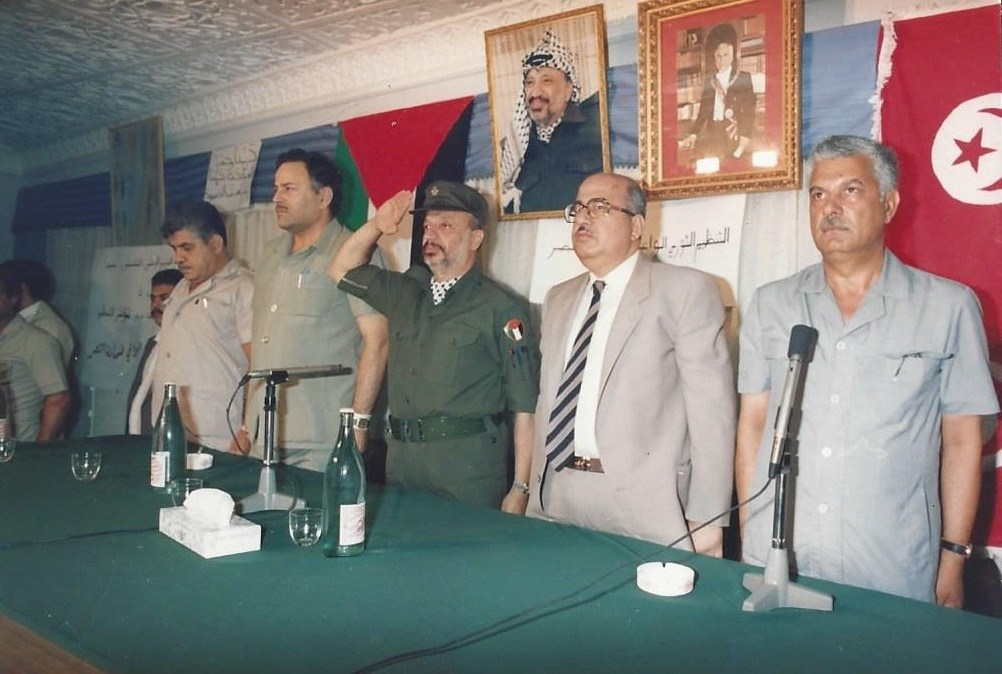
- Opening the course for preparing the organizational staff of the Fatah movement in Tunis (1978) in the presence of Yasser Arafat (center), Salim al-Za'nun (two from right), and Abu Maher Ghneim (far right)

Chairman of the Palestinian National Council
- In office 1993–2022
- Preceded by: Yasser Arafat
- Succeeded by: TBA

President of the Palestinian National Council
- In office 1996–2022
- Preceded by: Yasser Arafat
- Succeeded by: TBA

Member of the Central Committee of Fatah

Chairman of the Arab Parliament
- Incumbent
- Assumed office March 2010

Personal details
- Born: 28 December 1933 Gaza
- Died: 14 December 2022 (aged 88) Amman, Jordan
- Party: Fatah
- Education: Cairo University
- Occupation: Politician

Salim al-Za'nun (Arabic: سليم الزعنون; 28 December 1933 – 14 December 2022), also known as Salim Zanoun or Abu al-Adib, was a Palestinian politician. He served as the chairman of the Palestinian National Council from 1993. Al-Za'nun was one of the founders of the Fatah party, and remained a member of its central committee.

Al-Za'nun was born in Gaza on 28 December 1933. He began studying law at Cairo University in 1955. He obtained a diploma in law in 1957, and a diploma in politics and economy in 1958. He was elected by general assent to the presidency of the PNC in 1996, at its 21st Session held in Gaza. He assumed the rotating chairmanship of the Arab Parliament at its 16th Congress in March 2010.

On February 8, 2020, al-Za'nun called on Arab countries during an extraordinary meeting of the Arab Inter-Parliamentary Union in Amman, to throw more weight behind the Palestinian people, including material, political and parliamentary backing, and to oppose the recently unveiled US move.

== Death ==
Al-Za'nun died on 14 December 2022, at the age of 89 in Amman, Jordan. He is buried at Sahab Cemetery located in Amman.

== See also ==
- List of Fatah members
- Salah Al-Zawawi
