= Majed Faraj =

Palestinian intelligence officer and politician (born 1963)

- ماجد فرج
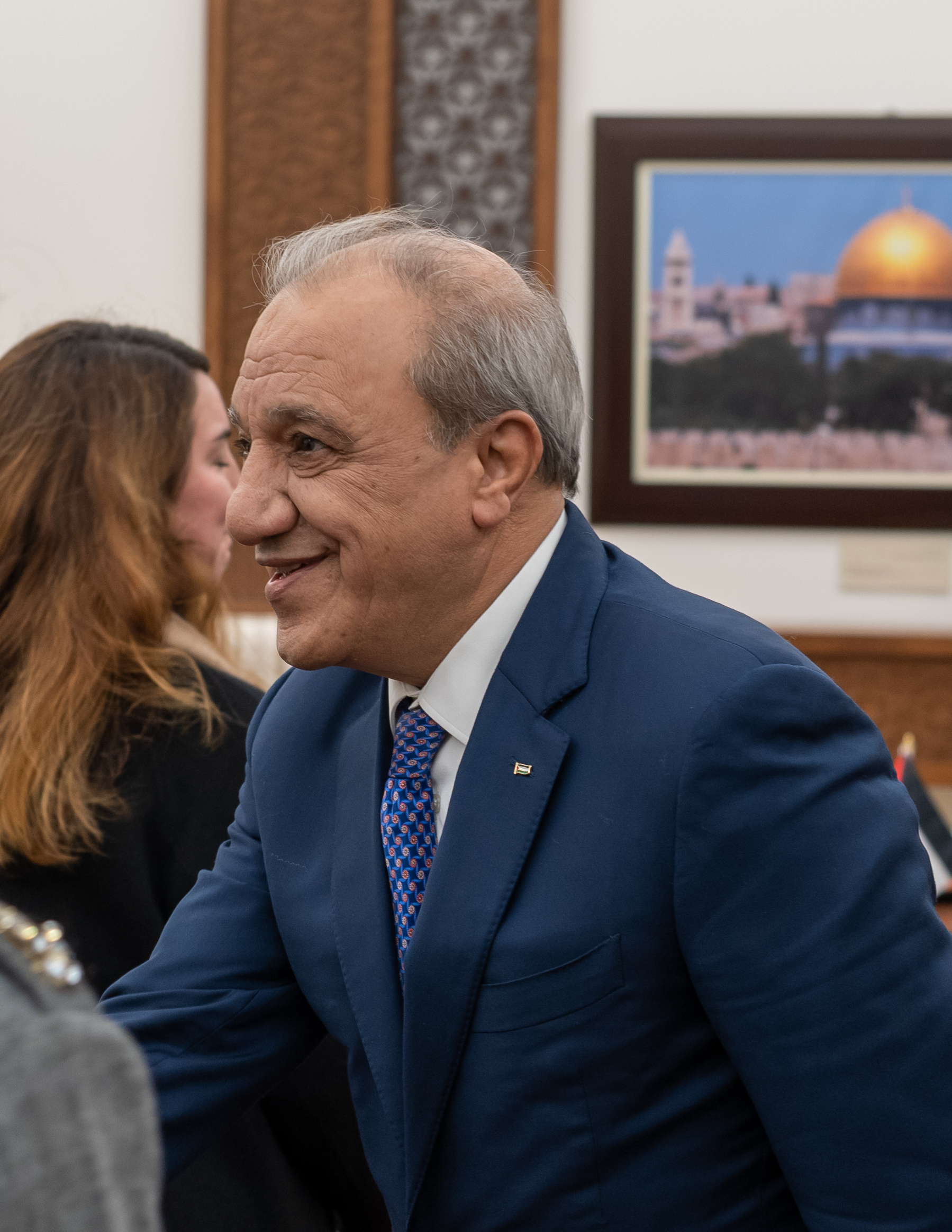
- Faraj in 2023
- Born: 28 February 1963 (age 63); Dheisheh, Jordanian-administered West Bank, Palestine
- Education: Al-Quds Open University
- Spouse: Amal Faraj
- Children: 3
- Military career
- Allegiance: Palestine
- Branch: Palestinian Security Services
- Service years: 1995–present
- Rank: Major general
- Commands: Palestinian Military Intelligence Service (2006–2009); General Intelligence Service (2009–present)

Majed Faraj (Arabic: ماجد فرج; born 28 February 1963) is a Palestinian intelligence officer with the rank of major general and politician who has served as the director of the General Intelligence Service (GIS) since 2009, and on the Central Committee of Fatah since 2026. A close associate of Palestinian president Mahmoud Abbas, Faraj is considered one of his most likely successors.

An activist in his youth, he initially aligned himself with the Popular Front for the Liberation of Palestine as a teenager. He later joined the Fatah, founding its youth organization. After spending six years in Israeli prisons for his activities, he joined the Palestinian Authority's intelligence services shortly after its establishment. He was appointed director of the GIS in September 2009, forging close relations with the American Central Intelligence Agency and the Israeli Shin Bet. These relations have earned him international backing for succeeding Abbas, but have made him a controversial figure in Palestine.

== Early life and activism ==
Faraj was born in the Dheisheh refugee camp on 28 February 1963 to a family who was displaced from Ras Abu 'Ammar during the 1948 Palestine War. He was the second of six siblings. His mother died when he was 13, pushing the family into poverty and forcing him to work several jobs to support them.

He joined the Popular Front for the Liberation of Palestine (PFLP) when he was a teenager, but later switched to the Fatah. He was imprisoned by Israeli authorities for the first time before completing high school over his activities with the PFLP, spending a year and a half in jail. He would be arrested 15 more times, spending six years total in Israeli prisons, where he learned Hebrew. He was held in Far'a, ad-Dhahiriya, the Moscovia Detention Centre, Hebron, Nablus, Atlit, and the Negev. He founded the Shabiba youth movement of the Fatah in 1982, and later participated in the First Intifada.

Faraj was educated at UNRWA schools in Dheisheh, and received a bachelor's degree in management from al-Quds Open University in 1995.

== Military career ==
In 1995, a year after the Palestinian Authority (PA) was formed with the ratification of the Oslo Accords, Faraj joined the Palestinian Preventive Security (PPS) in Bethlehem. He was appointed director of its apparatus in the Dura area. During this time, he formed a plot to recruit Israelis into Palestinian intelligence agencies, sending letters to PPS head Jibril Rajoub in 1999 detailing attempts to recruit female Israeli soldiers. This plan was quickly uncovered, forcing him to abandon it. In 2000, he was appointed to lead the PPS in Hebron Governorate, and in 2003, served as an advisor to Hakam Balawi, the minister of interior. He became the director of the Palestinian Military Intelligence Service in 2006.

=== Director of the General Intelligence Service ===
On 15 September 2009, Faraj was appointed as director of the GIS by PA president Mahmoud Abbas, taking responsibility for counterterrorism efforts.

He was involved in reconciliation efforts with Hamas, participating in a Fatah delegation that held talks with the group in Cairo from 2009 to 2011. The talks in 2009, led by Omar Abd al-Razaq, intended to ease tensions between the two organizations. In 2012, he negotiated the release of two Swedish women held in Syria by al-Nusra Front. He later participated in a Palestine Liberation Organization delegation to the Gaza Strip in April 2014 after the formation of a government led by Rami Hamdallah. In March 2018, Faraj and Hamdallah survived an assassination attempt in Gaza after an explosive detonated near their convoy. The PA accused Hamas of responsibility for the attack, although the group denied this and condemned it. Hamdallah later met with Hamas leader Ismail Haniyeh, where they accused "Israel and its collaborators" of committing the attack. Abbas later rejected this statement and again accused Hamas of being the perpetrator.

Under previous Palestinian law (General Intelligence Law No. 17, 2005), which dictated that the GIS director may only serve a four-year term, Faraj's term as intelligence chief ended in 2013. However, he remained in office, having managed to convince Abbas to extend his term indefinitely rather than a one-year extension he was supposed to receive. Faraj used his close relations to the president, which formed after a fallout with his associate, Hussein al-Sheikh, to influence his decision. On 10 January 2023, Abbas amended the law to allow the GIS director to serve for unlimited time, promoting them to the status of minister. This decision was apparently influenced by Israel, the United States, and the European Union.

In March 2025, it was reported that Abbas intended to remove Faraj as GIS director, as part of a purge of Palestinian security officials. He had earlier dismissed the leaders of the Palestinian National Security Forces, the PPS, and the police and civil defense, leaving Faraj as the final security chief to retain his post.

==== Ties with Israeli and Western intelligence ====
Faraj is also responsible for coordinating with the Israeli Shin Bet, and has been involved in negotiations with Israel. Thus, he has developed close ties with the agency. He was also close to Yoav Mordechai, the head of the Israeli Civil Administration in the West Bank. His security coordination with Israel has made him a controversial figure in Palestine, although his willingness to work with Western officials has garnered him support from governments internationally. He defended his security ties with Israel in a 2016 interview with Defense News, stating that it was preventing chaos and the rise of militias that could destabilize the region, such as the Islamic State and al-Nusra Front. He also announced that Palestinian security forces had foiled over 200 attack plots against Israel and arrested 100 suspects.

In April 2012, Faraj was part of a delegation that met Israeli prime minister Benjamin Netanyahu at his official residence in Jerusalem. He met with the Central Intelligence Agency (CIA) and the Department of State in Washington, D.C., in 2013, where he received an honorary award by the US government for providing valuable intelligence to US and Israeli intelligence agencies, including information that led to the capture of senior al-Qaeda operative Abu Anas al-Libi by the Delta Force. Faraj became well-liked by American diplomats such as John Kerry and Martin Indyk, and developed a close relationship with Gen. John R. Allen.

In April 2018, Faraj met with CIA director Mike Pompeo during a visit to Washington, where the two discussed issues including a Palestinian National Council meeting that occurred days earlier. He became the highest-ranking Palestinian to meet with US representatives since the PA imposed a boycott of the Donald Trump administration over Trump's recognition of Jerusalem as the capital of Israel. Later in September, he headed a delegation of security officials that met with the CIA in Washington.

In August 2021, CIA director William J. Burns traveled to the West Bank to meet with Faraj and Abbas. In January 2022, it was reported that he met with Israeli foreign minister Yair Lapid, where they discussed economic issues and security coordination without mentioning diplomatic relations. Israeli defense minister Yoav Gallant reportedly considered him among other Palestinian officials to manage Gaza after the Gaza war. In May 2025, Faraj arrived in Washington to meet CIA director John Ratcliffe and several other senior officials, becoming the first senior PA leader to visit the US under the second Trump administration.

==== Controversies ====
In 2013, Hamas accused him of inciting public opinion against it alongside the Egyptian government, claiming that it received documents signed by Faraj detailing an organized media campaign that intended to spread false information about the group's involvement in Egyptian internal affairs.

In June 2016, the UK-based Arab Organization for Human Rights accused Faraj of arbitrary detentions and torture in a complaint to the International Criminal Court.

== Political career ==
Faraj, the only Palestinian security leader with a role in politics, is seen as among the most likely successors to Abbas, who faces health complications from old age, as president of the PA. He enjoys support from the US for the role due to his ties to Israeli intelligence, as well as from moderate Arab nations, who endorse his security expertise and commitment to regional stability. He is also supported in refugee camps, although enjoys little support outside of them due to his ties with Israel and crackdown on militias in the West Bank. His most prominent competitors are Hussein al-Sheikh, Jibril Rajoub, Marwan Barghouti, and Mohammed Dahlan.

In 2006, Faraj unsuccessfully ran for a seat in the Palestinian Legislative Council.

On 31 October 2021, during a period of tension over the UAE's normalization with Israel in 2020, he visited Dubai to open the Palestinian pavilion at Expo 2020. where he delivered a message of peace. French magazine Intelligence Online described this as an attempt by Faraj to "press his case" for international backing for succeeding Abbas.

In August 2022, Israeli media outlet Channel 12 Faraj met with leaders of the Arab Israeli political coalition Joint List in order to convince them to join forces with the United Arab List to stop Benjamin Netanyahu from being re-elected in the 2022 legislative election, offering to serve as a mediator between the two parties. This led to a warning by the Shin Bet urging the PA not to interfere in Israel's elections.

In May 2024, it was reported that Faraj requested that the release of Marwan Barghouti be excluded from any Gaza war ceasefire deals, believing that Barghouti would threaten Abbas's rule.

In May 2026, Faraj was elected to the Central Committee of Fatah.

== Personal life ==
In 1985, he married Amal Faraj, a Fatah activist. He has three sons. His father, Ali, was shot and killed by Israeli soldiers in 2002 during a raid in Bethlehem.
