= Hani al-Hassan =

Palestinian politician (1938–2012)

- هاني الحسن

National Security Adviser
- In office 30 April 2003 – 27 June 2007
- President: Yasser Arafat; Rawhi Fattouh (acting); Mahmoud Abbas
- Prime Minister: Mahmoud Abbas; Ahmed Qurei; Nabil Shaath (acting); Ahmed Qurei; Ismail Haniyeh; Salam Fayyad
- Preceded by: Position established
- Succeeded by: Jibril Rajoub

Minister of Interior
- In office 29 October 2002 – 30 April 2003
- President: Yasser Arafat
- Preceded by: Abdel Razak al-Yehiyeh
- Succeeded by: Mahmoud Abbas

Member of the Palestinian National Council
- In office ?–?

Member of the Fatah Central Committee
- In office May 1980 – ?

Personal details
- Born: Hani al-Hassan; 1938 Ijzim, Mandatory Palestine
- Died: 6 July 2012 (aged 73–74) Amman, Jordan
- Resting place: Ramallah, Palestine
- Party: Fatah
- Relatives: Khaled al-Hassan (brother); Bilal al-Hassan (brother)
- Occupation: Politician, engineer

Hani al-Hassan (Arabic: هاني الحسن; 1938 – 6 July 2012), also known as Abu Tariq and Abu-l-Hasan, was a Palestinian politician and engineer who was a leader of the Fatah organization in Germany and member of the Palestinian Authority Cabinet and the Palestinian National Council.

== Early life ==
Al Hassan was born in a village, Ijzim, near Haifa Palestine, in 1938. He is one of the founding members of Fatah, the biggest faction of the PLO, and the first Palestinian ambassador to Iran, following the revolution. During the 1970s he led the indirect negotiations between the PLO and the United States. Although opposed to the Oslo agreement, al Hassan was appointed by Arafat as the Minister of Interior. Following the collapse of the Palestinian-Israeli negotiations at Camp David in 2000, Hani Al Hassan remained with Arafat and following the death of Arafat, Al Hassan accused Israel of killing Yasser Arafat. He originally studied engineering in the late 1950-60s where he organized an Islamist slate, Shabab al Aqsa, to compete in student elections. He joined the Muslim Brotherhood in early 1950s. West Germany (Darmstadt and Munich), where he worked through the General Union of Palestinian Students (GUPS) in Europe, and acted as Fatah's main Europe link after he merged his own commando group to Fatah in 1963 until 1967. He also served as President of GUPS from 1962. He is the younger brother of Khaled al-Hassan. He spent time as a refugee in Yarmouk camp, near Damascus,

== Political career ==
Al Hassan returned to Gaza in 1995 and began to act as the head of Foreign Relations in Fatah and a political adviser to Arafat. He served as regional head in Jordan briefly in early 1970, then as Salah Khalaf's deputy in Rasd, along with being a central committee leader during this time period. Beginning in 1974, he acted as a political aide to Yasser Arafat, an ambassador to Tehran, and became an ambassador to Amman in 1982. He retains good ties to the Gulf States. He became a member of Fatah-Central Committee in May 1980. He was critical of the leadership's stance towards Iraq after August 1991, and at Oslo, but returned to Gaza Strip in November 1995, and became the chief political adviser to Arafat as well as PLO-CC member & head of the Palestinian National Council foreign relations committee. He was appointed Interior Minister on 29 October 2002.

Mahmoud Abbas attempted to drop him from the PA cabinet, and despite Arafat's resistance, he was replaced in April 2003. He is slated to act as Arafat's national security adviser. Al Hassan was head of Fatah's Bureau of Mobilisation and Organisation and (maktab at-ta`bia wat-tandhim) until April 2007, when he was replaced in that role by Ahmed Qurei. Al Hassan went on to become a National Security Adviser but was dropped by Mahmoud Abbas on 27 June 2007, following his comments made on Al Jazeera.

Following Hamas' takeover of Gaza in June 2007, Hassan caused a major row in Fatah by giving an interview on Al-Jazeera in which he said that there had been no conflict between Hamas and Fatah but rather a conflict between loyal Palestinians in both camps and a small minority in Fatah who were preparing a coup to overthrow Hamas with American backing. He made it clear that he was referring essentially to the followers of Muhammad Dahlan. Hassan's statement was quickly rebutted by an official Fatah spokesman who portrayed Hassan as endorsing a Hamas coup.

== Death ==
Hassan died at a hospital in Amman on 6 July 2012 after a long illness. He was buried in Ramallah on 9 July.

== See also ==
- List of Fatah members

Political offices
Preceded by Abdel Razak al-Yehiyeh	Minister of Interior; 2002–2003	Succeeded by Mahmoud Abbas
