= Ghazi al-Jabali =

Palestinian police officer (born 1946)

Chief of the Preventive Security Service of Gaza Strip
- President: Yasser Arafat
- Succeeded by: Musa Arafat

Chief of Palestinian Civil Police Forces of Gaza Strip and West Bank
- Incumbent
- Assumed office October 2003
- President: Yasser Arafat

Personal details
- Born: 1946 (age 79–80) Jaffa Subdistrict
- Party: Fatah

Ghazi al-Jabali (born 1946) is a Palestinian police officer who served as Chief of the Preventive Security Service in the Gaza Strip, appointed by the Palestinian Authority. He previously served as commander of the Gaza police from the early 1990s, and held the rank of major general by the end of his tenure in the Palestinian security forces.

Since 1994 he has been the target of repeated attacks by Palestinian groups opposed to the Fatah-led Palestinian Authority, including gunfire aimed at his offices and a bomb that destroyed part of his house. He has also been the subject of a 1997 arrest warrant and extradition request from Israel, based on accusations that he ordered Palestinian police officers to attack an Israeli checkpoint in July 1997.

Al-Jabali was the target of protests after the shooting deaths of three Palestinian teenagers during clashes with police forces; demonstrators claimed that al-Jabali had given police officers orders to shoot protesters throwing stones during a Hamas organized demonstration in support of Osama bin Laden.

Al-Jabali resigned from his post as chief of police in Gaza in June 2002, during a security forces shake-up that also saw the dismissal of Colonel Jibril Rajoub and the resignation of Colonel Mohammed Dahlan. Along with his resignation he announced his intention to oppose Yaser Arafat as a candidate for president of the Palestinian Authority. He was appointed chief of Palestinian Civil Police Forces in both the Gaza Strip and the West Bank in October 2003.

A February 2004 gunfight Gaza police headquarters was construed by some officials as an attempt on al-Jabali's life. Other officials blamed violence on his rival Mohammad Dahlan members of the body he formerly commanded, Preventive Security Service.

Al-Jabali was criticised for corruption and curbing press freedoms, as well as the arrest of Eyad Sarraj, a civil rights activist.

On July 17, 2004, he was kidnapped at gunpoint by the Jenin Martyr's Brigade, part of the Popular Resistance Committees, who ambushed his convoy and wounded two bodyguards. Al-Jabali was only released after Palestinian President Yasser Arafat agreed to fire him. He was replaced with Arafat's cousin, Musa Arafat, a move which did little to restore public confidence in Police.
