= Mohammed Dahlan =

Palestinian politician (born 1961)

Mohammad Dahlan

Member of the Palestinian Legislative Council for Khan Yunis Governorate
- Incumbent
- Assumed office 18 February 2006

Minister of Civil Affairs
- In office 24 February 2005 – 29 March 2006
- President: Mahmoud Abbas
- Prime Minister: Ahmed Qurei; Nabil Shaath (acting); Ahmed Qurei
- Preceded by: Jamal Tarifi
- Succeeded by: Hussein al-Sheikh

Minister of State for Security Affairs
- In office 30 April 2003 – 7 October 2003
- President: Yasser Arafat
- Prime Minister: Mahmoud Abbas
- Preceded by: Office established
- Succeeded by: Office disestablished

Personal details
- Born: Mohammad Yusuf Dahlan; 29 September 1961 (age 65) Khan Yunis Camp, Egyptian-administered Gaza Strip, Palestine
- Citizenship: Montenegro (2012–present) Serbia (2013–present)
- Party: Fatah
- Spouse: Jaleela
- Children: 4
- Education: Islamic University of Gaza
- Website: Official website

Mohammad Yusuf Dahlan (Arabic: محمد دحلان, also known by the kunya Abu Fadi (أبو فادي), born 29 September 1961) is a Palestinian politician. Arrested by Israel for being involved with the Fatah Hawks—the Fatah youth movement—he subsequently helped in negotiations for the Oslo Accords, later becoming a critic of Yasser Arafat. The former leader of Fatah in the Gaza Strip, Dahlan's power there as head of the Preventive Security Force was at one time so substantial that the territory was nicknamed "Dahlanistan". Seen as a favorite by the George W. Bush administration to be Mahmoud Abbas' second-in-command, Dahlan was appointed by the latter to head the Palestinian National Security Council. An antagonist of Hamas, he participated in the Fatah–Hamas Mecca Agreement before his power began to decline after the latter gained the upper hand in the Battle of Gaza. He was elected to the Central Committee of Fatah amid allegations of fraud. Living in exile in Abu Dhabi, Dahlan has, according to Foreign Policy, had a hand in facilitating the Abraham Accords. During the Oslo period, he was described as having been the de facto ruler of the Gaza Strip, appointed by Yasser Arafat in 1994.

== Early life ==
Dahlan was born in Khan Yunis Refugee Camp, Khan Yunis, Gaza Strip to a refugee family from Hamama, a Palestinian town depopulated in 1948. He is the youngest of six children.

Dahlan became politically active as a teenager. In 1981, he helped to establish the Gaza branch of the Fatah youth movement Fatah Hawks in the Gaza Strip. Between 1981 and 1986, he was arrested by Israel 11 times for his leading role in the movement. During his time in prison, he learned to speak Hebrew fluently.

== Oslo years ==
Dahlan became involved in negotiating the Oslo Peace Agreement. He was chosen to head the Preventive Security Force in Gaza after the signing of the Oslo Accords. He built up a force of 20,000 men, making him one of the most powerful Palestinian leaders, dealing regularly with the Central Intelligence Agency, Israeli intelligence officials and many other Middle East intelligence agencies. His forces were accused of torturing Hamas detainees throughout the 1990s, allegations Dahlan denies. During this period Gaza was nicknamed "Dahlanistan" due to his power. His reputation was damaged in the Karni scandal of 1997 when it was revealed that Dahlan was diverting 40% of the taxes levied at the Karni Crossing (an estimated one million shekels a month) to his personal bank account.

== Second Intifada ==
In 2001 he upset Yasser Arafat by beginning to call for reform in the Palestinian National Authority (PA) and expressing dissatisfaction with a lack of coherent policy.

In 2002, he resigned his post as head of the Preventive Security in Gaza in the hope of becoming Interior Minister; this did not occur, and he was offered a post as security adviser but rejected it. In April 2003, he was appointed the Palestinian Minister of State for Security by Mahmoud Abbas, despite the objection of Arafat. By September he had been ousted when Abbas resigned as prime minister, and was replaced by Hakam Balawi.

Jibril Rajoub, with whom he cultivated a deep and personal rivalry, claimed in 2003 that everybody knew Dahlan was an Israeli agent. He has also been criticized for his good relationship with Arafat's long-time financial adviser Mohammad Rashid and Dahlan's own London-based business. Dahlan is alleged to have enriched himself through corruption; his personal wealth has been estimated at well over $120 million.

Others claim that, for the sake of deterring political rivals and counterweighting the numerous armed militias, he maintained a private army in the Gaza Strip in 2003 and 2004, which was trained and equipped by American services, with Israel intending to force a conflict between Dahlan's forces and Hamas.

Dahlan has also faced criticism regarding his role in Gaza turmoil, especially in exchanging hostilities with rival security forces commander Ghazi al-Jabali. In 2003, Preventive Security Force gunmen raided the offices of Jabali's General Security organization, going so far as to jam his head into his office toilet.

He repeatedly tried to campaign on a reform and anti-corruption ticket and tried to profile himself as an outspoken critic of Arafat, although many observers dispute his personal integrity. Nevertheless, Dahlan and his followers in internal Fatah elections won over most of the Fatah sections in Gaza.

In 2004, Dahlan was assumed to have been behind week-long unrest in Gaza following the appointment of Arafat's nephew Moussa Arafat as head of Gaza police forces. This appointment was considered by some a deliberate step to weaken Dahlan's position before the Israeli disengagement from the Gaza Strip and sparked massive protests.

== Gaza infighting ==
On January 26, 2006, Dahlan was narrowly elected to the Palestinian Legislative Council in the Palestinian legislative election of 2006 as a representative for Khan Yunis. Dahlan took a tough stance against Hamas, calling their election victory a disaster and threatening to 'haunt them from now till the end of their term' and to 'rough up and humiliate' Fatah supporters tempted to join the Hamas-led Palestinian government.

On December 14, 2006, gunmen attempted to assassinate Palestinian Prime Minister Ismail Haniyeh as he crossed Gaza's border with Egypt, killing a bodyguard and wounding five others, and sparking further clashes between Hamas and Fatah supporters in Gaza and the West Bank. Hamas accused Dahlan of orchestrating the attack. Dahlan rejected the accusations, saying, "the Hamas government is fully responsible for yesterday's events."

On January 7, 2007, Dahlan held the biggest-ever rally of Fatah supporters in the Gaza Strip, where he denounced Hamas as 'a bunch of murderers and thieves' and vowed that 'we will do everything, I repeat, everything, to protect Fatah activists'. In response Hamas labeled Dahlan a 'putschist' and accused him of bringing Palestinians to the brink of civil war.

Dahlan was a Fatah representative in negotiations which resulted in the Fatah–Hamas Mecca Agreement of February 8, 2007, in which both sides agreed to stop the military clashes in Gaza and form a government of national unity. In March 2007, despite objections from Hamas, Dahlan was appointed by Palestinian President Mahmoud Abbas to lead the newly re-established Palestinian National Security Council, overseeing all security forces in the Palestinian territories. Dahlan organised paramilitary units of several thousand fighters trained with American assistance in Arab countries, and lobbied Israel to allow Fatah forces in Gaza to receive large shipments of arms and ammunition to fight Hamas.

In the April 2008 edition of Vanity Fair it was revealed that after the 2006 elections Dahlan had been central in a U.S. plot to remove the democratically elected Hamas-led government from power. The Americans provided money and arms to Dahlan, trained his men and ordered him to carry out a military coup against Hamas in the Gaza Strip. However, the elected Hamas government forestalled the move and itself carried out an armed counter-coup.

== Battle of Gaza ==
In July 2007, Dahlan resigned from his post as national security adviser. The resignation was little more than a formality, since Mahmoud Abbas had issued a decree dissolving his national security council immediately after the Hamas takeover of Gaza. Dahlan has been blamed by many in Fatah for the rapid collapse of their forces in Gaza in the face of a Hamas offensive that lasted less than a week. During the fighting Dahlan's house on the coast of Gaza was seized by Hamas militants and subsequently demolished. He and most of the other senior security commanders of the Fatah-dominated PA security forces were not in Gaza during the fighting, leading to charges that their men had been abandoned in the field.

== Return to West Bank ==
Shortly after his forces were expelled from Gaza, Dahlan re-established himself in the West Bank. Tensions grew between his supporters and opponents when Fatah leader and former Interior Minister Hani al-Hassan gave an interview on Al-Jazeera in which he said what happened in Gaza was not a war between Fatah and Hamas; but between Hamas and Fatah collaborators who served the Americans and the Israelis, making clear that he was referring to Dahlan's supporters. Representatives of Dahlan pressured Mahmoud Abbas to fire and punish Al-Hassan, while masked gunmen opened fire on his home in Ramallah. Al-Hassan accused Dahlan of planning to murder him, a charge which Dahlan denied.

In October 2007 the George W. Bush administration reportedly exerted heavy pressure on Abbas to appoint Dahlan as his deputy. Some Fatah officials said that the U.S. and some European Union countries had made it clear they would like to see Dahlan succeed Abbas as head of the PA.

In August 2009 Dahlan was elected to the Central Committee of Fatah. However the results were controversial, with Fatah suffering mass resignations over claims the elections were fraudulent.

== Allegation of murdering Yasser Arafat ==
In June 2011 Dahlan was expelled from Fatah because of repeated claims by Mahmoud Abbas that he had murdered Arafat. In September, his house was raided by the Palestinian police and his private armed guards were arrested. In August 2011 his former party accused him of murdering Arafat using poison.

== Al-Mabhouh assassination ==
Hamas has claimed that two Palestinians arrested in Dubai for suspected involvement in the assassination of Mahmoud al-Mabhouh, Ahmad Hassanain and Anwar Shheibar, are former members of a death cell which carried out violent suppression of Hamas members, and work at a construction company in Dubai owned by Dahlan. A senior Hamas official told Al-Hayat newspaper that the two provided logistical aid to the Mossad hit team alleged to have carried out the assassination, renting them cars and hotel rooms. Dahlan denied the charges."

== Trial in absentia ==
In December 2014, a trial against Dahlan on corruption charges began in Ramallah. Since he failed to appear for the trial, it was decided to try him in absentia. He was convicted for defaming president Abbas and sentenced him to two years in prison, and a year later convicted of embezzlement which added three years to his sentence.

== Influence in the United Arab Emirates ==
Following his expulsion from Fatah in 2011, Dahlan moved to the United Arab Emirates (UAE), where he worked as a security adviser. Dahlan developed a close relationship with Crown Prince Mohamed bin Zayed Al Nahyan, who became the de facto ruler of Abu Dhabi in 2014 and President of the United Arab Emirates in 2022.

Dahlan assisted in organising some large UAE investments in the Balkans, and acquired Serbian citizenship.

In 2016, Turkey placed Dahlan on its the "most wanted terrorist list", offering a $700,000 bounty, accusing him of involvement in the failed 2016 Turkish coup attempt.

In October 2018, Dahlan was accused of cooperating with Abraham Golan, a Hungarian-Israeli veteran of the French Foreign Legion, to hire American ex-special forces mercenaries to assassinate Yemeni al-Islah politicians as part of the United Arab Emirate's role in the Yemeni Civil War.

Dahlan was the target of a bounty offered by the Turkish government in January 2020, offering 4 million lira (US$700,000) for information leading to his capture. The Turkish government of Recep Tayyip Erdogan accuses Dahlan of being an agent of Israeli intelligence and a financial backer of the Gülen movement.

Foreign Policy reported that Dahlan was influential in developing the Abraham Accords, the U.S. brokered agreements on Arab–Israeli normalization signed between Israel and the UAE and Bahrain in 2020. In 2020, U.S. Ambassador to Israel David M. Friedman said in an interview that the U.S. considers Dahlan as a future replacement for Palestinian President Abbas.

Acting Prime Minister of PA, Nabil Shaath, said that Dahlan "played a crucial role in shaping the deal" of the Israel–United Arab Emirates peace agreement, which was denounced by the PA. Shaath accused him of "neglecting the interests of his homeland". Dahlan was also branded as a "traitor" in the street protests of West Bank and Gaza Strip, where demonstrators trampled and torched the portraits of Donald Trump, Mohammed bin Zayed, Benjamin Netanyahu and Dahlan.

Dahlan led one of the candidate lists, Al-Mustaqbal (lit. 'The Future'), for the planned 2021 Palestinian general election, though he himself did not stand in the election. However President Abbas indefinitely postponed this election a month before the planned date.

In March 2023, Dahlan argued that Israel had destroyed the option of a two-state solution, and Palestinians should now work toward a one-state solution for two peoples with equal rights. He said in an interview "We, as Palestinians, must realise that the two-state solution has completely ended, and is no longer feasible on the ground because of the Israeli inflexibility and due to the measures that Israel has taken over the past 30 years."

== 2023 Gaza war and subsequent peace plan ==
Three weeks into the Gaza war, he gave an interview to the Economist. He suggested that after the war a two-year transitional technocratic government should be created for Gaza and the West Bank jointly. After that, elections with all Palestinian political factions standing, including Hamas, should take place for a parliamentary system of government, without a president. This Palestinian state should be internationally recognised.

The Daily Telegraph reported that sources knowledgable of the Gaza peace plan negotiations in 2026 said that Dahlan played a crucial role negotiating the plan. He was said to have helped convince Hamas that only through disarmament could its political future be secured, assisted by pressure from Egypt and the forthcoming possible September 2027 Palestinian West Bank elections.

== Personal life ==
Dahlan married Jaleela (born in Saudi Arabia on 1 January 1966). They have four children: Fadi (born Tunis, 5 October 1990); Firaz (born Tunis, 8 August 1992); Hadil (born Gaza, 19 October 1995); and Asil (born Gaza, 25 September 2003). All six gained Serbian citizenship together on 6 December 2013. Dahlan also holds Montenegrin citizenship since 2012. Dahlan lives in exile in Abu Dhabi, where he "works closely" with the ruling Al Nahyan family. He is also aligned with Egyptian President Abdel Fattah el-Sisi.

== Sources ==
- Dahlan, Mohammad: European Institute for Research on Mediterranean and Euro-Arab Cooperation
- Profile: Mohammad Dahlan. BBC News/Middle East
- EI: Who is Mohammad Dahlan
- EI: Civil War in Palestine?

Political offices
New office	Minister of State for Security Affairs; 2003	Office abolished
Preceded by Jamal Tarifi	Minister of Civil Affairs; 2005–2006	Succeeded by Hussein al-Sheikh
