= Mamdouh Saidam =

Palestinian Fatah member (1937–1971)

- Born: Mamdouh Sabri Saidam; 1940; Aqir, Ramla, Mandatory Palestine
- Died: 24 July 1971 (aged 30–31); Damascus, Syria
- Burial place: Martyrs' Cemetery Yarmouk camp, Damascus, Syria
- Education: Alexandria University
- Political party: Fatah
- Spouse: Jamila Saidam
- Children: Sabri Saidam

Mamdouh Saidam (1940–1971) was a member of the Fatah who held several posts in the group and in the Palestine Liberation Organization (PLO). He was one of the military commanders of the Fatah.

== Early life and education ==
Saidam was born in a village, Aqir, near Ramla, in 1940. The family was forced to leave their home in 1948 when the Zionist forces invaded the village. They settled in Majdal for a while and then began to live in a refugee camp in Nuseirat near the Gaza Strip.

After completing his education in Gaza and Egypt Saidam received a degree in geography from Alexandria University, Egypt, in 1963.

== Career and activities ==
Following his graduation Saidam was employed as a teacher in Algeria. He joined the Fatah in 1965 becoming one of its second-wave members. He headed the Cultural Department at the PLO Office in Algeria. He was trained as a military leader at Cherchell College in Algeria and also, in China. He was appointed deputy head of military arm of Fateh named Al-'asifa. He was also made a member of the Central Committee of Fatah. He was the head of the Palestinian resistance operations in Palestine in the late 1960s. Saidam was commander of the Palestinian forces in the Battle of Karameh in 1968. He was in charge of Fateh forces in Amman until 1970.

== Personal life and death ==
Saidam was married to Jamila, a member of the Palestinian Legislative Council. Their son, Sabri, has held various posts in the Palestinian government and is a Fatah member. Mamdouh Saidam died of cancer in Damascus on 24 July 1971. He was buried at the martyrs' cemetery in the Yarmouk camp, Damascus.

== Legacy ==
A sport hall was named in memory of him, Martyr Mamdouh Saidam Sports Hall, at Al Istiqlal University, Jericho, West Bank.

== See also ==
- List of Fatah members
