= Central Committee of Fatah =

Upper House Legislature of Fatah

Central Committee of Fatah اللجنة المركزية لحركة فتح al-Lajnah al-Markazīyah li-Ḥarakat Fatḥ
- 2026 Central Committee

Type
- Houses: Upper body Central Committee of Fatah; Advisory body Advisory Council of Fatah; Lower body Fatah Revolutionary Council
- Seats: 18

Elections
- Last election: 2026
- Next election: TBD

The Fatah Central Committee is the highest decision-making body of the Palestinian organization and political party, Fatah.

== History ==
The first Fatah Central Committee was formed in February 1963, consisting of ten members, including Yasser Arafat, Khalil al-Wazir, Salah Khalaf, and Khaled al-Hassan. Arafat and al-Wazir, who lobbied for increased personal responsibility, primarily faced opposition from al-Hassan who opposed premature military action against Israel which the former two advocated.

The establishment of the Palestine Liberation Organization (PLO) in 1964 severely undermined Fatah, with 80% of its members joining the PLO's armed wing, the Palestinian Liberation Army. With this, Arafat and al-Wazir convinced the central committee to allow military operations. As a result, al-Assifa was formed as Fatah's armed wing, but Arafat's rival Abu Youssef was appointed its leader. In 1965, Arafat was chosen to replace him, but eventually began facing opposition from the central committee. Al-Hassan led the committee to cut funds to al-Assifa in an attempt to reduce its operations, but Arafat decided to relocate to Damascus, Syria where he received financial aid from Palestinians working abroad.

In the 1989 Fatah Conference, 18 Fatah members were elected to the committee, with Arafat as the secretary-general. Following Arafat's signing of the Oslo Accords in 1993, only half of the central committee became leading members in the newly established Palestinian National Authority. The rest of the committee either resigned or became inactive. Although now he had overwhelming support from the central committee, Arafat decided to restructure it to further strengthen his authority in the Palestinian territories. He convened a conference in Gaza in October 1995, in which he added to the committee "insiders" Zakaria al-Agha and Faisal Husseini. In November, the committee set up councils to organize campaigns for the Palestinian Legislative Council (PLC) elections and threatened to expel any Fatah member who ran as an independent.

Elections for the central committee were held on July 8, 2009, with 96 candidates competing for spots. Mahmoud Abbas was elected as chairman, and an additional three seats were added to the committee.

== Members of the Central Committee of Fatah ==
#	Conference	Year	Location	Number of members
1	First	1961	Damascus	11
2	Second	1968	Zabadani	9
3	Third	1971	Damascus	12
4	Fourth	1980	Damascus	15
5	Fifth	1988	Tunis	22
6	Sixth	2009	Bethlehem	24
7	Seventh	2016	Ramallah	19
8	Eighth	2026	Ramallah	19

=== First Conference ===
It was held in Damascus in late 1964, and the Central Committee consisted of:

- Yasser Arafat
- Khalil al-Wazir
- Adel Abdel Karim Yassin
- Salah Khalaf
- Farouk Qaddoumi
- Mahmoud Abbas
- Abu Ali Iyad
- Abu Yusuf al-Najjar
- Mamdouh Saidam
- Mukhtar Ba'ba'
- Mahmoud Massouda

On 12 June 1967, additional members were elected to the committee, including Khaled al-Hassan and Abdel Fattah Hammoud.

=== Second Conference ===
It was held in Zabadani in July 1968, and consisted of 9 members:

- Yasser Arafat
- Khalil al-Wazir
- Salah Khalaf
- Farouk Qaddoumi
- Mahmoud Abbas
- Khaled al-Hassan
- Abu Ali Iyad
- Abu Yusuf al-Najjar
- Mamdouh Saidam

=== Third Conference ===
It was held in Damascus in September 1971, and the Central Committee consisted of 12 members:

- Yasser Arafat
- Khalil al-Wazir
- Salah Khalaf
- Farouk Qaddoumi
- Mahmoud Abbas
- Khaled al-Hassan
- Abu Yusuf al-Najjar
- Kamal Adwan
- Nimr Saleh
- Muhammad Rateb Ghneim
- Hayel Abdel Hamid
- Salim al-Zaanoun

=== Fourth Conference ===
It was held in Damascus in May 1980, and consisted of 15 members:

- Yasser Arafat
- Khalil al-Wazir
- Salah Khalaf
- Farouk Qaddoumi
- Mahmoud Abbas
- Khaled al-Hassan
- Nimr Saleh
- Muhammad Rateb Ghneim
- Hayel Abdel Hamid
- Salim al-Zaanoun
- Saad Sayel
- Rafiq Natsheh
- Hani al-Hassan
- Majed Abu Sharar
- Samih Abu Kweik

=== Fifth Conference ===
It was held in Tunis in August 1988, and the Central Committee consisted of 22 members, to which two additional members were later added following the assassination of Salah Khalaf and Hayel Abdel Hamid in 1991:

- Yasser Arafat
- Salah Khalaf
- Farouk Qaddoumi
- Mahmoud Abbas
- Khaled al-Hassan
- Muhammad Rateb Ghneim
- Hayel Abdel Hamid
- Salim al-Zaanoun
- Saad Sayel
- Rafiq Natsheh
- Hani al-Hassan
- Yahya Habash
- Muhammad Jihad al-Amouri
- Nasr Yusuf
- Tayeb Abdel Rahim
- Intisar al-Wazir
- Hakam Balawi
- Abbas Zaki
- Ahmed Qurei
- Subhi Abu Karsh
- Abdullah al-Ifrangi
- Nabil Shaath
- Faisal Husseini
- Zakaria al-Agha

=== Sixth Conference ===
It was held in Bethlehem in August 2009, and consisted of 24 members:

- Mahmoud Abbas
- Muhammad Rateb Ghneim
- Mahmoud al-Aloul
- Marwan Barghouti
- Nasser al-Qudwa
- Salim al-Zaanoun
- Jibril Rajoub
- Tawfiq Tirawi
- Saeb Erekat
- Uthman Abu Gharbieh
- Mohammed Dahlan
- Mohammad al-Madani
- Jamal Muhaisen
- Hussein al-Sheikh
- Azzam al-Ahmad
- Sultan Abu al-Einein
- Tayeb Abdel Rahim
- Abbas Zaki
- Nabil Shaath
- Mohammad Shtayyeh
- Nabil Abu Rudeineh
- Zakaria al-Agha
- Sakher Bsiso
- Amal Hamad

=== Seventh Conference ===
It was held at the Palestinian Presidential Headquarters in Al-Bireh in 2016:

- Mahmoud Abbas
- Marwan Barghouti
- Jibril Rajoub
- Mohammad Shtayyeh
- Hussein al-Sheikh
- Mahmoud al-Aloul
- Tawfiq Tirawi
- Saeb Erekat
- Ismail Jaber
- Jamal Muhaisen
- Nasser al-Qudwa
- Ahmed Helles
- Mohammad al-Madani
- Sabri Saidam
- Samir al-Rifai
- Azzam al-Ahmad
- Abbas Zaki
- Rawhi Fattouh
- Dalal Salameh

=== Eighth Conference ===
It was held across four locations: the Palestinian Presidential Headquarters in Al-Bireh, Beirut, Cairo, and Gaza in May 2026:

- Mahmoud Abbas
- Marwan Barghouti
- Majed Faraj
- Jibril Rajoub
- Hussein al-Sheikh
- Leila Ghannam
- Mahmoud Aloul
- Tawfiq Tirawi
- Yasser Abbas
- Tayseer al-Bardini
- Zakaria Zubeidi
- Ahmed Abu Holi
- Ahmed Helles
- Adnan Ghaith
- Mousa Abu Zaid
- Dalal Salameh
- Mohammad al-Madani
- Iyad Safi
- Mohammad Shtayyeh

== Bibliography ==
- Atkins, Stephen. Encyclopedia of National Movements.
- Rubin, Barry. Transformation of Palestinian Politics.
