= Abu Maher Ghneim =

Palestinian politician

Muhammad Ghneim Kunya: 'Abū Maher
- محمد "أبو ماهر" راتب غنيم

Member of the Fatah Central Committee
- In office ?–?

Deputy to the Palestinian President
- In office ?–?

Personal details
- Born: 1937 (age 88–89) Jerusalem, Palestine
- Party: Fatah
- Occupation: Politician, Trade Union Activist

Muhammad "Abu Maher" Ghneim (Arabic: محمد "أبو ماهر" راتب غنيم; born 1937) is a Palestinian politician and a senior Fatah official, being a member of the organization's central committee.

== Biography ==
Ghneim was born in Jerusalem in 1937 and was involved in trade union activism in his youth. Along with thousands of other Palestinians, he was expelled from the city during the 1948 Arab-Israeli War. Ghneim became involved in Palestinian politics, becoming a founding member of Fatah in 1957. He also participated in the founding of the Palestine Liberation Organization (PLO) in 1964. For much of this period, he fought against Israel alongside Yasser Arafat in Lebanon. Receiving military training from the People's Republic of China, Ghneim became a commander of Fatah's official armed wing al-Assifa ("the Storm"). Following the PLO's departure from Lebanon in the early 1980s, Ghneim moved to Tunisia with much of the Palestinian leadership.

Ghneim opposed the 1993 Oslo Peace Accords signed by Arafat, and refused to return to the Palestine until all of its territory was "liberated," i.e. including modern-day Israel. He had remained in exile in Tunisia, but returned to the West Bank on July 29, 2009, to attend the Fatah General Conference in Bethlehem in August 2009 and was elected as a member of its Central Committee. Palestinian president Mahmoud Abbas reportedly convinced Israeli authorities to allow Ghneim to enter the Palestinian territories and permanently live there. He was greeted by Abbas and hundreds of Fatah activists in Ramallah. His return signified a change in Fatah politics, with Ghneim bolstering Abbas's position against rival Fatah leader Farouk Qaddoumi who remains in exile. After his return, he acquired a role as one of Abbas' deputies.
