= Saad Sayel =

Palestinian commander

Brigadier General Saad Sayel
- Born: 30 September 1932; Nablus, Mandatory Palestine
- Died: 29 September 1982 (aged 49); Mowasat Hospital, Damascus, Syria
- Cause of death: Assassinated by Abu Nidal Organization in Lebanon, near Syria border
- Burial place: Al Shohada tomb of Yarmouk Camp, south of Damascus, Syria
- Other name: As a guerrilla commander he was known by his code name: Salman Abu al-Waleed
- Occupations: Head of the Fatah security apparatus; Director of the Central Operations Committee of the Palestinian Revolutionary Forces; Member of the Palestinian National Council

Notes
- He was known as Marshal of the Revolution and Marshal of the Beirut.

Saad Sayel (Arabic: سعد صایل; 30 September 1932 – 29 September 1982) was a Palestinian commander and former Jordanian army officer who served as head of the Fatah security apparatus. and founder of the Yarmouk Brigade. He played a prominent role in rebuilding the PLO's military apparatus and training troops alongside Yasser Arafat, Khalil al-Wazir, Muhammad Youssef al-Najjar and others.

== Life and career ==
Sayel was born in the Kafr Ghalil village located in the eastern foot of Mount Gerizim, "Jabal et Tur" one of the mountains of Nablus. He spent his elementary and secondary education there. He traveled to Jordan as a teenager and joined the army there. In 1951, Saad Sayel went to the Jordanian Military College to receive specialized military training and after military training, he was assigned to the command of the Husain ibn Ali infantry brigade with Colonel rank.

He spent the military engineering course (Bridge Design and Classification Engineering) in England in 1954. Also he spent the bridge design course in Iraq in 1958 and the military engineering course in England again in 1959. In 1960, after passing advanced military engineering in the United States, he underwent further training at the United States Army Command and General Staff College at Fort Leavenworth. In 1965, he spent the air defense course in Egypt. Also, he went through special courses in the Soviet Union.

Sayel served as a soldier in the Jordanian army, but in the 1970 Jordan-PLO conflict between the monarchy and the fedayeen, he opted to join and support Fatah. Because of his military experience, he established the Yarmouk Brigade, which played an active role in Lebanon and Palestine later. It was an attempt to professionalize the Palestinian military.

When Sayel joined the Palestinian National Liberation Movement Fatah, he was assigned to important military positions. For example, he appointed as director of the Central Operations Authority of the Palestinian Revolutionary Forces, a member of the General Command of the storm forces and a member of the leadership of the Occupied territory after being promoted to the rank of brigadier. In 1978, he led the Fatah forces against the Israeli invasion in Lebanon.

Also, he was a selected member of the Palestinian National Council and elected to the Central Committee of the Fatah Movement in its conference held in Damascus in 1980. Abu al Waleed participated in the management of the military operations of the Palestinian revolutionary forces in their confrontation with the Israeli forces in Lebanon and get the title of Marshal of the Beirut because of his braveries.

In 1980, he became a member of the Central Committee of Fatah movement and led the Central Operations and Command Room of the Lebanese Joint Forces Palestine. In June 1982, after the Israeli forces besieged Beirut, Saad Sayel was the leading Fatah commander along with Yasser Arafat and Khalil Wazir. That is why it became known as the "Marshal of the Revolution" among the resistance forces.

In spite of a grim and quiet personality, Sayel was widely respected as a tough and influential commander.

== Memorials ==
- A military garrison at east of Khan Yunis in the Gaza Strip, is named Saad Sayel after his death.
- Raymonda Tawil, the famous Palestinian author, has mentioned the role of Saad Sayel in his book, "A bunch of roses to them".

== Death ==
He was assassinated by the Abu Nidal Organization in Lebanon, near Syria border on 29 September 1982.

He had gone to Beqaa Valley to visit the Popular Front and the Lebanese Joint Forces. Then he went to the hospital there for visiting someone and continued his way to Baalbek. After passing through the city Riyaq, near the Syria border, Between Talia and Safri villages, about 500 meters to the Syrian army checkpoint, a number of armed forces who had already lurked in the area fired on three Benz and Jeep escorts carrying Saad Sayel. The driver was killed on the spot and Saad Sayel was injured by a bullet.

An hour later, he was taken by ambulance to the Mowasat hospital in Damascus, where he died at 11pm from severe bleeding and cardiac arrest.

At the next day, his body was carried on the shoulder of his comrades in Damascus and buried in the al-Shohada tomb of the Yarmouk Palestinian Refugee camp.

Some sources reported that Israeli intelligence agency Mossad intended to assassinate Palestinian commanders remaining in Lebanon. Saad Sayel (Abu al-Waleed) was at the top of these assassinations list.

== Demolition of the Saad Sayel's grave by ISIL ==
In 2015, ISIL terrorists captured the Yarmouk camp and destroyed the al-Shohada tomb in the first act. They destroyed the graves of the Palestinian revolution martyrs who had been buried there for 65 years, including Fathi Shaqaqi, Saad Sayel, Khalil al-Wazir and Zuheir Mohsen, in pretext of confronting the manifestations of disbelief.

While condemning these ugly acts contrary to the religious principles and customs, the Saad Sayel's family called on all Syrian freedom fighters to take revenge for this heinous crime against the ISIS terrorist group.

The Sayel's family also called on the Palestinian authorities to do its utmost to move the bodies of the martyrs from the Yarmouk camp to Palestine, as this is one of the rights of martyrs' families.

Also, Ezzat al-Rashq one of the Hamas leaders, in response to this event announced: We strongly condemn the demolition of al-Shehda's tomb and the grave of two Palestinian martyrs "Khalil al-Wazir" and "Saad Sayel".

== See also ==
- List of Fatah members
- Israeli–Palestinian conflict
- List of political parties in the Palestinian National Authority
- Palestinian political violence
- List of Palestinians
- Zuheir Mohsen
- Fathi Shaqaqi
