= Majed Abu Sharar =

Palestinian political leader

Majid Abusharar
- ماجد أبو شرار
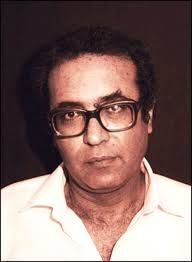
- Born: 1936; Dura, Palestine
- Died: 9 October 1981 (aged 44–45); Rome, Italy
- Resting place: Beirut, Lebanon
- Education: Alexandria University in Law
- Occupations: Author, Human rights activist, journalist, and politician
- Children: Samaa Abusharar, Salam Abusharar, and Dalia Abusharar
- Writing career
- Language: Arabic
- Notable work: Bitter Bread
- Literary movement: PLO and Fateh

Majid Abu Sharar (1936–9 October 1981) was a Palestinian writer, activist, journalist, and politician. He wrote Bitter Bread. He was assassinated on 9 October 1981 after a bomb was planted by Mossad agents in his hotel in Rome.

== Early life ==
He was born in 1936 to Mohammed Abusharar and Fatima Al-Sharif in Dura. He moved to Gaza because of his father's work as a judge, as well as his father joining the Holy Jihad Army during the 1940s. Majid received his primary and preparatory education in Gaza. He later earned a law degree from Alexandria University in 1958, before returning to his hometown in Dura.

== Career ==
Shortly after, Abu Sharar moved to Jordan and worked as a teacher and principal in Karak District School. In 1959, he became an editor of Al-Ayyam in Saudi Arabia. He was also socialist in his political ideals and was fairly open about such in his works. He joined Fatah in 1962 and was active in its administration. In 1964, he wrote a collection of stories called Bitter Bread, with the notable included stories being "Water Snakes" and "Bitter Bread". In the same year, he was married and had a child. Following the Six-Day War, he moved to Jordan and continued to work in Fatah's media department under Kamal Adwan. Following the Fardan Operation, he joined the Palestinian National Council. He was Political Commissar for Fatah from 1973 to 1978. He prepared guerilla forces and drew up lines for plans. In 1977, he was remarried and had two more children. He later served as a secretary general of the Fatah Revolutionary Council and Secretary of the Revolutionary Council. Shortly after the assassination of Adwan, he became the director of the Palestinian Cinema and Photography Organization and in charge of the media and operations department of the PLO. He also became an active member of several Palestinian writer and journalist groups and provided ground for different Palestinian parties and militias to negotiate. Abu Sharar was replaced by Ahmad Abdel Rahman as the director of the Palestinian Cinema and Photography Organization in 1981.

== Political Positions ==
Majid Abusharar was a staunch member of the Democratic Left, becoming the Fatah Political Commissar and forming socialist communities. His political policies were to not recognize, negotiate, or stop fighting with Israel. In May 1980, he was elected as a member of the Fatah Central Committee.

As a result of the massive popularity of the Democratic Left, he helped form The Students Battalion. In 1980, he attempted to unite his ranks under one movement and succeeded in uniting the movement. He later wrote Bitter Bread, a collection of his own short political short stories, and also wrote a satire article called "Jedda" in the Fatah Newspaper. He was also prominent in the General Union of Palestinian Writers and Authors.

== Assassination ==
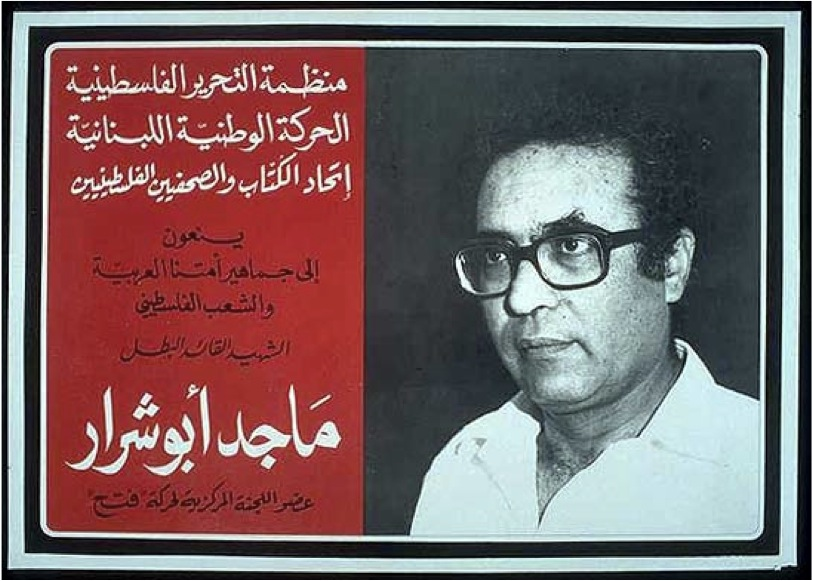
Poster announcing the death of Majid Abusharar, it reads: "The PLO and General Union of Palestinian Writers and Authors sadly announces the death of Majid Abusharar."

He went on a visit to Rome for a Palestinian solidarity meeting under the name Abbas Zaytouni with an Algerian passport. He attended the conference with Hilarion Capucci, Vanessa Redgrave, and Roger Garaudy and on the evening of 9 October 1981, he was killed by an explosion by a bomb planted underneath his bed that occurred in Flora Hotel by Mossad agents. He was buried in Beirut in the Palestinian Martyr's Cemetery by his family due to him residing there before his death. Authorities originally assumed that he was assembling the bomb but the theory was later disproved following autopsy reports and several investigations. There had been claims that Al Assifa but due to the professionalism of the plan and the leader of Al Assifa being contacted and denying such it was disregarded and Mossad was held responsible.

== Aftermath ==
Following his death, his family was notified and travelled to Beirut to bury him. A general disruption within his hometown in Dura and Palestine ensued as people were seen wearing black to pay respects. His official funeral would be held in Beirut. His funeral was attended by his family and band members. He would be buried in the Palestinian Martyr's Cemetery. Mahmoud Darwish wrote of him within one of his books "In the Presence of Absence" and the Majid Abusharar Media Foundation would be opened to perpetuate his name. In 2012, A Palestinian artist known as Youssef Katlo erected a 10 meter long and three meter wide mural in his honor of Majid in front of the entrance to Dora International.

== See also ==
- List of Fatah members
