= Nimr Saleh =

Palestinian leftist figure (1929–1991)

- Born: Mohammad Nimr Saleh; 1929; Lubya, Mandatory Palestine
- Died: September 1991 (aged 61–62)
- Years active: 1960s–1980s
- Political party: Fatah (until 1983)

Nimr Saleh (Arabic: نمر صالح; 1929–1991), also known as Abu Saleh, was a Palestinian leftist figure who was a member of the Fatah. He was dismissed from the Fatah Central Committee in 1983 due to his opposition and involvement in Fatah uprising.

== Early life ==
Saleh was born in Lubya, Mandatory Palestine, in 1929. The family moved to Qula, Lydda, in 1948 following the nakba.

== Career and activities ==
Salehjoined the Fatah becoming one of its second-wave members. He was named as a member of its High Central Command in 1965. He was tasked to head the Fatah militia in Jordan, but he was soon fired from the post because of his attempts to have a personal power base among the militia. He became a member of the Central Committee of Fatah in September 1971. After this he adopted a leftist leaning and began to support the Soviet Union from October 1973. He acted as the Palestine Liberation Organization's (PLO) liaison with the Lebanese leftist groups which he supplied arms.

Saleh was part of the anti-Syrian group within the Fatah which started an extensive attack against Maronite strongholds in the early 1976. However, he would change his camp later being one of the Syrian supporters. His new approach was first clearly seen in the Fourth Congress of Fatah in Damascus, Syria, in May 1980. In the same Congress Saleh was reelected as a member of the Central Committee of Fatah.

Saleh was a supporter of the Soviet intervention in Afghanistan in 1979 and rejected the peace plans suggested by the Saudi Crown Prince Fahd in 1981 and the American President Ronald Reagan in 1982. Saleh was a frequent visitor of Moscow where he was highly praised. After being backed by Syria Saleh declared his opposition against Yasser Arafat, the chairman of the PLO, in November 1982. He cited the Fez declaration which proposed another peace plan and Fatah's cooperation with Jordan as the reasons for his opposition.

Saleh and other critics of Yasser Arafat openly expressed their disagreement in the Fatah Revolutionary Council meeting in January 1983. His membership in the Fatah Central Committee ended after the meeting, and his frequent absences from the meetings were cited as the reason for his dismissal from the council. He was also removed from the Fatah list for the Palestinian National Council.

Saleh then began to support the rebellion against the PLO led by Said Muragha and became one of the leading rebel figures. He argued in an interview with the Syrian daily Tishreen in July 1983 that they were planning to "dismember and rebuild Fatah on the basis of the movement's political programme." He also added in the same interview that they had a strong alliance with the Syria's ruling party, the Arab Socialist Baath Party. The Soviet authorities had to adopt a vague position towards Yasser Arafat and the PLO due to Saleh's open revolt.

== Later years and death ==
However, later Saleh also had problems with the Fatah dissidents and was arrested by the Syrian authorities in Damascus. He was put under house arrest in June 1984. He died of a heart attack in September 1991.

== See also ==
- List of Fatah members
