= Abdullah Franji =

Palestinian politician (born 1943)

- عبد الله فرانجي
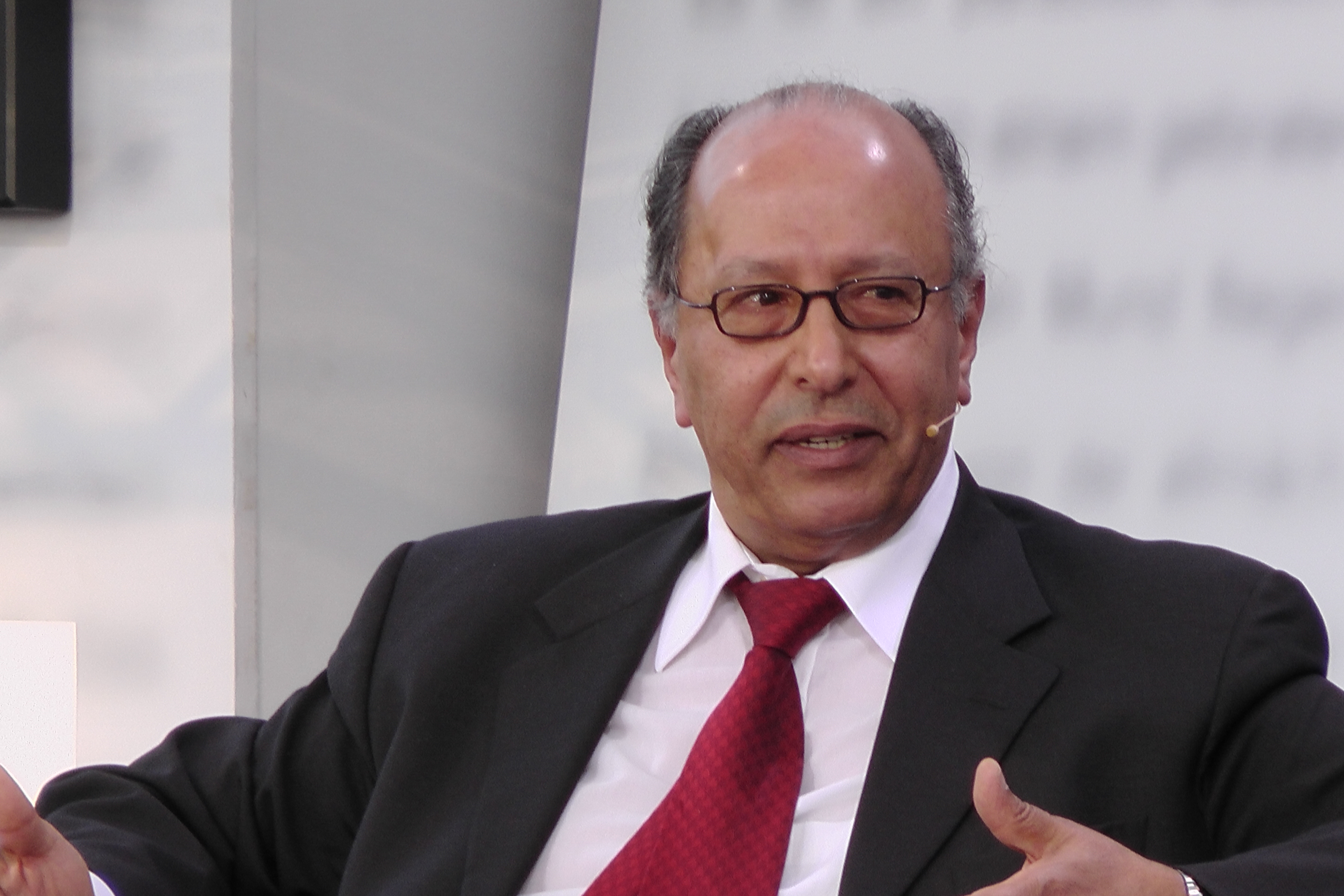

Personal details
- Born: 15 November 1943 (age 82) Beersheba, Mandatory Palestine
- Party: Fatah
- Website: al-frangi.de

Abdullah Franji (Arabic: عبد الله فرانجي) also known as Abdullah Frangi, (born 1943) is a Fatah member and one of its leaders in Gaza. He has held various posts in the Palestine Liberation Organization (PLO) and Palestine National Authority.

== Early life and education ==
Franji was born in Beersheba, Mandate Palestine, on 15 November 1943. His family left the city during the Nakba in 1948 and settled in Gaza. They later settled in Cairo in 1956 during the Suez crisis.

Franji obtained degrees in medicine and in politics in Germany between 1963 and 1973. He joined the Fatah during his studies in the mid-1960s. He received military training in Algeria in 1967. He was arrested in Hebron after his return to the region and left Palestine for Germany when he was released from prison. He is one of the co-founders of the General Union of Palestinian Students and Workers in Europe and served as the president of the Confederation of Palestinian Students in Germany and Austria from 1968 to 1973. Following the opening of the PLO information office in Frankfurt he was involved in the publication of the Resistentia magazine which was a PLO propaganda publication.

Franji was hospitalized after he and Eli Lobel, a member of the Israeli dissident group Matzpen, were attacked and injured in an event organized by the Socialist German Student Union to protest the talk of the Israeli ambassador to West Germany Asher Ben-Natan in the summer of 1969. The perpetrators of the attack were Zionists. Franji was elected as a member of the Palestinian National Council in 1972. After the killing of the Israeli Olympic athletes in September 1972 he and some 300 other Palestinians were expelled from Germany.

== Career and activities ==
Following his graduation Franji served at the Arab League office in Bonn, Germany, in the mid-1970s. He was instrumental in the establishment of the Palestine Information Office in Bonn which was the unofficial representative of the PLO. He became a member of the Fatah Revolutionary Council in 1978 and headed the PLO delegation to Austria in 1982. He served as the permanent PLO representative to United Nations Industrial Development Organization in Vienna between 1982 and 1985.

Franji was elected to the Central Committee of Fatah in August 1989 and became one of the advisers on European affairs to the PLO leader Yasser Arafat. Franji was made the head of the PLO delegation to Germany in 1993 which he held until 1998 and became a member of the Palestinian Central Council in 1998.

Franji headed the Palestine Future Foundation in May–June 2007. He was appointed adviser on foreign affairs to Mahmoud Abbas, president of the Palestinian National Authority, in 2010 with the rank of minister. He was named as the governor of Gaza in 2014. He serves as the Fatah representative in Gaza.

== Views ==
Franji stated in an interview with Der Spiegel in 2006 that the relations between Fatah and Hamas would be better after the recognition of the two-state solution by Hamas. However, two years later he argued that Hamas was responsible for the end of ceasefire in 2007.

Franji published a book entitled The PLO and Palestine in 1983.
