= Khaled al-Hassan =

Palestinian advisor

- خالد الحسن
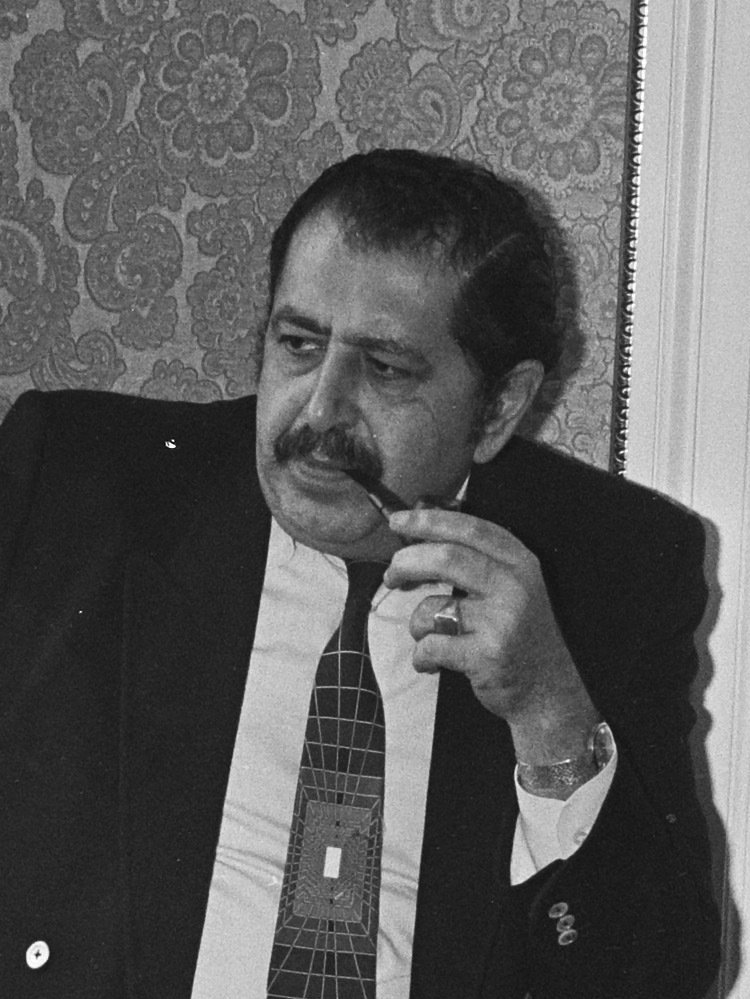

Palestine Liberation Organization Executive Committee
- In office 1968–1994

Chairman of the Foreign Relations Committee of the Palestinian National Council
- In office 1973–1994

Personal details
- Born: 13 February 1928 Haifa, Palestine
- Died: 8 October 1994 (aged 66) Rabat, Morocco
- Party: Fatah

Khaled al-Hassan (Arabic: خالد الحسن also known as Abu Said Arabic: أبو السعيد) (13 February 1928 – 8 October 1994) was an early adviser of Yasser Arafat, PLO leader and a co-founder of the Palestinian political and militant organization Fatah. He lived most of his life in Kuwait, where he was granted Kuwaiti citizenship in the 1950s, leaving the country in 1990 during the Gulf War as part of the wave of expulsion of Palestinians from Kuwait. Khaled was the older brother of Hani al-Hassan.

== Early life ==
Khaled Al-Hassan was born in Haifa on February 13, 1928. He and his family lived there until Israel's capture of the city in the 1948 Arab-Israeli War, in which he participated as part of the Palestinian Arab forces. His family settled in Sidon, Lebanon, but he left for Egypt where he says he was briefly detained "just for being Palestinian." Upon his release, he reunited with his family in Lebanon and lived there for a while.

In 1949 he formed the short-lived commando group Tahrir Filastin. A year later he moved to Syria. During this time, al-Hassan worked as a teacher in Damascus and helped found the Islamic Liberation Party in 1952. Syrian authorities threatened to arrest him that year for attempting to set up another Palestinian commando group, but he fled to Kuwait. There, he worked as a civil servant, typist, and later as the country's Secretary-General of the Municipal Council Board until 1967. He was awarded Kuwaiti citizenship in the mid-1950s.

== Fatah and PLO activism ==
Al-Hassan was one of the original founders of Fatah, establishing a network of activists in Kuwait. In 1962, al-Hassan, Yasser Arafat, Khalil al-Wazir and Salah Khalaf founded a magazine called Filastuna, Nida' al-Hayat ("Palestine, Our Call to Life"). According to al-Hassan, the Kuwaiti group became known before those in Europe, Qatar, Saudi Arabia, Gaza and Iraq because of the magazine, which was based in Tripoli, Lebanon. Al-Hassan was one of ten members of Fatah's Central Committee, which became the main body of the movement.

In 1968, al-Hassan was elected to the Palestine Liberation Organization Executive Committee (PLO-EC) after Fatah took control of the Palestine Liberation Organization (PLO) in 1968. Early that year, al-Hassan persuaded Saudi King Faisal to enforce the "liberation tax" which required Palestinians in Saudi Arabia to pay a percentage of their income to the PLO. This, in turn, supplied the PLO with 60 million riyal yearly. Also, in that year, he spoke to the Egyptian Foreign Minister Mahmoud Riyad and Mohammad Hassanein Heykal on behalf of Gamal Abdel Nasser in order to familiarize him with Fatah and its armed branch al-Assifa.

From 1973 until his death, al-Hassan was chairman of the Foreign Relations Committee of the Palestinian National Council and was thus considered the first "foreign minister of the PLO". After the Yom Kippur War in 1973, he argued that the "Palestinian struggle" could continue with a state in the Palestinian territories occupied by Israel and he wrote up an unofficial five-point proposal in April–May 1980, advocating for Israel’s withdrawal from the territories, the deployment of United Nations forces, and work on arrangements for the creation of a Palestinian state in the territories.

== Later life and death ==
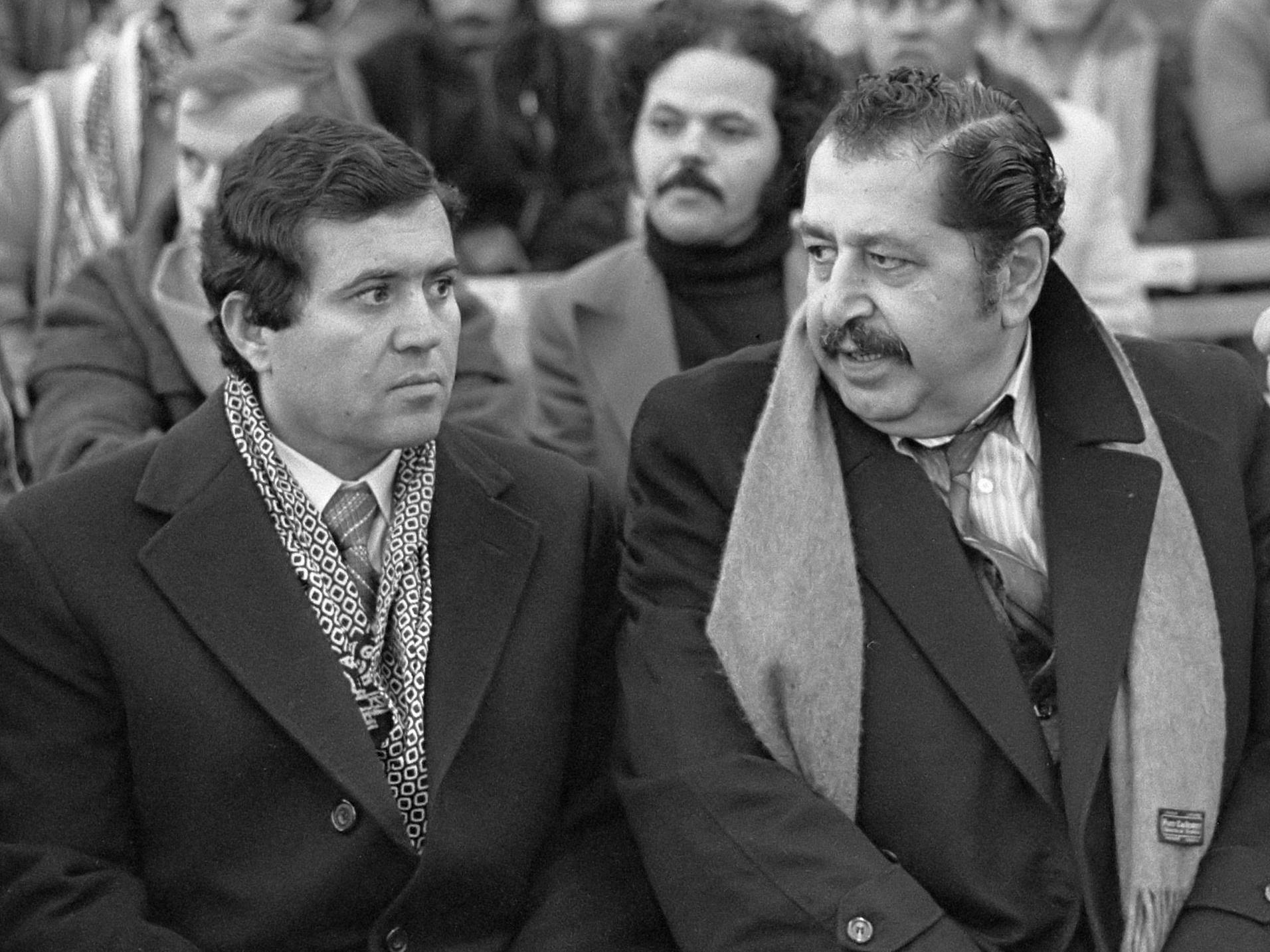
Mahmoud Rabbani and Khaled al-Hassan (1980)

Al-Hassan called for the election of a Palestinian provisional government capable of ending the PLO’s isolation after the First Intifada in 1991. He settled in Rabat, Morocco that year after being expelled, along with hundreds of thousands of other Palestinians, from Kuwait during the Gulf War, in which the PLO aligned itself with Saddam Hussein's Iraq.

Al-Hassan authored Grasping the Nettle of Peace in 1992, advocating a Swiss-style confederation in which citizens from Israel, the Palestinian territories and Jordan would vote according to their canton, hence no recognition of the Arab land captured by Israel in 1948. He opposed the way Arafat and PLO officials handled the Oslo Agreements.

Al-Hassan suffered from cancer since 1991 and died from it on October 8, 1994 at the age of 66.

== See also ==
- List of Fatah members
- Salah Al-Zawawi

== Bibliography ==
- Cobban, Helena (1984). The Palestinian Liberation Organisation: People, Power, and Politics. Cambridge University Press. ISBN 9780521272162.
- al-Hassan, Khalid (1992). Grasping the nettle of peace: a senior Palestinian figure speaks out. Saqi Books. ISBN 9780863563430.
