= Tawfik Tirawi =

Palestinian intelligence chief (born 1948)

Tawfik al-Tirawi

3rd Director of the Palestinian General Intelligence Service
- In office 28 August 2007 – 21 November 2008
- President: Mahmoud Abbas
- Preceded by: Ahmed Shenoura
- Succeeded by: Mohamed Mansour (acting)

Security Adviser to the President
- In office 28 August 2007 – 8 December 2009
- President: Mahmoud Abbas
- Preceded by: Jibril Rajoub
- Succeeded by: Ziad Abu Amr

Chairman of Fatah's Commission for Intellectual Mobilization and Studies
- Incumbent
- Assumed office 2013

Head of Palestinian Authority Intelligence in the West Bank
- In office 1994–2008

Personal details
- Born: 15 November 1948 (age 77) Tira, Mandatory Palestine
- Party: Fatah
- Education: Beirut Arab University (BA); An-Najah National University (MA)

General Tawfik Mohammed Hussein al-Tirawi (born 15 November 1948, Arabic: توفيق الطيراوي) is a Palestinian official affiliated with Fatah. He served as the head of Palestinian Authority Intelligence in the West Bank from 1994 to 2008. He led the investigation into the death of former President Yasser Arafat.

Tirawi, the head of Fatah's Commission for Intellectual Mobilization and Studies, was elected to the Central Committee at the sixth Fatah convention in 2009.

== Early life ==
Tawfik Tirawi was born in the depopulated village of Tira, near Lydda, on 15 November 1948. His family fled to Rantis in 1948. He completed his primary schooling in Ramallah before going to Iskaka village in Salfit and then to Jabr refugee camp in Jericho where he attended junior high and high school. He received a diploma from Ibrahimieh College in Jerusalem. He graduated from Beirut Arab University with a degree in Arabic literature. He earned another degree in philosophy and psychology. He earned a master's degree in educational administration from An-Najah National University in 2008. His genius thesis was 'The Reality of Crises and Proposed Alternatives to Manage it From the Standpoint of Security and Civil Institutions' Leaders in Palestine'. He is preparing a doctoral thesis for the University of Tanta on 'The Role of the University Leadership in Promoting National Belonging'.

== Political activism ==
He joined Fatah in 1967 while attending Beirut Arab University. He headed the Lebanese branch of the General Union of Palestinian Students from 1969 to 1971 and in 1970 he was head of the secret Student Office of the Secretariat of Fatah. In 1978 he became a member of the executive body of the General Union of Palestinian Students and a member of the Palestinian National Council. The Syrian security services arrested him on 23 July 1985. He was tortured for four days by the intelligence services and then kept in solitary confinement for months. He was imprisoned in various locations in Syria until his release on 2 November 1989.

== Intelligence ==
He helped create the Palestinian General Intelligence Service on 7 June 1994. Years later, he stayed with Arafat when his compound came under Israeli siege. President Mahmoud Abbas appointed Tirawi his security adviser as well as head of the Palestinian General Intelligence on 28 August 2007. He served as intelligence head until 21 November 2008 and security adviser until he was elected to the Central Committee of Fatah on 8 December 2009. He served as general of the Popular Organizations commissioner of Fatah from 2009 to 2011. In 2013, he became the general intellectual mobilization and studies commissioner.

He was the Chairman of the Board of Trustees of Al-Istiqlal University in Jericho until 2022, when he was ousted by Mahmoud Abbas.

Government offices
Preceded by Ahmed Shenoura	Director of the Palestinian General Intelligence Service; 2007–2008	Succeeded by Mohamed Mansour; Acting
