= Ahmad Abu Holi =

Palestinian politician (born 1968)

Ahmad Abu Holi (Arabic: أحمد ابو هولي; born 1968) is a Palestinian politician and member of the 2nd Palestinian Legislative Council.

== Biography ==
Abu Holi was born in Central Gaza in 1968. He is a member of Fatah. He was elected to the 2nd Palestinian Legislative Council in 2006.

He was elected to the executive committee of Palestine Liberation Organization. He is in charge of the Refugee Affairs Department of the Palestine Liberation Organization. He has defended the UNRWA mandate against calls for change by the United States.
