= Zakaria al-Agha =

Palestinian politician (1942–2025)

Former member of Fatah's Central Committee and PLO Executive Committee

Leader of Fatah in the Gaza Strip

Personal details
- Born: 13 January 1942 Khan Yunis, Mandatory Palestine
- Died: 12 May 2025 (aged 83) Cairo, Egypt
- Education: Cairo University
- Occupation: Politician, Physician

Zakaria al-Agha (Arabic: زكريا الاغا; 13 January 1942 – 12 May 2025), also known as Abu Ammar, was a member of Fatah's central committee and Palestine Liberation Organization-Executive Committee and the leader of Fatah in the Gaza Strip.

== Life and career ==
Al-Agha was born in Khan Yunis on 13 January 1942. He received his Bachelor of Medicine and Surgery, from Cairo University, in 1965. In 1971, he received a specialization in internal medicine. From 1974 to 1987, he was Chief of Internal Diseases Section at Nasser Hospital in Khan Yunis. From 1989 to 1994, he was Chief of Internal Diseases Section at Al-Ahli Arab Hospital.

Al-Agha was dismissed by the Israeli occupation forces for his activities in supporting the Palestinian resistance against Israeli occupation. He was removed from his post in 1987 and held in administrative detention for approximately six months in 1988 due to his support and assistance to Palestinian resistance in financial support in supporting of the First Intifada.

During the decade between 1981 and 1990, he was prohibited by Israeli occupation firces from leaving the Gaza Strip and in January 1995, he was detained for several weeks for interrogation. On 16 January 2004, Palestinian Authority President Yasser Arafat established the Board of Trustees of Al-Azhar University in Gaza Strip and appointed him its chairman.

Al-Agha died in Cairo on 12 May 2025, at the age of 83.

== Union work ==
- Founding member of the Arab Medical Society of the Gaza Strip 1977.
- Treasurer of the Medical Association of Arabia 1978–1984.
- Chairman of the General Medical Arabia 1985–1992.
- Secretary General of the Council for Higher Education in Jerusalem 1985–1992.
- Association member Blood Bank, Gaza since its inception.
- Member of the Palestinian Red Crescent Society.
- Chairman of the Board of Trustees of Al-Azhar University 2002–2005.

== Public work ==
- A member of the Palestinian national liberation movement (Fatah) since 1967.
- A member of the Fatah Central Committee since 1992 until 2017.
- Accredited of Fateh movement in the Gaza Strip since 1993–2005.
- Member of the executive committee of the PLO 1996-until April 2018.
- Head of the national and international relations of the PLO.
- UNHCR Chief of the Palestine Liberation Organization.

== Political action ==
- A member of the Palestinian delegation tripartite axis of the former American Secretary of State James Baker's side of the late Faisal Husseini, Hanan Ashrawi 1991 (before negotiations in Madrid).
- Negotiator member of the Palestinian delegation at the Madrid and Washington, 1991–1993.
- First Minister of Housing in the first government formed by PNA 1994–1995.
