= Faruq al-Qaddumi =

Palestinian politician (1931–2024)

- فاروق القدومي
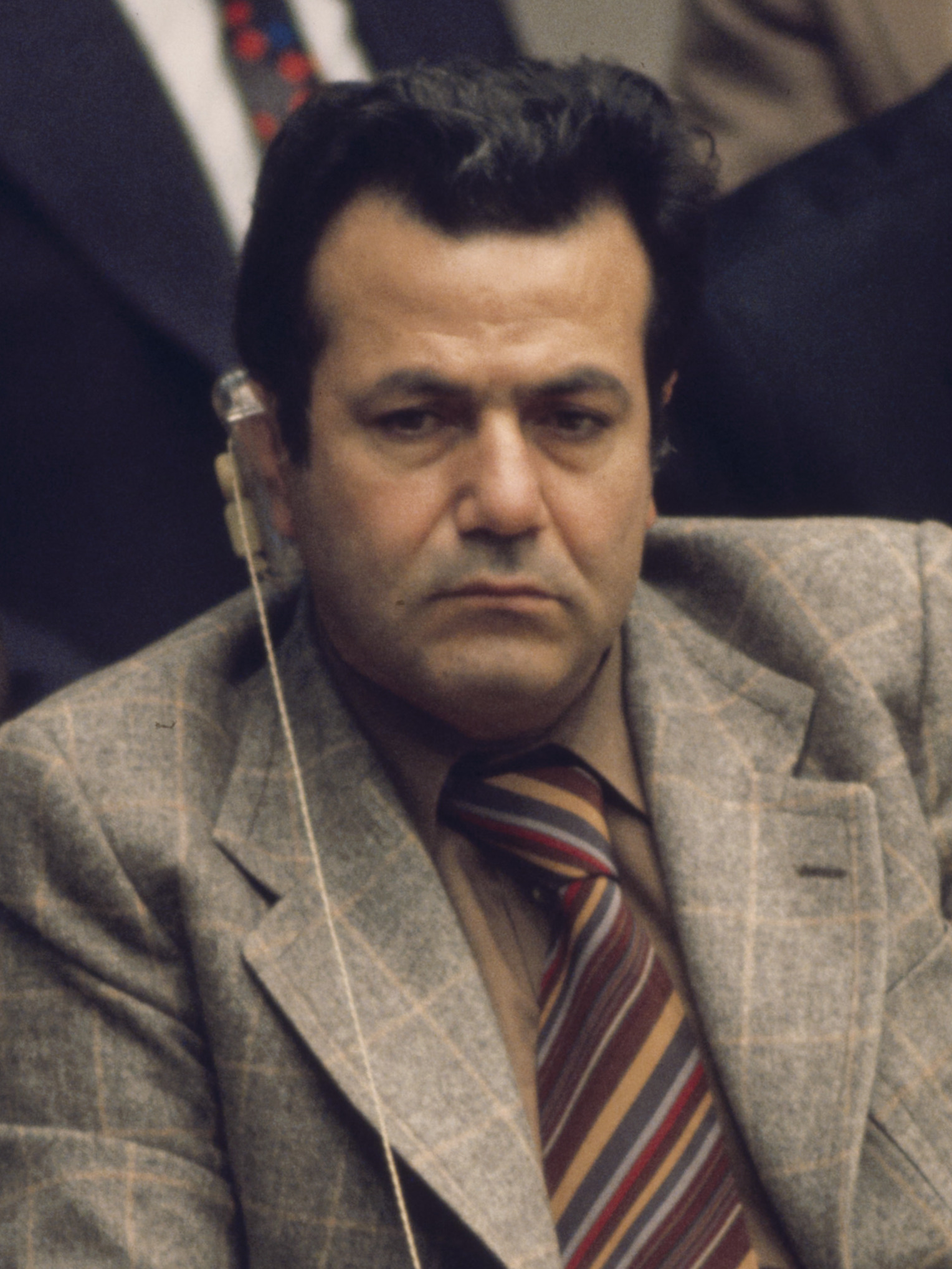

Secretary-General of Fatah's central committee

Chairman of Fatah's central committee
- In office 2004–2009
- Preceded by: Mahmoud Abbas

Head of the PLO's political department
- In office 1973–2009

Personal details
- Born: Faruq al-Qaddumi; 18 August 1931 Jinsafut, near Nablus, Mandatory Palestine
- Died: 22 August 2024 (aged 93) Amman, Jordan
- Party: Fatah
- Other political affiliations: Baath Party (1954–1966)
- Spouse: Nabila Al-Nimr
- Education: American University in Cairo
- Occupation: Politician, economist, political scientist

Faruq al-Qaddumi or Farouk al-Kaddoumi (Arabic: فاروق القدومي; 18 August 1931 – 22 August 2024), also known by the kunya Abu al-Lutf (Arabic: أبو اللطف), was a Palestinian politician who served as the Secretary-General of Fatah until 2009 and Chairman of Fatah's central committee and the Palestine Liberation Organization's political department, operating from Tunisia, between 2004 and 2009.

== Biography ==
Faruq al-Qaddumi was born on 18 August 1931, in the town of Jinsafut near Nablus in Mandatory Palestine and later his family moved to Jaffa. During the 1948 Arab-Israeli War and Nakba they fled to Nablus in the West Bank. In the early 1950s al-Qaddumi worked in Saudi Arabia for the Arab-American Petroleum Company (ARAMCO). In 1954 he moved to Egypt and studied economy and political science at the American University in Cairo. While in Egypt, he joined the Baath party.

== Fatah career ==
In 1958, al-Qaddumi joined Yasser Arafat who was organizing student groups calling for the liberation of Palestine. Fatah, the Palestinian National Liberation Movement, was established at the beginning of 1965. At the time, al-Qaddumi worked for the Ministry of Health of Kuwait. In 1966, he was expelled from the country for political activities connected with the PLO. By 1969 he was one of key figures in the PLO. From 1973 he headed its political department in Beirut, Lebanon.

At the beginning of 1973, al-Qaddumi was appointed head of the PLO's political department. In 1976, Arafat and al-Qaddumi met with Meir Vilner and Tawfik Toubi, heads of Rakah (New Communist List), established after the 1965 split in the Israeli Communist Party, and from which Hadash developed. Since the early 1980s Al-Qaddumi had been living in Tunis where the PLO was based after expulsion from Lebanon.

In 1985, when four Palestinian Liberation Front militants hijacked the MS Achille Lauro and killed Leon Klinghoffer, a wheelchair-using Jewish-American, al-Qaddumi claimed that Klinghoffer was pushed over the side of the ship by his wife for the insurance money.

After the Oslo Accords in 1993, which he opposed as a betrayal of the PLO's principles, al-Qaddumi refused to move to the Palestinian Territories with the rest of the leadership to set up the Palestinian National Authority (PNA). From exile, he continued to advocate a hardline stance towards Israel, refused cooperation with the PNA and repeatedly disagreed with the PLO during negotiations with Israel by making statements denying recognition of Israel. This led to him being sidelined in Palestinian politics for over a decade, as the center of power moved to Gaza and then Ramallah.

Farouk al-Qaddumi became a central figure in the Palestinian Liberation Organization (PLO) and served as the head of its political department for many years. He was instrumental in shaping the PLO's policies and was a close confidant of Yasser Arafat.

His diplomatic efforts extended beyond the Arab world, as he sought to garner international support for the Palestinian cause.

Even after stepping back from his active role in politics, al-Qaddumi remained a respected figure within the Palestinian community.

== PLO power struggle ==
Upon Arafat's death, al-Qaddumi constitutionally succeeded him to the position of Fatah chairman. Finding himself once again in a position of power, he began wrestling for control of the ideologically diverse movement, and of the PLO, pitted against PLO chairman and PNA president Mahmoud Abbas. Mud-slinging between the factions was intense, with al-Qaddumi trying to claim primacy for the PLO (which formally delegates power to the PNA). Among other things, al-Qaddumi denied that the PNA had a right to call its government members "ministers" or open embassies abroad.

While most of the struggle was carried out behind the scenes, the Palestinian Authority – then still in control of the Gaza Strip – suppressed an attempt by al-Qaddumi to organize an armed militia outside of the Authority's control in the Strip. Al-Qaddumi issued a decree to expel all Fatah members who cooperated with the PNA, but this was declared unlawful by Fatah's central committee, along with his styling himself "president" of the movement.

As head of the PLO's political department, al-Qaddumi had primary responsibility for foreign representation. However, the PLO embassies were reorganized by Abbas and PNA Prime Minister Salam Fayyad, who removed al-Qaddumi loyalists from ambassadorial posts. Abbas redirected foreign contacts to pass through the PNA's Minister of Foreign Affairs Nasser Al-Qidwa, and later Ziad Abu Amr and Riad Al-Maliki, which infuriated al-Qaddumi.

The 6th Fatah conference was held in Bethlehem in August 2009. Holding the conference in the occupied territories came as a disappointment to many exiled Fatah leaders who were unable to attend and felt betrayed by this decision; al-Qaddumi being one of them. A few weeks before the conference, al-Qaddumi accused Abbas of conspiring to kill Yasser Arafat and claimed he had evidence for his involvement in a plot to poison Arafat. Abbas and his aides denied those allegations and accused al-Qaddumi of inflaming fitna (divisions, internal strife).

While Abbas was the stronger player in this power struggle, members of the Abbas faction worried that al-Qaddumi's militant attitude would win over radical segments of the Fatah, or he would ally with hardline forces outside the movement, such as Hamas. Al-Qaddumi made many official visits to the Assad regime in Damascus, where he was presented in the Syrian press as representing the Palestinian movement.

== Family ==
Al-Qaddoumi had two sons: Lutof, his eldest, who was often referred to as Abu Lutof, and his second son, Rami.

== Death ==
Al-Qaddumi died in Amman, Jordan on 22 August 2024 at the age of 93, surrounded by his family.

== Views and opinions ==
- "At this stage there will be two states. Many years from now there will be only one." (al-Qaddumi),
- "Resistance is the path to arriving at a political settlement"
- "We shall never allow Israel to live in peace… We shall never recognize Israel, never accept the usurper, the colonialist, the imperialist."

== See also ==
- List of Fatah members
