= Khaled Yashruti =

Palestinian politician (1937–1970)

Member of the National Command of the Arab Socialist Ba'ath Party
- In office 1 September 1959 – 23 October 1963

Personal details
- Born: 1937 Akko, British Palestine
- Died: 1970 (aged 32–33) Beirut, Lebanon
- Party: Lebanon/Palestine Regional Branch of the Arab Socialist Ba'ath Party

Khaled Yashruti (1937 in Akko, Mandatory Palestine – 1970 in Beirut, Lebanon) was a Palestinian political activist and a leading member of the Palestine Liberation Organization.

== The Right wing of Fatah ==
Beyond the Baghdad-oriented Ba'ath Party-linked Arab Liberation Front (ALF), there were some high-ranking members of Fatah itself who were heavily influenced by the original/non-Marxist Pan-Arab doctrine of the Ba'ath.

These people rejected the Soviet Union and Arab states close to it (The pro-Syrian Ba'ath, Algeria, Libya and South Yemen). They resented Yasser Arafat's rapprochement with Moscow and the PLO's progressive drift towards "third-worldist" left-wing rhetoric.

They were viewed as the "conservative" right-wing of Fatah. Many were members of the Galilean/Northern Palestinian aristocracy (such as Khaled Yashruti's father, who was the hereditary Shaykh of the Shadhiliyya Sufi brotherhood in pre-1947 Palestine). Most had studied in the United States or at the American University of Beirut in the late 1950s.

== Involvement in the PLO ==
He created Jabhat Tahrîr Filistîn (Palestine Liberation Front) in Liban. Khaled Yashruti progressively became their leader in the mid-1960s, and became a member of the PLO leadership in 1968, two years before Fatah's commanders were expelled to Lebanon from Jordan. Yashruti's faction had the backing of the Al-Bakr/Saddam Hussein Ba'athist government in Baghdad and was generally favorable to U.S. involvement in the Middle-East as a counterweight to the growing influence of the Soviet Union and Israel.

In parallel to his political activities, Khaled worked as a civil engineer and real estate entrepreneur in Lebanon. He died in 1970 in an accident, where a huge crane fell on him while he was inspecting construction works in downtown Beirut. Some Palestinian and Lebanese journalists argued this was not an accident, but murder.
