= Fatah Hawks =

Palestinian militant groups

- Fatah Hawks Logo
- Dates active: 1991–1995, 2004–2005
- Active regions: Gaza Strip, West Bank
- Ideology: Anti-Zionism; Palestinian nationalism Socialism

The Fatah Hawks is the name of two Palestinian militant groups. One is a popular movement of Palestinian youth in the West Bank and Gaza in the 1980s. The other is an offshoot of the Al-Aqsa Martyrs' Brigades which has links to the dominant Fatah movement. The group has carried out attacks against Israeli military personnel in the Gaza Strip and were regarded as Yasser Arafat's "own troops".

During the First Intifada that started in 1987, the Hawks were led by young Palestinians in the large cities of Nablus, Tulkarm, Ramallah and Bethlehem in the West Bank, and Gaza City and Khan Younis in the Gaza Strip. Most of their attacks were carried out using improvised weapons; stone throwing, stabbing attacks, and use of stolen firearms. The amount of weaponry that they received from PLO sources outside of Israel was negligible, and most of their successes were in the use of stabbing attacks or roadside ambushes of Israeli soldiers in the Palestinian territories. This organisation was disbanded under the provisions of the Oslo Accords. However, they continued to operate until 1997 as Arafat's personal stormtroopers against rival factions.

The group reappeared during the Al-Aqsa Intifada by claiming joint responsibility with Hamas for an attack on the Rafah border crossing on the Israeli military-controlled Egyptian border crossing with Gaza near Rafah on December 12, 2004, which resulted in five Israeli soldiers being killed and ten others wounded. Hawk member Yasser Abu Samahdaneh was responsible for the death of "at least" 35 Arabs, many of whom were "personal enemies or political rivals he arbitrarily executed," and of killing Yehoshua Weisbrod, an Israeli.

Following the death of Yasser Arafat in 2004, the Fatah hawks suffered like many other Fatah-based militant groups from increasing Palestinian apathy as the corrupt and old faced style Fatah lost public confidence in favour of Hamas.

The number of attacks have decreased. The Fatah Hawks' last activity was in 2005 when Fatah Hawk gunmen blockaded a Palestinian road and prevented Palestinian National Authority (PA) officials from passing in protest at not being assigned to the PA security system.
