= Al-Mustaqbal (electoral list) =

Electoral list in the Palestinian territories

Al-Mustaqbal (Arabic: المستقبل, lit. 'The Future') was a Palestinian electoral list headed by Marwan Barghouti and registered in December 2005 for January 2006 elections for the Palestinian Legislative Council.

== Re-consolidation ==
On 28 December 2005, it was announced that Fatah was going to submit a new, unified list for the January primaries, consisting of members from both Fatah's old guard and Al-Mustaqbal. Barghouti was given the top slot on the list. Al-Mustaqbal spokesmen claimed that the decision to re-join Fatah was motivated out a desire to prevent Hamas from gaining electoral strength. Shortly after the announcement, Barghouti began campaigning for Fatah from his jail cell, apologizing to young Fatah members for the party's past mistakes, particularly relating to corruption. Despite the merger news, some analysts believe that the division in the party is far from resolved, and that an increase in rivalries and inter-party factionalism will occur after the elections. There is a definite possibility that such a development could quickly turn violent, as both groups exert control over various large militias.

== Mustaqbal post-elections ==
In the wake of Fatah's defeat in the elections, Mustaqbal's early momentum seems to have been largely stalled, and it is unclear what role, if any, it will play as an independent, or partially autonomous faction within Fatah or Palestinian government in the future. As of several months after its formation, the party had yet to publicly disclose its platform or positions, leaving many questions about its policies, particularly regarding territorial demands and violence against Israel, unanswered. Some analysts have suggested that Mustaqbal's ultimate significance lies in the fact that it firmly demonstrated just how wide the existing gap between the old and young generations of Fatah activists is, and that it wound up splitting the Fatah vote in many districts when discontented Mustaqbal members ran independent of the "re-integrated" Fatah list.

== See also ==
- List of political parties in the Palestinian National Authority
- Gaza war hostage crisis
