= Jibril Rajoub =

Palestinian politician (born 1953)

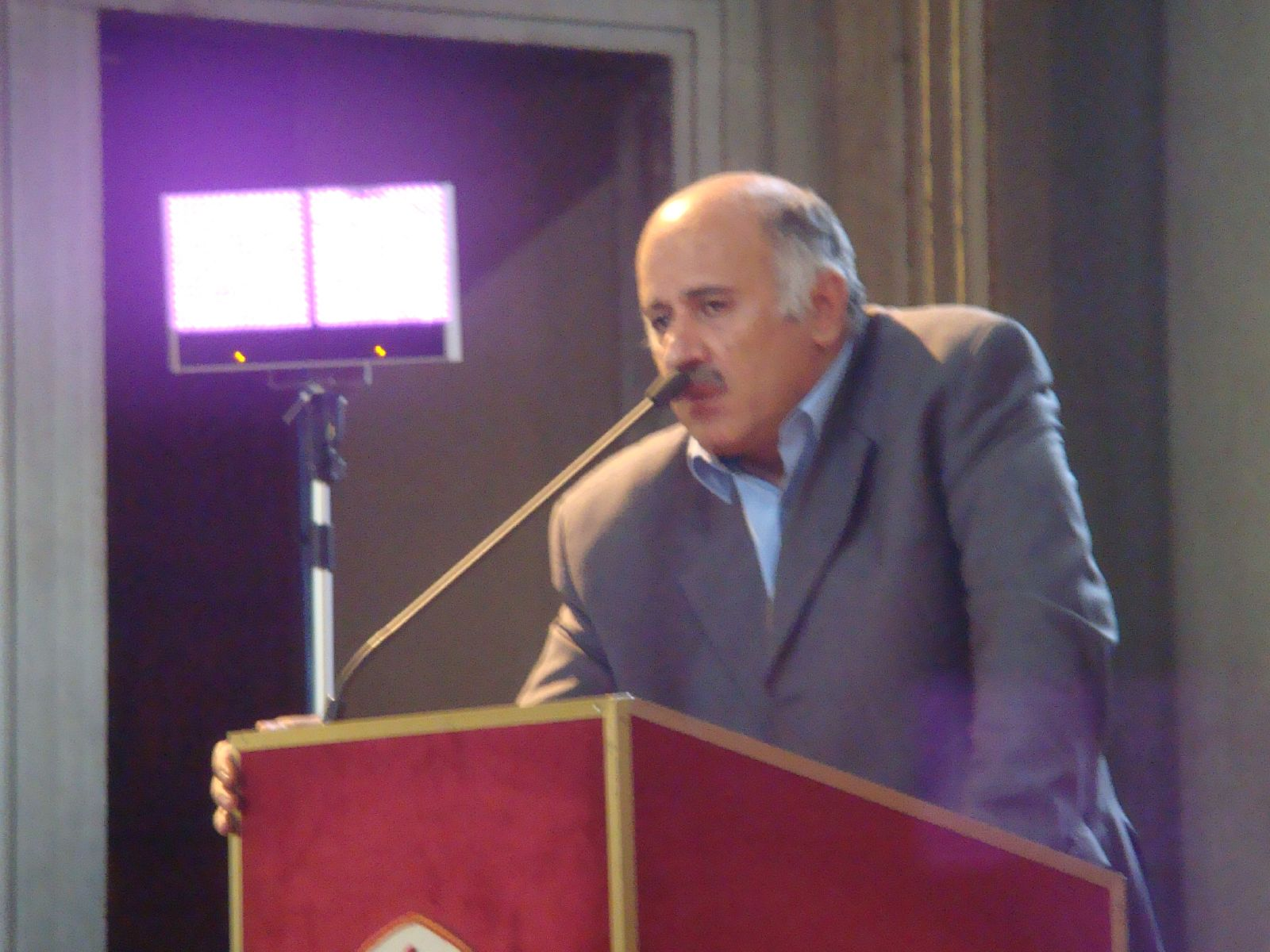
- Rajoub in 2007

President of the Palestinian Football Association
- Incumbent
- Assumed office 11 May 2008
- Preceded by: Ahmed Al-Afifi

Chairman of the Palestine Olympic Committee
- Incumbent
- Assumed office 20 December 2008
- Preceded by: Ahmed al-Qudwa

Personal details
- Born: Jibril Mahmoud Muhammad Rajoub; 14 May 1953 (age 73) Dura, Jordanian West Bank
- Party: Fatah
- Occupation: Politician

Military service
- Allegiance: PLO: Fatah; Palestine
- Branch/service: Palestinian Preventive Security
- Rank: Major general
- Battles/wars: War of Attrition; First Intifada; Second Intifada

Jibril Mahmoud Muhammad Rajoub (Arabic: جبريل محمود محمد الرجوب; born 14 May 1953), also known by his kunya Abu Rami (أبو رامي), is a Palestinian politician, legislator, and former militant. He leads the Palestinian Football Association and the Palestine Olympic Committee. He was the head of the Preventive Security Force in the West Bank until being dismissed (along with the force's chief in Gaza, Ghazi Jabali) in 2002. He had been a member of the Fatah Revolutionary Council until 2009 and was elected to the Fatah Central Committee at the party's 2009 congress, serving as Deputy-Secretary until 2017, before being elected Secretary General of the Central Committee in 2017.

== Biography ==
=== Early years ===
Rajoub was born in the town of Dura, near Hebron. In 1968, he was arrested by Shin Bet at age 15 on suspicion of aiding fleeing Egyptian officers, and spent four months in prison. While in prison, he met a local Fatah leader, who recommended that he be accepted into the organization, which was then secretive. After his release, he joined Fatah. His tasks were to assist fighters and build up cells in the Hebron Hills.

In September 1970, Rajoub was arrested for throwing a grenade at an Israeli army bus near Hebron. He was tried and convicted of this attack and of membership in an armed group, and sentenced to life in prison. He became a prominent figure among prisoners, leading hunger strikes and protests. He also studied Zionism and Hebrew extensively and, together with a cellmate, translated The Revolt by Menachem Begin into Arabic. Rajoub spent time in numerous prisons throughout the West Bank and Israel, as Israeli authorities moved prisoners around to disrupt their organization.

=== 1985–1993 ===
In 1985, Rajoub was one of 1,150 Arab prisoners freed in exchange for three Israeli hostages held by the PFLP-GC. He was soon rearrested for resuming militant activities, and was interrogated and placed in solitary confinement. He was hospitalized after a 30-day hunger strike. After his recovery, he returned to prison, and was released seven months later. In September 1986, he was arrested again for militant activity, and was imprisoned until March 1987.

Rajoub continued to work with Fatah cells in the West Bank. He was arrested for his activities during the First Intifada in December 1987, and was deported to Lebanon in January 1988. He relocated to Tunis, Tunisia, where he was an advisor on the Intifada to Fatah deputy leader Khalil al-Wazir. After Wazir's assassination by Israeli commandos, he became a close lieutenant of Arafat, and was allegedly behind a 1992 plot to assassinate Ariel Sharon.

=== 1994–2022 ===
In 1994, Rajoub was allowed to return to the West Bank following the signing of the Oslo Accords. He served as head of the Preventive Security Force until 2002, and Yasser Arafat appointed him as his national security advisor in 2003. During his tenure, he was accused of using the force to quash political dissent and harass political opponents of Arafat and the Palestinian National Authority.

Since 2008 Rajoub has been President of the Palestinian Football Association. He is also President of the Palestine Olympic Committee, Head of the PLO Supreme Council for Sport and Youth Affairs and Chairman of the Palestinian Scout Association. He was awarded the Mohammed Bin Rashid Al Maktoum Creative Sports Award for sports administrative creativity in 2013.

In 2013, Rajoub told Hezbollah-affiliated television network Al Mayadeen "until now we have not had nuclear weapons", he declared, "but in the name of Allah, if we had nuclear weapons, we'd be using them."

In November 2015, Rajoub named a table tennis tournament in honor of Muhannad Halabi, who had stabbed and killed two Israeli civilians in Jerusalem a month prior. A poster advertising the tournament featured two images of Halabi, and stated: "patronage of the leader Jibril Rajoub, head of the Palestine Olympic Committee." He also attended a boxing match named in honor of Ali Hassan Salameh, a planner of Black September, which killed 11 Israeli Olympians during the 1972 Summer Olympics in Munich.

In August 2018 Rajoub was fined CHF 20,000 (US$20,333) and banned by the Fédération Internationale de Football Association (FIFA) from FIFA matches for a year for "inciting hatred and violence" by urging fans to burn Lionel Messi shirts and pictures because Argentina was due to play a friendly match against Israel. ("breaching article 53 (Inciting hatred and violence) of the FIFA Disciplinary Code"). In July 2019, his appeal on the ban was dismissed by the International Court of Arbitration for Sport.

=== 2023–present ===
Between May and June 2024, amid the Gaza war, Rajoub, as the head of both the Palestinian Football Association and the Palestine Olympic Committee, called on FIFA and the International Olympic Committee (IOC) to ban Israel from their competitions, citing the effects of Israeli attacks to Palestinian sports as well as "violations committed by some Israeli athletes and official Israeli sports institutions". Israel took part in the 2024 Summer Olympics as usual. On 13 August 2024, upon his return from the Olympics, the Israel Defense Forces (IDF) briefly detained Rajoub, confiscating his passport and summoning him for interrogation for the next day. Rajoub stated that he would not comply with the order, as it was issued by "an occupation authority".
