= Fatah =

Palestinian political party

Palestinian National Liberation Movement حركة التحرير الوطني الفلسطيني
- Abbreviation: Fatah
- Chairman: Mahmoud Abbas
- Secretary-General: Jibril Rajoub
- Vice Chairman: Hussein al-Sheikh
- Founders: Yasser Arafat; Khaled Yashruti; Salah Khalaf; Khalil al-Wazir
- Founded: 1959 (as a political movement); 1965 (as a political party)
- Headquarters: Ramallah, West Bank
- Youth wing: Fatah Youth
- Armed wing: Al-'Asifah (1965–2000) al-Aqsa Martyrs' Brigades (2000–2007)
- Ideology: Palestinian nationalism; Social democracy; Liberalism; Secularism; Pan-Arabism; Conservatism; Anti-imperialism; Two-state solution; Historical: Socialism
- Political position: Centre to centre-left
- National affiliation: Palestine Liberation Organization
- Regional affiliation: PSOM (historical)
- European affiliation: Party of European Socialists (observer)
- International affiliation: Progressive Alliance; Socialist International
- Colours: Yellow
- Slogan: يا جبل ما يهزك ريح; Yā jabal mā yhizzak rīḥ ('O mountain, no wind can shake you') ثورة حتى النصر; Thawra ḥattā l-naṣr ('Revolution until victory')
- Palestinian Legislative Council: 45 / 132 (34%)

Flag

Website
- fatehmedia.ps

Fatah
- Leaders: Al-'Asifah (1965–2000); Black September Organization (1970–1988); Fatah Special Operations Group (?–?); Force 14 (1960s–2001); Force 17 (1970s–2007); Fatah Hawks (1991–2005); Tanzim (1995–2005); Al-Aqsa Martyrs' Brigades (2000–2007)
- Dates active: 1959–2007
- Headquarters: Ramallah, West Bank
- Size: 2,000–3,000 (2006)
- Part of: Palestine Liberation Organization

Fatah (/ˈfɑːtə, fəˈtɑː/ FAH-tə, fə-TAH; Arabic: فتح, romanized: Fatḥ [ˈfʌtɑħ]), officially the Palestinian National Liberation Movement (حركة التحرير الوطني الفلسطيني, Ḥarakat at-Taḥrīr al-Waṭanī l-Filasṭīnī), is a Palestinian nationalist and social democratic political party. It is the largest faction of the confederated multi-party Palestine Liberation Organization (PLO) and the second-largest party in the Palestinian Legislative Council (PLC). Mahmoud Abbas, the president of the Palestinian Authority, is the chairman of Fatah.

Fatah was historically involved in armed struggle against the state of Israel (as well as Jordan during the Black September conflict in 1970–1971) and maintained a number of militant groups, which carried out attacks against military targets as well as Israeli civilians, notably including the 1978 coastal road massacre, though the group disengaged from armed conflict against Israel around the time of the Oslo Accords (1993–1995), when it recognised Israel, which gave it limited control over the occupied Palestinian territories. During the Second Intifada (2000–2005), Fatah intensified armed conflict against Israel, claiming responsibility for a number of suicide attacks. Fatah had been closely identified with the leadership of its founder and chairman, Yasser Arafat, until his death in 2004, when Farouk Kaddoumi constitutionally succeeded him to the position of Fatah Chairman and continued in the position until 2009, when Abbas was elected chairman. Since Arafat's death, factionalism within the ideologically diverse movement has become more apparent.

In the 2006 election for the PLC, the party lost its majority in the PLC to Hamas. The Hamas legislative victory led to a conflict between Fatah and Hamas, with Fatah retaining control of the Palestinian National Authority in the West Bank through its president. Fatah is also active in the control of Palestinian refugee camps.

== Etymology ==
The full name of the movement is Ḥarakat al-Taḥrīr al-Waṭanī l-Filasṭīnī, meaning the 'Palestinian National Liberation Movement'. From this was crafted the inverted acronym Fatḥ (generally rendered in English as Fatah), meaning 'opening', 'conquering', or 'victory'. The word fatḥ is used in religious discourse to signify the Islamic expansion in the first centuries of Islamic history – as in Fatḥ al-Shām, the 'conquering of the Levant'. Fatḥ is also religiously significant as the name of the 48th sura (chapter) of the Quran which, according to major Muslim commentators, details the story of the Treaty of Hudaybiyyah. During the peaceful two years after the Hudaybiyyah treaty, many converted to Islam, increasing the strength of the Muslim side. It was the breach of this treaty by the Quraysh that triggered the conquest of Mecca. This Islamic precedent was cited by Arafat as justification for his signing the Oslo Accords with Israel.

== History ==
=== Establishment ===
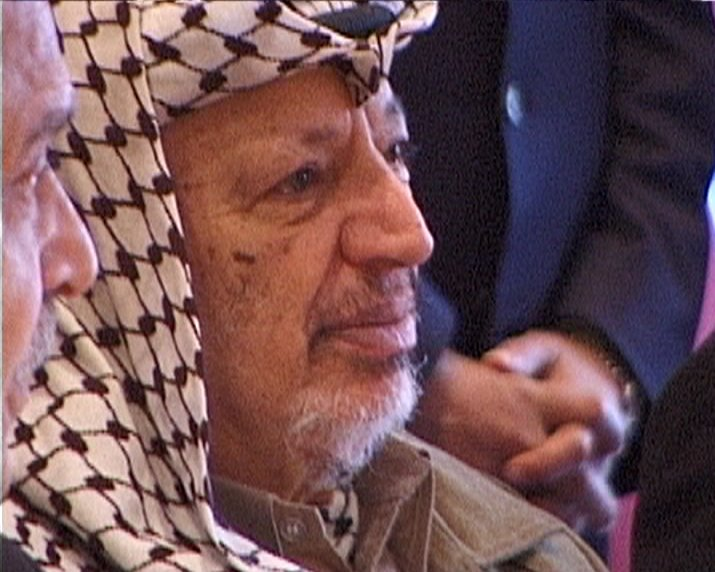
Yasser Arafat was the primary founder of Fatah and its leader until his 2004 death

The Fatah movement was founded in 1959 by members of the Palestinian diaspora, principally by professionals working in the Persian Gulf States, especially Kuwait (then a British protectorate) where the founders Salah Khalaf, Khalil al-Wazir, and Yasser Arafat resided. The founders had studied in Cairo or Beirut and had been refugees in Gaza. Salah Khalaf and Khalil al-Wazir were official members of the Muslim Brotherhood. Arafat had previously been head of the General Union of Palestinian Students (GUPS) at the Cairo University (1952–1956), whilst another co-founder, Khaled Yashruti, then a 22-year-old student, was the GUPS head in Beirut. Upon founding, Arafat summoned Mahmoud Abbas (who was residing in Qatar, then a British protectorate) to join. The group of Gulf-based young Palestinian professionals were the core of Fatah in its early days of existence. Fatah espoused a Palestinian nationalist ideology in which Palestinian Arabs would be liberated by their own actions.

Immediately after its establishment the name of the movement was first used in Falastinuna which was the official media organ of Fatah.

=== 1967–1993 ===
Fatah became the dominant force in Palestinian politics after the Six-Day War in 1967.

Fatah joined the Palestine Liberation Organization (PLO) in 1967, and was allocated 33 of 105 seats in the PLO Executive Committee. Fatah's Arafat became Chairman of the PLO in 1969, after the position was ceded to him by Yahya Hammuda. According to the BBC, "Arafat took over as chairman of the executive committee of the PLO in 1969, a year that Fatah is recorded to have carried out 2,432 guerrilla attacks on Israel."

==== Battle of Karameh ====
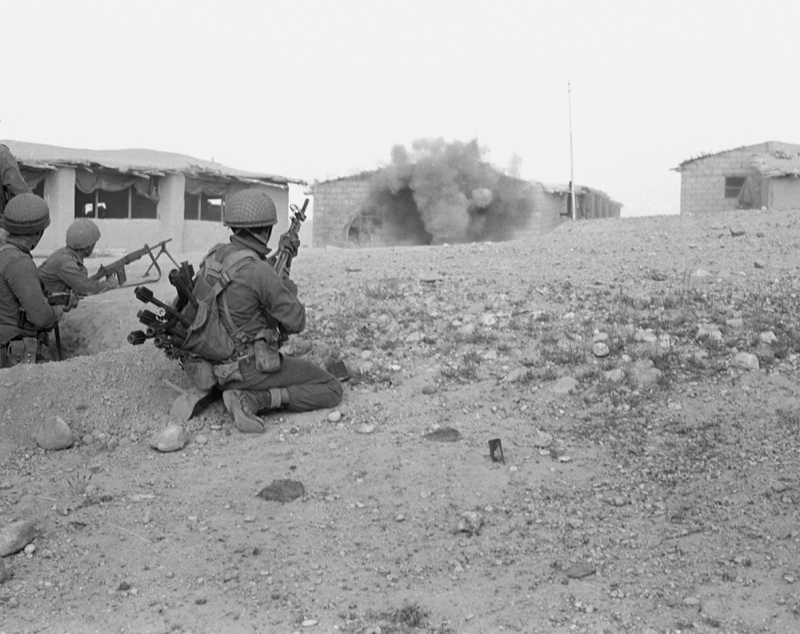
Israeli troops in combat in Karameh

Throughout 1968, Fatah and other Palestinian armed groups were the target of a major Israel Defense Forces (IDF) operation in the Jordanian village of Karameh, where Fatah headquarters – as well as a mid-sized Palestinian refugee camp – were located. The town's name is the Arabic word for dignity, which elevated its symbolism to the Arab people, especially after the Arab defeat in 1967. The operation was in response to attacks against Israel, including rocket strikes from Fatah and other Palestinian militias into the occupied West Bank. Knowledge of the operation was available well ahead of time, and the government of Jordan (as well as a number of Fatah commandos) informed Arafat of Israel's large-scale military preparations. Upon hearing the news, many guerrilla groups in the area, including George Habash's newly formed group the Popular Front for the Liberation of Palestine (PFLP) and Nayef Hawatmeh's breakaway organization the Democratic Front for the Liberation of Palestine (DFLP), withdrew their forces from the town. Fatah leaders were advised by a pro-Fatah Jordanian divisional commander to withdraw their men and headquarters to nearby hills, but on Arafat's orders, Fatah remained, and the Jordanian Army agreed to back them if heavy fighting ensued.

On the night of 21 March, the IDF attacked Karameh with heavy weaponry, armored vehicles and fighter jets. Fatah held its ground, surprising the Israeli military. As Israel's forces intensified their campaign, the Jordanian Army became involved, causing the Israelis to retreat in order to avoid a full-scale war. By the end of the battle, nearly 150 Fatah militants had been killed, as well as twenty Jordanian soldiers and twenty-eight Israeli soldiers. Despite the higher Arab death toll, Fatah considered themselves victorious because of the Israeli army's rapid withdrawal.

==== Black September ====
In the late 1960s, tensions between Palestinians and the Jordanian government increased greatly; heavily armed Arab resistance elements had created a virtual "state within a state" in Jordan, eventually controlling several strategic positions in that country. After their victory in the Battle of Karameh, Fatah and other Palestinian militias began taking control of civil life in Jordan. They set up roadblocks, publicly humiliated Jordanian police forces, molested women and levied illegal taxes – all of which Arafat either condoned or ignored.

In 1970, the Jordanian government moved to regain control over its territory, and the next day, King Hussein declared martial law. By 25 September, the Jordanian army achieved dominance in the fighting, and two days later Arafat and Hussein agreed to a series of ceasefires. The Jordanian army inflicted heavy casualties upon the Palestinians – including civilians – who suffered approximately 3,500 fatalities. Two thousand Fatah fighters managed to enter Syria. They crossed the border into Lebanon to join Fatah forces in that country, where they set up their new headquarters. A large group of guerrilla fighters led by Fatah field commander Abu Ali Iyad held out the Jordanian Army's offensive in the northern city of Ajlun until they were decisively defeated in July 1971. Abu Ali Iyad was executed and surviving members of his commando force formed the Black September Organization, a splinter group of Fatah. In November 1971, the group assassinated Jordanian prime minister Wasfi al-Tal as retaliation to Abu Ali Iyad's execution.

In the 1960s and the 1970s, Fatah provided training to a wide range of European, Middle Eastern, Asian, and African militant and insurgent groups, and carried out numerous attacks against Israeli targets in Western Europe and the Middle East during the 1970s. Some militant groups that affiliated themselves to Fatah, and some of the fedayeen within Fatah itself, carried out civilian-aircraft hijackings and terrorist attacks, attributing them to Black September, Abu Nidal's Fatah-Revolutionary Council, Abu Musa's group, the PFLP, and the PFLP-GC. Fatah received weapons, explosives and training from the Soviet Union and some of the communist states of East Europe. China and Algeria also provided munitions. In 1979, Fatah aided Uganda during the Uganda–Tanzania War. Members of the organization fought alongside the Uganda Army and Libyan troops against the Tanzania People's Defence Force during the Battle of Lukaya and the Fall of Kampala, but were eventually forced to retreat from the country.

==== Lebanon ====
The Lebanese Civil War lasted from 1975 to 1990. Although hesitant at first to take sides in the conflict, Arafat and Fatah played an important role in the Lebanese Civil War. Succumbing to pressure from PLO sub-groups such as the PFLP, DFLP and the Palestinian Liberation Front (PLF), Fatah aligned itself with the communist and Nasserist Lebanese National Movement (LNM). Although originally aligned with Fatah, Syrian President Hafez al-Assad feared a loss of influence in Lebanon and switched sides. He sent his army, along with the Syrian-backed Palestinian factions of as-Sa'iqa and the Popular Front for the Liberation of Palestine – General Command (PFLP-GC) led by Ahmad Jibril to fight alongside the Christian forces against the PLO and the LNM. The primary component of the Christian militias was the Maronite Phalangists.

Phalangist forces killed twenty-six Fatah trainees on a bus in April 1975, marking the official start of the 15-year-long Lebanese civil war. Later that year, an alliance of Christian militias overran the Palestinian refugee camp of Karantina killing over 1,000 civilians. The PLO and LNM retaliated by attacking the town of Damour, a Phalangist and Free Tigers (Numūr al-Aḥrar) stronghold, killing 684 civilians. As the civil war progressed over 2 years of urban warfare, both parties resorted to massive artillery duels and heavy use of sniper nests, while atrocities and war crimes were committed by both sides.

In 1976, with strategic planning help from the Lebanese Army, the alliance of Christian militias, spearheaded by the National Liberal Party of former President Camille Chamoun's militant branch, the Free Tigers, took a pivotal refugee camp in the Eastern part of Beirut, the Tel al-Zaatar camp, after a six-month siege, also known as the Tel al-Zaatar massacre in which hundreds perished. (Note: Disputed; in Faces of Lebanon. Sects, Wars, and Global Extensions pp. 162–165, William Harris states "Perhaps 3,000 Palestinians, mostly civilians, died in the siege and its aftermath." The Lebanese-American Association suggests several thousand.) Arafat and Abu Jihad blamed themselves for not successfully organizing a rescue effort.

PLO cross-border raids against Israel grew somewhat during the late 1970s. One of the most severe – known as the Coastal road massacre – occurred on 11 March 1978. A force of nearly a dozen Fatah fighters landed their boats near a major coastal road connecting the city of Haifa with Tel Aviv-Yafo. There they hijacked a bus and sprayed gunfire inside and at passing vehicles, killing thirty-seven civilians. In response, the IDF launched Operation Litani three days later, with the goal of taking control of Southern Lebanon up to the Litani River. The IDF achieved this goal, and Fatah withdrew to the north into Beirut.

Israel invaded Lebanon again in 1982. Beirut was soon besieged and bombarded by the IDF; to end the siege, the US and European governments brokered an agreement guaranteeing safe passage for Arafat and Fatah – guarded by a multinational force – to exile in Tunis. Despite the exile, many Fatah commanders and fighters remained in Lebanon, and they faced the War of the Camps in the 1980s in their fight with the Shia Amal Movement and also in connection with internal schisms within the Palestinian factions.

=== After 1993 ===
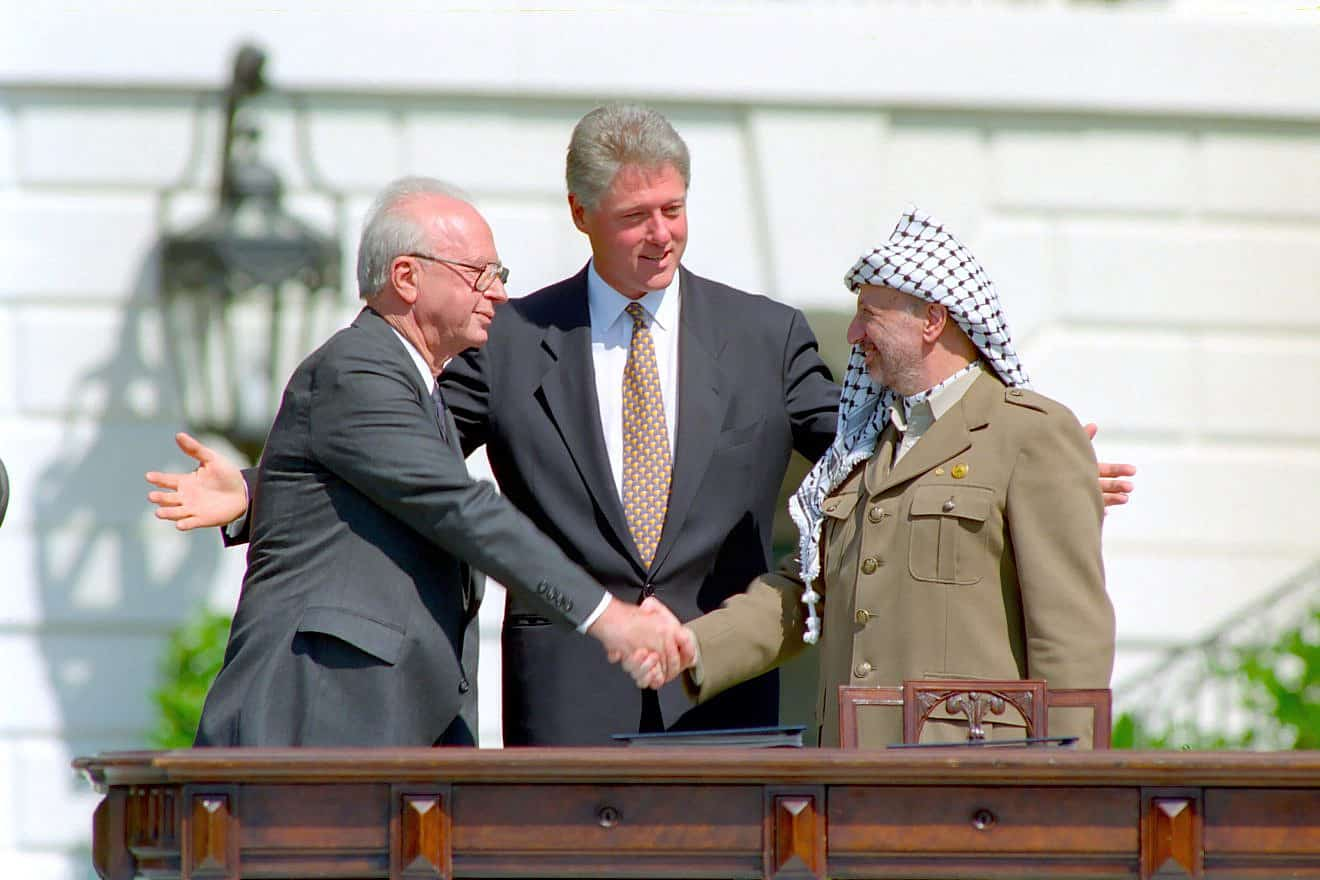
Yitzhak Rabin, Bill Clinton, and Yasser Arafat during the Oslo Accords signing ceremony at the White House on 13 September 1993

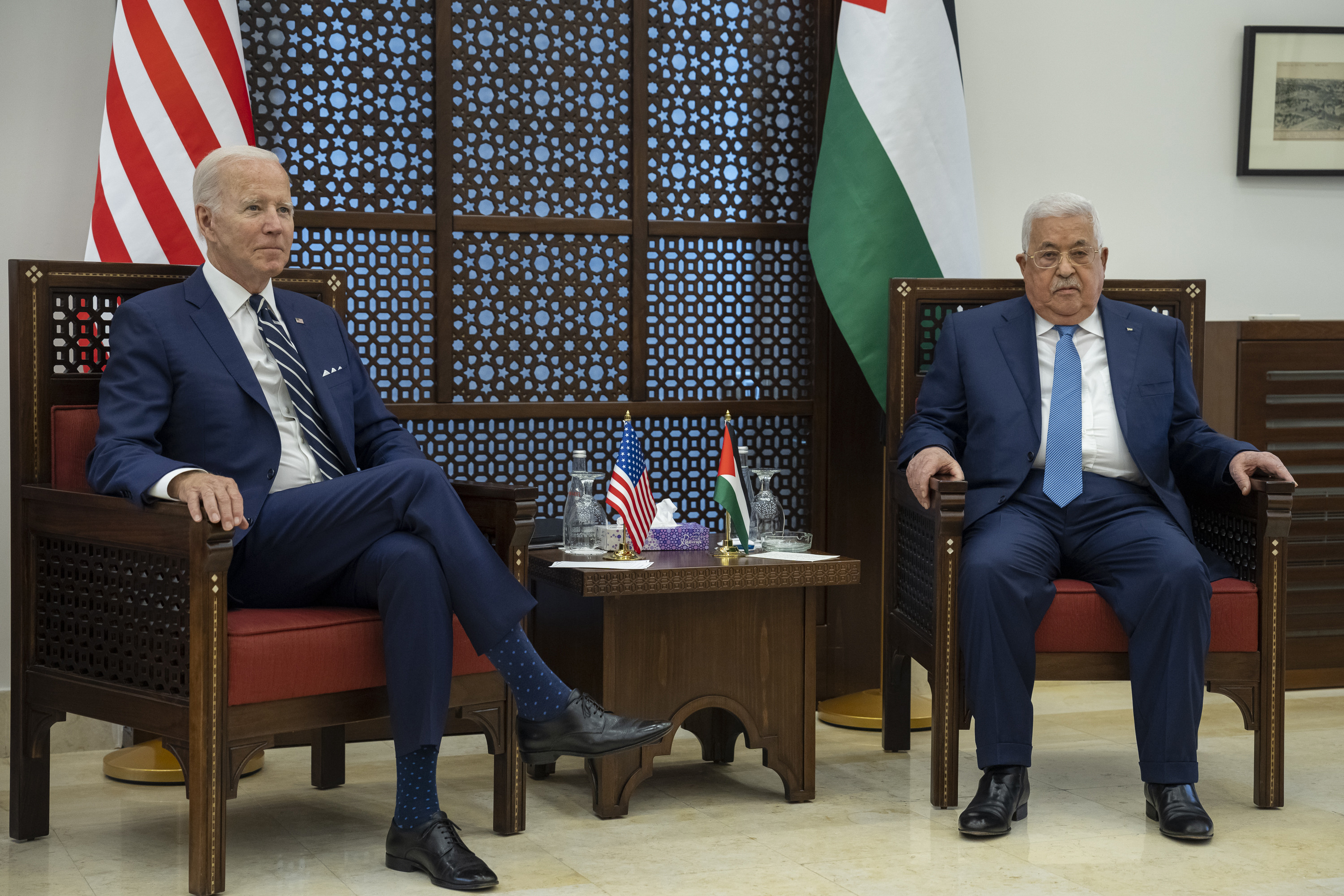
Fatah leader Mahmoud Abbas with U.S. President Joe Biden at the Palestinian Presidential Palace in Bethlehem on 15 July 2022

==== Presidential and legislative elections ====
In the 1993–1995 Oslo Accords, Fatah, as part of the PLO, made some interim agreements with Israel, including recognition of Israel by the PLO. Until his 2004 death, Arafat headed the Palestinian National Authority, the provisional entity created as a result of those Oslo Accords. Soon after Arafat's death, Faruq al-Qaddumi was elected to the post.

Fatah nominated Mahmoud Abbas in the Palestinian presidential election of 2005.

In 2005, Hamas won in nearly all the municipalities it contested. Political analyst Salah Abdel-Shafi told the BBC about the difficulties of Fatah leadership: "I think it's very, very serious – it's becoming obvious that they can't agree on anything." Fatah is "widely seen as being in desperate need of reform," as "the PA's performance has been a story of corruption and incompetence – and Fatah has been tainted."

==== Internal discord ====
In December 2005, jailed Intifada leader Marwan Barghouti broke ranks with the party and announced that he had formed a new political list to run in the elections called the al-Mustaqbal ('The Future'), mainly composed of members of Fatah's "Young Guard." These younger leaders have repeatedly expressed frustration with the entrenched corruption in the party, which has been run by the "Old Guard" who returned from exile in Tunisia following the Oslo Accords. Al-Mustaqbal was to campaign against Fatah in the 2006 Palestinian legislative election, presenting a list including Mohammed Dahlan, Kadoura Fares, Samir Mashharawi and Jibril Rajoub. However, on 28 December 2005, the leadership of the two factions agreed to submit a single list to voters, headed by Barghouti, who began actively campaigning for Fatah from his jail cell.

There have been numerous other expressions of discontent within Fatah, which is just holding its first general congress in two decades. Because of this, the movement remains largely dominated by aging cadres from the pre-Oslo era of Palestinian politics. Several of them gained their positions through the patronage of Arafat, who balanced above the different factions, and the era after his death in 2004 has seen increased infighting among these groups, who jockey for influence over future development, the political line, funds, and constituencies. There is concern over the succession once Abbas leaves power.

Palestinian enclaves as of July 2025 (Area A and B under the Oslo II Accord). Area A (light yellow) is exclusively administered by the Fatah-controlled Palestinian National Authority.

There have been no open splits within the older generation of Fatah politicians since the 1980s, though there is occasional friction between members of the top leadership. One founding member, Faruq al-Qaddumi (Abu Lutf), openly opposed the post-Oslo arrangements and led a campaign for a more hardline position from exile in Tunis, until his death in 2024. Since Arafat's death, he is formally head of Fatah's political bureau and chairman, but his actual political following within Fatah appears limited. He has at times openly challenged the legitimacy of Abbas and harshly criticized both him and Dahlan, but despite threats to splinter the movement, he remains in his position, and his challenges have so far been fruitless. Another influential veteran, Hani al-Hassan, has also openly criticized the present leadership.

Fatah's internal conflicts have also, due to the creation of the Palestinian Authority, merged with the turf wars between different PA security services, e.g., a longstanding rivalry between the West Bank (Jibril Rajoub) and Gaza (Dahlan) branches of the powerful Preventive Security Service. Foreign backing for different factions contribute to conflict, e.g., with the United States generally seen as supportive of Abbas's overall leadership and of Dahlan's security influence, and Syria alleged to promote al-Qaddumi's challenge to the present leadership. The younger generations of Fatah, especially within the militant al-Aqsa Martyrs' Brigades, have been more prone to splits, and a number of lesser networks in Gaza and the West Bank have established themselves as either independent organizations or joined Hamas. However, such overt breaks with the movement have still been rather uncommon, despite numerous rivalries inside and between competing local Fatah groups.

==== 2009: Sixth General Assembly ====
The Sixth General Assembly of the Fatah Movement began on 4 August 2009 in Bethlehem, nearly 16 years after the Oslo I Accord and 20 years since the last Fatah convention, after being repeatedly postponed over conflicts ranging from representation to venue. More than 2,000 delegates attended the meeting, while another 400 from the Gaza Strip were unable to attend the conference after Hamas barred them from traveling to the West Bank.

Internal dissension over financial and political arguments quickly arose. Saudi King Abdullah told the delegates that divisions among the Palestinians were more damaging to their cause of an independent state than the Israeli "enemy".

Delegates resolved not to resume Israeli–Palestinian peace talks until 14 preconditions were met. Among these preconditions were the release of all Israel-held Palestinian prisoners, a freeze on all Israeli settlement construction, and an end to the Gaza blockade.

By affirming its option for "armed resistance" against Israel, Fatah appealed to Palestinians who wanted a more hardline response to Israel.

Israeli deputy foreign minister Danny Ayalon said the conference was a "serious blow to peace" and "was another lost opportunity for the Palestinian leadership to adopt moderate views."

==== Elections to Central Committee and Revolutionary Council ====
On 9 August 2009, new members of the Central Committee of Fatah and the Revolutionary Council were chosen. Delegates voted to fill 18 seats on the 23-seat Central Committee, and 81 seats on the 128-seat Revolutionary Council after a week of deliberations. At least 70 new members entered the latter, with 20 seats going to Fatah representatives from the Gaza Strip, 11 seats filled by women (the highest number of votes went to one woman who spent years in Israeli jails for her role in the resistance), four seats went to Christians, and one was filled by a Jewish-born convert to Islam, Uri Davis, the first Jewish-born person to be elected to the Revolutionary Council since its founding in 1958. Fatah activists from the Palestinian diaspora were also represented and included Samir Rifai, Fatah's secretary in Syria, and Khaled Abu Usba.

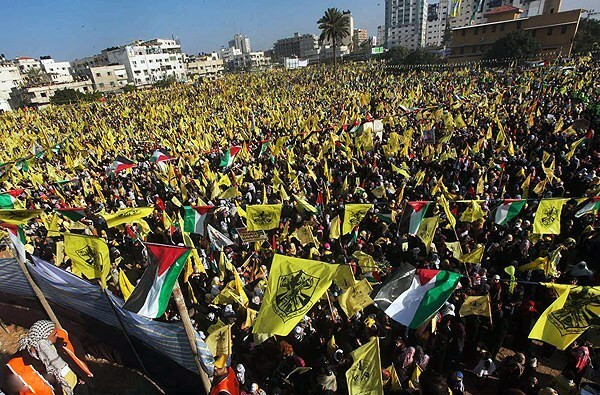
A demonstration in support of Fatah in Gaza City in January 2013

Elected to the central council was Fadwa Barghouti, the wife of Marwan Barghouti who was serving five life sentences in Israel for his role in terrorist attacks on civilians in Israel during the Second Intifada.

==== Reconciliation process with Hamas ====
A meeting of the Revolutionary Council was held in Ramallah from 18 to 19 October 2014. Many important questions were discussed, including reconciliation with Hamas. Opinion was divided on the issue.

==== 2016: Seventh Congress ====
In December 2016, more than 1400 members of Fatah's 7th Congress elected 18 members of the Central Committee and 80 for the Revolutionary Council. Six new members were added to the Central Committee while 12 were reelected. Outgoing members included Nabil Shaath, Nabil Abu Rudeineh, Zakaria al-Agha and Tayib Abdul Rahim.

Its leader Abu Ashraf Al-Armoushi and his comrades were killed in the Al-Basateen neighborhood of Ain Al-Helweh camp on 30 July 2023 during fighting.

==== 2026: Eighth Congress ====
Fatah's 8th congress began in Ramallah on May 14, 2026. At this congress, Mahmoud Abbas was reelected as Fatah chairman.

== Ideology ==
Fatah has member status at the Socialist International and observer status within the Party of European Socialists.

The November 1959 edition of Fatah's underground journal Filastinuna Nida al-Hayat indicated that the movement was motivated by the status of the Palestinian refugees in the Arab world:

The youth of the catastrophe (shibab al-nakba) are dispersed... Life in the tent has become as miserable as death... [T]o die for our beloved Motherland is better and more honorable than life, which forces us to eat our daily bread under humiliations or to receive it as charity at the cost of our honour... We, the sons of the catastrophe, are no longer willing to live this dirty, despicable life, this life which has destroyed our cultural, moral and political existence and destroyed our human dignity.

Armed struggle – as manifested in the 1936–39 Arab revolt in Palestine and the military role of Palestinian fighters under the leadership of Abd al-Qadir al-Husayni in the 1948 Arab–Israeli War – was central to Fatah's initial ideology of how to liberate Palestine.

== Structure ==
Fatah's two most important decision-making bodies are the Central Committee and Revolutionary Council. The Central Committee is mainly an executive body, while the Revolutionary Council is Fatah's legislative body.

=== Armed factions ===
Fatah has maintained a number of militant groups since its founding. Its mainstream military branch is al-'Asifah. Fatah is generally considered to have had a strong involvement in terrorism in the past, though unlike its rival Islamist faction Hamas, Fatah is no longer regarded as a terrorist organization by any government. Fatah used to be designated terrorist under Israeli law and was considered terrorist by the United States Department of State and United States Congress until it renounced terrorism in 1988.

Fatah has, since its inception, created, led or sponsored a number of armed groups and militias, some of which have had an official standing as the movement's armed wing, and some of which have not been publicly or even internally recognized as such. The group has also dominated various PLO and Palestinian Authority forces and security services which were/are not officially tied to Fatah, but in practice have served as wholly pro-Fatah armed units, and been staffed largely by members. The original name for Fatah's armed wing was al-'Asifah ('The Storm'), and this was also the name Fatah first used in its communiques, trying for some time to conceal its identity. This name has since been applied more generally to Fatah armed forces, and does not correspond to a single unit today. Other militant groups associated with Fatah include:

- Force 17, which played a role akin to the Presidential Guard for senior Fatah leaders. Created by Arafat.
- Black September Organization, a group formed by leading Fatah members in 1971, following the events of Black September in Jordan, to organize clandestine attacks with which Fatah did not want to be openly associated. These included strikes against leading Jordanian politicians as a means of exacting vengeance and raising the price for attacking the Palestinian movement; and also, most controversially, for "international operations" (e.g. the Munich Olympics massacre), intended to put pressure on the US, Europe and Israel, to raise the visibility of the Palestinian cause and to upstage radical rivals such as the PFLP. Fatah publicly disassociated itself from the group, but it is widely believed that it enjoyed Arafat's direct or tacit backing. It was discontinued in 1973–1974, as Fatah's political line shifted again, and the Black September operations and the strategy behind them were seen as having become a political liability, rather than an asset.
- Fatah Hawks, an armed militia active mainly until the mid-1990s.
- Tanzim, a branch of Fatah under the leadership of Marwan Barghouti, with roots in the activism of the First Intifada, which carried out armed attacks in the early days of the Second Intifada. It was later subsumed or sidelined by the al-Aqsa Martyrs' Brigades.
- Al-Aqsa Martyrs' Brigades, created during the Second Intifada to bolster the organization's militant standing vis-à-vis the rival Hamas movement, which had taken the lead in attacks on Israel after 1993, and was gaining rapidly in popularity with the advent of the Intifada. The Brigades are locally organized and have been said to suffer from poor cohesion and internal discipline, at times ignoring ceasefires and other initiatives announced by the central Fatah leadership. They are generally seen as tied to the "young guard" of Fatah politics, organizing young members on the street level, but it is not clear that they form a faction in themselves inside Fatah politics; rather, different Brigades units may be tied to different Fatah factional leaders.

During the Second Intifada, the group was a member of the Palestinian National and Islamic Forces.

=== Constitution ===
In August 2009, at Fatah's Sixth General Conference in Bethlehem, Fatah delegates drew up a new "internal charter".

== Leaders' electoral performance ==
=== Presidential elections ===
Election year	Candidate(s)	Votes	%	Result
1996	Yasser Arafat	643,079	89.82	✓ Victory
2005	Mahmoud Abbas	501,448	67.38	✓ Victory

=== Legislative Council ===
Election	Leading candidate	Votes	%	Seats	+/–	Position
1996	Yasser Arafat	1,085,593	30.90	50 / 88	New	1st
2006	Faruq al-Qaddumi	410,554	41.43	45 / 132	5	2nd

== See also ==
- Israeli–Palestinian conflict
- List of Fatah members
- List of political parties in the Palestinian National Authority
- Palestinian political violence

== Bibliography ==
- Aburish, Said (1998). Arafat, From Defender to Dictator. New York: Bloomsbury Publishing. ISBN 978-1-58234-049-4. OCLC 61189464.
- Seale, Patrick (1992). Abu Nidal: a gun for hire. Random House. ISBN 978-0-679-40066-0. OCLC 24628222.
- Baumgarten, Helga (2005). "The three faces/phases of Palestinian nationalism, 1948–2005". Journal of Palestine Studies. 34 (4): 25–48. doi:10.1525/jps.2005.34.4.25.
- Haghshenas, Seyyed Ali, "Social and political structure of Lebanon and its influence on [the] appearance of [the] Amal Movement", Tehran, Iran, 2009.
