= 2027 Palestinian presidential election =

Next Palestinian presidential election
- 11 September 2027
- Opinion polls
Incumbent President
Mahmoud Abbas
Fatah

Presidential elections are scheduled to be held in Palestine on 11 September 2027 per a decree which was issued in October 2026 by President Mahmoud Abbas. Prior to this, they were most recently scheduled to be held on 31 July 2021 per a presidential decree on 15 January 2021. However, they were subsequently postponed indefinitely. The elections were to follow the legislative elections, which were to take place on 22 May 2021 but were also postponed. Hamas had welcomed the proposed elections, as had the UN and the EU, and a number of countries. Hamas, Fatah, and other groups agreed in 2021 on the "mechanisms" for the elections, including an electoral court and commitments to open voting.

The legislative election is also scheduled to be held on the same day.

== Background ==
Mahmoud Abbas was elected President of the Palestinian National Authority (PA) on 9 January 2005 for a four-year term that ended on 9 January 2009. The last elections for the Palestinian Legislative Council (PLC) were held on 25 January 2006. There have not been any elections either for president or for the PLC since these two elections, with elections in the PA since those dates having only been for local offices.

=== Disputes between Fatah and Hamas ===
In September 2008, it was suggested that Abbas' term be extended one year or that the Palestinian Legislative Council be dissolved a year early in order for both elections be held simultaneously. Hamas objected to holding simultaneous elections, arguing that the presidential election should have been held in January 2009 and the parliamentary elections in 2010. Hamas also claimed that the PLC speaker, Aziz al-Dewik, who is a Hamas member, became the Palestinian president after Abbas' term ended on 9 January 2009, until new elections are held.

Fatah argued that elections should have been held in January 2010, since the Palestinian election law calls for presidential and legislative council elections to be held simultaneously, four years after the date of the later. Since the PLC elections were held in 2006 (a year after the presidential election), new elections for both should have been held in January 2010. In reconciliation talks held in Cairo, Egypt, in March 2009, Hamas and Fatah agreed to hold the elections by 25 January 2010. In the end, because of the Fatah–Hamas conflict, the issue of new elections remained unresolved. In February 2010, local government elections were called in the West Bank and the Gaza Strip for July 2010.

The West Bank Palestinian government decided to postpone the presidential and PLC elections, arguing that it wanted to safeguard "national unity". In December 2010, the Palestinian High Court of Justice ruled that once cabinet calls elections, it does not have authority to cancel them. After being postponed several times the local government elections took place in October and November 2012 and covered only the West Bank.

=== Attempts to resolve election issues ===
Presidential and parliamentary election to the Palestinian Authority were postponed several times because of intra-Palestinian political disputes between Fatah and Hamas, from the original date of 17 July 2010. In February 2011, following the resignation of Saeb Erekat as chief negotiator with Israel for the Israeli–Palestinian peace process following the release of the Palestine Papers, which were harshly critical of the PLO's concessions, the PLO Executive Committee announced intentions to hold elections before October. Abbas's followed the announcement with calls for "the spirit of change in Egypt" to inspire Palestinian unity. His aide Yasser Abed Rabbo said: "The Palestinian leadership decided to hold presidential and legislative elections within September. It urges all the sides to put their differences aside."

In February 2011, Fawzi Barhoum, a Hamas spokesman, said Abbas does not have the legitimacy to call the election. "Hamas will not take part in this election. We will not give it legitimacy. And we will not recognize the results." In October 2011, Abbas sent a proposal to Hamas for another general election, preferably to be held in early 2012. It was suggested that Hamas would be more willing to participate in another election following the Gilad Shalit prisoner exchange, which boosted Hamas' standing in Gaza. In November 2011, an election date on 4 May 2012 was preliminarily agreed on. However, due to further bickering, the election could not be held by that date.

On 20 December 2013, Hamas called on the Palestinian Authority to form a six-month national unity government that would finally hold the long-delayed general election. Following the upgrade of the UN status of Palestine to non-member observer state, it was proposed that general state elections would follow in 2013, in line with unity talks of Fatah and Hamas. In April 2014, an agreement was reached between Fatah and Hamas to form a unity government, which took place on 2 June 2014, and to hold general elections within 6 months of the agreement.

Elections had previously been scheduled for between February and March 2021. They had previously also been scheduled for April and October 2014, in accordance with the Fatah–Hamas Gaza Agreement of April 2014, but which were then delayed indefinitely. In October 2017, Hamas and Fatah signed a reconciliation deal in which Hamas agreed to dissolve the unity government in Gaza and hold general elections by the end of 2018, but the elections again were not held. Mahmoud Abbas announced on 26 September 2019 at a speech held at the UN General Assembly that he intends to set a date for elections once he returns to the West Bank.

Hamas responded by indicating that it is ready to hold "comprehensive and general elections", but on 6 November Hamas and Palestinian Islamic Jihad (PIJ) rejected Abbas's terms for holding elections, which required candidates to recognize the agreements signed by the PLO to be able to run. On 11 November 2019, Abbas said that there would be no new Palestinian elections unless they include east Jerusalem and the Gaza Strip. On 26 November 2019, Hamas confirmed that it had agreed with the Palestinian Central Elections Commission to participate in elections and that Hamas will not accept the exclusion of Jerusalem under any circumstances. Abbas announced in early December that elections will take place in a few months. On 10 December 2019, the Palestinian Authority asked Israel to allow East Jerusalem residents to vote in the planned elections, a request that Israeli officials said would go to the security cabinet.

The Palestinian Central Elections Commission (CEC) was to conduct the elections in 2021. CEC Chairman Hanna Nasir said on 16 January 2021 that "about two million Palestinians in Jerusalem, the West Bank, and Gaza Strip were eligible to vote." On 2 March 2021, after the expiration of the deadline for registration to vote, the CEC said that 2.6 million of the 2.8 million eligible voters in the West Bank and Gaza, 93% of the total, had registered to vote. It is not compulsory to register to vote nor actually to vote in Palestinian elections.

On 14 March 2021, a Palestinian Authority official said Arab residents of Jerusalem will participate in the Palestinian general elections; however, a senior Israeli government official said that no decision had yet been taken. Abbas and other Palestinian officials have said there would be no elections without the participation of Arab residents of Jerusalem. Blaming Israel for not agreeing to permit Palestinians resident in Jerusalem to vote, Abbas postponed the election on 29 April but did not set a new date. The postponement has been strongly criticised.

== Candidates ==
In early June 2008, Fatah had renominated Abbas as its candidate for the next presidential elections, although reports in December had suggested that he would not run for a second term. Rumours emerged again on 28 October 2009 of Abbas not running for another term; and on 5 November 2009, he publicly announced his intention not to seek reelection, though he said he would stay until the next presidential election.

=== Potential candidates ===
- Mahmoud Abbas (Fatah), incumbent president (2005–present)
- Yasser Abbas (Fatah), businessman and son of incumbent president Mahmoud Abbas
- Marwan Barghouti (Fatah), member of the Palestinian Legislative Council for the Fatah PR list (1996–present) (Note: Currently imprisoned in Israel.)
- Mustafa Barghouti (Palestinian National Initiative), physician, secretary-general of the Palestinian National Initiative (2002–present), member of the Palestinian Legislative Council for the Palestinian National Initiative PR list (2005–present), and runner-up in the 2005 presidential election
- Khalil al-Hayya (Hamas), chairman of the Hamas Political Bureau (2026–present) and member of the Palestinian Legislative Council for the Gaza Governorate (2005–present)
- Khaled Mashal (Hamas), former chairman of the Hamas Political Bureau (2024; 1996–2017)
- Hussein al-Sheikh (Fatah), incumbent vice president (2025–present)
Potential presidential candidates (Note: Individuals listed below have, as of August 2026, been mentioned as potential 2027 presidential candidates through either media sources or opinion polling.)
President
Mahmoud Abbas
of Fatah

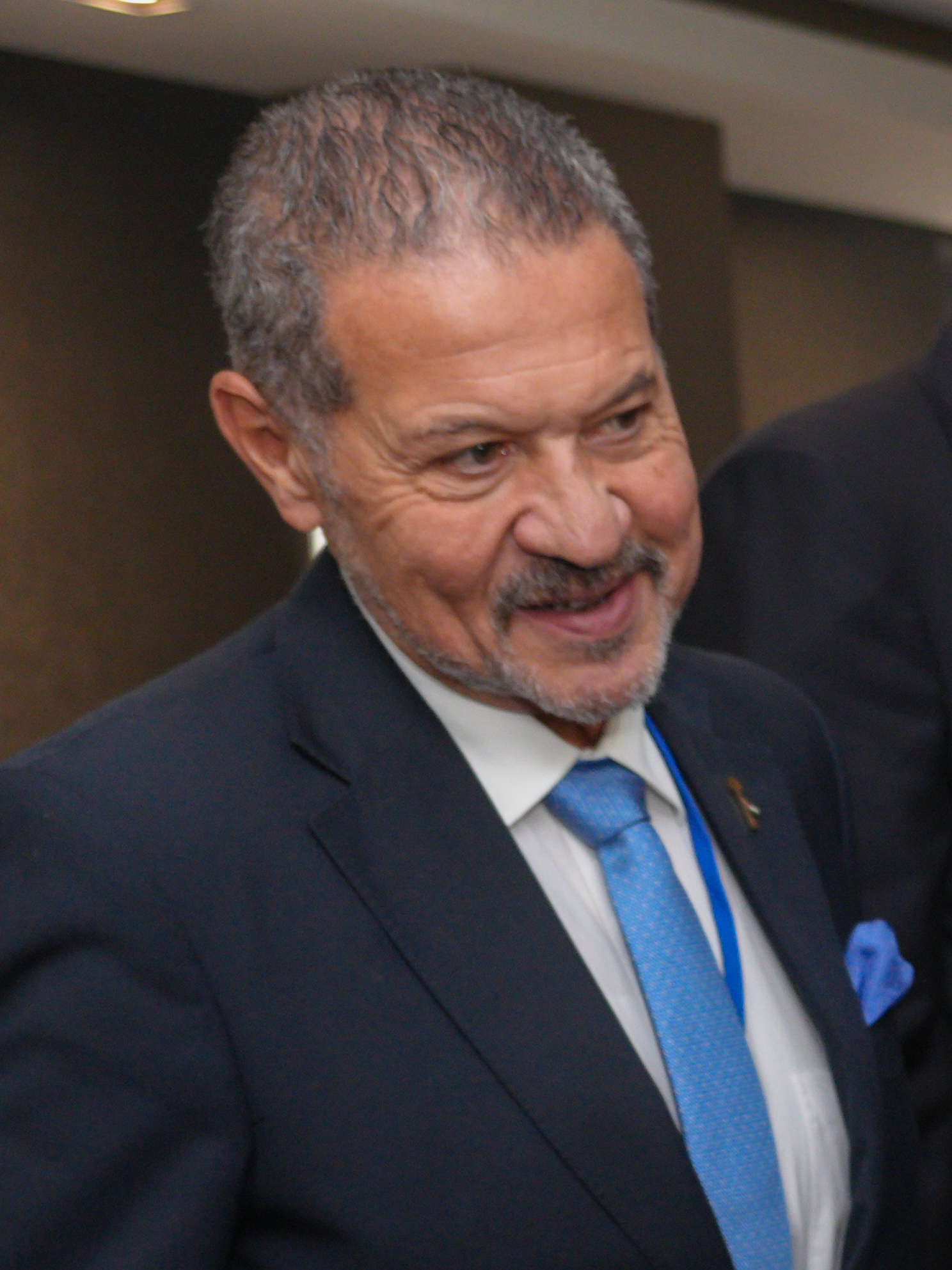
Businessman
Yasser Abbas
of Fatah

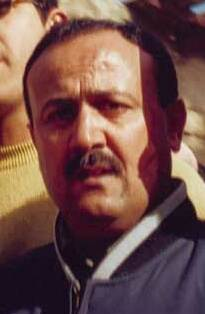
Member of the PLC
Marwan Barghouti
of Fatah

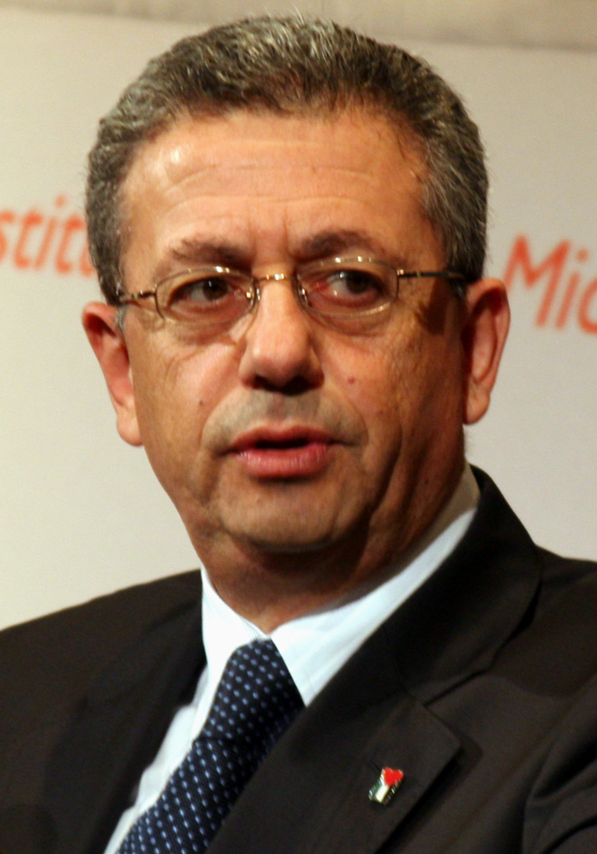
Member of the PLC
Mustafa Barghouti
of the PNI

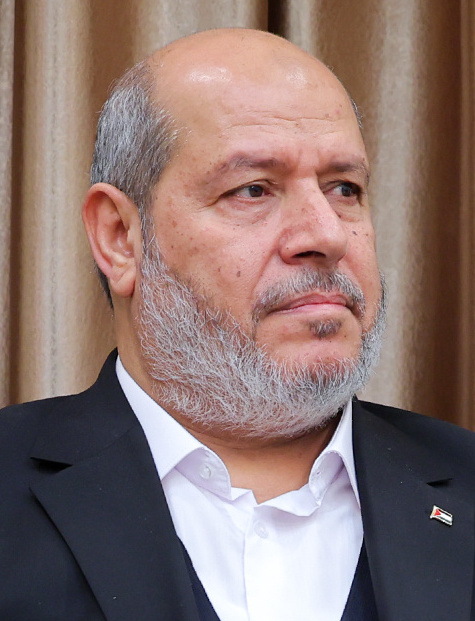
Member of the PLC
Khalil al-Hayya
of Hamas

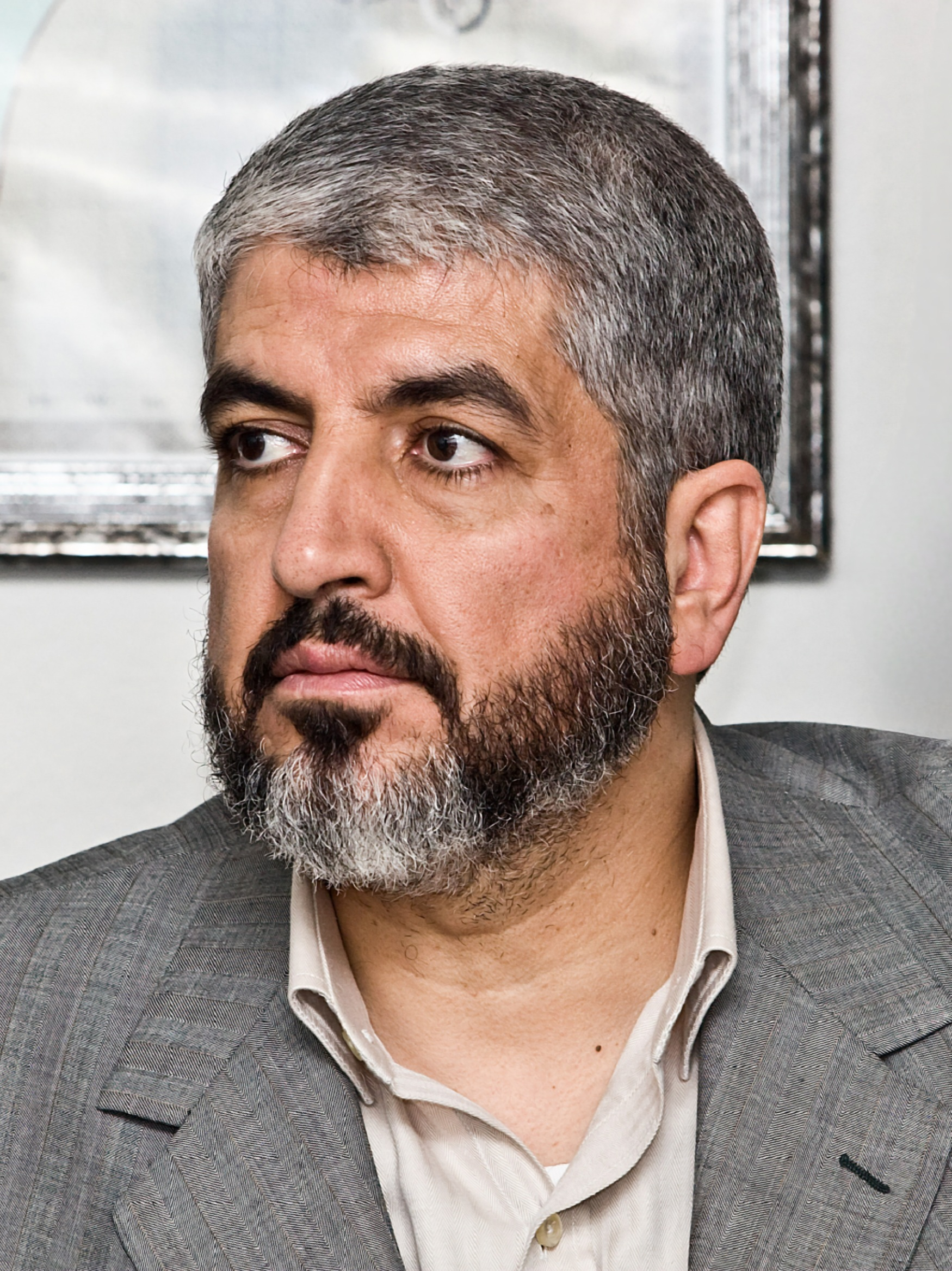
Former Chairman of the Hamas Political Bureau
Khaled Mashal
of Hamas

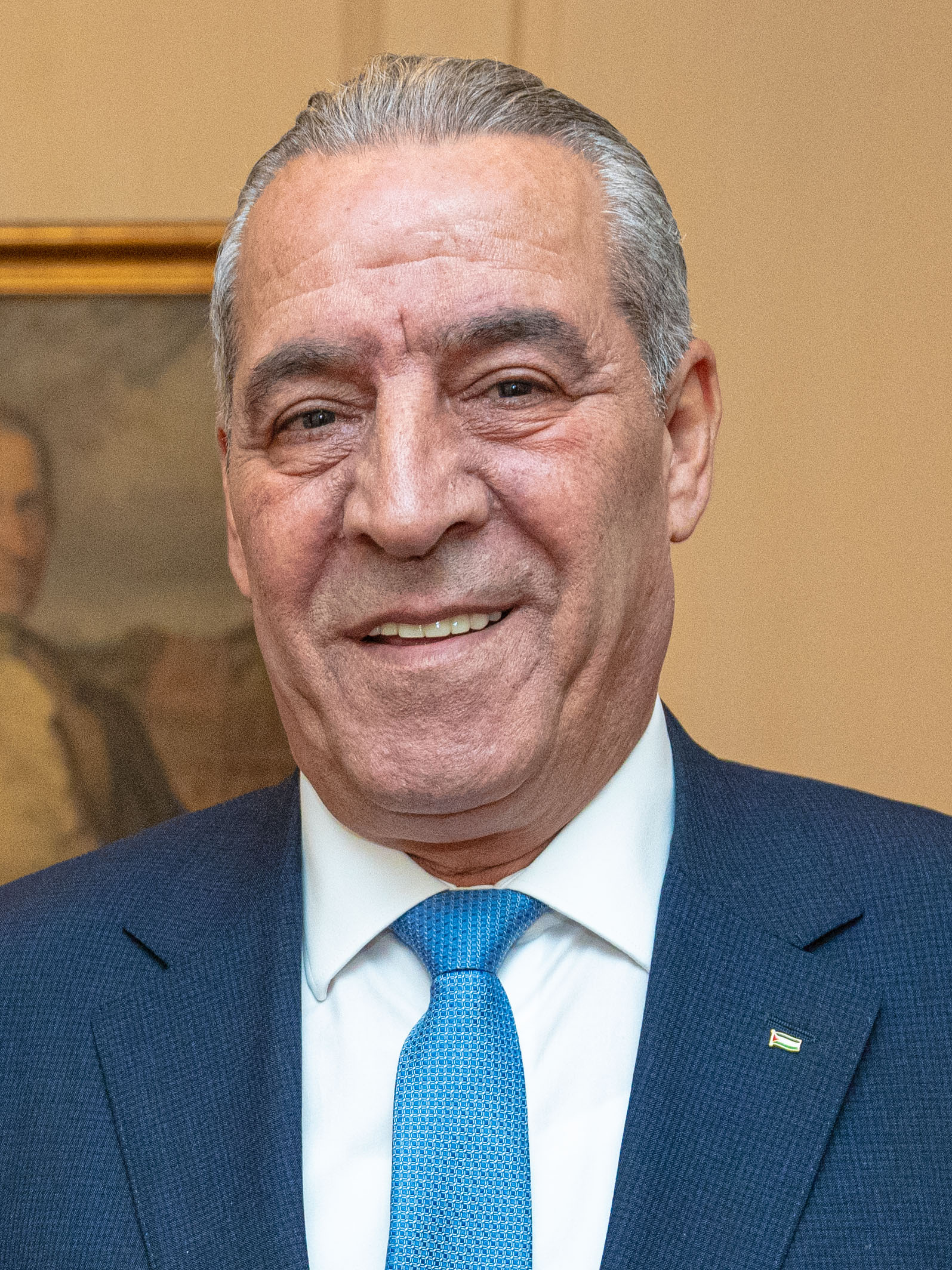
Vice President
Hussein al-Sheikh
of Fatah

== Opinion polls ==
Poll source	Date(s) administered	Sample size (Note: Key: A – all adults RV – registered voters LV – likely voters V – unclear) (Note: Refers to the total, "raw" sample size, including undecided and non-voters, and before demographic weighting is applied. Fractions in parentheses apply to rolling polls (see below) and indicate the proportion of the sample that is independent from the previous poll in the series.)	Mahmoud Abbas	Yasser Abbas	Marwan Barghouti	Hussein al-Sheikh	Ismail Haniyeh †	Khalil al-Hayya	Khaled Mashal	Yahya Sinwar †	Mustafa Barghouti	Und./ no ans./ NOTA	Will not vote	Margin of error (Note: In cases when linked poll details distinguish between the margin of error associated with the total sample of respondents (including undecided and non-voters) and that of the subsample of decided/leaning voters, the former is included in the table. Also not included is the margin of error from rounding to the nearest whole number or from other methodological sources. Most online polls (because of their opt-in method of recruiting panelists which results in a non-random sample) cannot have a margin of error. In such cases, this shows what the margin of error would be for a survey using a random, probability-based sample of equivalent size.)	Polling method (Note: "In-person" refers to polls conducted face-to-face with respondents; "telephone" refers to traditional telephone polls conducted by live interviewers; "IVR" refers to automated interactive voice response polls conducted by telephone; "online" refers to polls conducted exclusively over the internet; "telephone/online" refers to polls which combine results from both telephone and online surveys, or for which respondents are initially recruited by telephone and then asked to complete an online survey. "Rolling" polls contain overlapping data from one poll to the next.)
Palestinian Center for Policy and Survey Research	5–8 August 2026	1,270 (A)	9%	–	34%	–	–	17%	–	–	–	4%	36%	±3.5 pp	In-person
Palestinian Center for Policy and Survey Research	5–8 August 2026	– (Note: The exact number of participants who were considered likely voters was not disclosed.) (LV)	14%	–	54%	–	–	26%	–	–	–	6%	–	±3.5 pp	In-person
Palestinian Center for Policy and Survey Research	22-25 October 2025	1,200 (A)	9%	–	34%	–	–	–	24%	–	–	1%	32%	±3.5 pp	In-person
Palestinian Center for Policy and Survey Research	22-25 October 2025	– (LV)	13%	–	49%	–	–	–	36%	–	–	5%	–	±3.5 pp	In-person
Palestinian Center for Policy and Survey Research	1-4 May 2025	1,270 (A)	7%	–	32%	–	–	–	22%	–	–	2%	36%	±3.5 pp	In-person
Palestinian Center for Policy and Survey Research	1-4 May 2025	– (LV)	11%	–	50%	–	–	–	35%	–	–	4%	–	±3.5 pp	In-person
	16 October 2024	Death of Yahya Sinwar													
Palestinian Center for Policy and Survey Research	3-7 September 2024	1,200 (A)	6%	–	32%	–	–	–	–	31%	–	1%	30%	±3.5 pp	In-person
Palestinian Center for Policy and Survey Research	3-7 September 2024	– (LV)	9%	–	46%	–	–	–	–	44%	–	1%	–	±3.5 pp	In-person
	31 July 2024	Death of Ismail Haniyeh													
Palestinian Center for Policy and Survey Research	26 May – 1 June 2024	1,570 (A)	5%	–	42%	–	27%	–	–	–	–	2%	24%	±3.0 pp	In-person
Palestinian Center for Policy and Survey Research	26 May – 1 June 2024	– (LV)	6%	–	56%	–	36%	–	–	–	–	2%	–	±3.0 pp	In-person
Palestinian Center for Policy and Survey Research	5-10 March 2024	1,580 (A)	8%	–	40%	–	23%	–	–	–	–	1%	29%	±3.0 pp	In-person
Palestinian Center for Policy and Survey Research	5-10 March 2024	– (LV)	11%	–	56%	–	32%	–	–	–	–	1%	–	±3.0 pp	In-person
Palestinian Center for Policy and Survey Research	22 November – 2 December 2023	1,231 (A)	9%	–	26%	–	35%	–	–	–	–	2%	28%	±3.0 pp	In-person
Palestinian Center for Policy and Survey Research	22 November – 2 December 2023	– (LV)	7%	–	47%	–	43%	–	–	–	–	3%	–	±3.0 pp	In-person
	7 October 2023	Start of the Gaza war													
Palestinian Center for Policy and Survey Research	6-9 September 2023	1,270 (A)	8%	–	30%	–	22%	–	–	–	–	1%	38%	±3.0 pp	In-person
Palestinian Center for Policy and Survey Research	6-9 September 2023	– (LV)	13%	–	49%	–	36%	–	–	–	–	2%	–	±3.0 pp	In-person

Hypothetical polling

Mahmoud Abbas vs. Khaled Mashal

Poll source	Date(s) administered	Sample size	Mahmoud Abbas	Khaled Mashal	Und./ no ans./ NOTA	Will not vote	Margin of error	Polling method
Palestinian Center for Policy and Survey Research	22-25 October 2025	1,200 (A)	15%	34%	5%	47%	±3.5 pp	In-person
Palestinian Center for Policy and Survey Research	22-25 October 2025	– (LV)	27%	63%	10%	–	±3.5 pp	In-person
Palestinian Center for Policy and Survey Research	1-4 May 2025	1,270 (A)	12%	32%	3%	47%	±3.5 pp	In-person
Palestinian Center for Policy and Survey Research	1-4 May 2025	– (LV)	25%	68%	7%	–	±3.5 pp	In-person

Marwan Barghouti vs. Khaled Mashal

Poll source	Date(s) administered	Sample size	Marwan Barghouti	Khaled Mashal	Und./ no ans./ NOTA	Will not vote	Margin of error	Polling method
Palestinian Center for Policy and Survey Research	22-25 October 2025	1,200 (A)	39%	26%	2%	34%	±3.5 pp	In-person
Palestinian Center for Policy and Survey Research	22-25 October 2025	– (LV)	58%	39%	3%	–	±3.5 pp	In-person
Palestinian Center for Policy and Survey Research	1-4 May 2025	1,270 (A)	36%	24%	2%	38%	±3.5 pp	In-person
Palestinian Center for Policy and Survey Research	1-4 May 2025	– (LV)	58%	39%	3%	–	±3.5 pp	In-person

Mahmoud Abbas vs. Yahya Sinwar

Poll source	Date(s) administered	Sample size	Mahmoud Abbas	Yahya Sinwar	Und./ no ans./ NOTA	Will not vote	Margin of error	Polling method
	16 October 2024	Death of Yahya Sinwar						
Palestinian Center for Policy and Survey Research	3-7 September 2024	1,200 (A)	13%	41%	1%	44%	±3.5 pp	In-person
Palestinian Center for Policy and Survey Research	3-7 September 2024	– (LV)	24%	74%	2%	–	±3.5 pp	In-person

Marwan Barghouti vs. Yahya Sinwar

Poll source	Date(s) administered	Sample size	Marwan Barghouti	Yahya Sinwar	Und./ no ans./ NOTA	Will not vote	Margin of error	Polling method
	16 October 2024	Death of Yahya Sinwar						
Palestinian Center for Policy and Survey Research	3-7 September 2024	1,200 (A)	35%	32%	1%	32%	±3.5 pp	In-person
Palestinian Center for Policy and Survey Research	3-7 September 2024	– (LV)	52%	47%	1%	–	±3.5 pp	In-person

Mahmoud Abbas vs. Ismail Haniyeh

Poll source	Date(s) administered	Sample size	Mahmoud Abbas	Ismail Haniyeh	Und./ no ans./ NOTA	Will not vote	Margin of error	Polling method
	31 July 2024	Death of Ismail Haniyeh						
Palestinian Center for Policy and Survey Research	26 May – 1 June 2024	1,570 (A)	11%	43%	2%	43%	±3.0 pp	In-person
Palestinian Center for Policy and Survey Research	26 May – 1 June 2024	– (LV)	20%	70%	10%	–	±3.0 pp	In-person
Palestinian Center for Policy and Survey Research	5-10 March 2024	1,580 (A)	11%	37%	4%	48%	±3.0 pp	In-person
Palestinian Center for Policy and Survey Research	5-10 March 2024	– (LV)	22%	70%	8%	–	±3.0 pp	In-person
Palestinian Center for Policy and Survey Research	22 November-2 December 2023	1,231 (A)	8%	41%	3%	47%	±3.0 pp	In-person
Palestinian Center for Policy and Survey Research	22 November-2 December 2023	– (LV)	16%	78%	6%	–	±3.0 pp	In-person
	7 October 2023	Start of the Gaza war						
Palestinian Center for Policy and Survey Research	6-9 September 2023	1,270 (A)	16%	24%	2%	58%	±3.0 pp	In-person
Palestinian Center for Policy and Survey Research	6-9 September 2023	– (LV)	37%	58%	5%	–	±3.0 pp	In-person

Marwan Barghouti vs. Ismail Haniyeh

Poll source	Date(s) administered	Sample size	Marwan Barghouti	Ismail Haniyeh	Und./ no ans./ NOTA	Will not vote	Margin of error	Polling method
	31 July 2024	Death of Ismail Haniyeh						
Palestinian Center for Policy and Survey Research	26 May – 1 June 2024	1,570 (A)	44%	29%	2%	26%	±3.0 pp	In-person
Palestinian Center for Policy and Survey Research	26 May – 1 June 2024	– (LV)	59%	39%	2%	–	±3.0 pp	In-person
Palestinian Center for Policy and Survey Research	5-10 March 2024	1,580 (A)	42%	26%	1%	31%	±3.0 pp	In-person
Palestinian Center for Policy and Survey Research	5-10 March 2024	– (LV)	62%	37%	1%	–	±3.0 pp	In-person
Palestinian Center for Policy and Survey Research	22 November-2 December 2023	1,231 (A)	35%	31%	3%	31%	±3.0 pp	In-person
Palestinian Center for Policy and Survey Research	22 November-2 December 2023	– (LV)	51%	45%	4%	–	±3.0 pp	In-person
	7 October 2023	Start of the Gaza war						
Palestinian Center for Policy and Survey Research	6-9 September 2023	1,270 (A)	36%	22%	1%	41%	±3.0 pp	In-person
Palestinian Center for Policy and Survey Research	6-9 September 2023	– (LV)	60%	37%	3%	–	±3.0 pp	In-person

== See also ==
- 2026 Palestinian legislative election
