= 2027 Palestinian legislative election =

- 11 September 2027
- All 200 seats in the Palestinian Legislative Council; 101 seats needed for a majority
Party	Leader	Current seats
Hamas	Khalil al-Hayya	74
Fatah	Mahmoud Abbas (Note: Abbas serves as both President of the Palestinian National Authority and President of the State of Palestine.)	45
PFLP	Ahmad Sa'adat (Note: Sa'adat is detained in Israel.)	3
PNI	Mustafa Barghouti	2
Third Way	Salam Fayyad	2
DFLP	Nayef Hawatmeh (Note: Hawatmeh lives in exile in Syria.)	1 (Note: As a member of The Alternative)
PPP	Bassam as-Salhi	1 (Note: As a member of The Alternative)
Independents	–	4
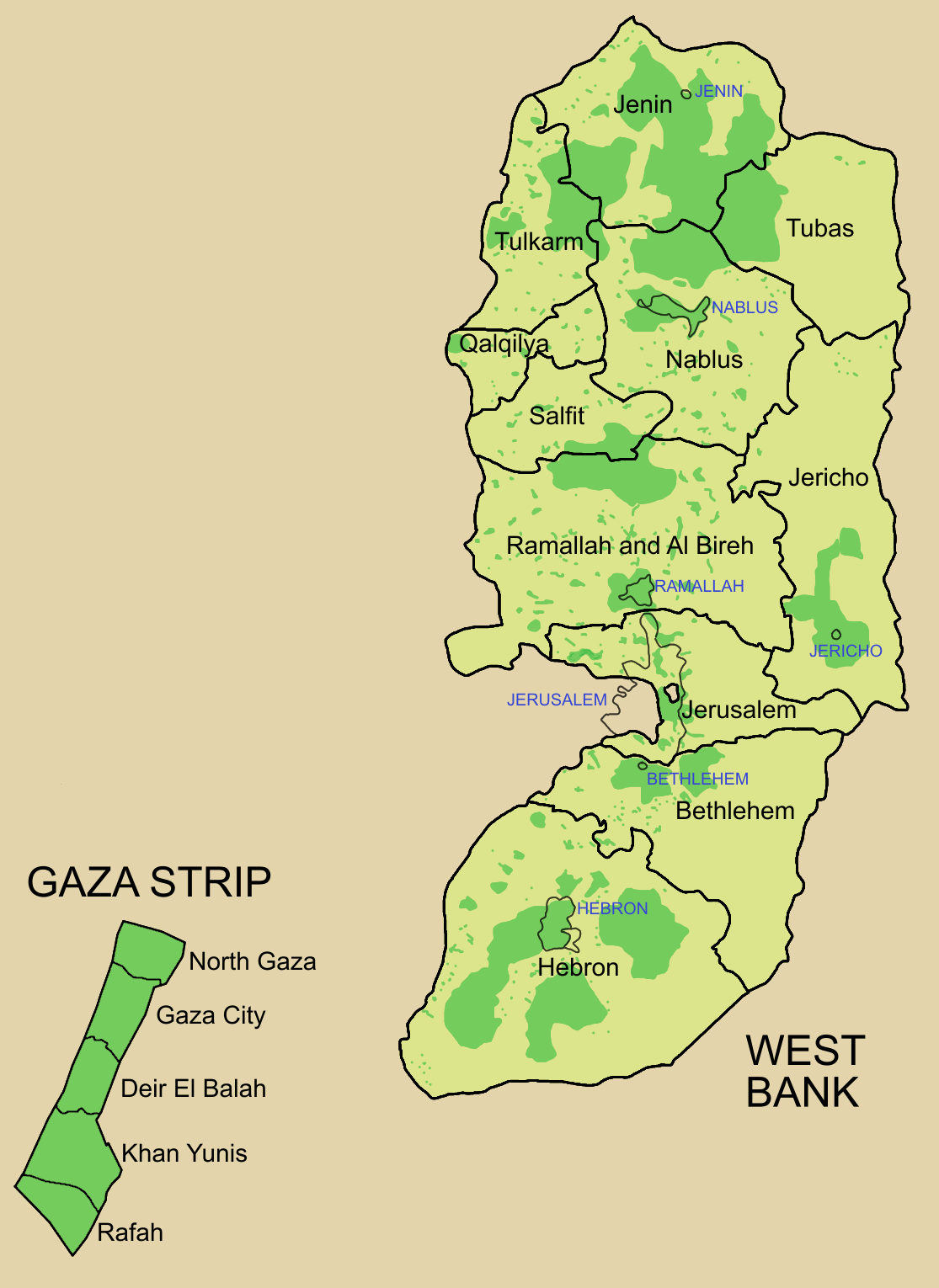
Election districts
Incumbent Prime Minister
Mohammad Mustafa; Independent

Legislative elections are scheduled to be held in Palestine on 11 September 2027 in order to elect the 3rd Palestinian Legislative Council (PLC). They were previously scheduled for 28 November 2026 by President Mahmoud Abbas, but were postponed on 10 October 2026. An earlier election had been set for 22 May 2021 under a decree issued by Abbas on 15 January 2021, but was postponed on 29 April 2021.

The presidential election is also scheduled to be held on the same day.

== Background ==
Mahmoud Abbas was elected President of the Palestinian National Authority in January 2005 for a four-year term that ended in January 2009. The last elections for the Palestinian Legislative Council (PLC) were held on 25 January 2006. Elections since these dates have only been for local offices.

In February 2007, Saudi-sponsored negotiations led to the Hamas & Fatah Mecca Agreement signed by Abbas on behalf of Fatah and Khaled Mashal on behalf of Hamas to form a unity government. In March, the PLC established a national unity government, with 83 representatives voting in favour and three against. Government ministers were sworn in by Abbas, the chairman of the Palestinian Authority, at a ceremony held simultaneously in Gaza and Ramallah.

However, in June, renewed fighting broke out between Hamas and Fatah. In the course of the 2007 Battle of Gaza, Hamas exploited the near total collapse of Palestinian Authority forces in Gaza and seized control of the territory, ousting Fatah officials. Abbas then dismissed the Hamas-led PA government and outlawed the Hamas militia.

In September, Fatah unilaterally changed the electoral laws of 2005 from the PLC being electing half of its seats proportionally and the other half by first past the post to complete proportional representation. Abbas he could issue the change by decree as long as the PLC was unable to convene. Hamas, which had a majority on the PLC, declared the move illegal.

By 2010, the security and economic situation of the residents of Gaza had deteriorated dramatically. With financial backing from Iran, Hamas launched thousands of rockets at Israel. It expressed interest in taking control of the West Bank and stated its intent to use the elections as a means to weaken President Abbas.

Abbas issued a decree stating that at least one in three people on an electoral list must be a woman, that candidates as young as 23 could now run for office, and for the number of seats in the PLC to increase to 200. The electoral threshold was also lowered to 1%.

=== Attempts to resolve election issue ===
In February 2010, local government elections were called in the West Bank and the Gaza Strip for July 2010. The PA decided to postpone the elections, claiming it wanted to safeguard "national unity". In December 2010, the Palestinian High Court of Justice ruled that once the cabinet called elections, it did not have authority to cancel them. In the end, local elections were held in October and November 2012 and covered only the West Bank.

In February 2011, following the resignation of Saeb Erekat as chief negotiator with Israel for the Israeli–Palestinian peace process after the release of the Palestine Papers, which were harshly critical of the PLO's concessions, the PLO Executive Committee announced intentions to hold elections before October.

Hamas responded that "Hamas will not take part in this election. . . . we will not recognize the results." In October 2011, Abbas sent a proposal to Hamas for another general election, preferably to be held in early 2012. It was suggested that Hamas would be more willing to participate in another election following the Gilad Shalit prisoner exchange, which boosted Hamas' standing in Gaza. Nonetheless, the election was not held.

In December 2013, Hamas called on the Palestinian Authority to form a six-month national unity government that would finally hold the long-delayed general election. Following the upgrade of the UN status of Palestine to non-member observer state, it was proposed that general state elections would follow in 2013, in line with unity talks of Fatah and Hamas. In April 2014, an agreement was reached to form a unity government, which occurred on 2 June 2014, and for the election to take place within 6 months. However, elections were again postponed.

In October 2017, Hamas and Fatah signed a reconciliation deal in which Hamas agreed to dissolve the unity government in Gaza and hold general elections by the end of 2018, but also did not come to pass. Mahmoud Abbas announced in a September 2019 in a speech at the UN General Assembly that he intended to set a date for elections once he returned to the West Bank. Hamas responded by indicating that it was ready to hold "comprehensive and general elections", but in November, Hamas and Palestinian Islamic Jihad rejected Abbas's terms for holding elections (which required candidates to recognize the agreements signed by the PLO to be able to run).

==== Suspension of 2021 planned elections ====
In November 2019, Abbas said that there would be no new Palestinian elections unless they include East Jerusalem and the Gaza Strip, a position Hamas affirmed the same month. In September 2020, Fatah and Hamas agreed on elections between February and March 2021.

The EU requested permission from Israel to observe the elections in Jerusalem, but later reported that Israeli authorities did not agree. On 29 April 2021, ahead of a scheduled leadership meeting, Hamas rejected the idea of postponing elections and refused to attend the meeting amid speculation that Abbas would seek to delay or cancel them. However, on the same day, Abbas announced the indefinite postponement of elections, citing Israel's refusal to permit East Jerusalem residents to vote. (Note: In the lead up to the election, Fatah split into three candidate lists for the election: an official list of candidates backed by Abbas, a list led by a leader of the First and Second Intifada Marwan Barghouti, and a list led by former Fatah security official Mohammad Dahlan. Opinion polling in March gave Abbas's list a quarter of the total vote, with the two Fatah breakaway lists a little short of a quarter between them.)

===== Reactions =====
The leaders of the two alternative Fatah candidate lists, Marwan Barghouti and Mohammad Dahlan, stated that Abbas was most concerned about the possibility of defeat by the breakaway Fatah factions or by Hamas. Hamas called the step a "a coup against the path of national partnership and consensus," and EU foreign policy chief Josep Borrell stated that it was “deeply disappointing,” while reiterating its ask for Israel to permit East Jerusalem residents to vote.

A poll by the Palestinian Center for Policy and Survey Research in June 2021 found that 69% of residents wanted to hold elections soon, even without Israeli approval in East Jerusalem.

==== Postponement of 2026 elections ====
On 10 October 2026, the elections planned to be held on 27 November were officially postponed by Mahmoud Abbas to 11 September 2027, citing "obstacles posed by Israeli measures". Israel's foreign minister, Gideon Sa'ar, rejected Abbas' claims as a "ridiculous lie designated to evade responsibility and accountability", noting that the previous election was held 20 years ago.

France regretted the decision and urged Abbas to reverse it, warning that "Palestinian democratic renewal is inseparable from preserving the two-state solution". In a joint statement, Australia, Canada, France and the United Kingdom rejected the postponement of the elections.

== Parties ==
The window for candidate submissions ahead of the planned November election opened on 26 September and were scheduled to close on 7 October. An alliance was formed between Hamas, Mohammed Dahlan and Palestinian Islamic Jihad in late September. Alliance negotiations previously included Nasser al-Qudwa and the Reformist Current within Fatah.

== Campaign issues ==
In August 2026, PCPSR conducted a poll ahead of the legislative elections showing the top priorities among the Palestinian population. The issues are unifying the West Bank and Gaza Strip (19%), stopping the killing in the Gaza Strip (18%), improving the economic situation (15%), rebuilding Gaza (11%), confronting settler terrorism (10%), and combating corruption (9%).

== Opinion polls ==
=== All voting respondents ===
Fieldwork dates	Polling firm	Fatah	Hamas	PFLP	PNI	Third Way	DFLP	PPP	Undecided/ Other	Lead
5–8 August 2026	PCPSR	32	29	18					21	3
22–25 October 2025	PCPSR	30	44	10					16	14
10 October 2025	Gaza peace plan goes into effect									
1–4 May 2025	PCPSR	28	43	8					19	15
3–7 September 2024	PCPSR	27	45	5					22	18
26 May – 1 June 2024	PCPSR	25	46	6					21	21
5–10 March 2024	PCPSR	22	47	9					24	25
22 November – 2 December 2023	PCPSR	19	51	4					26	32
7 October 2023	Start of Gaza war									
6–9 September 2023	PCPSR	34	36	9					21	2
7–11 June 2023	PCPSR	31	34	11					23	3
8–11 March 2023	PCPSR	35	33	9					22	2
7–10 December 2022	PCPSR	34	34	10					21	Tie
13–17 September 2022	PCPSR	34	32	12					22	2
22–25 June 2022	PCPSR	35	36	7					20	1
16–20 March 2022	PCPSR	42	36	8					14	6
8–11 December 2021	PCPSR	35	38	9					18	3
October 2021	JMCC	34.3	10.2	1	0.4	—N/a	0.3	0.4	53.4	24.1
15–18 September 2021	PCPSR	32	37	13					18	5
9–12 June 2021	PCPSR	30	41	12					17	11
22 May 2021	Election scheduled for 22 May 2021, indefinitely postponed on 29 April 2021									
14–19 March 2021	PCPSR	43	30	8					18	13
8–11 December 2020	PCPSR	38	34	10					19	4
9–12 September 2020	PCPSR	38	34	8					20	4
17–20 June 2020	PCPSR	36	34	8					23	2
5–8 February 2020	PCPSR	38	32	12					18	6
11–14 December 2019	PCPSR	40	32	10					20	8
11–14 September 2019	PCPSR	38	29	11					23	9
27–30 June 2019	PCPSR	39	30	10					21	9
13–16 March 2019	PCPSR	39	32	8					18	7
12–16 December 2018	PCPSR	35	34	10					21	1
5–8 September 2018	PCPSR	36	27	10					28	9
25 June – 1 July 2018	PCPSR	39	32	9					20	7
14–17 March 2018	PCPSR	36	31	9					25	5

=== Decided voters only ===

Polling firm	Fieldwork Dates	Fatah	Hamas	Other	Lead	Link
PCPSR	5–8 August 2026	41%	37%	23%	4%	
PCPSR	22–25 October 2025	36%	52%	12%	16%	
	10 October 2025	Gaza peace plan goes into effect				
PCPSR	26 May – 1 June 2024	32%	60%	8%	28	
PCPSR	5–10 March 2024	28%	60%	12%	32	
PCPSR	22 November – 2 December 2023	26%	69%	5%	43	
	7 October 2023	Start of Gaza war				
PCPSR	6–9 September 2023	43%	46%	11%	3	
PCPSR	7–11 June 2023	41%	45%	14%	4	
PCPSR	8–11 March 2023	45%	43%	12%	2	
PCPSR	7–10 December 2022	44%	44%	13%	Tie	
PCPSR	13–17 September 2022	44%	41%	15%	3	
PCPSR	22–25 June 2022	45%	46%	9%	1	
PCPSR	16–20 March 2022	49%	42%	9%	7	
PCPSR	8–11 December 2021	43%	46%	11%	3	
JMCC	October 2021	74%	22%	5%	52	
PCPSR	15–18 September 2021	39%	45%	16%	6	
PCPSR	9–12 June 2021	36%	49%	14%	13	
	29 April 2021	Elections indefinitely postponed				
PCPSR	14–19 March 2021	53%	37%	10%	16	
PCPSR	8–11 December 2020	46%	41%	12%	5	
PCPSR	9–12 September 2020	48%	43%	10%	5	
PCPSR	17–20 June 2020	46%	44%	10%	3	
PCPSR	5–8 February 2020	46%	39%	15%	7	
PCPSR	11–14 December 2019	49%	39%	12%	10	
PCPSR	11–14 September 2019	49%	37%	14%	12	
PCPSR	27–30 June 2019	49%	38%	13%	11	
PCPSR	13–16 March 2019	49%	41%	10%	9	
PCPSR	12–16 December 2018	44%	43%	13%	1	
PCPSR	5–8 September 2018	49%	37%	14%	12	
PCPSR	25 June –1 July 2018	49%	40%	11%	9	
PCPSR	14–17 March 2018	47%	41%	12%	7	

== See also ==
- 2027 Palestinian presidential election

== Sources ==
- Clauset, Aaron; Heger, Lindsay; Young, Maxwell; Gleditsch, Kristian Skrede (March 2010). "The strategic calculus of terrorism: Substitution and competition in the Israel-Palestine conflict". Cooperation and Conflict. 45 (1): 6–33. doi:10.1177/0010836709347113. JSTOR 45084592. S2CID 2091170.
- Cordesman, Anthony H. (2002). Peace and War: The Arab–Israeli Military Balance Enters the 21st Century. Greenwood Publishing Group. ISBN 978-0-275-96939-4.
- Mattar, Philip (2005). Encyclopedia of the Palestinians. Infobase Publishing. pp. 195–. ISBN 978-0-8160-6986-6.
- Milton-Edwards, Beverley; Farrell, Stephen (2013). Hamas: The Islamic Resistance Movement. John Wiley & Sons. ISBN 978-0-745-65468-3.
