= Suha Arafat =

Widow of Yasser Arafat

First Lady of the Palestinian National Authority
- In role 5 July 1994 – 11 November 2004
- President: Yasser Arafat
- Succeeded by: Amina Abbas

Personal details
- Born: Suha Daoud Tawil; 17 July 1963 (age 63) Jerusalem
- Spouse: Yasser Arafat (m. 1990; died 2004)
- Children: 1
- Parent(s): Raymonda Tawil; Daoud Tawil

Suha Arafat (Arabic: سهى عرفات; born Suha Daoud Tawil (Arabic: سهى داود الطويل) on 17 July 1963) is the widow of former Palestinian National Authority president Yasser Arafat.

== Early life and education ==
Suha was born in Jerusalem on 17 July 1963 into an affluent Roman Catholic family who lived in Nablus and then Ramallah (both cities under Jordanian rule at the time). Suha's father Daoud Tawil, an Oxford-educated banker, was born in Jaffa (now part of Tel Aviv). Daoud Tawil had business both in the West Bank and Jordan.

Suha's mother, Raymonda Hawa Tawil, born in Acre, is a member of the Hawa family of Acre, prominent property owners in the Haifa area. She was a poet and writer. She became a Palestinian political activist after 1967 and was arrested several times by the Israelis, making her a media star. She was also a high-profile Palestinian journalist. Suha, growing up in Ramallah, was influenced by the political activism of her mother conducted in the 1970s from her PLO-influenced news bureau in East Jerusalem.

Suha attended a convent school, Rosary Sisters' School, in Beit Hanina, Jerusalem. At age 18, she went to Paris to study, where she lived with her older sister, who was married to Ibrahim Souss, the PLO's then-ambassador to France.

== Marriage to Arafat ==
Soon after his departure from Paris, Arafat asked Suha to come and work with him in Tunisia (where the Palestine Liberation Organization had set up a haven). Suha secretly married Arafat on 17 July 1990, when she was aged 27 and he was 61. Their only child, daughter Zahwa, was born on 24 July 1995 in Neuilly-sur-Seine, France. Zahwa was named after Arafat's mother.

Suha converted to Islam at the time of her marriage. However, many Palestinians believe her conversion to be false and allege that Suha has had millions of dollars channeled into secret bank accounts by her late husband, both of which she denies. During her marriage, she tried to leave Arafat on many occasions to escape the gossip aimed at her, but was not permitted to.

In November 1999 in a speech given in Ramallah in the presence of then First Lady Hillary Clinton, Suha Arafat falsely claimed that Israel was using poisonous gas on Palestinians "which has led to an increase in cancer cases among women and children", and that Israel had contaminated 80% of Palestinian water sources with "chemical materials". Suha Arafat's claims were widely denounced as false and antisemitic, and Clinton was criticised for appearing not to swiftly reject the claims, though she criticised the claims the following day. A Palestinian official apologised "for any embarrassment the first lady had suffered."

== After Arafat's death ==
Suha and Zahwa lived in Tunisia from 2004 to 2007 and obtained Tunisian citizenship in September 2006. On 7 August 2007, Tunisia, without warning Suha, revoked her citizenship but not her daughter's. Suha claimed her Tunisian property was also frozen.

On 31 October 2011, the Tunis Court of First Instance issued an international arrest warrant for Suha, relating to corruption in a business deal that involved the former Tunisian first lady, Leila Ben Ali, in 2006. Initially, Suha proclaimed her complete cooperation with the Tunisian prosecutors but shortly thereafter she denounced the prosecution as a Tunisian scheme to defame her and the Palestinian cause. She was, at the time, living in Malta. She also denied reports that she had any money or property belonging to the Palestinian national cause, and she said that she opposed normalization of relations with Israel.

=== Other activities ===
On 27 November 2012, at the behest of Suha, Arafat's body was exhumed in the West Bank, in order to have samples taken from his remains. The purpose of the exhumation, according to Suha, was to determine whether he was poisoned with polonium.

As of 2011, she was living with her daughter in Malta.

After Arafat's death, Suha and Zahwa argued in French courts that Arafat had been murdered, possibly by poisoning. They lost their lawsuits and appeals, and in 2017 they took their case to the European Court of Human Rights, claiming that the French authorities did not give their case a fair trial by refusing to include additional expert evidence. In 2021, the Court rejected their appeal as inadmissible.

== See also ==
- Politics of Palestine
