= Amina Abbas =

First Lady of Palestine (born 1942)

- أمينة عباس

First Lady of the State of Palestine
- Current
- Assumed role 8 May 2005
- President: Mahmoud Abbas
- Preceded by: Suha Arafat

First Lady of the Palestinian National Authority
- Current
- Assumed role 15 January 2005
- President: Mahmoud Abbas
- Preceded by: Suha Arafat

Personal details
- Born: Amina Khaled Mustafa Al-Fanous; 1942 (age 83–84)
- Party: Fatah
- Spouse: Mahmoud Abbas (m. 1958)
- Children: 3, including Yasser

Amina Khaled Mustafa Abbas (Arabic: أمينة عباس; née Al-Fanous; born 1942) is a Palestinian public figure who, as the wife of President Mahmoud Abbas, is the current first lady of Palestine.

== Public life ==
Abbas is the First Lady of Palestine. She has served as Palestine's first lady since her husband was elected president in 2005.

She represented the State of Palestine at the second conference of the Arab Women Organization, a Jordanian women's rights organization, held in the United Arab Emirates in 2008. On 28 February 2012, Abbas co-sponsored a charitable donation campaign, along with Turkish First Lady Emine Erdoğan, for victims of an earthquake in Van, Turkey.

== Personal life ==
She married Mahmoud Abbas in 1958. They have three sons. Her eldest son, Mazen Abbas, who ran a building company in Doha, died in Qatar of a heart attack in 2002. Her second son, Yasser Abbas, is a businessman. Her youngest son, Tareq, is a business executive. She has eight grandchildren, six of whom are part of the Seeds of Peace initiative.

In June 2014, Abbas underwent a surgical procedure at Assuta Medical Center, a private clinic in Ramat HaHayal in Tel Aviv. She was released two days after an operation on her leg.
