= Raymonda Tawil =

Palestinian writer and journalist

Raymonda Hawa Tawil (Arabic: ريموندا حوا الطويل, born Raymonda Hawa in 1940) is a Palestinian writer and journalist. She is the mother of Suha Arafat.

== Life ==
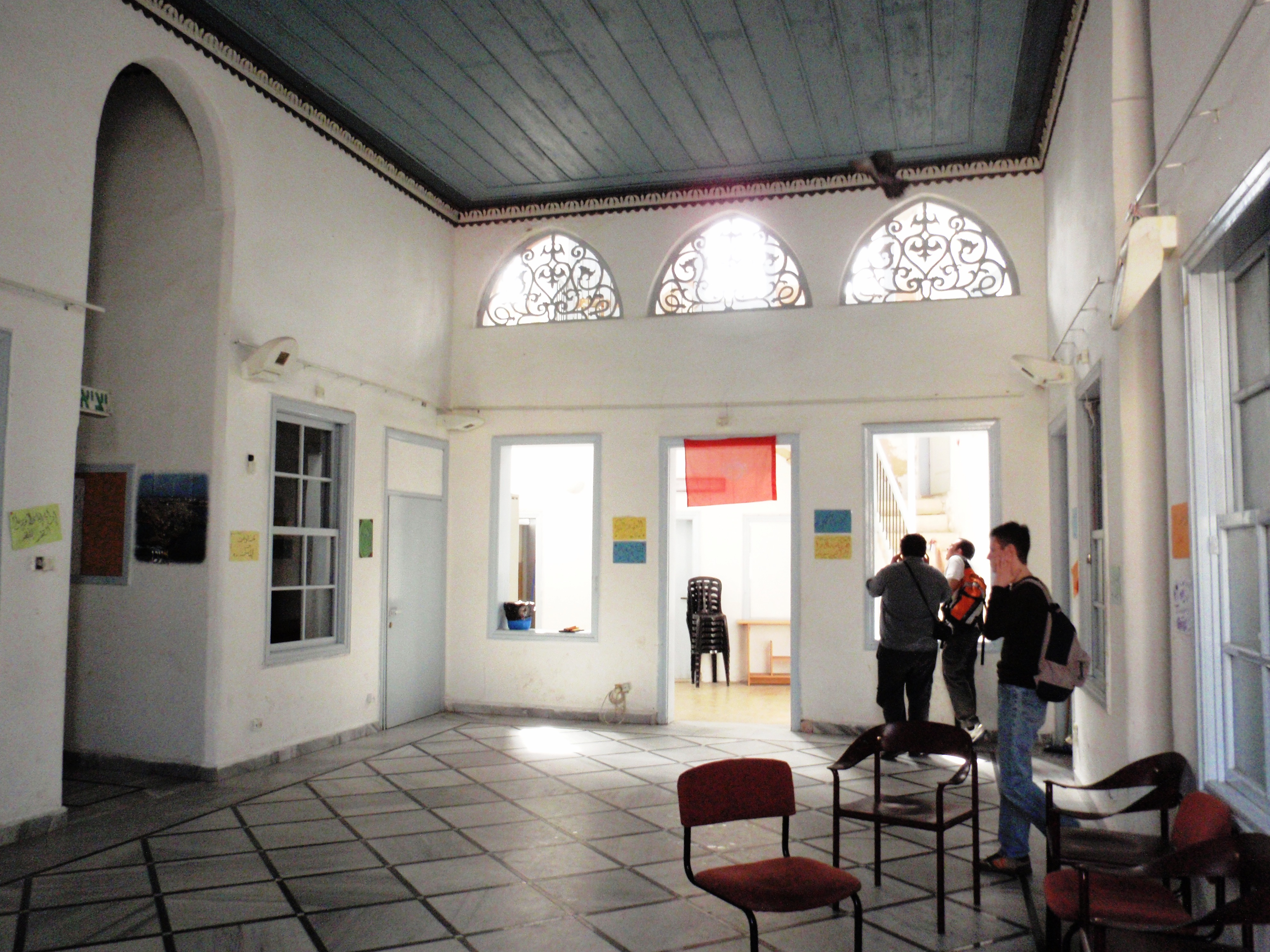
Raymonda Hawa Tawil's childhood home in Acre and has been repurposed for a youth center

Raymonda Tawil is a poet, writer and Palestinian journalist born in Acre in a prominent family of Palestinian Christians. She spent part of childhood as a boarder with French Catholic sisters. Her public life began with an intellectual show that was held in Nablus, northern West Bank. Independent-spirited columns earned her the nickname "The Lioness of Nablus". In 1978, Raymonda Hawa Tawil opened a Palestinian news agency in Jerusalem. Because of her political activities as a journalist, she was placed under house arrest for six months by Israeli military decision. She was also imprisoned for forty-five days for subversive activities during clashes with Jewish settlers and vigilantes. These experiences pushed to write about Palestine in collaboration with the Israeli journalist Peretz Kidron. She is a Christian who visited churches of multiple denominations, she has always advocated dialogue and reconciliation between the two peoples, a position that sometimes earned her hostility.

== Politics ==
Having narrowly escaped a targeted attack whose perpetrators were never found, she fled to France while Yasser Arafat, head of the PLO in Tunis, married Suha, Raymonda Tawil's daughter. In 1994, she returned to Gaza and attended the establishment of the Palestinian Authority (PA), while remaining very close to her French and Israeli friends. In 2000, at the outbreak of the Second Intifada, she lived in Ramallah, not far from the Muqata, the headquarters of the PA. She had an office next to that of Arafat, whom she saw often. The Israeli government decided to confine Arafat's freedom of movement. IDF tanks surrounding the Muqata and partially destroyed the area with bulldozers. A month later the situation worsened and towns run by the PA were reoccupied. Living alongside the President, Raymonda Tawil become Arafat's confidant and a close acquaintance.

From 2004 to 2007 she lived with her daughter Suha Arafat in Tunisia. The family was evicted from Tunisian territory by then-president Ben Ali in August 2007 and subsequently took refuge in Malta. She wrote about her life experiences in memoir-like accounts. One of her quotes was the line: "This is a strange one country where we live. Power outages are in his image. Palestine is in the night, deprived of light as freedom. From time to time the light returns. So hope returns too. And then everything stops again, everything is off. In the dark, looking for some hope and comfort. Candles are lit to try to convince yourself that all is not lost. Is this going to last? This will be the end?"

== Published books ==
Listed with original French edition first, and the English edition second.

- 1979: Mon pays, ma prison, une femme de Palestine. Paris, Éditions du Seuil, "Traversée du siècle" series.
  - 1979 Copyright Raymonda Hawa Tawil, Peretz Kidron, and Adam Publishers: My Home, My Prison
  - 1980 Published by Holt, Rinehart and Winston: My Home, My Prison
- 2001: Palestine, mon histoire. Paris, Ed. du Seuil, "L'Histoire immédiate" series.
- 2015: Anthony, David, An Improbable Friendship: The Remarkable Lives of Israeli Ruth Dayan and Palestinian Raymonda Tawil and Their Forty-Year Peace Mission, by Anthony David (Arcade Publishing, New York NY)

== See also ==
- Marwan Barghouti
