= Palestinian Center for Policy and Survey Research =

Think tank based in Ramallah

The Palestinian Center for Policy and Survey Research (PCPSR; Arabic: المركز الفلسطيني للبحوث السياسية والمسحية, romanized: Al-Markaz al-Filasṭīnī lil-Buḥūth al-Siyāsīyah wa-al-Masḥīyah) is a non-profit Palestinian research organization and think tank based in Ramallah established for "advancing scholarship and knowledge on immediate issues of concern to Palestinians in three areas: domestic politics and government, strategic analysis and foreign policy, and public opinion polls and survey research".

It has been conducting opinion polls in these fields since the mid-1990s. In 1993, Palestinian political scientist Khalil Shikaki founded the Center for Palestine Research and Studies in Nablus, which became the Palestinian Center for Policy and Survey Research in 2000. Shikaki has consulted regularly with Israeli political scientists and has conducted joint polls with Israeli researchers, including Tel Aviv University. The organization is funded mostly by the European Union and the Ford Foundation.

The organization has been the object of hostility ranging from pressure from the Palestinian Authority (PA) to mob violence. In 2003, PCPSR's offices in Ramallah were ransacked by dozens of rioters after the center published poll findings showing that only 10% of Palestinian refugees would choose to live in Israel if offered the right of return. Rioters marched from the PCPSR's office to Yasser Arafat's compound a few blocks away. According to Shikaki, the demonstrators wanted to send a message to PA President Mahmoud Abbas that the right of return was non-negotiable. In 2015, the PA required that all Palestinian NGOs, including PCPSR, report their activities and funding to the cabinet.

The PCPSR has continued to conduct polling in Gaza during the 2023-25 Gaza war. Shikaki (who was born in Rafah) told a reporter in July 2024 that their data collectors are instructed not to enter areas of combat, and so far none have been killed or injured in the war.

On 29 August 2024 the Israel Defense Forces released Hamas documents that it said showed that, unbeknownst to the PCPSR, Hamas had secretly falsified its levels of public support in polls conducted by the PCPSR. Rejecting the IDF claims, Shikaki said it was 'highly unlikely' that Hamas had falsified its results, but vowed to probe the claims.

== See also ==
- Arab Barometer
