= Hussein al-Sheikh =

Vice President of Palestine since 2025

- حسين الشيخ
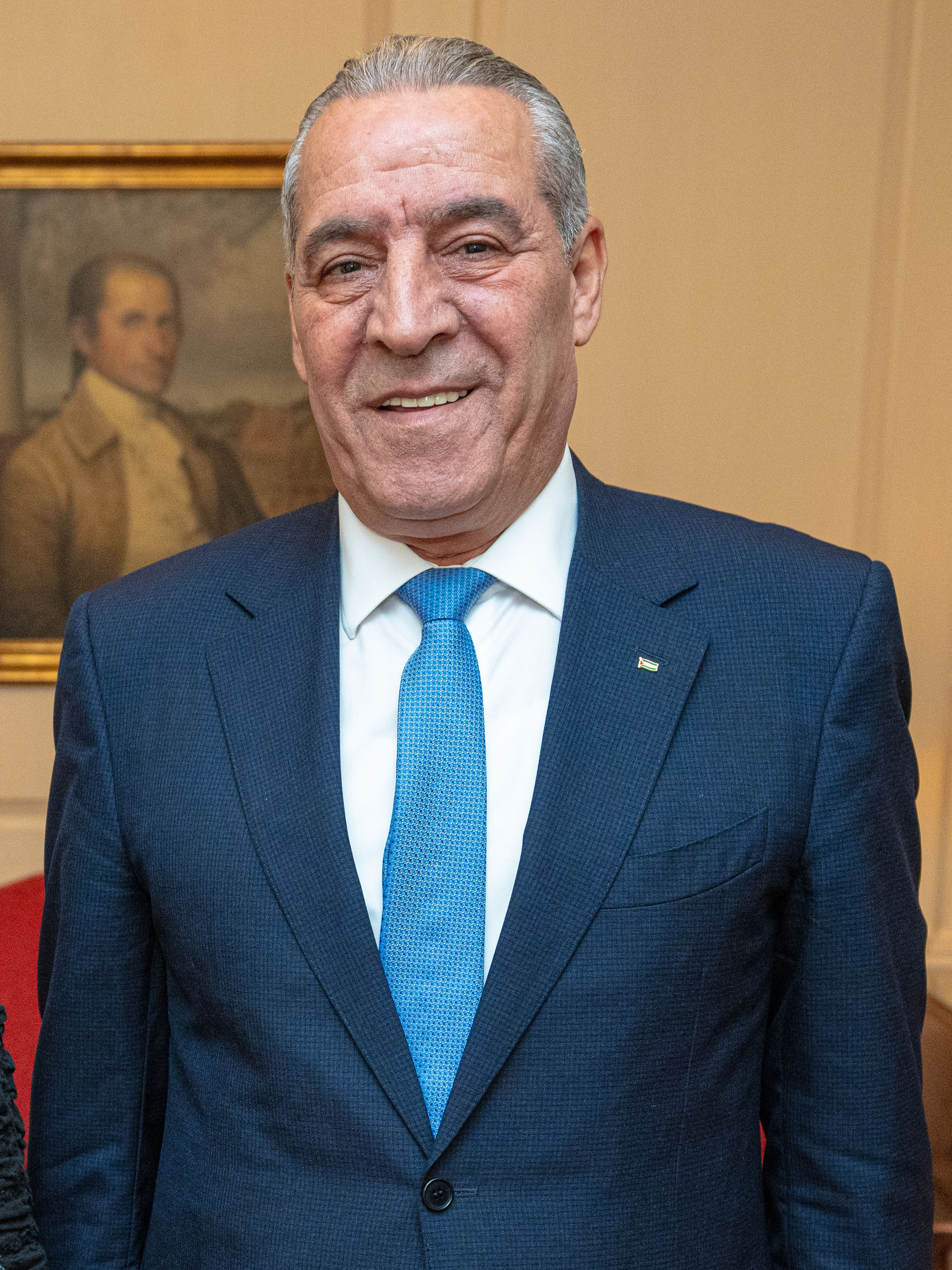
- Al-Sheikh in 2022

1st Vice President of Palestine
- Incumbent
- Assumed office 26 April 2025
- President: Mahmoud Abbas
- Preceded by: Office established

Vice Chairman of the Palestine Liberation Organization
- Incumbent
- Assumed office 26 April 2025

Vice Chairman of Central Committee of Fatah
- Incumbent
- Assumed office 3 June 2026
- President: Mahmoud Abbas
- Preceded by: Mahmoud Aloul

Secretary General of the Palestine Liberation Organization
- In office 25 May 2022 – 26 April 2025
- Preceded by: Saeb Erekat
- Succeeded by: Azzam al-Ahmad

President of the General Authority for Civil Affairs
- In office 2007 – 20 February 2025
- President: Mahmoud Abbas
- Prime Minister: Salam Fayyad; Rami Hamdallah; Mohammad Shtayyeh; Mohammad Mustafa
- Preceded by: Mohammed Dahlan (as Minister of Civil Affairs)
- Succeeded by: Ayman Qandil

Personal details
- Born: 14 December 1960 (age 65) Ramallah, Jordanian-administered West Bank, Palestine (now Ramallah, Palestine)
- Party: Fatah
- Children: 6
- Website: Official website

Hussein al-Sheikh (Arabic: حسين الشيخ; born 14 December 1960) is a Palestinian politician who has served as the first vice president of Palestine since 26 April 2025. He has also served as the secretary general of the Executive Committee of the Palestine Liberation Organization (PLO) from 25 May 2022 to 26 April 2025.

== Early life ==
Hussein al-Sheikh was born in Ramallah on 14 December 1960 during a period of the Jordanian annexation of the West Bank. His family fled from their village during the Nakba in 1948.

From 1977/8 to 1988/9, Al-Sheikh spent 11 years in Israeli prisons during his youth, during which he learned Hebrew. During the First Intifada he was a member of the Unified National Leadership of the Uprising. He was a colonel in the Palestinian Preventive Security. In 1999, he became secretary general of Fatah in the West Bank.

== Political career ==
Al-Sheikh headed the General Authority of Civil Affairs of the Palestinian National Authority from 2007 to 2025. He was first elected as a member of the Central Committee of Fatah in 2008. From 2013 to 2019, he was the minister for the coordination of civil affairs.

On 25 June 2022, the Executive Committee of the PLO reaffirmed al-Sheikh as secretary general and head of the Negotiations Affairs Department of the PLO.

On 25 April 2025, Mahmoud Abbas, the President of Palestine, appointed al-Sheikh as Vice President and deputy chairman of the Executive Committee of the PLO. Al-Sheikh's appointment was controversial, with many Palestinians seeing him as unpopular, corrupt, and too close to Israel.

== Personal life ==
Al-Sheikh is the father of six children.

Political offices
Preceded by Mohammed Dahlan as Minister of Civil Affairs	President of the General Authority for Civil Affairs; 2007–2025	Succeeded by Ayman Qandil
Preceded by Saeb Erekat	Secretary General of the Palestine Liberation Organization; 2022–2025	Succeeded by Azzam al-Ahmad
New creation	Vice Chairman of the Palestine Liberation Organization; 2025–present	Incumbent
New creation	Vice President of Palestine; 2025–present	Incumbent
