= Corruption in Palestine =

Corruption in Palestine is regarded as one of the most pressing problems confronting the territory. It is deeply entrenched, impacting both the political and social spheres of society. Numerous corruption scandals have been reported, and these include cases that involve high-ranking officials of the Palestinian Authority. Notable cases include the embezzlement of public funds, misappropriation of resources, and widespread nepotism.

== Perception ==
The Palestinian Authority is the governing entity of Palestine. Through the years, it has been plagued by corruption scandals. This continues to erode public trust and hamper economic development. Around 81 percent of the Palestinian population believe that corruption in Palestinian institutions exists. While there are reports that suggest improvements in Palestine's corruption record due to recent anti-corruption measures, the perception of corruption persists. This is attributed to the notion that the problem is structural to the Palestinian body politic.

== Wasta ==
Nepotism remains the most pervasive form of corruption in Palestine. It is based on the Middle Eastern concept of Wasta, which entails the use of personal connections or intermediaries in order to access services, jobs, and other forms of advantage. It dominates the public sector and is deeply embedded in the Palestinian sociocultural fabric. This practice is often indistinguishable from legitimate assistance. Wasta may be demonstrated in facilitating and speeding up of governmental processes such as when people apply for IDs, licenses, or birth certificates. By 2019, it was reported that almost two in every five people have used wasta to obtain public services.

From a cultural perspective, wasta has been accepted and even favorably viewed due to its role in facilitating bureaucratic processes. Some believe that it helps circumvent prejudice for marginalized segments of the population. For instance, women, who constitute an underrepresented demographic in the bureaucracy (e.g. judiciary) utilize wasta to obtain justice through personal connections. During elections, it is also expected by the electorate as politicians are pressured to provide wasta in order to secure votes. There is a pervasive belief that it is not merely a form of political transaction but a duty for elected officials.

== Scandals ==
One of the most prominent corruption cases that implicated high-ranking officials was the accusation in 2016 lodged against several ministers, including the Minister of Civilian Affairs Jamil Tarifi. The scandal involved the importation of Egyptian cement for the construction of a housing project in Palestine. One of the companies, the Tarifi Company for Concrete Mix (TCCM), was headed by Jamal Tarifi, the minister's brother.

The two Palestinian companies involved in this affair were accused of diverting it to Israel for profit, and it is believed to have been used for the construction of its Separation Wall. It was alleged that the companies falsified documents and bribed PL officials to carry out the operation. They also obtained a license to operate from the Economy Ministry, headed by Mahir al-Masri. The embarrassment entailed in the incident further aggravated the corruption case, which is supposed to help the Palestinian economy. In the deal, Egypt agreed to sell 420,000 tons of high-quality cement for a mere $12–15 per ton, a symbolic price offered in a bid to help Palestine address the adverse effects of the Israeli–Palestinian conflict.

Previous corruption scandals include the case of former Economy Minister Hassan Abbu Labdeh, who was accused of money laundering, fraud, and the manipulation of the financial market. There was also Sami al-Rimlawi, the former Director General of the Ministry of Finance, who was implicated in a case of embezzlement. He was apprehended at the King Hussein Bridge at the Jordan Valley while attempting to flee Palestine. His wife also suffered the same fate while smuggling large amounts of money through the Rafah Crossing.

=== Impact ===
Aside from the impact of the cement scandal on social welfare, there are several examples that can represent the extent of the adverse effects of corruption on Palestine. First, it has a detrimental effect on the peace process with Israel. The erosion of public trust in the Palestinian Authority has weakened its negotiating position, while its policies also garner low support from the Palestinian public. The low public support has undermined the legitimacy of the government, which has led to the radicalization of Palestinian politics. In terms of the Palestinian economy, there are two main negative effects: first, corruption prevented the formation of a healthy national economy; and, second, the absence of this kind of economy governed by the rule of law deterred international confidence and private investment.

== Anti-corruption measures ==
The majority of the initiatives designed to combat corruption in Palestine have focused on strengthening legal frameworks, institutional capacities, and the promotion of transparency and accountability. To combat the problem, several legislations were passed and agencies were established such as the Anti-Corruption Commission, Corruption Crimes Court, which is an external audit bureau, the SAACB, the Economic Crimes and Support Unit created within the Attorney General's office, among others. In 2019, Palestine enacted the Whistleblower Protection Act, the country's first whistleblower protection system that protects those who report corruption against reprisals.

International pressure has also played a significant part in facilitating anti-corruption reform in Palestine. The most notable of these involve donor countries and international organizations. For example, the European Union has provided Palestine conditional aid tied to anti-corruption measures. Particularly, this strategy has led to improved transparency and accountability in the use of the bloc's donated funds. Outcomes include increased willingness on the part of the Palestinian Authority to be subjected to increased scrutiny of its financial practices.

Palestine has also ratified the United Nations Convention Against Corruption. As part of its commitment, it has instituted anti-corruption measures, criminalized corruption offenses, and initiated international cooperation.

=== Challenges ===
Challenges to the Palestinian anti-corruption measures include cultural tolerance. There are integrity issues, for example, that are tolerated since they are considered socially acceptable. This is one of the fundamental issues that slow down anti-corruption reform. By 2021, the Palestinian Anti-Corruption Commission (PACC) was inundated with 886 corruption complaints, and the bulk of these involve cases of favoritism. The succession of previous Palestinian administrations has also failed to recognize and acknowledge corruption in Palestine. This has been attributed to a widely held belief that corruption charges had been exaggerated for ulterior motives. Political leaders such as Mohammad Shtayyeh have maintained, for instance, that Israel has a hand in manipulating corruption perception. In a statement, he maintained: “Israeli media inserted stories of corruption into the media daily, and before every single donor meeting Israeli media leaked stories. People started to believe [this], because they cannot see the [donor] money [which is paid as salaries].” This view, which has been dubbed as “exaggeration theory”, has affected the Palestine leadership's willingness to address corruption as a public concern.
