= Vice President of Palestine =

Second-highest constitutional office in Palestine

Vice President of the State of Palestine
- نائب رئيس دولة فلسطين
- Coat of arms of Palestine

- Flag of Palestine

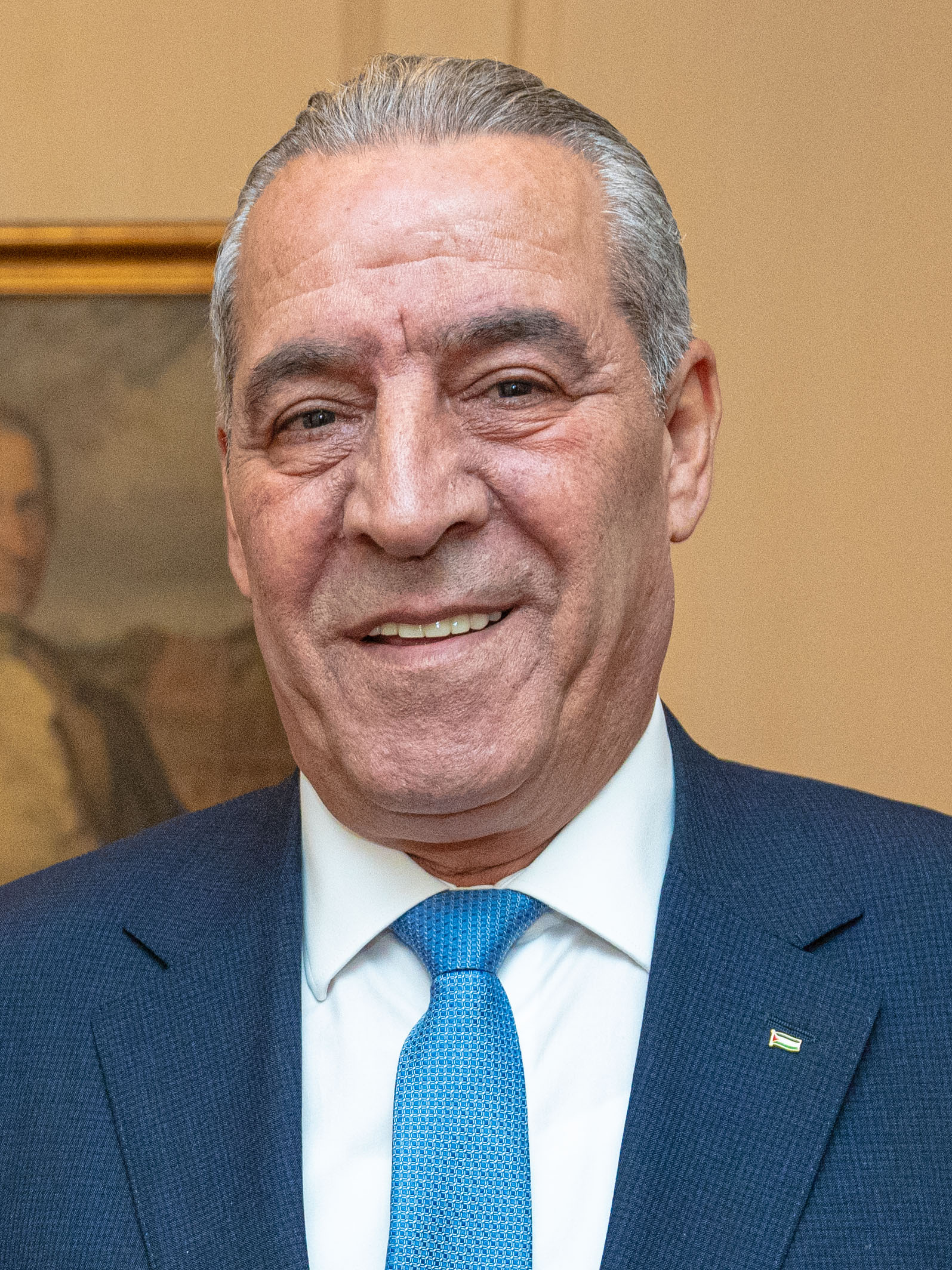
- Incumbent; Hussein al-Sheikh since 26 April 2025
- Status: Second highest branch officer
- Nominator: Executive Committee of the Palestine Liberation Organization
- Appointer: President
- Term length: Four years, at the pleasure of the President
- Precursor: Speaker of the Palestinian Legislative Council
- Inaugural holder: Hussein al-Sheikh
- Formation: 24 April 2025; 16 months ago

The vice president of the State of Palestine (Arabic: نائب رئيس دولة فلسطين, romanized: Nayib Raʼīs Dawlat Filasṭīn) is the second-highest-ranking office in the executive branch of the Palestinian government, after the president, and ranks first in the presidential line of succession. Like other countries with a vice president, if the president dies, resigned or is unable to complete his term, then the vice president becomes president.

The president has the authority to appoint the vice president from among the members of the Executive Committee, based on a nomination by the Committee's chairman and with the approval of its members. The president may assign duties to the vice president, relieve them of their position, or accept their resignation.

The position was established on 24 April 2025, during a session of the Palestinian Central Council. The decision was approved by 170 members present, with one opposing vote and one abstention. The selection took place on 26 April during a meeting of the Executive Committee, where the current secretary Hussein al-Sheikh expected to be assigned the position.

== List of vice presidents (2025–present) ==
No.	Portrait	Name (Birth–Death)	Term			Political party	President	Ref.
No.	Portrait	Name (Birth–Death)	Took office	Left office	Duration	Political party	President	Ref.
1		Hussein al-Sheikh (born 1960)	26 April 2025	Incumbent	1 year, 135 days	Fatah	Mahmoud Abbas	

== See also ==
- List of current vice presidents and designated acting president
