= PLO Negotiations Affairs Department =

Government Organization

The PLO Negotiations Affairs Department (NAD) was established in 1994 in Gaza in order to follow up on the implementation of the Interim Agreement signed between Israel and the Palestine Liberation Organization (PLO). Until mid 2003 the NAD was headed by President Mahmoud Abbas (Abu Mazen), then secretary-general of the PLO Executive Committee. After President Abbas was selected by the Palestinian Legislative Council in April 2003 to become the first Palestinian prime minister, Dr. Saeb Erekat, former Minister for Local Government and Chief Palestinian Negotiator was nominated as Head of the NAD by the PLO.

The NAD has two offices – one in Gaza and a second in Ramallah. The NAD office in Gaza is composed of units responsible for Israeli affairs, Israel’s violations of signed agreements, Israel’s colonization (illegal settlement policies), and Palestinian refugees. The Ramallah office is responsible for following up on the Interim Agreements and preparing Palestinian positions for the Permanent Status talks with Israel. The office is therefore structured into six units: Israeli Affairs, Research and Information, Interim Agreement, Permanent Status, Public Relations, and Administrative and Finance.

== The Negotiations Support Project ==
In late 1998 the NAD approached the Government of the United Kingdom seeking technical assistance to its preparations for Permanent Status talks. The U.K. Department for International Development consequently agreed to support the establishment of the Negotiations Support Project in Ramallah. The purpose of the Negotiations Support Project is to provide highly professional legal, policy and communications advice to the NAD and Palestinian negotiators in preparation for, and during, Permanent Status negotiations with Israel. Following the collapse of formal negotiations at the outset of 2001, an additional purpose of the project is to encourage the resumption of Permanent Status negotiations by contributing to a variety of diplomatic initiatives aimed at bringing the two sides back together.

Following the establishment of the Negotiations Support Project, the governments of Denmark, the Netherlands, Norway and Sweden also agreed to support the project. Since that time, these five governments have continuously provided funding to the project and have committed to doing so until today.

The Negotiations Support Project has two main departments: the Legal & Policy Department and the Communications Department.

The Legal & Policy Department has three objectives. The first is to strengthen and refine existing Palestinian negotiation positions. The second is to develop new positions where no policy previously existed. The third is to contribute to interim initiatives intended either to lead Palestine and Israel out of the current political crisis and towards resumption of permanent status negotiations or to minimize the damage inflicted by continuing Israeli actions on the likelihood of a fair and sustainable outcome to permanent status negotiations. The Department provides advice on the permanent status issues (security, settlements, Jerusalem, refugees, borders and water), as well as other issues (economic relations, compensation, agriculture, tourism, health, transport, energy, telecommunications and archaeology).

The Communications Department aims to explain and increase support for the Palestinian positions on permanent status issues and interim initiatives, to mobilize local and international civil society organizations to undertake advocacy on behalf of those positions, and to overcome misperceptions held by the Israeli public concerning Palestinian goals and intentions towards Israel. In essence the Department publicizes and explains Palestinian negotiation positions in order to confront and balance out alternative misleading narratives, thereby creating an atmosphere that will both allow negotiations to occur and increase the likelihood of a fair and sustainable outcome. The Department achieves its goals through a range of communications activities such as providing briefings to international journalists, parliamentarians and representatives of civil society; facilitating their access to the PLO leadership; providing communications advice to that leadership; publishing fact sheets, maps, and newsletters on key topics; maintaining the website of the NAD; lobbying editorial boards of international media organizations to ensure accurate reporting; building an email distribution list for NAD materials, and undertaking outreach activities in the United States, Europe and Israel.

== Activities ==
In November 2008, PLO's Negotiations Department published ads promoting the Arab Peace Initiative in Israeli dailies. According to Yossi Alpher it was the first time a leading Arab institution published a "peace ad" in the Israeli press. In response, the Israeli activist group Peace Now published ads in Palestinian press.

== See also ==
- Israeli–Palestinian peace process
