= Yasser Abbas =

Palestinian-Canadian businessman (born 1962)

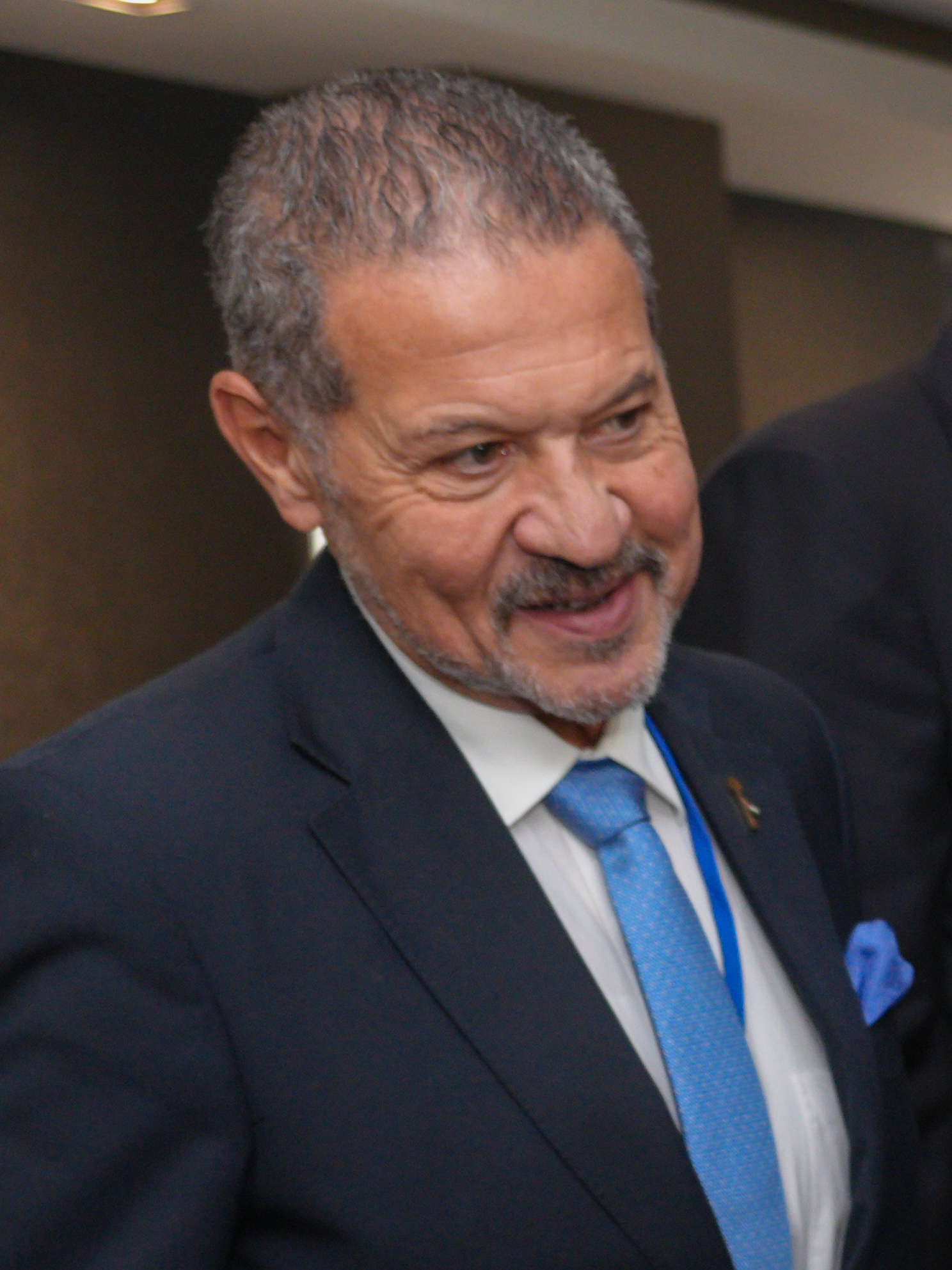
- Abbas in 2024
- Born: Yasser Mahmoud Reda Abbas; 8 February 1962 (age 64)
- Education: Washington State University
- Occupation: Businessman
- Spouse: Malak Jaafar (m. 2015)
- Children: 3
- Parents: Mahmoud Abbas (father); Amina Abbas (mother)

Yasser Mahmoud Reda Abbas (Arabic: ياسر عباس; born 8 February 1962) is a Palestinian-Canadian multi-millionaire businessman and the son of Palestinian Authority President Mahmoud Abbas. His conspicuous wealth has caused controversy in the Palestinian Territories.

== Early life ==
Yasser Mahmoud Reda Abbas is the second of three sons of Mahmoud Abbas and his wife Amina. He was named in honor of Palestinian leader Yasser Arafat. In 1983, he graduated with a bachelor's degree in civil engineering from Washington State University.

== Career ==
Abbas claims that his wealth comes from his own businesses. However Mohammed Rachid, a former economic advisor to Yasser Arafat, has accused Abbas' father of taking $100 million from the Palestinian government for himself.

In the late 1980s to early 1990s, Abbas lived in Montreal, Canada, where he had a company which was mainly involved in renovating apartment buildings, and was able to obtain Canadian citizenship.

Abbas worked for a number of contracting firms from the Persian Gulf from the 1980s until he left to Ramallah to start his own company in 1997. Abbas is the owner of Falcon Tobacco, the company that controls all American-made cigarette sales in all Palestinian territories. Abbas also is the chairman of the Falcon Holding Group, a Palestinian investment firm that owns Falcon Electric Mechanical Contracting Company (FEMC). However, FEMC's success didn't come without the assistance from the U.S. government: The company had been rewarded a contract for $1.89 million from the U.S. government during the Iraq war to build a sewage system in the town of Hebron.

As well as his tobacco business, Abbas is the head of an insurance company, a civil engineering firm and a real-estate business, all of which are headquartered in Ramallah, effectively the capital of the West Bank.

Together with his brother, Tariq Abbas, he also owns an advertising agency in the West Bank.

In October 2013, a judge dismissed a libel case brought by Abbas against Jonathan Schanzer, a political analyst and vice president of the Washington DC–based Foundation for Defense of Democracies. In June 2012, Schanzer had written an online opinion piece for Foreign Policy magazine, which questioned the legitimacy of the wealth of President Mahmoud Abbas's two sons (Yasser and Tariq).

In August 2015, he was reported to be "tied to a corruption scandal" involving the misuse of public funds, and had paid $50,000 to acquire apartments in a luxury complex in Ramallah, for which Bahrain's foreign minister had been asked for $4 million to fund the private complex for Palestinian officials.

== Personal life ==
Abbas has two sons and a daughter from a previous marriage. In 2015, he married a Lebanese BBC Arabic Television presenter, Malak Jaafar.
