= Mahmoud Abbas =

President of Palestine since 2005

His Excellency Mahmoud Abbas
- مَحْمُود عَبَّاس
- Abbas in 2026

2nd President of Palestine
- Incumbent
- Assumed office 15 January 2005
- Prime Minister: Salam Fayyad; Rami Hamdallah; Mohammad Shtayyeh; Mohammad Mustafa
- Vice President: Hussein al-Sheikh
- Preceded by: Yasser Arafat; Rawhi Fattouh (interim)

2nd President of the Palestinian National Authority
- Incumbent
- Assumed office 15 January 2005 (Note: Abbas's term as president expired 15 January 2009, after which Aziz Duwaik had been recognised as president by the Haniyeh government in the Gaza Strip, while Abbas is recognised as president by the Fayyad government in the West Bank and all the states that recognise the independence of Palestine, as well as the UN. In April 2014, he was recognized by Haniyeh in the context of the Unity Government.)
- Prime Minister: Ahmed Qurei; Nabil Shaath (acting); Ahmed Qurei; Ismail Haniyeh; Salam Fayyad (Note: The position of Prime Minister of the Palestinian National Authority was abolished in 2013 and replaced by the prime minister of the State of Palestine. Fayyad is the last to hold the precursor position under Abbas.)
- Preceded by: Yasser Arafat; Rawhi Fattouh (interim)

4th Chairman of the Palestine Liberation Organization
- Incumbent
- Assumed office 29 October 2004 (Note: Acting: 29 October – 11 November 2004)
- Deputy: Hussein al-Sheikh
- Preceded by: Yasser Arafat

1st Prime Minister of the Palestinian National Authority
- In office 19 March 2003 – 6 September 2003
- President: Yasser Arafat
- Preceded by: Ahmed Hilmi Pasha (as Prime Minister of Palestine, 1959)
- Succeeded by: Ahmed Qurei

Personal details
- Born: Mahmoud Rida Abbas; 15 November 1935 (age 91) Safed, Mandatory Palestine
- Party: Fatah
- Spouse: Amina Al-Fanous (m. 1958)
- Children: 3, including Yasser
- Education: Damascus University; Patrice Lumumba Peoples' Friendship University

Mahmoud Rida Abbas (Arabic: مَحْمُود عَبَّاس, romanized: Maḥmūd ʿAbbās; born 15 November 1935), also known by the kunya Abu Mazen (Arabic: أَبُو مَازِن, ʾAbū Māzin), is a Palestinian politician who has been serving as the second president of Palestine and the Palestinian National Authority (PNA) since 2005. He has also been the fourth chairman of the Palestine Liberation Organization (PLO) since 2004. Abbas is also a member of the Fatah party and was elected the party's chairman in 2009.

Abbas was elected on 9 January 2005 to serve as President of the Palestinian National Authority until 15 January 2009, but extended his term until the next election (initially scheduled for 2010), citing the PLO constitution, and on 16 December 2009 was voted into office indefinitely by the PLO Central Council. As a result, Fatah's main rival, Hamas, initially announced that it would not recognize the extension or view Abbas as the rightful president. Nonetheless, Abbas is internationally recognized in his positions and Hamas and Fatah conducted numerous negotiations in the following years, leading to an agreement in April 2014 for a Unity Government (which lasted until October 2016) and to the recognition of his office by Hamas. Abbas was chosen to continue serving as president by the PLO Central Council on 23 November 2008.

Abbas served as the first prime minister of the Palestinian Authority from March to September 2003. Before being named prime minister, Abbas led the PLO Negotiations Affairs Department. Abbas has been subject to both criticism and controversy, having been accused of corruption, as well as distorting Jewish history and engaging in Holocaust trivialization. Abbas was a key player in negotiations for peace and in talks laying the groundwork for the Israel–Palestine two-state solution.

== Early life and education ==
Mahmoud Rida Abbas was born on 15 November 1935 in Safed, in the Galilee region of Mandatory Palestine (now Israel). His family fled to Syria during the 1948 Palestine war. Before going to Egypt, Abbas graduated from the University of Damascus, where he studied law.

Abbas later entered graduate studies at the Patrice Lumumba University in Moscow, where he earned a Candidate of Sciences degree (the Soviet equivalent of a PhD). His doctoral dissertation was The Other Side: The Secret Relationship Between Nazism and Zionism.

== Political activism and career ==
In the mid-1950s, Abbas became heavily involved in underground Palestinian politics, joining a number of exiled Palestinians in Qatar, where he was Director of Personnel in the emirate's Civil Service. While there in 1961, he was recruited to become a member of Fatah, founded by Yasser Arafat and five other Palestinians in Kuwait in the late 1950s. At the time, Arafat was establishing the groundwork of Fatah by enlisting wealthy Palestinians in Qatar, Kuwait, and other Gulf States.

According to Abu Daoud, part of the funds raised by Abbas were used, without the latter's knowledge, to implement the 1972 Munich massacre. He was among the first members of Fatah to call for talks with moderate Israelis, doing so in 1977. In a 2012 interview, he recalled, "[...] because we took up arms, we were in a position to put them down with credibility."

He called for the repatriation of Arab Jews to their countries of origin in 1977, receiving the approval of Morocco, Tunisia, Libya, Egypt, Iraq, Yemen, and Sudan.

He has performed diplomatic duties, presenting a moderating contrast to the PLO's "revolutionary" policies. Abbas was the first PLO official to visit Saudi Arabia after the Gulf War in January 1993 to mend fences with the Gulf countries after the PLO's support of Iraq during the Persian Gulf War strained relations. In the Oslo I Accord, Abbas was the signatory for the PLO on 13 September 1993. He published a memoir, Through Secret Channels: The Road to Oslo (1995).

He and Israeli negotiator Yossi Beilin wrote the Beilin–Abu Mazen agreement in 1995, which was meant to be the framework for a future Israeli–Palestinian peace deal.

It emerged in September 2016 that Abbas may have once worked for the KGB, as early as 1985 in Damascus, according to a document uncovered in the Mitrokhin Archive, where he is registered as agent "Krotov". Palestinian officials replied that at the time in question, the PLO collaborated with Moscow, and that Abbas was their liaison man in the Palestinian-Soviet friendship foundation.

=== Prime minister ===
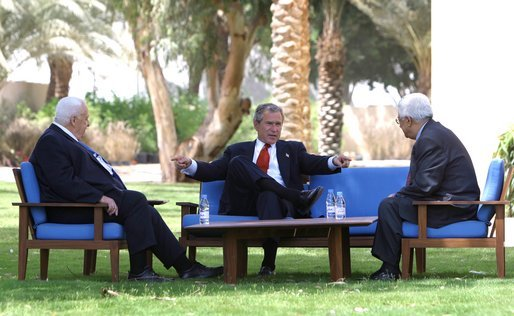
Abbas with Ariel Sharon and George W. Bush in Aqaba, Jordan, 4 June 2003.

By early 2003, as Israel and the United States refused to negotiate with Yasser Arafat, it was thought that Abbas would be a candidate for the kind of leadership role envisaged by both countries. As one of the few remaining founding members of Fatah, he had some degree of credibility within the Palestinian cause, and his candidacy was bolstered by the fact that other high-profile Palestinians were for various reasons not suitable (the most notable, Marwan Barghouti, was a prisoner in Israeli jail after having been convicted on charges of being responsible for multiple murders by an Israeli court). Abbas's reputation as a pragmatist garnered him favor with the West and some members of the Palestinian legislature. Under international pressure, on 19 March 2003, Arafat appointed Abbas Prime Minister of the Palestinian National Authority. According to Gilbert Achcar, the United States imposed Abbas on Arafat, the democratically elected leader, though the majority of Palestinians thought of Abbas as a Quisling.

A struggle for power between Arafat and Abbas ensued. Abbas's term as prime minister was characterised by numerous conflicts between him and Arafat over the distribution of power. The United States and Israel accused Arafat of undermining Abbas and his government. Abbas hinted he would resign if not given more control over the administration. In early September 2003, he confronted the Palestinian parliament over this issue.

Abbas came into conflict with Palestinian militant groups, notably the Palestinian Islamic Jihad Movement and Hamas because his pragmatic policies were opposed to their hard-line approach. Initially, he pledged not to use force against the militants in the interest of avoiding a civil war, and attempted negotiation. This was partially successful, resulting in a pledge from the two groups to honor a unilateral Palestinian cease-fire. However, continuing violence and Israeli "targeted killings" of known leaders forced Abbas to pledge a crackdown in order to uphold the Palestinian Authority's side of the Road map for peace. This led to a power struggle with Arafat over control of the Palestinian Security Services; Arafat refused to release control to Abbas, thus preventing him from using them on the militants. Abbas resigned as prime minister on 6 September 2003, citing lack of support from Israel and the United States as well as "internal incitement" against his government.

=== 2005 presidential election ===
After Yasser Arafat's death, Abbas was seen, at least by Fatah, as his natural successor. On 25 November 2004, Abbas was endorsed by Fatah's Revolutionary Council as its preferred candidate for the presidential election, scheduled for 9 January 2005. On 14 December, Abbas called for an end to violence in the Second Intifada and a return to peaceful resistance. Abbas told the Asharq Al-Awsat newspaper that "the use of arms has been damaging and should end." However, he refused, or was not able, to disarm Palestinian militants and use force against groups designated as terrorist organisations.

With Israeli forces arresting and restricting the movement of other candidates, Hamas's boycott of the election, and his campaign being given 94% of the Palestinian electoral campaign coverage on TV, Abbas's election was virtually ensured, and on 9 January Abbas was elected with 63% of the vote as President of the Palestinian National Authority.

In his speech, he addressed a crowd of supporters chanting "a million shahids", stating: "I present this victory to the soul of Yasser Arafat and present it to our people, to our martyrs and to 11,000 prisoners". He also called for Palestinian groups to end the use of arms against Israelis.

=== Presidency and PLO leadership ===
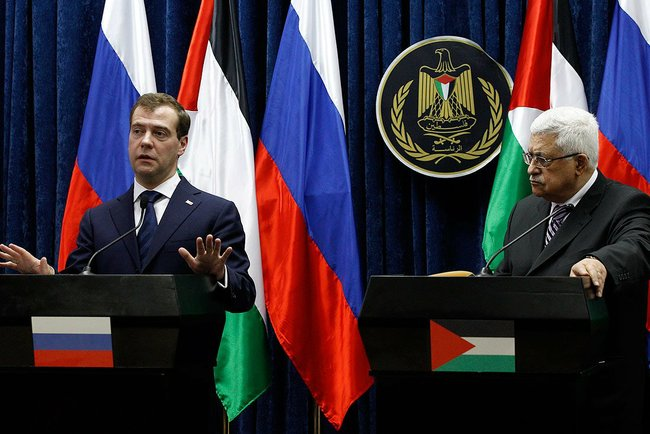
Abbas with Russian president Dmitry Medvedev, January 2011

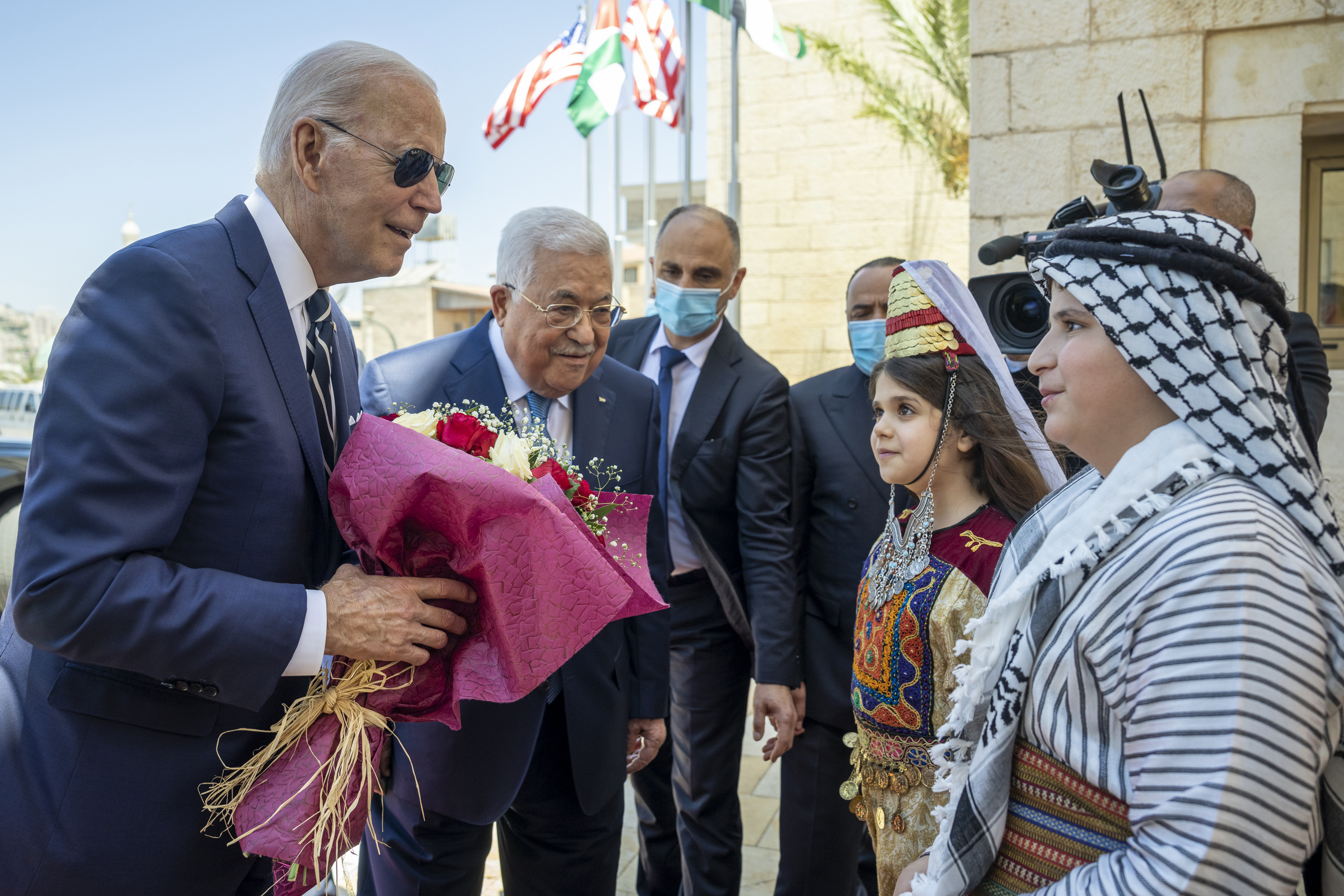
Abbas with U.S. president Joe Biden at the Palestinian Presidential Palace in Bethlehem, July 2022

Despite Abbas's call for a peaceful solution, attacks by militant groups continued after his election, in a direct challenge to his authority. The Palestinian Islamic Jihad Movement in Palestine launched a raid in Gaza on 12 January 2005, that killed one and wounded three Israeli military personnel. On 13 January, Palestinians from the Al-Aqsa Martyrs' Brigades, Hamas, and the Popular Resistance Committees launched a suicide attack on the Karni crossing, killing six Israelis. As a result, Israel shut down the damaged terminal and broke off relations with Abbas and the Palestinian Authority, stating that Abbas must now show a gesture of peace by attempting to stop such attacks. Abbas was formally sworn in as the President of the Palestinian National Authority in a ceremony held on 15 January, in the West Bank town of Ramallah.

In February 2005, Abbas met with Israeli prime minister Ariel Sharon at the Sharm el-Sheikh Summit to end the Second Intifada, and they both reaffirmed their commitment to the Roadmap for peace process. Sharon also agreed to release 900 Palestinian prisoners of the 7,500 being held at the time, and to withdraw from West Bank towns.

On 9 August 2005, Abbas announced that legislative elections, originally scheduled for 17 July 2005, would take place in January 2006. On 20 August, he set the elections for 25 January. On 15 January 2006, Abbas declared that, despite unrest in Gaza, he would not change the election date, unless Israel were to prevent Palestinians in East Jerusalem from voting. The elections took place on 25 January 2006, and resulted in a decisive Hamas victory.

In January 2006, in the context of Fatah's election loss and Hamas' presumed future one party government, Abbas said that he would not run for office again at the end of his term. However, following international sanctions against a Hamas one party government, political and military conflicts between Hamas and Fatah, and the division of the country, which made new elections impossible, Abbas stayed president after the expiration of his four-year term on 15 January 2009. He extended his term for another year, using another interpretation of the Basic Law and the Election Law, so he could align the next presidential and parliamentary elections. Pointing to the Palestinian constitution, Hamas disputed the validity of this move, and considered Abbas's term to have ended, in which case Aziz Duwaik, Speaker of the Palestinian Legislative Council, would have become acting president.

In December 2009, the leadership of the Palestinian Central Council announced an indefinite extension of Abbas's term as president. Since then, Abbas has remained president of the Fatah-controlled areas of the Palestinian territories. In April 2014, Hamas withdrew its objection, in order to form a Unity Government with Fatah.

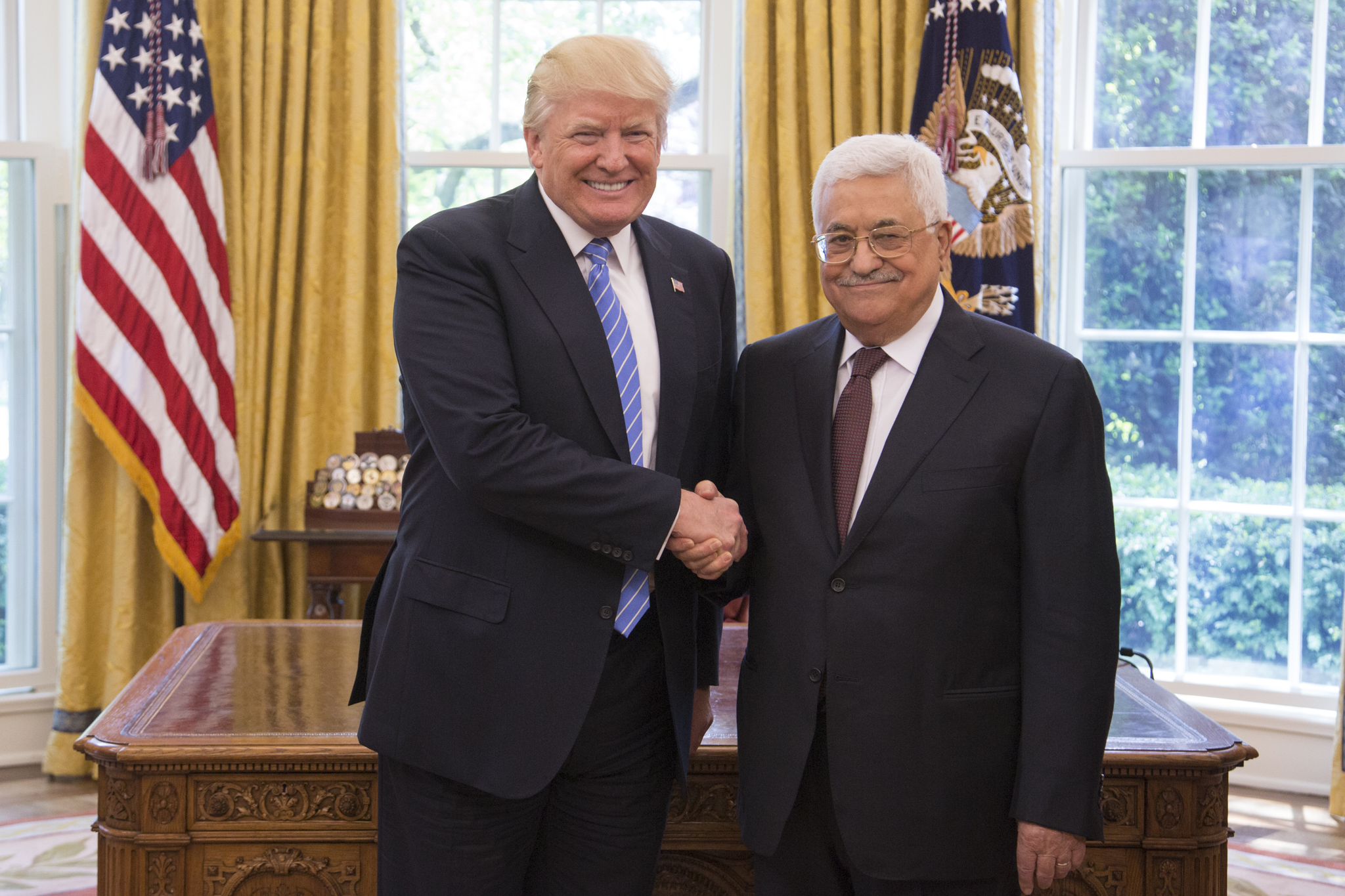
Abbas with U.S. president Donald Trump in Washington, D.C., 3 May 2017

Abbas has supported the blockade of the Gaza Strip as a means of weakening Hamas. In 2010, Abbas declared that he opposed lifting the Israeli naval blockade of the Gaza Strip because this would bolster Hamas. Egypt also supported this position. In 2014 and subsequent years, Abbas supported Egypt's crackdown on smuggling tunnels and welcomed the flooding of the tunnels by Egypt in coordination with the PA. In 2016, Abbas objected to the entrance of Qatari fuel to the Gaza electricity plant via Israel, because his PA would be unable to collect taxes on the fuel.

In December 2014, Abbas signed an application for Palestine to join the International Criminal Court, just one day after the UN Security Council voted against a resolution demanding the end of Israeli occupation of Palestinian territories and statehood for Palestine by 2017. The threat of joining the ICC and suing Israel for war crimes had been considered by Palestinian officials for years prior, but the move was seen as a diplomatic "last resort." The decision came as Abbas's administration dealt with allegations of corruption and mismanagement, potential political challenges from rival parties and other Fatah members, and low approval ratings.

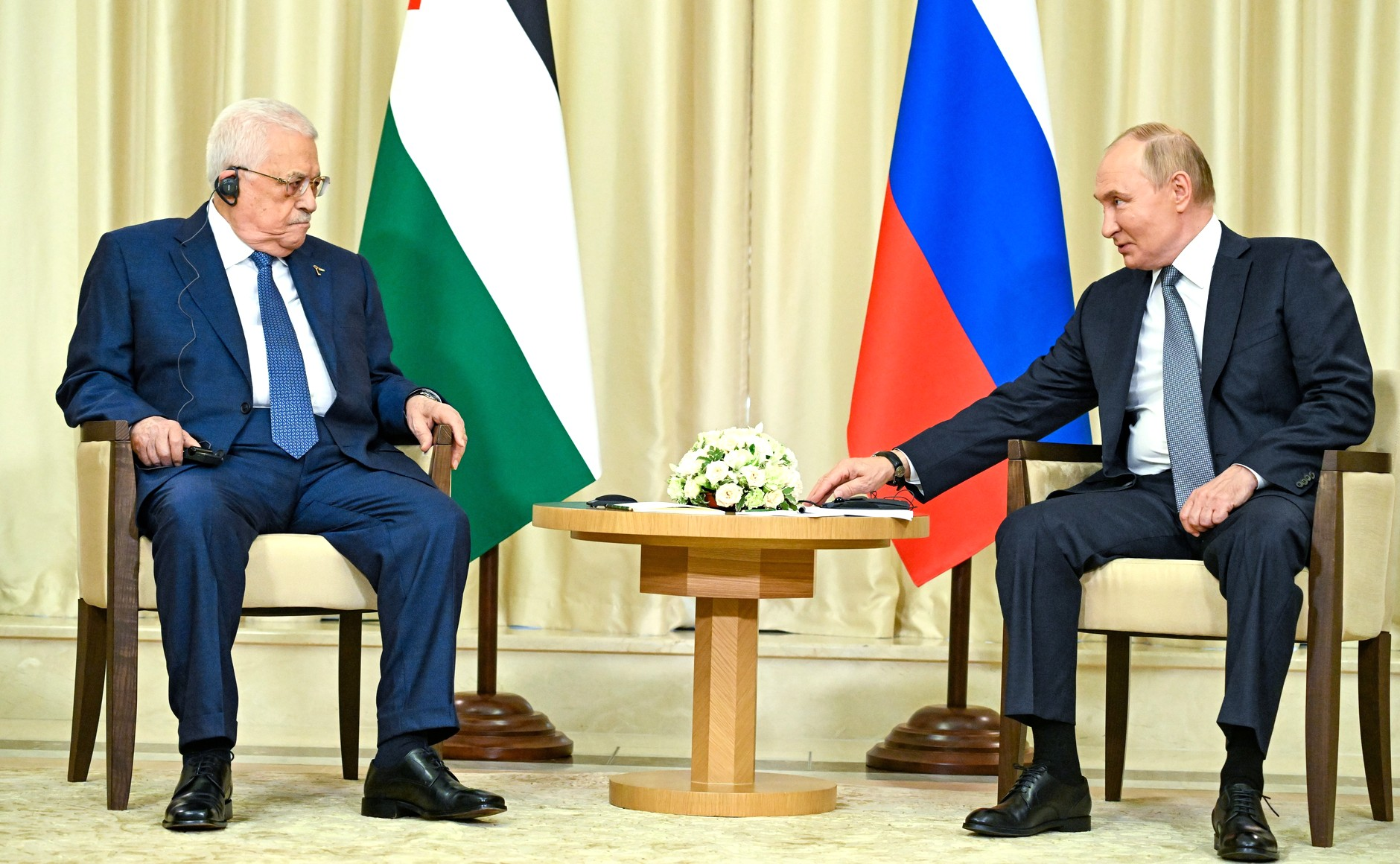
Abbas with Russian president Vladimir Putin in Novo-Ogaryovo, Russia, 13 August 2024

In August 2015, Abbas announced his resignation as chairman of the executive committee of the PLO, and subsequently called for an emergency meeting of the PNC to hold an election. The announcement drew criticisms and speculation as to his motives. His proposed special session of the PNC was postponed indefinitely, and he remains acting chairman of the PLC as of October 2023.

In 2021, local elections in Palestine were held amidst a rift between Abbas and Hamas. This was after he had indefinitely postponed the presidential election and parliamentary elections.

During the Gaza war, Abbas rejected "practices of killing civilians or abusing them on both sides because they contravene morals, religion and international law." He called for the "release of civilians, prisoners and detainees" and expressed concern about the consequences of Israel's total blockade of the Gaza Strip. Abbas declared three days of mourning following the Al-Ahli Arab Hospital explosion and canceled a planned meeting with U.S. president Joe Biden. In February 2024, he called the Al-Rashid humanitarian aid incident an "ugly massacre" that was perpetrated by the "Israeli occupation army." In April 2025, in his strongest remarks since the war began, Abbas condemned Hamas as "sons of dogs," blaming them for giving Israel justification to continue its assault on Gaza and demanding they release the Israeli hostages, disarm, and cede control of the territory.

=== Nomination of successor and possible retirement ===
At the age of 91, Abbas is one of the oldest world leaders ever. On 28 November 2024, after growing calls for him to quit, Abbas nominated Rawhi Fattouh, to be his temporary successor until elections are held when the time comes for Abbas to step down. In March 2025, Abbas announced that the long-awaited legislative election would be held and that a vice presidential post would be introduced.

The following month in April 2025, Abbas officially created the post of vice president and appointed Hussein al-Sheikh, the secretary general of the Executive Committee of the Palestine Liberation Organization, to the role, thus making him Abbas' likely successor when he steps down. In October of the same year, Abbas issued a decree which made al-Sheikh his temporary successor in event of the presidency being vacant.

== Political relations ==
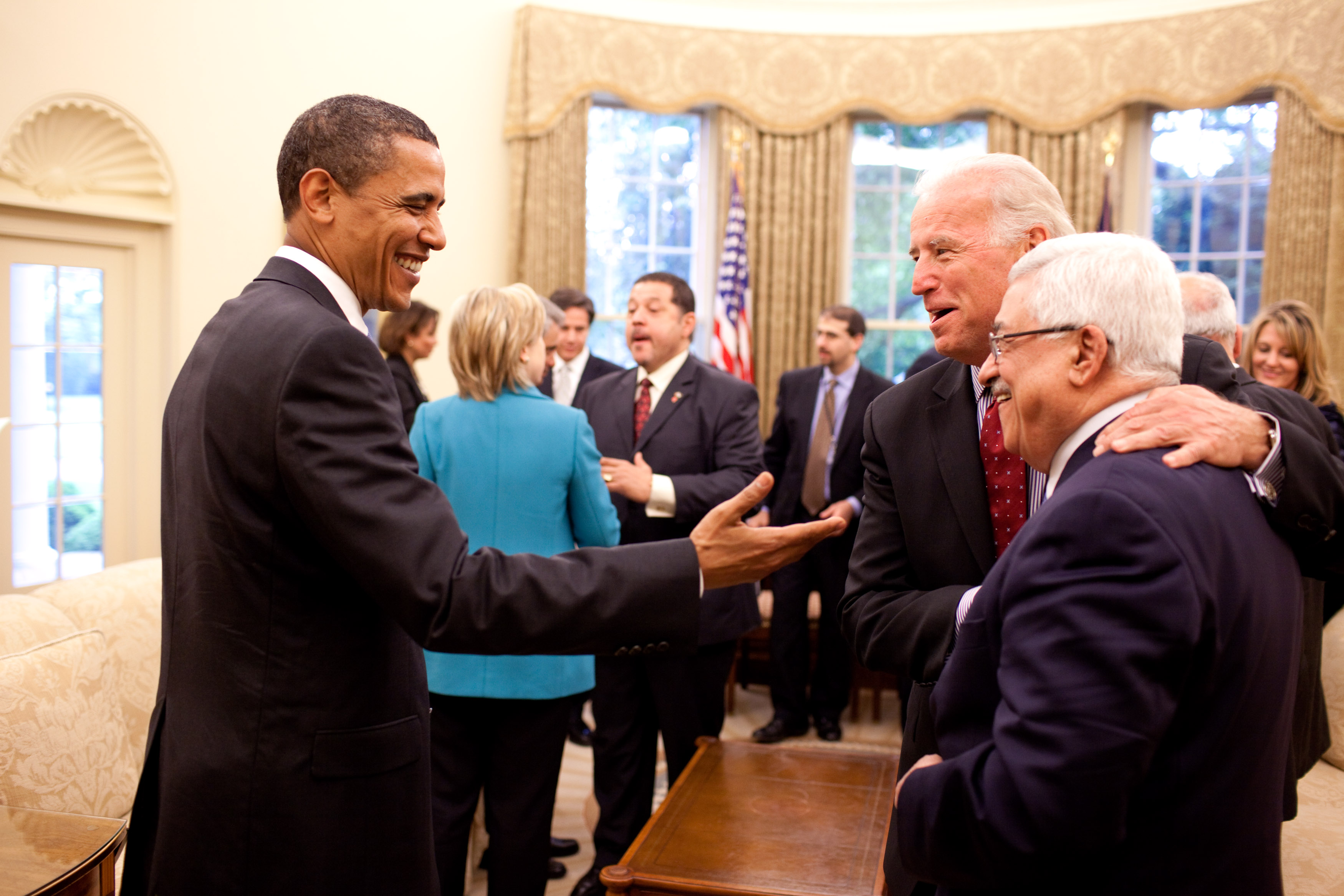
Abbas with President Barack Obama and Vice President Joe Biden in the Oval Office

=== Israel ===
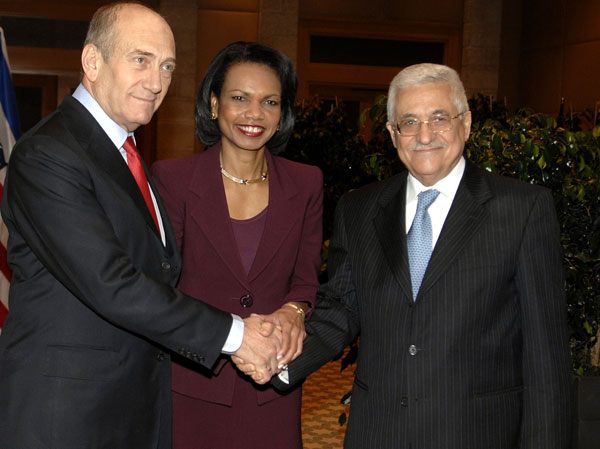
Abbas meets with then United States Secretary of State Condoleezza Rice and then Israeli prime minister Ehud Olmert

In January 2005, Israeli radio reported that Abbas had secured a thirty-day ceasefire from Hamas and Palestinian Islamic Jihad. On 12 February, lone Palestinians attacked Israel settlements and Abbas quickly fired some of his security officers for not stopping the attacks during the ceasefire.

In April 2005, Abbas said that the killing of three Palestinians in southern Gaza by Israeli soldiers was a deliberate violation of the declared ceasefire deal. "This violation is made on purpose," Abbas said in a written statement sent to reporters in the West Bank capital of Ramallah. Abbas made the statement shortly after three Palestinian teenage boys were shot dead by Israeli troops in the southern Gaza town of Rafah. Israel claimed they thought the boys were attempting to smuggle weapons, while Palestinians claimed a group of boys were playing soccer and three of them went to retrieve the ball near the border fence.

In July 2005, he announced that he would move his office to Gaza until the complete withdrawal of Israeli troops in order to coordinate the Palestinian side of the withdrawal, mediating between the different factions.

In March 2008, Abbas stated he was suspending peace talks with Israel, while Israeli prime minister Ehud Olmert vowed to press on with military operations against militants who have been launching home-made rockets into southern Israel.

In May 2008 Abbas said he would resign from his office if the current round of peace talks had not yielded an agreement in principle "within six months". He also said that the current negotiations were, in effect, deadlocked: "So far, we have not reached an agreement on any issue. Any report indicating otherwise is simply not true."

Abbas has since confirmed that he turned down an Israeli offer for a Palestinian state on nearly 95% of the West Bank. In September 2008, Olmert had presented him with a map that delineated the borders of the proposed PA state, for which Israel would annex 6.3 percent of the West Bank and compensate the Palestinians with 5.8 percent (taken from pre-1967 Israel), which Abbas stated he rejected out of hand, insisting instead to demarcate the 4 June 1967 borders of Palestine. He said that Olmert did not give a map of the proposal and that he could not sign without seeing the proposal. Abbas also said that he was not an expert on maps and pointed to Olmert's corruption investigation (he was later convicted). Abbas said in October 2011 that he made a counteroffer to let Israel annex 1.9% of the West Bank.

In 2012, Abbas floated the idea of accepting a two-state solution which outlined Palestine as existing within the 1967 borders with a capital in East Jerusalem. In an interview with Israeli Channel 2 TV, Abbas said, "It is my right to see [the Israeli city of Safed], but not to live there." The negative reaction to these words forced Abbas to backpedal.

According to an International Crisis Group report, most Israeli officials "do not see [Abbas] as a peace partner but consider [him] a nonthreatening, violence-abhorring, strategic asset."

In June 2016, Abbas repeated to the European Parliament a false press report that rabbis in Israel were calling for Palestinian wells to be poisoned. Abbas retracted the statement the following day, acknowledging that the claim was not true and stating that he "didn't intend to do harm to Judaism or to offend Jewish people around the world". Israel's prime minister Benjamin Netanyahu said Abbas's statement spread a "blood libel".

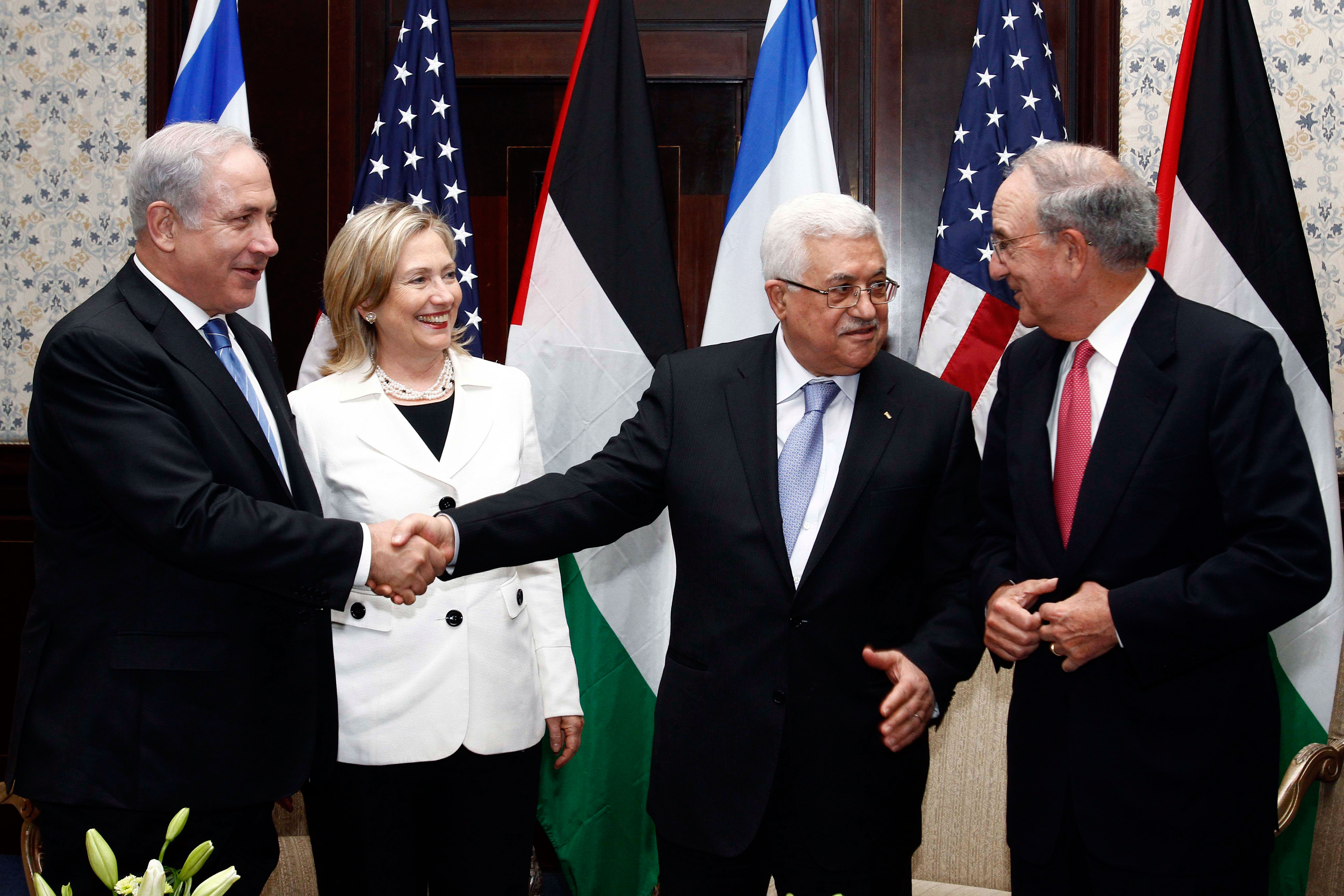
Abbas meets with then US secretary of state Hillary Clinton and Israeli prime minister Benjamin Netanyahu

=== Hamas ===
In May 2006, Abbas gave Hamas a ten-day deadline to accept the 1967 ceasefire lines.

In December 2006, Abbas called for new legislative elections, to bring an end to the parliamentary stalemate between Fatah and Hamas in forming a national coalition government.

In March 2007, a unity government was formed incorporating members of both Hamas and Fatah, with Ismail Haniyeh as prime minister and independent politicians taking many key portfolios.

In June 2007, Abbas dissolved the Hamas-led unity government of Haniyeh, declared a state of emergency, and appointed Salam Fayyad in his place. This followed action by Hamas armed forces to take control of Palestinian Authority positions controlled by Fatah militias. The appointment of Fayyad to replace Haniyeh has been challenged as illegal, because under the Palestinian Basic Law, the president may dismiss a sitting prime minister, but may not appoint a replacement without the approval of the Palestinian Legislative Council. According to the law, until a new prime minister is thus appointed, the outgoing prime minister heads a caretaker government. Fayyad's appointment was never placed before, or approved by the Legislative Council. For this reason, Haniyeh, the Hamas prime minister has continued to operate in Gaza, and is recognised by a large number of Palestinians as the legitimate acting prime minister. Anis al-Qasem, a constitutional lawyer who drafted the Basic Law, is among those who publicly declared Abbas's appointment of Fayyad to be illegal.

In June 2007, the European Union promised to resume direct aid to the Palestinian Authority, and Abbas dissolved the National Security Council, a sticking point in the defunct unity government with Hamas. That same day, the United States decided to end its fifteen-month embargo on the Palestinian Authority and resume aid, attempting to strengthen Abbas's West Bank government. A day later, the Fatah Central Committee cut off all ties and dialogue with Hamas, pending the return of Gaza.

In July 2023, Abbas met with Turkish president Recep Tayyip Erdoğan and Hamas leader Ismail Haniyeh. Behind the meeting was Turkey's effort to reconcile Fatah with Hamas.

In March 2024, Hamas and its allied groups in the Gaza Strip criticized Abbas' appointment of Mohamed Mustafa as the Palestinian Authority's new prime minister following Mohammed Shtayyeh's resignation. They issued a statement referring to the changes as "formal steps that are devoid of substance" and questioned the Palestinian Authority's ability to properly represent the Palestinian people. In response, Fatah condemned Hamas as being itself disconnected from the Palestinian people and accused them of "having caused the return of the Israeli occupation of Gaza" by "undertaking the October 7 adventure".

In March 2025, Abbas' party, Fatah, released a statement calling on Hamas to relinquish power in the Gaza Strip. Later in April 2025, Abbas issued his strongest condemnation of Hamas during a speech to the Palestinian Central Council in Ramallah. He referred to Hamas as "sons of dogs", stated the group gives Israel "excuses" to continue its attacks on Gaza, and demanded they "release the hostages and be done with it".

=== Foreign leaders ===
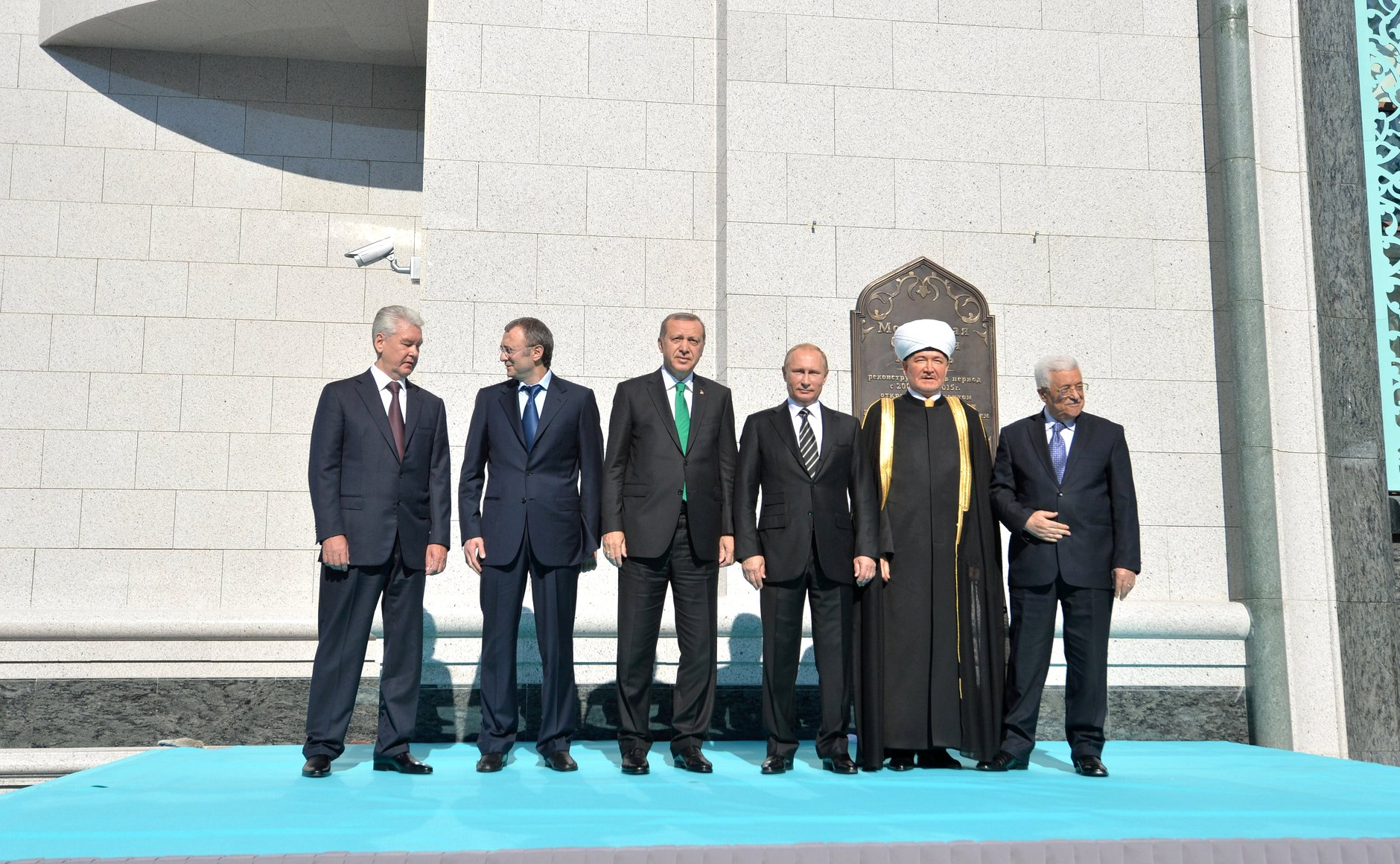
Abbas, Vladimir Putin, and Recep Tayyip Erdoğan opened Moscow's Cathedral Mosque, 23 September 2015.

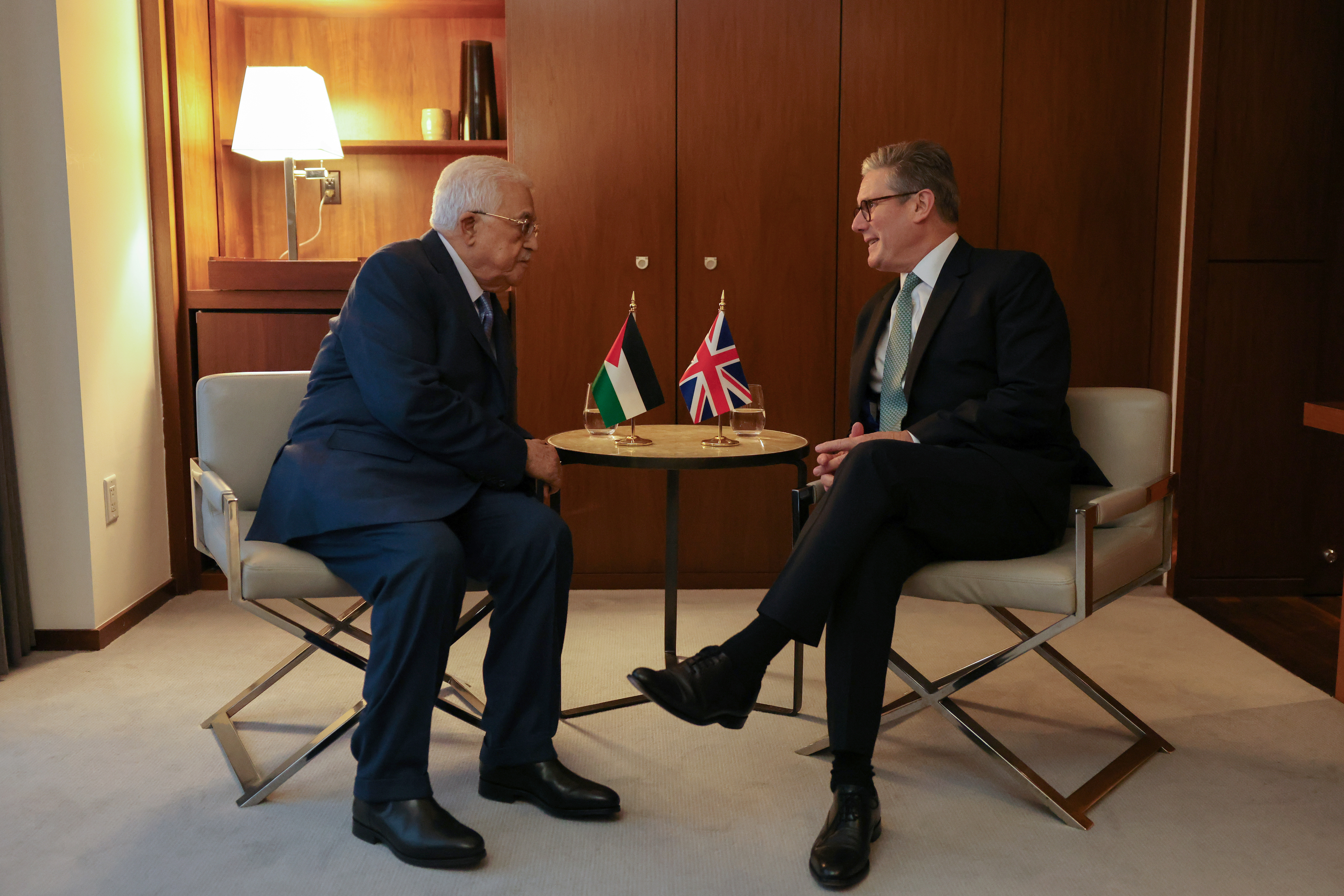
Abbas with British prime minister Keir Starmer in New York City, 25 September 2024

In May 2009, he welcomed Pope Benedict XVI to the West Bank, who supported Abbas's goal of a Palestinian State. Also in May 2009, Abbas made a visit to Canada, where he met with foreign affairs minister Lawrence Cannon and Prime Minister Stephen Harper. The same year Abbas visited Venezuela and met Hugo Chávez.

In February 2010, Abbas visited Japan for the third time as Palestinian president. In this visit he met Prime Minister Yukio Hatoyama. He also visited Hiroshima, the first such visit by a Palestinian leader, and spoke about the suffering of Hiroshima, which he compared to the suffering of the Palestinians.

In July 2012, Abbas accused former U.S. secretary of state Condoleezza Rice of fabricating a conversation between them and denied such a conversation took place. The specific quote he denied was, "I can't tell four million Palestinians only five thousand of them can go home," regarding the issue of Palestinian refugees. Abbas further said, "I'm not calling her a liar... I am saying we never had that conversation." In response, Rice denied that she fabricated it. Her chief of staff, Georgia Godfrey, wrote, "Dr. Rice stands by her account of the conversation and what she wrote in her book."

In January 2019, Abbas accepted the chairmanship of the United Nations' Group of 77, a coalition of 134 mainly developing nations and China, on behalf of Palestine, which is a non-member observer state of the UN. He was handed the gavel by Egypt's foreign minister Sameh Shoukry, the outgoing chairman.

Abbas made a state visit to China in 2023, and held talks with President Xi Jinping and met with Premier Li Keqiang.

== Criticism and controversy ==
=== Corruption allegations ===
Citing the 2012 corruption report by the Coalition for Accountability and Integrity, Al-Monitor characterized corruption in the Palestinian Authority as being "still rampant inside public Palestinian institutions despite the progress during the past year".

In 2003, CBS News reported that Yasser Arafat, Abbas's mentor and predecessor, had diverted nearly $1 billion in public funds to "insure his political survival". In a 2006 report, the Congressional Research Service characterised the Palestinian public's dissatisfaction with institutional corruption as a factor that contributed to a win by Hamas in the January 2006 parliamentary election. It noted that Fatah leaders had been accused of siphoning funds from ministry budgets, passing out patronage jobs, accepting favors and gifts from suppliers and contractors.

The source for specific allegations against Abbas was one of Arafat's most trusted aides, Mohammed Rashid, accused by the PA of embezzling hundreds of millions of dollars, who threatened to expose corruption scandals in the Palestinian Authority. For many years, Rashid served as Arafat's financial advisor and was given a free hand to handle hundreds of millions of dollars that were poured on the Palestinian Authority and the PLO by the US, the EU and Arab donors. According to Rashid, Abbas's net worth was US$100 million.

On 10 July 2012, Abbas and his sons were attacked, in the US Congress, for their alleged corruption. The debate was entitled Chronic Kleptocracy: Corruption Within the Palestinian Political Establishment. In his testimony before the House Committee on Foreign Affairs, Subcommittee on Middle East and South Asia, Elliott Abrams stated that "Corruption is an insidious destroyer not only of Palestinian public finance but of faith in the entire political system. And it has certainly had an impact on potential donors. I can tell you from my own experience, as an American official seeking financial assistance for the PA from Gulf Arab governments, that I was often told 'why should we give them money when their officials will just steal it?'"

The conspicuous wealth of Abbas's own sons, Yasser and Tarek, has been noted in Palestinian society since at least 2009, when Reuters first published a series of articles tying the sons to several business deals, including a few that had U.S. taxpayer support. In a Foreign Policy article, author Jonathan Schanzer suggested four ways in which the Abbas family has become rich. They include monopolies on American-made cigarettes sold in the territories; USAID funding; public works projects, such as road and school construction, on behalf of the Palestinian Authority; and special preferences for retail enterprises. It was strongly implied that the sons' lineage was the main credential in receiving these contracts.

One of his sons, Yasser Abbas (but not brother Tarek or father Mahmoud), filed a US$10 million libel lawsuit in the United States District Court, District of Columbia, in September 2012 against Foreign Policy Group LLC and Schanzer alleging "false and defamatory statements. It seems every statement will be challenged, in a jury trial, if the court accepts jurisdiction." Abbas also accused Schanzer of not contacting him for comment and of relying on untrustworthy sources of information. Abbas accused Schanzer of acting with malice and pursuing an agenda against the brothers, even though he also contended that he's a private citizen and not a public figure, so we wouldn't need to prove actual malice to win.

Some analysts believed the Abbas family would not proceed with the case as it would allow Foreign Policy and Schanzer to dig in too deep into the PA's secret finances and records. However, the case proceeded.

In September 2013, U.S. District Judge Emmet Sullivan dismissed the suit using D.C.'s anti-SLAPP measure. Sullivan determined the lawsuit intended to censor, intimidate, and silence critics by burdening them with the cost of a legal defense until they abandoned their criticisms or opposition. The decision has been appealed.

As part of the 2016 Panama Papers data leak, it was revealed that Abbas's son Tareq Abbas holds US$1 million in shares of an offshore company associated with the Palestinian Authority.

In June 2021, hundreds of Palestinians held protests against the Abbas administration's corruption and brutality in central Ramallah (including one held at the president's headquarters) after anti-corruption activist Nizar Banat died in government custody.

One of the common claims made by detractors against his government is that it works effectively as a subcontractor for the Israeli government; in spite of his strong verbal criticism of the Israeli government, there is widespread disdain for his administration within the Palestinian Authority.

=== Published works and statements about the Holocaust ===
The Connection between the Nazis and the Leaders of the Zionist Movement 1933–1945 is the title of Abbas's CandSc thesis, which was completed in 1982 at the Peoples' Friendship University of Russia, and defended at the Institute of Oriental Studies of the Soviet Academy of Sciences. The dissertation and book discussed topics such as the Haavara Agreement, in which the Jewish Agency signed a pact with Nazi Germany to facilitate Jewish emigration to Palestine. Some content of his thesis has been considered as Holocaust denial by some Jewish groups, especially where he disputed the accepted number of Jews murdered in the Holocaust and claimed Zionist agitation had been the cause of the Holocaust.

In 1984, he published a book titled The Other Side: the Secret Relationship Between Nazism and Zionism (Arabic: Al-Wajh al-Ākhar: Al-'Alāqat aL-Sirriyya bayn al-Nāzīyya wa al-Sahyūniyya) based on the dissertation. In the book Abbas dismissed as a "myth" and "fantastic lie" that six million Jews were murdered in the Holocaust, writing that the real figure was at most "890,000" or "a few hundred thousand". The number of such deaths, he claimed, had been exaggerated for political purposes, writing "it seems that the interest of the Zionist movement ... is to inflate this figure so that their gains will be greater. This led them to emphasize this figure [six million] in order to gain the solidarity of international public opinion with Zionism. Many scholars have debated the figure of six million and reached stunning conclusions—fixing the number of Jewish victims at only a few hundred thousand." When asked about this assertion in his book, Abbas replied some 10 years later that he had written the book when the Palestinians were at war with Israel, adding that "today I would not have made such remarks." In a March 2006 interview with Haaretz, Abbas stated:

I wrote in detail about the Holocaust and said I did not want to discuss numbers. I quoted an argument between historians in which various numbers of casualties were mentioned. One wrote there were 12 million victims and another wrote there were 800,000. I have no desire to argue with the figures. The Holocaust was a terrible, unforgivable crime against the Jewish nation, a crime against humanity that cannot be accepted by humankind. The Holocaust was a terrible thing and nobody can claim I denied it.

In August 2022, during a joint press conference with German Chancellor Olaf Scholz in Berlin, Abbas was asked by an attending journalist if he would apologize for the 1972 Munich massacre of Israeli Olympic athletes by Palestinian terrorists. He responded that "If we want to go over the past, go ahead. I have 50 slaughters that Israel committed… 50 massacres, 50 slaughters, 50 holocausts." In an interview afterwards with the Bild tabloid, Scholz condemned Abbas's statements as a trivialization of the Holocaust. The remarks were also condemned by the Israeli Ministry of Foreign Affairs. Following an offense report for "relativizing the Shoah", in Berlin a criminal investigation was opened by police to determine if Abbas is guilty of Volksverhetzung. The investigation was closed because Abbas enjoys diplomatic immunity.

In August 2023, during a speech to the Fatah Revolutionary Council, Abbas claimed that Hitler killed Jews because of their "social role" as moneylenders, rather than out of antisemitism, and that Ashkenazi Jews are descendants of Khazars. His comments were condemned by the United States, European Union, France, and Germany, while Mayor of Paris Anne Hidalgo rescinded Abbas's Medal of the City of Paris in response.

== Public image ==
=== Approval ratings ===
In 2012 and 2014, Abbas' approval ratings peaked at 64%. Since then, his ratings slowly declined. In 2017, Abbas' approval ratings was 45%, before eventually rising to 50% in 2018. From 2019 onwards, his ratings started to decline again and by 2021, nearly 80% of Palestinians wanted Abbas to resign.

In 2022, Abbas' approval was at 40% before falling to 32% in 2023. According to another poll released that same year, nearly 90% of Palestinians wanted him to resign as support for Hamas grew. In 2024, Abbas' ratings fell to 29%, with 59% of Palestinians disapproving of him. In May 2025, Abbas' ratings doubled down and hit an all-time low of just 19%, with 79% of Palestinians disapproving of him.

== Personal life ==
He is married to Amina Abbas, and together they had three sons. The eldest, Mazen Abbas, ran a building company in Doha and died in Qatar of a heart attack in 2002 at the age of 42. The kunya of Abu Mazen means "father of Mazen." Their second son is Yasser Abbas, a Canadian businessman who was named after former PA leader Yasser Arafat. The youngest son is Tareq, a business executive. Abbas has eight grandchildren, six of whom are part of the Seeds of Peace initiative bringing them in touch with young Israelis.

== Awards and honors ==
=== National ===
- Grand Collar of the Order of the State of Palestine (automatic upon taking presidential office)

=== Foreign ===
- National Order of Merit (Algeria, 2014)
- Order of Sheikh Isa bin Salman Al Khalifa (Bahrain, 2017)
- Order of Merit of Duarte, Sánchez and Mella (Dominican Republic, 2011)
- Collar of the Order of Mubarak the Great (Kuwait, 2013)
- Order of Nishan Izzuddin (Maldives, 2013)
- Grand Cross of the National Order of Merit (Mauritania, 2016)
- Order of Friendship (Russia, 2013)
- Sri Lanka Mitra Vibhushana (Sri Lanka, 2014)
- Grand Cross of the Order of the Republic (Tunisia, 2017)
- Grand Cross of the Order of Francisco de Miranda (Venezuela, 2014)
- Collar of the Order of the Star of Romania (Romania, 2022)

=== Confessional ===
- Order of Glory and Honor (Russian Orthodox Church, 2015)
- First Class of the Order of Al-Fakhr (Russian Council of Muftis, 2008)

=== Honorary citizenship ===
- Assisi (2014)
- Naples (2013)

=== Revoked ===
- Medal of the City of Paris (awarded in 2015 and revoked in 2023 following Abbas' Holocaust denial comments on that year)

== See also ==
- List of current heads of state and government
- Politics of Palestine
- List of Fatah members
- History of Palestine

Political offices
Vacant Title last held by Ahmed Hilmi Pasha as Prime Minister of Palestine	Prime Minister of the Palestinian National Authority; 2003	Succeeded by Ahmed Qurei
Preceded by Yasser Arafat	Chairman of the Palestine Liberation Organization; 2004–present	Incumbent
Preceded by Rawhi Fattouh; Acting	President of the Palestinian National Authority; 2005–present	Incumbent
Preceded by Yasser Arafat	President of Palestine; 2005–present	Incumbent
