= National Coalition for Justice and Democracy =

Palestinian political party

National Coalition for Justice and Democracy الائتلاف الوطني من أجل العدالة والديمقراطية
- Founder: Eyad El-Sarraj
- Founded: 2004
- Headquarters: Palestine
- Ideology: Palestinian nationalism Two-state solution
- Political position: Left-wing
- Colors: Desert sand Red; Green
- Legislative Council: 0 / 132

The National Coalition for Justice and Democracy (Arabic: الائتلاف الوطني من أجل العدالة والديمقراطية, Al-I’tilaf al-Watani lil Adala wal Democratiya’ Wa’ad), also known as Wa'ad (Arabic: وعد, Promise) was a Palestinian electoral list and political party that took part in the 2006 Palestinian legislative election.

== History ==
=== Foundation ===
The party was founded and led by a Gazan psychiatrist Eyad El-Sarraj, who was a consultant to the Palestinian delegation to the Camp David 2000 Summit. Prior to the 2006 election, El-Sarraj spoke out against the human rights violations and use of torture by the Palestinian Authority, which led to his arrest in 1995; he also founded the Gaza Community Mental Health Programme.

=== 2006 election ===
For the 2006 Palestinian legislative election, the National Coalition for Justice and Democracy was organized by a group of Israeli and Palestinian academics led by El-Sarraj that worked towards a peace agreement. It was placed as the 7th list on the voting ballot; it fielded 13 candidates in total, its electoral list comprising independents. The main proposals of the party were security reforms, establishing the rule of the law and respect for human rights. It claimed to challenge both the Israeli and Palestinian abuse.

According to The Guardian, while El-Sarraj was considered a "father figure" in Gaza, the independent party that he led did not match his popularity. In January 2005, the party was polling 1% nationwide - 1% in the West Bank and Gaza each, and 3% in Jerusalem; it was most popular in Tulkarm, where it polled 7%. In late December 2005, shortly before the election, it polled 3% nationwide. A week before the election, it polled around 2%.

In the days leading up to the election, Fatah led against Hamas in the polls, but narrowly - a poll by Birzeit University predicted Fatah winnings 63 seats, and Hamas - 58. The possibility of a deadlock led to discussions regarding the stances of third parties towards Fatah and Hamas, such as The Alternative, Palestinian Democratic Union, Third Way and the National Coalition for Justice and Democracy. The party declared that if it surpassed the electoral threshold of 2%, it would work with any party that supported its program.

It was critical of Fatah, stating that it had governed the Palestinian Authority "absolutely miserably in all aspects of life" and that it could only cooperate with Fatah legislators on an individual basis. In contrast, it was more welcoming towards Hamas, describing it as a "clean organization" while cautioning that it must commit itself to abandon terrorist acts and disarm its military wing, the Al-Qassam Brigades. Speaking of Hamas, El-Sarraj said: "Once they become part of the political community, there will be no tolerance for private militias."

Ultimately, the National Coalition for Justice and Democracy won 1806 votes, which amounted to 0.18% of the popular vote.

=== Aftermath ===
Political commentators noted that the party's electoral failure was part of a larger pattern of parties that focused on socio-economic reforms and human rights heavily underperforming in the Palestinian election. The Algemeiner Journal contended that the party's underwhelming performance showed that the voters did not vote for Hamas just to halt 'Fatah's corruption', but rather revealed a deeper agreement of Palestinians with the platform of Hamas.

The party released a statement after the election where it praised the electoral process, stating that "it went extremely well" despite the voters' apprehension about the civility of Fatah and Hamas, and thanking them for abiding by the democratic process. In a poll taken in June 2007, a year after the election, the National Coalition for Justice and Democracy polled 0.1% - including 0.2% in the West Bank.

In 2011, the party issued a joint statement with other Palestinian parties and organizations on the decision of the International Council of Human Rights to submit the Goldstone Report about the Israeli conduct in Gaza Strip to the International Security Council, writing that "this decision, although issued late, as an important step on the path of respecting Palestinians’ human rights." Eyad El-Sarraj died on 17 December 2013.

== Ideology ==
The main goal of the National Coalition for Justice and Democracy was to reach a peace agreement between Israel and Palestine. The platform of the party also stressed security reforms, establishing the rule of the law and respect for human rights as its main goals. The party postulated the necessity of establishing 'law and order' in Palestine, which was to be achieved by restructuring and reforming the Palestinian security forces. It claimed to challenge both the Israeli and Palestinian violations of human rights.

It was described as a "leftist party of intellectuals" with "leftist beliefs" that argues for non-violent resistance. It was also described as a moderate party, and a nationalist one, together with Palestinian Justice and the Third Way. Like other parties, it demanded an end to the Israeli occupation of the West Bank. The party called for the implementation of the road map for peace outlined by the president of the United States George W. Bush, as well as a negotiated peace agreement that would establish an independent Palestinian state.

== Electoral performance ==
=== Legislative Council ===
Election	Votes	%	Seats	+/–	Position
2006	1,806	0.18	0 / 132	New	10th

== See also ==
- List of political parties in the Palestinian National Authority
- Palestinian Arab Front
- Palestinian Democratic Union
- Third Way
- Palestinian National Initiative
