= 2006 Palestinian legislative election =

- 25 January 2006
- All 132 seats in the Palestinian Legislative Council; 67 seats needed for a majority
- Turnout: 71.18%
Party	Leader	Vote %	Seats	+/–
Hamas	Ismail Haniyeh	44.45	74	New
Fatah	Farouk Kaddoumi	41.43	45	−5
PFLP	Ahmad Sa'adat	4.25	3	New
The Alternative	Qais Abd al-Karim	2.92	2	New
Independent Palestine	Mustafa Barghouti	2.72	2	New
Third Way	Salam Fayyad	2.41	2	New
Independents	–	–	4	−31
This lists parties that won seats. See the complete results below.
Results by governorate
Prime Minister before	Prime Minister after
Ahmed Qurei; Fatah	Ismail Haniyeh; Hamas

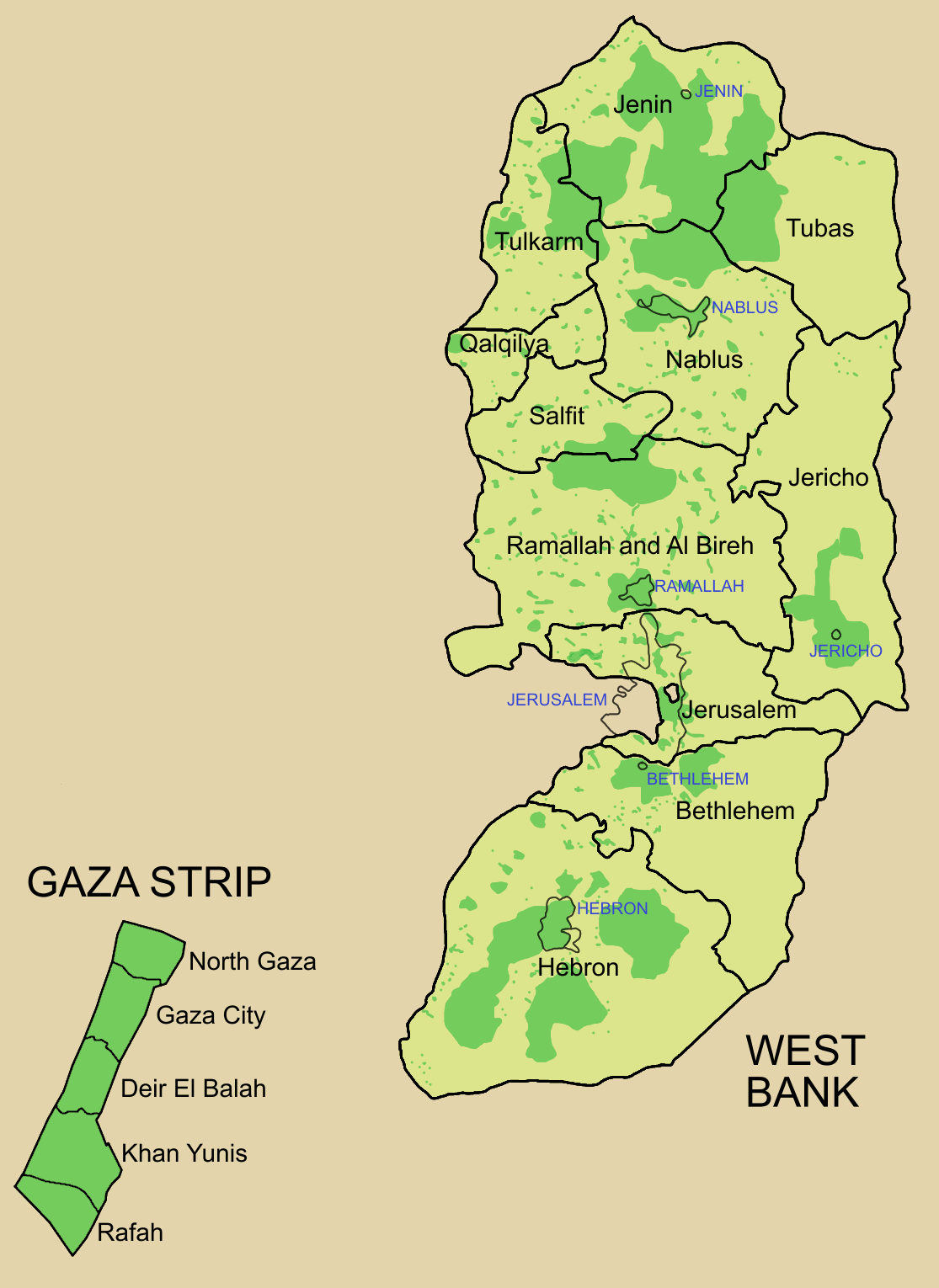
Map of the electoral districts and areas of formal Palestinian control (green)

Legislative elections were held in the Palestinian territories on 25 January 2006 in order to elect the second Palestinian Legislative Council (PLC), the legislature of the Palestinian National Authority (PNA). The result was a victory for Hamas, contesting under the list name of Change and Reform, which received 44.45% of the vote and won 74 of the 132 seats, whilst the ruling Fatah received 41.43% of the vote and won 45 seats.

The newly elected PLC met for the first time on 18 February 2006. Incumbent Prime Minister Ahmed Qurei tendered his resignation on 26 January 2006, but remained interim Prime Minister at the request of President Mahmoud Abbas. On 20 February, Hamas leader Ismail Haniyeh was nominated to form a new government. The new government with Haniyeh as Prime Minister was sworn in on 29 March. As of January 2026, no new elections have been held since this one.

== Background ==
The 2006 elections were the second elections to the PLC. The first elections took place in 1996, but the subsequent elections had been postponed for many years due to disagreements between Fatah and Hamas. Hamas was considered a terrorist organization by countries like the United States. Along with this, Yasser Arafat's cabinet called off the 2003 election because it claimed that the "Israeli military occupation of West Bank cities made a free ballot impossible".

After Arafat's death in 2004, a new election was held. In March 2005, twelve Palestinian factions reached an agreement, the Palestinian Cairo Declaration, which called for elections to be held using a mixed voting system rather than the majority electoral system used in 1996.

In June 2005, the PLC legislated to give effect to the Cairo Declaration, increasing its membership from 88 to 132, with half being elected by proportional representation and half by plurality-at-large voting in traditional constituencies. Palestinian voters in both the Gaza Strip and in the West Bank (including East Jerusalem) were eligible to participate in the elections. Earlier, the 2005 municipal elections and the 9 January 2005 presidential election had taken place.

The PLC elections were originally scheduled for 17 July 2005, but on 9 August Abbas announced that they would take place in January 2006. On 20 August Abbas set election day as 25 January. On 15 January 2006, Abbas declared that, despite unrest in Gaza, he would not change the election date unless Israel prevented Palestinians in East Jerusalem from voting. Israel had already stated that it would not allow campaigning in East Jerusalem by Hamas, which had carried out the majority of terror attacks against Israel in the previous five years and refused to recognise Israel or the Oslo Accords.

The United States spent $2.3 million in USAID on support for the Palestinian elections, allegedly designed to bolster the image of President Abbas and his Fatah party. USAID's Offices used discretionary spending accounts for various projects, including tree planting, schoolroom additions, a soccer tournament, street cleaning, and computers at community centers. USAID removed its usual branding requirement on its sponsored activities. As a result, the US was accused of trying to influence the outcome of the elections. The European Union supplied election observers to "assess the whole election process, including the legal framework, the political environment and campaign, electoral preparations, voting and counting as well as the post-election period".

== Electoral system ==
In the 1996 elections 88 PLC members were chosen from several multi-member constituencies via block voting. In advance of the 2006 elections, the electoral law was changed to enlarge the PLC from 88 to 132 seats and to introduce a degree of proportional representation via a parallel voting system. The mixed voting system divided PLC seats into two groups: 66 seats (50%) elected by proportional representation of the Palestinian territories as a single district, and 66 seats (50%) by the majoritarian system in electoral districts.

Each voter received two ballots. On the first, the voter chose one of the registered party lists. 66 of the seats were distributed proportionally (in accordance with the Sainte-Laguë method) to those lists that received more than 2% of the total list votes cast. The candidates from each list would be elected in the order they appear on the list. Each list had to include at least one woman in the first three names, at least one woman in the next four names, and at least one woman in the five names that followed.

The second ballot was for a voter's local electoral district, which may have more than one member to be elected. The voter could cast up to as many votes for individual candidates as there were seats in his or her district. Votes were unweighted, and the candidates with the most votes were elected. For example, a voter in the Nablus district could cast up to six votes; the six candidates with the highest number of votes were elected. In some districts, one or two seats were set aside for the Christian candidates with the most votes. For instance, in Ramallah, a five-seat district, the Christian candidate with the most votes was elected, even if the candidate was not among top five candidates overall. The six seats reserved for Christians were considered the minimum quota for their representation in the PLC.

There were 16 electoral districts, with the number of seats in each determined by its population:

- Jerusalem: 6 seats (2 reserved for Christians)
- Tubas: 1 seat
- Tulkarm: 3 seats
- Qalqilya: 2 seats
- Salfit: 1 seat
- Nablus: 6 seats
- Jericho: 1 seat
- Ramallah: 5 seats (1 reserved for Christians)
- Jenin: 4 seats
- Bethlehem: 4 seats (2 reserved for Christians)
- Hebron: 9 seats
- North Gaza: 5 seats
- Gaza City: 8 seats (1 reserved for Christians)
- Deir al-Balah: 3 seats
- Khan Younis: 5 seats
- Rafah: 3 seats
- Total: 66 seats (6 reserved for Christians)

== Campaign ==
=== Fatah ===
Before the 2006 elections the PLC was dominated by the Fatah movement, which held 68 of the 88 seats. However, Fatah had been beset by internal strife, with younger and more popular figures like Mohammed Dahlan (who took part in the negotiations of the 1993 Oslo Accords) and Marwan Barghouti (serving five life sentences in an Israeli jail on terrorism charges) levelling allegations of corruption against the Fatah leadership. Fatah organised primary elections to determine its candidate list, but the results were disputed and central lists were imposed in some areas. The younger faction submitted a list dubbed Al-Mustaqbal ("the Future"), headed by Barghouti. However, on 28 December 2005, the leaders of the two factions agreed to submit a single list to voters, headed by Barghouti, who actively campaigned for Fatah from his jail cell. Despite this, the two groups were by no means fully reconciled.

=== Change and Reform list ===
The Islamist Hamas movement campaigned as the Change and Reform list, and was Fatah's main political rival. It had refused to participate in the 1996 elections and viewed the Palestinian Authority as illegitimate due to its negotiations with Israel; while it did not change that position, it fielded candidates in 2006.

The prospect of a Palestinian Authority dominated by Hamas alarmed Western governments, which provided foreign aid that made up almost half of the PNA's budget. It was fear of a Hamas victory that was largely credited with driving the reconciliation between the main Fatah list and the Al-Mustaqbal breakaway faction.

=== Independent Palestine list ===
The Independent Palestine list was headed by Mustafa Barghouti, a distant relative of Marwan Barghouti. Mustafa Barghouti came in second in the 2005 Palestinian presidential election. The main component of this list was the Palestinian National Initiative. The list promised to fight corruption and nepotism, to demand the dismantling of the Israeli West Bank barrier, which it terms the "apartheid wall", and to provide "a truly democratic and independent 'third way' for the large majority of silent and unrepresented Palestinian voters, who favour neither the autocracy and corruption of the governing Fatah party, nor the fundamentalism of Hamas."

=== Abu Ali Mustafa ===
This list was formed by the Popular Front for the Liberation of Palestine and is named after Abu Ali Mustafa, the General Secretary of the PFLP who was assassinated by Israeli forces in 2001. The PFLP is the second largest member of the umbrella Palestine Liberation Organisation (PLO), after Fatah.

=== Third Way ===
The Third Way list was headed by Finance Minister Salam Fayyad and former PA Minister of Higher Education and Research Hanan Ashrawi. Their platform focused on reform of the security forces, democratic improvements and socioeconomic progress.

In the run up to the election a Fatah leader in Nablus accused the Third Way of receiving funds from the CIA.

=== The Alternative ===
The Alternative list was a coalition of the Democratic Front for the Liberation of Palestine, the Palestinian People's Party, the Palestine Democratic Union (Fida), and various independents. The list was headed by Qais Abd al-Karim (Abu Leila) from the DFLP. The PPP candidate received 2.67% in the 2005 Palestinian presidential election. In the list vote, its best vote was 6.6% in Bethlehem, followed by 4.5% in Ramallah and al-Bireh and 4.0% in Nablus.

=== National Coalition for Justice and Democracy ===
The National Coalition for Justice and Democracy list was headed by Gazan Eyad El-Sarraj, who was a consultant to the Palestinian delegation to the Camp David 2000 Summit and heads a group of Palestinian and Israeli academics working towards a peace agreement. The list's main platform is security reforms, establishing the rule of law and respect for human rights.

== Opinion polls ==
Date	Pollster	Sample size	Fatah	Hamas	Independent Palestine	Martyr Abu Ali Mustafa	The Alternative	Third Way	Others	Undecided
20–21 January 2006	Palestinian Public Opinion Polls	1,720	42.8%	34.2%	6.5%	6.6%	3.1%	4.8%	2%	–
5–6 January 2006	Palestinian Public Opinion Polls	1,360	39.3%	31.3%	10.4%	6.8%	1.4%	5.5%	3.6%	–
29–31 December 2005	PCPSR	4,560	43%	25%	5%	3%	2%	2%	＜2%	19%
Early December 2005	PCPSR	1,316	50%	32%	-	-	-	-	9%	9%

== Conduct ==
=== Israeli obstruction ===
In the lead-up to the elections, on 26 September 2005 Israel launched a campaign of arrests against PLC members. 450 members of Hamas were detained, mostly those involved in the 2006 PLC elections. The majority of them were kept in administrative detention for different periods. In the election period, 15 PLC members were captured and held as prisoners.

During the elections, the Israeli authorities banned the candidates from holding election campaigns inside Jerusalem. Rallies and public meetings were prohibited. The Jerusalem identity cards of some PLC members were also revoked. The Carter Center, which monitored the elections, criticised the detentions of persons who "are guilty of nothing more than winning a parliamentary seat in an open and honest election".

Israeli obstruction during the election resulted in estimated 123,000 voters in East Jerusalem being prevented from registering until ten days before the elections, creating a number of logistical problems shortly before the election day. The checkpoints of Israel also continued to pose serious obstacles to all Palestinian parties during the electoral campaign as well as on voting day itself. It was also noted that Palestinian refugees in exile and 9,000 prisoners remained ineligible to vote.

==== Voting in East Jerusalem ====
On 21 December 2005 Israeli officials stated their intention to prevent voting in East Jerusalem, which, unlike most of the Palestinian-inhabited areas that were planned to participate in the election, was under Israeli civil and military control. (Israel annexed East Jerusalem in the wake of the Six-Day War; this move was not recognized by most other governments, or by the PNA, which claims Jerusalem as a Palestinian capital.) Israel's stated motivation was not the argument about sovereignty over the area (Palestinian voters in East Jerusalem had been allowed to vote in previous PNA elections despite the dispute) but concern over Hamas' participation in—and potential victory in—the election. Muhammad Abu Tir, Mustafa Barghouti, and Hanan Ashrawi were all briefly detained by Israeli police when they attempted to campaign in East Jerusalem. In response, PNA officials stated that the election would not be held if East Jerusalem voters could not participate.

After privately agreeing to use the issue as a pretext for delaying the elections again so as to avoid Hamas electoral gains, Israeli and Palestinian officials raised the issue with the United States. However, President George W. Bush made clear that the elections should go forward as scheduled.

On 10 January 2006 Israeli officials announced that a limited number of Palestinians in East Jerusalem would be able to cast votes at post offices, as they did in 1996. Palestinian candidates will also be allowed to campaign in East Jerusalem as long as they register with Israeli police—and, a police spokesman noted, "Anyone who is a supporter of Hamas will not receive permission." The Israeli police arrested campaigners of Hamas and closed at least three Hamas election offices in East Jerusalem during the campaign.

On the day of the election, the ballot boxes were held in Israeli Post Offices inside Jerusalem. Israeli police officers were present to monitor the proceedings of the election. At the end of the day the Israeli authorities transferred the ballot boxes to the Palestinian Authority.

=== Atmosphere ===
An 84-delegate international observer delegation monitored the elections. It judged the elections to have been peaceful and well-administered. Twenty-seven members of the European parliament were included. Edward McMillan-Scott, the British Conservative head of the European Parliament's monitoring team described the polls as "extremely professional, in line with international standards, free, transparent and without violence". His colleague, Italian Communist MEP Luisa Morgantini said there was "a very professional attitude, competence and respect for the rules." All polling stations closed on time (7 p.m.) except for East Jerusalem, where voting was extended by the permitted two extra hours. Hamas protested this extension, claiming it only served Fatah; the Central Elections Committee stated that voting hours were "extended upon the approval of the Israeli authorities due to lengthy queues as a result of obstructions by post office workers."

The militant Islamist group Islamic Jihad called on Palestinians to boycott the election.

R. Michael Alvarez argued that "despite all the progress, however, the voting process was plagued by a series of manipulations. Violations were committed by both major political parties, namely Fatah and Hamas. Although, the observers reported, Hamas had an advantage in mobilizing Palestinian facilities for its own political purposes." Violating the code of conduct, Hamas was able to use its militias and networks for propaganda and intimidation purposes, as well as heavily utilizing mosques for that purpose. A national monitoring committee set up by the Arab Thought Forum recorded reports of 242 violations in total throughout the election. The Canadian International Development Agency reported that international observers were concerned "about the threat that widespread possession of arms poses to the future of the democratic electoral process." The threat of violence affected the conduct of the election, culminating in a few violent confrontations and undermining the independence of the Central Election Commission. The election also coincided with the period of intensified conflict with Israel - Palestinian armed groups fired hundreds of Qassam rockets into Israel between late 2005 and mid-2006, while Israel attacked Palestinian territory with 8000 artillery shells. In summer of 2006, Hamas captured an Israeli soldier, further escalating the conflict.

=== Exit polls ===
Exit polls indicated that Fatah emerged with more seats than Hamas, but not a majority of PLC seats. A poll conducted by the Palestinian Center for Policy and Survey Research estimated that Fatah had won 42% of the national vote and Hamas 35%; the margin of error was 4%. Another exit poll, conducted by Birzeit University, largely viewed as the most authoritative estimation, had Fatah with 46.4% of the vote and Hamas with 39.5%; their tentative prediction of seat allocation had Fatah with 63 seats, four short of a majority; Hamas 58; the Martyr Abu Ali Mustafa list 3; The Third Way 2; Independent Palestine 2; The Alternative 2; and two independents.

Leaders from both Hamas and Fatah, however, announced on Thursday morning that Hamas was expected to win a majority. Ismail Haniyeh, who topped the Change and Reform (Hamas) list claimed "Hamas has won more than 70 seats in Gaza and the West Bank". Another Hamas leader, Musheer al-Masri claimed the party expected to win 77 seats. Aljazeera reported Fatah officials conceding defeat. Prime minister Ahmed Qurei resigned on Thursday morning, along with his cabinet, saying it now fell to Hamas to form a government. Hamas leader al-Masri called for a "political partnership" with Fatah, but prominent Fatah leader, Jibril Rajoub, rejected a coalition and called on Fatah to form a "responsible opposition".

On the major single concerns governing voting, 37% considered it to be Safety and Security, while 25% favoured Decreased Corruption.

An exit poll conducted by Near East Consulting on 15 February 2006 on voters participating in the 2006 PA elections revealed the following responses to major concerns:

Support for a Peace Agreement with Israel: 79.5% in support; 15.5% in opposition
Should Hamas change its policies regarding Israel: Yes – 75.2%; No – 24.8%
Under Hamas corruption will decrease: Yes – 78.1%; No – 21.9%
Under Hamas internal security will improve: Yes – 67.8%; No – 32.2%
Hamas government priorities: 1) Combatting corruption; 2) Ending security chaos; 3) Solving poverty/unemployment
Support for Hamas' impact on the national interest: Positive – 66.7%; Negative – 28.5%
Support for a national unity government?: Yes – 81.4%; No – 18.6%
Rejection of Fatah's decision not to join a national unity government: Yes – 72.5%; No – 27.5%
Satisfaction with election results: 64.2% satisfied; 35.8% dissatisfied

World Public Opinion summarised the election voting drivers as follows:

The decisive victory of the militant Islamic group Hamas in last month's Palestinian legislative elections (winning 74 of 132 parliamentary seats) has raised the question of whether the Palestinian public has become aligned with Hamas' rejection of Israel's right to exist and its stated goal of creating an Islamic state covering all of historic Palestine, including what is now Israel. Hamas has come under increasing pressure to renounce its goal of eliminating Israel, but Hamas leaders have refused.

However, new polling following the election indicated that two-thirds of Palestinians believed Hamas should change its policy of rejecting Israel's right to exist. Most also supported a two-state solution to the Israeli-Palestinian conflict. Post-election polls indicated that Hamas' victory was due largely to Palestinians' desire to end corruption in government rather than support for the organization's political platform.

=== Independent Observer reactions ===
The National Democratic Institute (NDI) in partnership with The Carter Center reported "a professional and impartial performance of election officials". The European Union delegation reported "there was nothing which would indicate that the final result was not the outcome chosen by the voters". A CRS Report for Congress on the 2006 elections concluded: "The election was overseen by 17,268 domestic observers, complemented by 900 credentialed international monitors. ... The Bush Administration accepted the outcome of the Palestinian legislative elections and praised the PA for holding free and fair elections. ... The conduct of the election was widely considered to be free and fair."

== Results ==
The Central Elections Commission released the final results on Sunday, 29 January 2006, and announced that Change and Reform (Hamas) had won 74 of the 132 seats, while Fatah trailed with 45.

According to the results, Hamas won the large majority of the constituency seats but was more narrowly ahead on the lists. Fatah did beat Hamas in the constituencies in Qalqilya, Rafah, and Jericho. Jenin was split evenly, and Fatah won the seats reserved for Christians in Bethlehem, Jerusalem, and Ramallah.

The Central Elections Commission said turnout was 74.6%–76.0% in the Gaza Strip and 73.1% in the West Bank.

Party	Proportional			District			Total seats
Party	Votes	%	Seats	Votes	%	Seats	Total seats
Hamas	440,409	44.45	29	1,932,168	40.82	45	74
Fatah	410,554	41.43	28	1,684,441	35.58	17	45
Martyr Abu Ali Mustafa	42,101	4.25	3	140,074	2.96	0	3
The Alternative	28,973	2.92	2	8,216	0.17	0	2
Independent Palestine	26,909	2.72	2				2
Third Way	23,862	2.41	2				2
Palestinian Popular Struggle Front	7,127	0.72	0	8,821	0.19	0	0
Palestinian Arab Front	4,398	0.44	0	3,446	0.07	0	0
Martyr Abu al-Abbas	3,011	0.30	0				0
National Coalition for Justice and Democracy	1,806	0.18	0				0
Palestinian Justice	1,723	0.17	0				0
Palestinian Democratic Union				3,257	0.07	0	0
Independents				953,465	20.14	4	4
Total	990,873	100.00	66	4,733,888	100.00	66	132
Valid votes	990,873	95.05		1,000,246	95.95		
Invalid votes	29,864	2.86		31,285	3.00		
Blank votes	21,687	2.08		10,893	1.04		
Total votes	1,042,424	100.00		1,042,424	100.00		
Registered voters/turnout	1,350,655	77.18		1,350,655	77.18		
Source: CEC

== Analysis ==
According to Rashid Khalidi, the result of the vote was largely a repudiation of Fatah and not an endorsement of "Islamist governance or heightened armed resistance to Israel." Khalidi cites Hamas winning majority Christian areas as evidence that many voters' motivation was "to throw out the Fatah incumbents, whose strategy had failed and who were seen as corrupt and unresponsive to popular demands."

== Aftermath ==
=== New government ===
Prime Minister Ahmed Qurei resigned, but at the request of President Mahmoud Abbas, remained as interim Prime Minister until 19 February 2006. On 29 March 2006 a new government was formed by Hamas leader Ismail Haniyeh.

=== Jericho prison raid ===
After the election, Hamas indicated that it was considering releasing Palestinian prisoners, including Ahmad Sa'adat, being held in prison in Jericho for the assassination of far-right Israeli politician Rehavam Ze'evi. In response, the IDF launched a raid on the prison and took Sa'adat and five other security prisoners into custody.

=== Detention of Ministers and MPs ===
After the kidnapping of Israeli soldier Gilad Shalit on 25 June 2006, Israel launched a series of raids into Gaza and the West Bank. Israel destroyed civilian infrastructure and arrested dozens of Hamas supporters, including elected cabinet ministers and members of the PLC. On 28 June overnight, the army invaded Gaza and performed airstrikes, bombing infrastructure such as bridges and an electricity station. On 29 June, the IDF detained from the West Bank 8 ministers and 26 PLC members in addition to many other political leaders. By August 2006, Israel had arrested 49 senior Hamas officials, all from the West Bank, including 33 parliamentarians, "because technically they were members of a terrorist organisation although they may not be involved in terrorist acts themselves". Most of the Hamas detainees were moderate members from the West Bank who had been calling on the Gaza leadership to recognise Israel and make the party more acceptable to the international community. Hamas has accused Israel of trying to destroy the Hamas-led Palestinian Authority.

=== Sanctions ===
Economic sanctions against the Palestinian National Authority and individual PLC members elected for Hamas were imposed by Israel and the Quartet on the Middle East against the Palestinian National Authority and the Palestinian territories The Quartet set three conditions for the Hamas-led government—recognition of the agreements signed between Israel and the PLO, recognition of Israel, and renunciation of support for terrorism—all three of which Hamas refused. These demands were made without any offer of reciprocal concessions towards the Palestinians.

On 28 January 2006, Israel said it would prevent Hamas leaders, including newly elected PLC deputies, from travelling between the Gaza Strip and the West Bank. On 29 January, Israeli Prime Minister Ehud Olmert stated that he would not allow the transfer of any funds that would be used for terrorism and the matter was under review. US Secretary of State Condoleezza Rice declared that: "[T]he United States is not prepared to fund an organization that advocates the destruction of Israel, that advocates violence and that refuses its obligations under the roadmap to which everyone is committed." US senators echoed this sentiment saying that the US should not provide aid to the Palestinian Government unless Hamas accepted these conditions. On 17 February, one day before the new parliament was sworn in, the then Fatah-led government returned $50 million US aid that Washington did not want to come in the hands of the new government. The money had been intended for infrastructure projects in Gaza.

On 30 January, the Quartet called for reviewing support for the future government against its commitment to the principles of nonviolence, recognition of Israel, and acceptance of previous agreements and obligations, including the Roadmap.

Then-British Foreign Secretary Jack Straw later regretted the 30 January decision, writing in his memoirs he was "uncertain it was right", while Tony Blair later wished the Quartet had instead tried to enter a dialogue with Hamas, rather than isolate them. Similarly, in 2017, Jonathan Powell called the Quartet approach a "terrible mistake" and missed opportunity to "unite Palestinians in a way that's been impossible since".

=== Questioning the right to govern ===
Prior to the 2006 elections, Israel had concerns that Hamas might win enough seats that it could demand a position in government. US President George Bush was not willing to press for Hamas' exclusion from the election process. Abu Mazen (Abbas) was confident that Fatah would win the elections, as was Bush, who urged that the elections should take place. The Guardian observed that the unforeseen election win by Hamas "was seen as an affront to the central premise of the Bush administration's policy in the Middle East: that democratic elections would inexorably lead to pro-western governments".

=== Fatah post-election impediments ===
PA Prime Minister Qureia and his Cabinet resigned even before the final results were officially announced. Fatah refused to join a new Hamas-led coalition. President Abbas would ask Hamas to form the next Government. On 26 January 2006, Fatah leader Saeb Erakat said his party did not want to join a Hamas Government. The Fatah Central Committee decided that Fatah will not join the next Government, but said it would depend on President Abbas. On 28 January 2006, Hamas declared it would try to form a Government of technocrats, if a government with Fatah and all the political groups was not possible. On 29 January 2006, PLC deputies from Fatah confirmed after talks with Abbas that their faction would not join Hamas in a coalition Government and would prefer to sit in opposition, despite calls by Hamas for a "political partnership". The decision was, however, not discussed and ratified by the Fatah Central Committee.

Hamas formed a government without Fatah, the secular party that had dominated Palestinian politics for decades. Ismail Haniyeh was nominated as Prime Minister on 16 February 2006 and sworn in on 29 March 2006. Conditions on the ground deteriorated almost immediately, as Fatah did not take defeat easily. Fatah-Hamas tensions were expressed in a significant deterioration of law and order, and incidents of open violence between the two groups led to dozens of deaths, particularly in the Gaza Strip. In September 2006, with Fatah support, the public sector, which had hardly been paid since March, went on strike. The Fatah "inclusionists" wanted to help Hamas become more moderate, so that a coalition would become possible. Fatah's "old guard," on the other hand, wanted to exclude Hamas from the political process, by ensuring its failure.

After months of intermittent talks, on 8 February 2007, Fatah and Hamas signed an agreement to form a national unity government aimed at ending both the spasm of violence and the international aid embargo that followed the formation of the initial Hamas-led government.

After Hamas took over the Gaza Strip on 14 June 2007, Palestinian Authority Chairman Mahmoud Abbas dismissed the Hamas-led coalition government, and on 15 June appointed Salam Fayyad as Prime Minister to form a new government. Hamas objected to this move as being illegal. Though the new government's authority is claimed to extend to all Palestinian territories, in effect it is limited to the Palestinian Authority-controlled areas of the West Bank and excludes Gaza. Thus Hamas' right to lead a Palestinian Authority government had come to an end.

=== US post-election impediments ===
Just before the January 2006 elections, and after witnessing Hamas' gains in municipal polls, the House of Representatives passed H.Res. 575 (16 December 2005), asserting that terrorist groups, like Hamas, should not be permitted to participate in Palestinian elections until such organizations "recognize Israel's right to exist as a Jewish state, cease incitement, condemn terrorism, and permanently disarm and dismantle their terrorist infrastructure." The Palestinian Authority chose to ignore this external decision: "the Palestinian Authority (PA) president Mahmoud Abbas has favored an unconditional acceptance of Hamas's electoral participation, believing that it could co-opt Hamas within the Palestinian political fold" according to the WINEP.

The New York Times reported in February 2006 that "The United States and Israel are discussing ways to destabilize the Palestinian government so that newly elected Hamas officials will fail and elections will be called again. The intention is to starve the Palestinian Authority of money and international connections to the point where, some months from now, its president, Mahmoud Abbas, is compelled to call a new election."

Just how much further matters would be taken was revealed in April 2008. Tom Segev (in Ha'aretz) reported:

a "confidential document, a 'talking points' memo, was left by the U.S. consul general in Jerusalem, Jake Walles, on the desk of Mahmoud Abbas . … According to the paper left behind … he wanted to pressure Abu Mazen to take action that would annul the outcome of the elections that had catapulted Hamas to power. … When nothing happened, Walles … warned the Palestinian president that the time had come to act. Instead, Abu Mazen launched negotiations with Hamas on the establishment of a unity government. … At this point the Americans moved to "Plan B." That was a plan to eliminate Hamas by force. In fact, it was to be a deliberately fomented civil war Fatah was supposed to win, with U.S. help."

In April 2008 Vanity Fair published "The Gaza Bombshell":

There is no one more hated among Hamas members than Muhammad Dahlan, long Fatah's resident strongman in Gaza. Dahlan, who most recently served as Abbas's national-security adviser, has spent more than a decade battling Hamas. ... Bush has met Dahlan on at least three occasions. After talks at the White House in July 2003, Bush publicly praised Dahlan as "a good, solid leader." In private, say multiple Israeli and American officials, the U.S. president described him as "our guy."

Vanity Fair has obtained confidential documents, since corroborated by sources in the U.S. and Palestine, which lay bare a covert initiative, approved by Bush and implemented by Secretary of State Condoleezza Rice and Deputy National Security Adviser Elliott Abrams, to provoke a Palestinian civil war. The plan was for forces led by Dahlan, and armed with new weapons supplied at America's behest, to give Fatah the muscle it needed to remove the democratically elected Hamas-led government from power. (The State Department declined to comment.)

Some sources call the scheme "Iran-contra 2.0," recalling that Abrams was convicted (and later pardoned) for withholding information from Congress during the original Iran-contra scandal under President Reagan. There are echoes of other past misadventures as well: the C.I.A.'s 1953 ouster of an elected prime minister in Iran, which set the stage for the 1979 Islamic revolution there; the aborted 1961 Bay of Pigs invasion, which gave Fidel Castro an excuse to solidify his hold on Cuba; and the contemporary tragedy in Iraq.

The Jerusalem Post confirmed that the documents cited by Vanity Fair "have been corroborated by sources at the US State Department and Palestinian officials", and added:

The report said that instead of driving its enemies out of power, the US-backed Fatah fighters inadvertently provoked Hamas to seize total control of the Gaza Strip in June 2007. David Wurmser, who resigned as Vice President Dick Cheney's chief Middle East adviser a month after the Hamas takeover, said he believed that Hamas had no intention of taking over the Gaza Strip until Fatah forced its hand. "It looks to me that what happened wasn't so much a coup by Hamas but an attempted coup by Fatah that was preempted before it could happen," he was quoted as saying. Wurmser said that the Bush administration engaged in a "dirty war in an effort to provide a corrupt dictatorship [led by Palestinian Authority President Mahmoud Abbas] with victory." Wurmser said he was especially galled by the Bush administration's hypocrisy. "There is a stunning disconnect between the president's call for Middle East democracy and this policy," he said. "It directly contradicts it.".

The original article was cited by the Irish Times, the Israeli historian and political analyst, Tom Segev, in an article entitled "Bay of Pigs in Gaza", and also by Suzanne Goldenburg of The Guardian, who added "A state department memo put the cost for salaries, training and weapons at $1.27bn (£640m) over five years."

The 2008 exposé by Vanity Fair (of plans to reverse the democratic 2006 PA parliamentary elections) confirmed a CF Report of January 2007, over a year earlier, by Alistair Crooke:

Deputy National Security Advisor, Elliott Abrams ... has had it about for some months now that the U.S. is not only not interested in dealing with Hamas, it is working to ensure its failure. In the immediate aftermath of the Hamas elections, last January, Abrams greeted a group of Palestinian businessmen in his White House office with talk of a "hard coup" against the newly-elected Hamas government — the violent overthrow of their leadership with arms supplied by the United States. While the businessmen were shocked, Abrams was adamant — the U.S. had to support Fatah with guns, ammunition and training, so that they could fight Hamas for control of the Palestinian government.

Over the last twelve months, the United States has supplied guns, ammunition and training to Palestinian Fatah activists to take on Hamas in the streets of Gaza and the West Bank. A large number of Fatah activists have been trained and "graduated" from two camps — one in Ramallah and one in Jericho. The supplies of rifles and ammunition, which started as a mere trickle, has now become a torrent (Haaretz reports the U.S. has designated an astounding $86.4 million for Abu Mazen's security detail), and while the program has gone largely without notice in the American press, it is openly talked about and commented on in the Arab media.

Of course, in public, Secretary Rice appears contrite and concerned with "the growing lawlessness" among Palestinians, while failing to mention that such lawlessness is exactly what the Abrams plan was designed to create."

Voice of America reported that the Bush administration had denied the Vanity Fair report.

In 2016 a 2006 audio tape emerged that contains an interview by Eli Chomsky of the Jewish Press with Hillary Clinton. Clinton opined that pushing for elections "in the Palestinian territories ... was a big mistake", adding "(a)nd if we were going to push for an election, then we should have made sure that we did something to determine who was going to win."

=== Israeli post-election impediments ===
On 31 January 2006, Israel's Defence Minister Mofaz said Hamas' election victory gives Israel an incentive to decide in favour of a unilateral withdrawal from the West Bank and that Israel would have to set new defensible borders for itself.

In February 2006 the BBC reported:

Israel's cabinet has approved punitive sanctions on the Palestinian Authority, now dominated by militant group Hamas. Israel will withhold an estimated $50m (£28m) in monthly customs revenues due to the Palestinian Authority, as well as impose travel restrictions on Hamas members.

In 1997 the US Secretary of State at the time, Madeleine Albright, had characterised such withholdings by Israel of revenue funds from the Palestinian authorities as illegal.

In June 2006 an Israeli military official said a total of 64 Hamas officials were arrested in the early morning round-up. Of those, Palestinian officials said seven were ministers in Hamas' 23-member Cabinet and 20 others were MPs in the 72-seat parliament. "We have no government; we have nothing. They have all been taken," said Saeb Erekat, an ally of the moderate Palestinian president, Mahmoud Abbas.

In June 2007 the Washington Post reported: "Hamas ... leaders have accused Fatah's security services of working on behalf of Israeli and American interests because of a $40 million U.S. aid package to strengthen Abbas's forces. ... The Israeli government has openly supported Fatah forces against Hamas, whose tightening control of Gaza alarmed Israeli defense officials."

In a wikileaks cable dated 13 June 2007, Shin Bet security chief Yuval Diskin told U.S. Ambassador to Israel Richard Jones that: "Fatah had thus turned to Israel for help in attacking Hamas", which he termed a new and unprecedented development in Jerusalem's relations with the Palestinian Authority.

In the cable sent to Washington, Jones said that Yadlin had been quite satisfied with Hamas' seizure of the Gaza Strip. If Hamas managed to take complete control, then the Israel Defense Forces would be able to treat Gaza as a hostile territory and stop looking at the militant group as an undiplomatic player, Yadlin apparently told Jones."

== See also ==
- Blockade of the Gaza Strip
- Israeli–Palestinian conflict
