= Eyad al-Sarraj =

Palestinian psychiatrist (1944–2013)

Eyad Al-Sarraj
- إياد السراج

President of Faculty for Israeli-Palestinian Peace International
- In office ?–?

Personal details
- Born: Beersheba, Mandatory Palestine
- Died: Hadassah Medical Center, Jerusalem
- Spouse: Nirmeen Kharma
- Children: Sayf, Wasseem, and Ali
- Occupation: Psychiatrist, human rights activist
- Known for: Founding the Gaza Community Mental Health Programme, advocating for the mental health of Palestinians, working towards Israeli-Palestinian peace
- Awards: Martin Ennals Award for Human Rights Defenders (1998), Olof Palme Prize (2010), Physicians for Human Rights Awards

Eyad El-Sarraj (Arabic: إياد السراج; 27 April 1944 − 17 December 2013) was a Palestinian psychiatrist. He was a consultant to the Palestinian delegation at the Camp David 2000 Summit, a recipient of the Physicians for Human Rights Awards and featured in Army of Roses, a book about Palestinian female suicide bombers by journalist Barbara Victor. In the Palestinian elections of 2006, he headed the Wa'ad list. He died in 2013.

== Early life and education ==
Eyad El-Sarraj was born in Beersheba, Mandatory Palestine to a Palestinian Arab Muslim family. His family fled to the Gaza Strip as refugees in 1948, when he was four years old, following the creation of the State of Israel.

In the 1970s, he pursued medical studies at the University of Alexandria in Egypt, later continuing his education in the United Kingdom. He graduated with a Master’s degree from the Institute of Psychiatry at King’s College London. Upon returning from London in 1977; he became the Gaza Strip’s first psychiatrist.

== Career ==
Al-Sarah spoke out against the human rights violations and use of torture by the Palestinian Authority, which led to his arrest in 1995.

Al-Sarraj wrote a personal reflection in 1997 about "Why We Have Become Suicide Bombers: Understanding Palestinian Terror" in which he delineated several factors including living "under Israeli occupation." Among other things, he wrote, it means travel restrictions, having an undefined nationality, being asked to spy on your family, dealing with checkpoints, being belittled and seeing the prophet being humiliated.

Al-Sarraj was concerned about the "mental health damage caused by political oppression and challenged both Israeli and Palestinian abuses", having been imprisoned at various times by both Israel and by Yasser Arafat's Palestinian Authority.

On 29 June 2009, Al-Sarraj appeared before the United Nations Fact Finding Mission on the Gaza Conflict. He appeared as a witness on behalf of the "Gaza Community Mental Health Programme" stating that 20% of the children in Gaza suffered from posttraumatic stress disorder (PTSD).

The "Gaza Community Mental Health Programme" (GCMHP) was founded by al-Sarraj, and has 40 members on staff.

El-Sarraj was President of Faculty for Israeli-Palestinian Peace International, and a member of many other health organizations.

In November 1998 El Sarraj was awarded the Martin Ennals Award for Human Rights Defenders. El-Sarraj also received the Olof Palme Prize in 2010 for his "self-sacrificing and indefatigable struggle for common sense, reconciliation and peace between Palestine and Israel".

"I am proud and happy to receive this prize, but I consider that the real heroes are the victims of violence, torture and war… This prize gives me hope and encourages me to continue to fight to defend those whose rights have been abused, and to work for justice and peace," El-Sarraj said after receiving the award.

In 2004, Al-Sarraj was one of a group of Israeli and Palestinian academics who founded the National Coalition for Justice and Democracy, a Palestinian electoral list and political party that took part in the 2006 Palestinian legislative election.

The party won 1806 votes, which amounted to 0.18% of the popular vote.

== Personal life ==
During his time in Britain, he married an English woman, with whom he had two sons, Ahmed-Saif and Waseem. The couple later divorced. In 2004, Dr Sarraj remarried in Gaza.

Al-Sarraj was diagnosed with multiple myeloma in 2006. He went through stem cell transplantation. However, he had a relapse in 2013; and sought medical treatment at Hadassah Hospital Medical Center in Israel. He died on 18 December 2013. He was survived by his wife, Nirmeen; their son, Ali, aged seven; and his two sons from his first marriage.
