= Palestinian Cairo Declaration =

2005 agreement among Palestinian factions

The Palestinian Cairo Declaration was a declaration signed on 19 March 2005 by twelve Palestinian factions, including Fatah, Hamas, Islamic Jihad, Popular Front for the Liberation of Palestine (PFLP) and Democratic Front for the Liberation of Palestine (DFLP). The Cairo Declaration affirmed the status of the Palestine Liberation Organization (PLO) as the sole legitimate representative of the Palestinian people through the participation in it of all forces and factions according to democratic principles. The Declaration implied a reform of the PLO by the inclusion in the PLO of Hamas and Islamic Jihad.

The signatories included Fatah, headed by Mahmoud Abbas and Hamas, headed by Khalid Mash'al.

== Background ==
A major point of disagreement between the large factions of Hamas and Fatah (including the PLO) was – and still is – that Fatah has formally denounced armed resistance, whereas Hamas still promotes armed struggle against the Israeli occupation.

Yasser Arafat, the President of the Palestinian Authority, died on 11 November 2004. The Palestinian presidential election to fill the position took place on 9 January 2005 in both the West Bank and Gaza, but were boycotted by both Hamas and Islamic Jihad. The election resulted in PLO chairman Mahmoud Abbas being elected President to a four-year term.

On 16 February 2005, the Israeli parliament (the Knesset) approved the Israeli disengagement from Gaza, which would have drastically changed Israeli–Palestinian relations in Gaza.

The Cairo Declaration, signed on 19 March 2005 at the end of a 3-days meeting in Cairo, was an early conciliation attempt with the aim to unite the Palestinian factions against the Israeli occupation, restructure the PLO and avoid further violent interactions between the Palestinian groups.

The Israeli withdrawal from Gaza was unilaterally completed by 12 September 2005.

== Details ==
The Declaration contains 6 points:

1. it recalled the "right of the Palestinian people to resistance in order to end the occupation", the right to establish a Palestinian state with Jerusalem as its capital, and the Palestinian right of return.
2. it advocated the continuation of the Palestinian "atmosphere of calm in return for Israel's adherence to stopping all forms of aggression" against Palestinian land and people.
3. it warned against the Israeli West Bank barrier and the Judaization of Jerusalem.
4. it observed the necessity of completing the reform of Palestinian matters, including democracy, local and legislative elections and the introduction of an election system on the basis of proportional representation.
5. it stated that the parties agreed to reform the PLO "in order to include all the Palestinian powers and factions, as the organization is the sole legitimate representative of the Palestinian people". A committee would be made up to define the bases for the development.
6. it emphasized "that dialogue is the sole means of interaction among all the factions, as a support to national unity and the unity of the Palestinian ranks". The use of weapons in internal disputes should be forbidden.

== Aftermath ==
The Palestinian legislative election took place on 25 January 2006, and resulted in a Hamas victory. Hamas leader Ismail Haniyeh formed a new PA government on 29 March 2006 comprising mostly Hamas members, after Fatah and other factions refused to join. Hamas continued not to recognize Israel and earlier agreements, leading to a substantial part of the international community, especially Israel, the United States and European countries, not to deal with the Hamas government and imposed sanctions. Following the abduction by Hamas militants of Gilad Shalit on 25 June 2006 in a cross-border raid via a tunnel out of Gaza, Israel detained nearly a quarter of PLC members and ministers on the West Bank during August 2006 and intensified the boycott of Gaza and other punitive measures. The Palestinian Prisoners' Document (also known as the Palestinian National Conciliation Document) dated 28 June 2006 urged the implementation of the Cairo Declaration.

Calls for the implementation of the Cairo Declaration, the formation of a unity government and the cessation of violence between Fatah and Hamas were made in the Fatah–Hamas Mecca Agreement of 8 February 2007. The Hamas government was replaced on 17 March 2007 by a national unity government headed by Haniyeh comprising Hamas and Fatah ministers.

In June 2007, after the Hamas takeover of Gaza, when Hamas fighters took control of the Gaza Strip and removed all Fatah officials, President Abbas, on 14 June, declared a state of emergency by Presidential decree, and dismissed Haniyeh's national unity government, and appointed an emergency government and suspended articles of the Basic Law, to circumvent the needed PNC approval.

President Abbas threatened on 18 July 2007 to cancel the Cairo Declaration, which would have had the effect of expelling Hamas and Islamic Jihad from the PLO. The PFLP and the DFLP urged Abbas not to annul the Declaration.

== See also ==
- Fatah–Hamas reconciliation process
- Palestinian Prisoners' Document
