= PJP =

PJP may refer to:

- People's Justice Party (UK), a former political party
- Palestinian Justice, a Palestinian political party
- Plastic Jet Printing, see Fused deposition modeling
- Pneumocystis jirovecii pneumonia, an opportunistic infection mainly affecting HIV positive persons
- .pjp, a file extension for JPEG
