= Gaza Community Mental Health Programme =

Organization based in Palestine

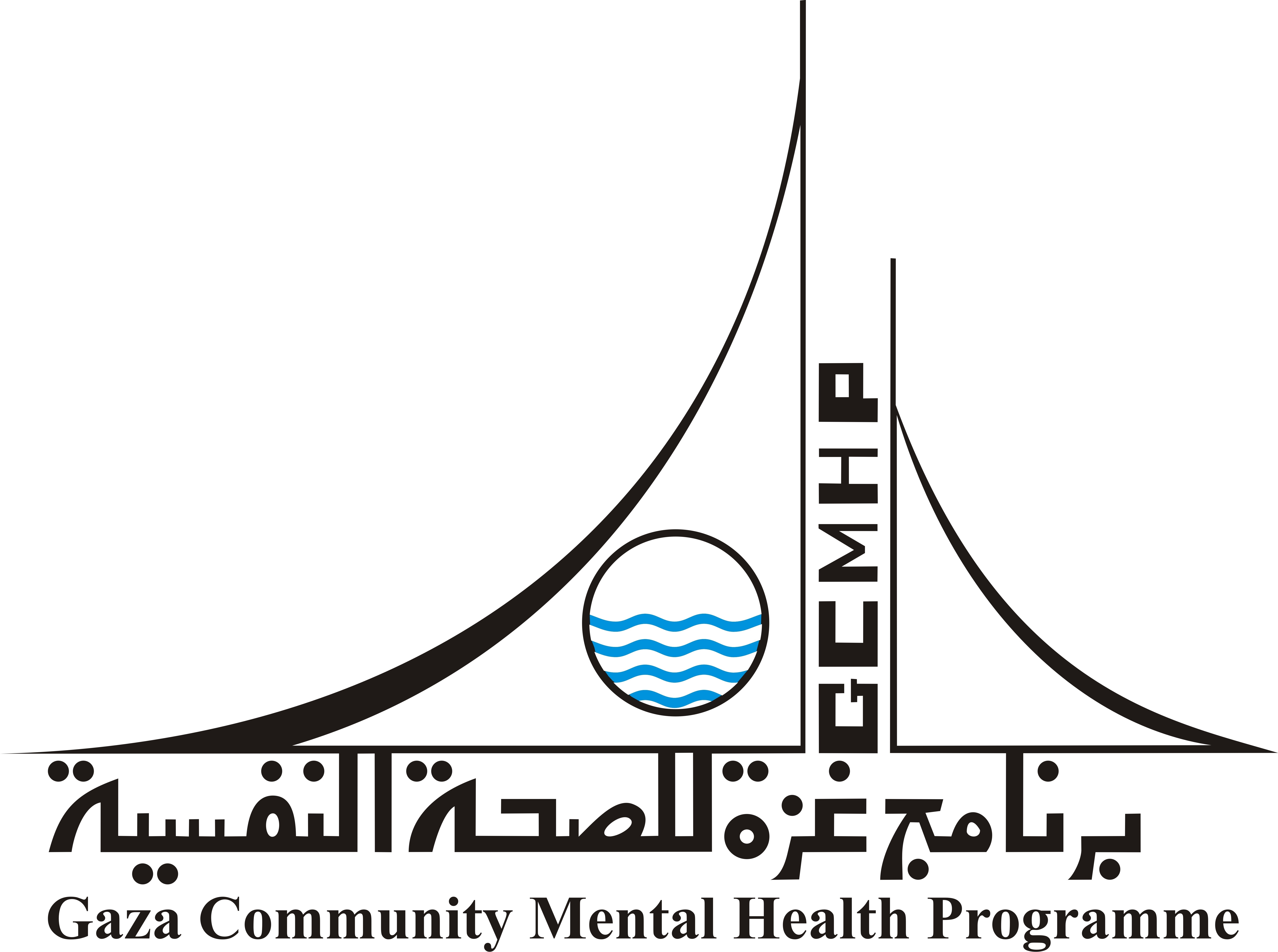
GCMHP logo

The Gaza Community Mental Health Programme (GCMHP; Arabic: برنامج غزة للصحة النفسية) is the leading Palestinian non-governmental organization which provides mental health services to the inhabitants of the Gaza Strip. The organization's stated purpose is committed to aid women, children, and victims of violence, torture, and human rights violations. The organization has over 135 employees, is involved with 18 international, regional and local coalitions and networks, and has treated over 20,000 clients.

GCMHP was founded in 1990 by Eyad al-Sarraj. The head office is located in the Sheikh Ejleen neighborhood, across from the Gaza Municipality Beach Club. In 2008, the premises were damaged by Israeli shelling of a nearby Palestinian police station, forcing GCMHP to relocate temporarily to the Gaza Community Center.

GCMHP's vision is to secure a Palestinian society that respects human rights and in which people are able to live in freedom and with dignity.

== Community mental health ==
GCMHP runs three community centers in Gaza City, Deir al-Balah and Khan Younis. The community centers offer psychotherapy for referred cases, rehabilitation, occupational therapy, EEG scans, physiotherapy, intelligence testing and crisis intervention.

GCMHP research has shown that Palestinian children have developed feelings of hostility, anger, fear and frustration which has led to an increase of violence among school students. In response to this, GCMHP has implemented a school mediation program which aims to reduce the level of violence and to educate children in peaceful conflict resolution techniques. The programme also trains school counselors, teachers and parents in mediation techniques.

GCMHP is active in the organization of psychosocially oriented summer camps for children, as well as recreational trips throughout the year.

GCMHP enables Palestinian patients to receive medical treatment abroad by coordinating with Israeli associations that work in the human rights field. The organization also offers free telephone counseling.

== Education ==
GCMHP offers a postgraduate diploma in Community Mental Health and Human Rights, as well as a diploma in Counseling and Psychological Support. Graduates of the diploma are equipped to facilitate the provision of mental health services in Gaza.

== Publications ==
In addition to a number of awareness-raising brochures and leaflets, GCMHP publishes a bimonthly magazine called 'Amwaj'. The magazine focuses on mental health issues and is distributed to local organizations in the Gaza strip.

== Research ==
The Research Department is the first specialized center for research and documentation in the field of mental health in the Gaza Strip. The department has conducted over 68 research studies examining trauma and a variety of psychosocial phenomena. Research papers published in international journals include "The Relations between Traumatic Experiences, Activity, and Cognitive and Emotional Responses Among Palestinian Children," "Relationships between Traumatic Events, Children's Gender, and Political Activity, and Perceptions of Parenting Styles," "Home Demolition and Mental Health: Victims and Witnesses," and "Mental Health of Palestinian Women."

== Funding ==
GCMHP is funded by a consortium of overseas donors including the Swiss Agency for Development and Cooperation, the Ministry of Foreign Affairs of the Netherlands, the Rehabilitation and Research Centre for Torture Victims – Denmark (RCT), and the Swedish International Development Cooperation Agency (SIDA). There are also a number of other non-consortium donors including the Gaza Mental Health Foundation, founded in the US in 2001 and Grassroots International (http://www.GrassrootsOnline.org), founded in 1983.
