= Palestinian Justice =

Palestinian political party

Palestinian Justice العدالة الفلسطينية
- Abbreviation: PJP
- Leader: Sameer Qadri
- Secretary: Tayseer Fattouh
- Founder: Usâma Salîm Muhammad
- Founded: February 2005
- Headquarters: Jenin, West Bank
- Membership (2005): 17,600
- Ideology: Palestinian nationalism North West Bank regionalism Two-state solution
- National affiliation: Palestine Liberation Organization
- Colors: Red; Green; Blue
- Slogan: Knowledge, Faith, Work, Reform (Arabic: علم إيمان عمل إصلاح)
- Legislative Council: 0 / 132

Website
- adalah.atspace.com

Palestinian Justice (Arabic: العدالة الفلسطينية, Al-Adala al-Filistiny), Palestinian Justice Party (PJP), or Justice for Palestine, is a Palestinian political party that took part in the 2006 Palestinian legislative election.

== History ==
The party was founded shortly before the 2006 Palestinian legislative election and was considered the newest party that participated in the election. It was founded by Usâma Salîm Muhammad in February 2005 in Jenin, a town in the northern part of the West Bank. Shortly after its foundation, in March 2005, the party claimed 17,600 members and asked to join the Palestine Liberation Organization. Palestinian Justice claimed to represent the interest of the northern West Bank and to have considerable strength there. It fielded 8 candidates in total, with its leader, Sameer Qadri, leading the electoral list of the party. The main slogan of the party was "liberty, justice and peace." The founder of the party, Usâma Salîm Muhammad, took 6th place on the list.

Reporting on the election, The Guardian considered the party a "say who?" contender who would have a marginal impact on Palestinian politics. The popularity of Palestinian Justice in the opinion polls varied considerably - in December 2005, the party polled 0.3% of the popular vote in the West Bank and 1.1% in Gaza Strip, for a total of 0.6% for the entire Palestinian area. Despite its claim to represent the Northern West Bank, most of its support came from the Gaza Strip - it polled 2% in the city of Khan Yunis. On the eve of the election, the party polled between 0.3% and 0.7%. However, it ultimately won 1723 votes, which amounted to 0.17%, falling below expectations and failing to win any seats.

The party remained active after the election, still reporting activity as of 2020. In 2022, the secretary of the party, Tayseer Fattouh, worked on a report for a political association Vision Centre, titled "Dismissal of Fatah Leaders: Implications and Repercussions".

== Ideology ==
The general slogan of the party is "Knowledge, Faith, Work, Reform". The banner and slogan of Palestinian Justice for the 2006 election was "liberty, justice and peace." It was described as a moderate party, and one that stood for the interests and regionalism of the northern West Bank. Political commentators regarded it as a part of the nationalist political camp, together with the National Coalition for Justice and Democracy and Third Way.

The main postulates of the party are:

- establishing an independent Palestinian state on the lands of West Bank and the Gaza Strip;
- recognizing Jerusalem as "the capital of the monotheistic religions" and "the capital of peace";
- non-violent resistance against Israel;
- establishing good relations with all other nations;
- forming a special relationship between Jordan and Palestine;
- adhering to the principles of humanitarian justice, international security and stability.

== Electoral performance ==
=== Legislative Council ===
Election	Votes	%	Seats	+/–	Position
2006	1,723	0.17	0 / 132	New	11th

== See also ==
- List of political parties in the Palestinian National Authority
- Palestinian Arab Front
- Palestinian Democratic Union
- Third Way
- National Coalition for Justice and Democracy
