= Rehabilitation and Research Centre for Torture Victims =

DIGNITY - Danish Institute Against Torture (formerly RCT short for Rehabilitation and Research Centre for Torture Victims) is a self-governing institution independent of party politics located in Denmark. The institution works to expose and document torture on a health professional basis, develop clinical diagnoses and treatment methods of torture survivors, educate in order to contribute to the global effort to abolish torture. DIGNITY's work has both Danish and international reach, mainly focussing on the prevention of torture and the rehabilitation of torture victims.

DIGNITY employs professionals from several fields such as medicine, economics, anthropology and others; it runs a clinical research centre, creates policies and accumulates information to provide knowledge on torture and change the practice in order to abolish torture. The institution works with the criminal justice system and local NGOs, monitoring places of detention and providing the NGOs with financial and technical resources.

== History ==
Rehabilitation and Research Centre for Torture Victims was formed on 30 October 1982, about a decade after the beginnings of the organised international anti-torture work. The founders were doctors who used the premises of the neurological department of the Copenhagen University Hospital to treat torture victims in 1980-1982. As the organisation grew, it built its own victim treatment centre, opened on 5 May 1984

RCT became the first anti-torture organisation that received government funding.

On 30 October 2012 RCT changed its name to DIGNITY - Danish Institute Against Torture.
