= R. Michael Alvarez =

American political scientist

Ramon Michael Alvarez (born 1964) is professor of political science at California Institute of Technology (Caltech), as well as the co-director of the Voting Technology Project, a joint Caltech-Massachusetts Institute of Technology initiative.

== Education ==
Alvarez received his B.A. magna cum laude from Carleton College in 1986, and his M.A. and Ph.D. from Duke University in 1990 and 1992, respectively, all in political science.

== Career ==
Alvarez served as a Robert S. Rankin Instructor of American Politics at Duke for one year (1991–92), after which he joined Caltech in 1992 as assistant professor of political science. In February 2002, he became a tenured full professor at Caltech.

== Honors and awards ==
In 2002, Alvarez received the Emerging Scholar Award from the American Political Science Association's Elections, Public Opinion, and Voting Behavior Section. In 2004, Alvarez was one of 50 recipients of the "Scientific American 50" award. He was named in the "50 Award" computing category, alongside Ted Selker. He was named a Fellow of the American Academy of Arts and Sciences in 2018.
