= Qais Abd al-Karim =

Palestinian politician

Palestinian Legislative Council
- Incumbent
- Assumed office 2006

Personal details
- Born: 1944 (age 81–82)
- Party: Democratic Front for the Liberation of Palestine
- Occupation: Activist
- Nicknames: Abu Layla; Qays Samarra’i

Qais Abd al-Karim (Arabic: قيس عبد الكريم), also known as Abu Layla or Qays Samarra’i, is a leading Palestinian activist of Iraqi origin.

He is a leader of the Democratic Front for the Liberation of Palestine, and a member of the Palestinian Legislative Council.

In 2006 he was one of two deputies elected from The Alternative (al-Badil) list, an alliance between the DFLP, the Palestinian People's Party and the Palestine Democratic Union (FIDA).
