= Third Way (Palestine) =

Third Way الطريق الثالث
- Leader: Salam Fayyad; Hanan Ashrawi
- Founded: 16 December 2005
- Ideology: Liberalism; Progressivism; Anti-corruption; Two-state solution
- Political position: Centre to left-wing
- Colours: Purple
- Legislative Council: 2 / 132

Website
- thirdway.ps (archived)

The Third Way (Arabic: الطريق الثالث aṭ-Ṭarīq ath-Thālith) is a liberal democratic Palestinian political party active in the Palestinian National Authority (PNA). Founded on 16 December 2005, the party was led by Salam Fayyad and Hanan Ashrawi. The party presents itself as an alternative to the two-party system of Hamas and Fatah.

In the January 2006 PLC elections the party received 2.41% of the popular vote and won two of the Council's 132 seats. After the disappointing election results, the party disappeared from the Palestinian arena, but in July 2015 party leaders held a series of meetings in Ramallah and Hebron to discuss the party's ability to reactivate its platform and return.

== History ==
The party was founded for the 2006 Palestinian legislative election and hoped to emerged from it as the third force in Palestinian politics. However, they severely underperformed, shocking political pundits - the party only won 2.41% of the popular vote and won four seats in total. This result was especially surprising given how the leaders of the party, Salam Fayyad and Hanan Ashrawi, played significant roles in Palestinian political life and were known to both Palestinian and Western audiences.

Fayyad served as a Country International Monetary Fund Director for more than 10 years, where Ashrawi was the spokesperson of the Palestine Liberation Organization during the Madrid peace conference, and participated in the Oslo Accords; apart from this, Ashrawi was also an established academic and political activist. Mustafa Barghouti, another leading member of the Third Way, was a former member of the Palestinian People's Party and the founding member of the Palestinian Medical Relief Committees.

Ultimately, the devastatingly weak result of the Third Way, despite featuring well-known political figures, was attributed to the fact that the impressive portofolio of the party's might have backfired. Barghouti, Ashrawi and Fayyad were discredited in the eyes of the Palestinian public for their willingness to participate in the Palestinian Authority, and their political opponents commonly attacked the party for its perceived elitism and overt support from Western donors. International observers also concluded that the extensive and highly visible Western support of the Third Way backfired and discredit the party's campaign, despite its political platform and the candidates' qualifications.

== Members ==
Party founder Salam Fayyad served as Finance Minister in the Palestinian Authority Government of February 2005, but resigned late 2005, to run for the 2006 elections. On 15 June 2007, Palestinian National Authority President Mahmoud Abbas named Salam Fayyad Prime Minister of the new emergency government, following Hamas' takeover of Gaza.

== Ideology ==
The party was described as left-wing and presented itself as liberal-democratic. Salam Fayyad, the leader of the party, described the party's ideology as one "with a democratic, social, liberal outlook". The Third Way called for a "radical reform" in all aspects of Palestinian administration and governance, describing the system as rife with corruption and otherwise dysfunctional. Fayyad particularly emphasized the need to reduce chaos and lawlessness in Palestine.

One of the main reforms presented by the party was its proposal to root out corruption, enforce the rule of the law and completely reform the justice system. Economically, the party focused on unemployment and poverty, and proposed establishing a welfare state and social security in the Palestinian state.

The Third Way argues against violent resistance to Israel, declaring its support for "popular and non-violent resistance" instead. According to Fayyad, Palestinians have every right to resist occupation and political repression, but only through "legitimate means". The party wants to restore the 1967 border with Israel and believes in finding a resolution to the issue of Palestinian refugees through negotiations with Israel and the United Nations.

== See also ==
- List of major liberal parties considered left
