= The Alternative (Palestine) =

The Alternative البديل
- Founded: 2006
- Dissolved: 2007
- Ideology: Communism; Secularism; Two-state solution
- Political position: Left-wing
- Palestinian Legislative Council (2006): 2 / 132

Election symbol
- ي

Website
- http://AlternativePalestine.com

The Alternative (Arabic: البديل al-badeel) or the Alternative List, was an electoral alliance of several socialist Palestinian groups:

- Democratic Front for the Liberation of Palestine (al-jabhah al-dīmūqrātiyyah li-tahrīr filastīn)
- Palestinian People's Party (hizb al-sha`b al-filastīnī)
- Palestine Democratic Union (al-ittihād al-dīmūqrātī al-filastīnī)
- Independents

In the January 2006 PLC elections it came fourth with 2.92% of the popular vote. It had two deputies elected: Qais Abd al-Karim and Bassam as-Salhi. Its best vote was in the Bethlehem Governorate, and its next best was in the Ramallah and al-Bireh Governorate.

The alliance was dissolved in early 2007.

== Ideology ==
The coalition was left-wing, as it was composed of three left-wing parties. The main points of its program was a pledge to immediately start negotiations with Israel over a permanent status of Palestine; it also stressed that it will insist on including the right to return of Palestinian refugees, and recovery of their lost houses and other property.

The Alternative focused on the poor, deprived and marginalized segments of the Palestinian society, and stressed the need to prioritise the reduction of poverty and unemployment in Palestine. Socially, it also called for full equality for women, pledging to abolish any legislation that would contradict this principle. Economically, the Alternative was considered communist, and was considered the ‘official communist’ list.

It strived to provide an alternative between Fatah and Hamas, arguing that the dominant position of both movements greatly harms political pluralism in Palestine. It described the choice between Fatah and Hamas as one between corruption and Islamic fundamentalism. It presented itself as "a democratic alternative to the present state of corruption and chaos" and aimed to become a coalition strong enough to act as an equilibrium between Hamas and Fatah.

The electoral goal of the party was to form a national coalition government between Hamas and Fatah, and to ensure that this government would be one that "fights corruption, brings down unemployment and relieves poverty." The Alternative called for a two-state solution based on 1967 borders. Regarding Palestinian resistance, it stated that it does not support "operations that target civilians and acts against innocent people", but that it "believes Palestinian resistance has the right to continue as long as the occupation continues."
