= Palestinian Arab Front =

Palestinian Arab Front الجبهة العربية الفلسطينية
- Leader: Jamil Shehadah
- Founded: 1993
- Split from: Arab Liberation Front
- Headquarters: Ramallah, Palestine
- Newspaper: Al-Jamahir; At-Tajdid
- Ideology: Palestinian nationalism Pan-Arabism; Socialism; Anti-Zionism; Arab nationalism
- Political position: Left-wing
- National affiliation: PLO

Palestinian Arab Front (Arabic: الجبهة العربية الفلسطينية Al-Jabhet Al-'Arabiya Al-Falestiniyeh, PAF) is a minor Palestinian Arab nationalist faction. PAF is a member of the Palestine Liberation Organization.

== History ==
The PAF has its roots in the Arab Liberation Front (ALF). This group had been created in 1968 by the Iraqi-based Ba'ath Party as its wing inside the Palestinian Fedayeen movement, and to serve as a counter-weight to the rivalling Syrian-based Ba'athist faction, al-Sa'iqa, within the PLO and Palestinian politics. The PAF itself was founded in 1993, after a split in the ALF. The split had been provoked by the decision of the ALF to freeze its PLO membership in protest of the Oslo Accords, as per Iraqi policy. The organization held its first conference inside Palestine on May 15-May 17, 1997, and eventually drifted closer to Fatah and the Palestinian National Authority, while the ALF remained staunchly loyal to Baghdad. The PAF, a very minor faction within PNA politics, has verbally supported the 2000 uprising against the Israeli regime's occupation, but it is unclear whether it performed any actual military activity.

The group supported the candidature of Mahmoud Abbas in the 2005 presidential elections.

PAF also took part in the 2006 legislative election with the list 'Freedom and Independence' (الحرية والاستقلال) in the national constituency. The list had 10 candidatures, 8 from the West Bank and 2 from Gaza. Two candidates were women. The list was headed by Salim al-Bardeni. In total the list got 4,398 votes (0.44%), which was far below the 2%-barrier to gain parliamentary representation. The group had one candidate in one of the provincial constituencies, Ishak Mahmoud Ishak Bahis in the Hebron Governorate. He got 3,446 votes.

== Policies ==
According to its own proclamations, PAF supports the right of Palestinian refugees "wishing to return to their homes [to] live at peace with their neighbours," in accordance with UN General Assembly Resolution 194; formation of an independent Palestinian state within the borders of 1967 with Jerusalem as its capital, releasing Palestinian hostages from the Israeli regime, dismantlement of the Israeli West Bank barrier; and evacuation of Israeli settlements from the West Bank.

Its long-term goals include Arab unity, political integration of the Arab nation of all current Arab states. It promotes strengthening of the Arab League and increased Arab economic cooperation. The front promotes increased cooperation amongst Muslim majority countries.

The front vows to fight against all forms of financial and administrative corruption and the elimination of favoritism. It claims to strive to increase participation of women in Palestinian society.

== Organization ==
The organization is led by a Central Committee and a Politburo. The General Secretary of the Front is Jameel Shihadeh ('Abu Khaled') and the Secretary of the Central Committee of Salim al-Bardeni, formerly the director of the Palestinian police. The group is a member of the Palestine Liberation Organization (PLO), and of the Palestinian National and Islamic Forces, which includes both PLO and non-PLO factions. It publishes the magazine Al-Jamahir (الجماهير, 'The Masses') and the bulletin At-Tajdid (التجديد, 'Renewal').

=== Mass organizations ===
PAF has a network of front organizations, including

- Palestinian Union of Students Struggle Committees (اتحاد لجان كفاح الطلبة الفلسطيني)
- Union of Teachers Struggle Committees (اتحاد لجان كفاح المعلمين)
- Society for the Promotion of the Family (جمعية النهوض بالاسرة)
- Settlement Committee (لجنة الاستيطان)
- Palestinian Union of Women's Struggle Committees (اتحاد لجان كفاح المرأة الفلسطيني)
- Palestinian Union of Workers Struggle Committees (اتحاد لجان كفاح العمال الفلسطيني)
- Al-Quds Charitable Society (جمعية القدس الخيرية)
- Land and Charity Society (جمعية البر والاحسان)
