= Politics of the Palestinian National Authority =

Politics of Palestine سياسة فلسطين
- Coat of arms of Palestine
- Polity type: Unitary semi-presidential republic
- Constitution: Basic Law of Palestine

Legislative branch
- Name: Palestinian Legislative Council
- Type: Unicameral
- Presiding officer: Aziz Dweik, Speaker of the Palestinian Legislative Council

Executive branch
- Head of state
- Title: President of Palestine
- Currently: Mahmoud Abbas
- Appointer: Direct popular vote
- Head of government
- Title: Prime Minister of Palestine
- Currently: Mohammad Mustafa
- Appointer: President of Palestine
- Cabinet
- Name: Cabinet of Palestine
- Current cabinet: Mustafa Government
- Leader: Prime Minister of Palestine
- Appointer: President of Palestine
- Ministries: 22

Judicial branch
- Name: Judiciary of Palestine
- Constitutional Court of Palestine
- Chief judge: Ali Muhanna
- Supreme Court of Palestine
- Chief judge: Muhammad Abdul-Ghani Al-Awiwi

The politics of the Palestinian National Authority (PNA) take place within the framework of a semi-presidential multi-party republic, with a legislative council, an executive president, and a prime minister leading the cabinet.

== Political developments since 1993 ==
In 1994, Israel and the Palestine Liberation Organization signed the Gaza–Jericho Agreement, which established the Palestinian National Authority, a governing body for the interim period pending final status negotiations.

== Executive branch ==
The President of the State of Palestine is the highest-ranking political position, the equivalent to head of state, in the Palestinian National Authority (PNA). The President is elected by popular elections. The last presidential election was the 2005 Palestinian presidential election.

The Prime Minister is appointed by the President and not directly elected by the Palestinian Legislative Council (parliament) or Palestinian voters. Unlike prime ministers in many other countries, the Palestinian Prime Minister does not serve as a member of the legislature while in office. Instead, the appointment is made independently by the ruling party. The Prime Minister is expected to represent the majority party or ruling coalition in the Legislative Council.

The leadership of the PNA has been disputed since the national unity government broke up on 14 June 2007 when President Abbas declared a state of emergency moved to dismiss Ismail Haniyeh as Prime Minister but he and the Legislative Council, which was controlled by Hamas, did not acknowledge the legitimacy of this step. Fighting between Fatah and Hamas has left the former in control of the West Bank and the latter in control of the Gaza Strip resulting in separate de facto leaderships in the territories both with dubious constitutional legitimacy. The situation was aggravated on 9 January 2009 when Abbas's term of office should have expired and Hamas appointed its own acting president in the form of Abdel Aziz Duwaik, who as the Speaker of the Palestinian Legislative Council can take over the post for 60 days under certain circumstances.

Main office-holders
Office	Name	Party	Since
President of the Palestinian National Authority	Mahmoud Abbas	Fatah	15 January 2005
Prime Minister of the Palestinian National Authority	Mohammad Mustafa	Fatah	14 March 2024

== Legislative branch ==
The legislature of the Palestinian Authority is the Palestinian Legislative Council, which is not to be confused with the Palestine National Council, which remains the national legislature of the Palestinian people as a whole. The PLC passed a new law in June 2005 to increase the number of members of the PLC from 88 to 132, half of which were to be elected under a system of proportional representation and half by traditional constituencies.

The first legislative elections under the new rules took place on 25 January 2006, which were decisively won by Hamas. There have not been legislative elections since.

== Administrative divisions ==
After the signing of the Oslo Accords, the West Bank and the Gaza Strip were divided into Areas A, B, and C, and 16 governorates, 11 in the West Bank and 5 in the Gaza Strip:

- In Area A, the PA has responsibility for civilian matters and control over security.
- In Area B, the PA has responsibility for civilian matters while Israel has control over security.
- In Area C, Israel has full control, including settlements.

Since June 2007, there have been two governments claiming to be the legitimate government of the Palestinian Authority, one based in the West Bank and the other based in the Gaza Strip.

=== Gaza Strip under Resolution 2803 ===
A peace plan agreed by both Hamas and the Israeli government in October 2025 includes provisions for a Board of Peace and National Committee for the Administration of Gaza to administer the Gaza Strip for a transitional period, before turning over administration to a reformed Palestinian Authority.

== International organization participation ==
UN (observer), OIC, AL, NAM, G-77 UNESCO

=== United Nations ===
The United Nations General Assembly recognized the PLO as the "representative of the Palestinian people" in Resolution 3210 and Resolution 3236, and granted the PLO observer status on 22 November 1974 in Resolution 3237. On 12 January 1976 the UN Security Council voted 11–1 with 3 abstentions to allow the Palestinian Liberation Organization to participate in a Security Council debate without voting rights, a privilege usually restricted to UN member states. It was admitted as a full member of the Asia group on 2 April 1986.

After the 1988 Palestinian Declaration of Independence, the PLO's representation was renamed Palestine. On 7 July 1998, this status was extended to allow participation in General Assembly debates, though not in voting.

By September 2012, with their application for full membership stalled due to the inability of Security Council members to 'make a unanimous recommendation', the Palestine Authority had decided to pursue an upgrade in status from "observer entity" to "non-member observer state". On 27 November it was announced that the appeal had been officially made, and would be put to a vote in the General Assembly on 29 November, where their status upgrade was expected to be supported by a majority of states. In addition to granting Palestine "non-member observer state status", the draft resolution "expresses the hope that the Security Council will consider favourably the application submitted on 23 September 2011 by the State of Palestine for admission to full membership in the United Nations, endorses the two state solution based on the pre-1967 borders, and stresses the need for an immediate resumption of negotiations between the two parties."

On Thursday, 29 November 2012, In a 138–9 vote (with 41 abstaining) UN General Assembly resolution 67/19 passed, upgrading Palestine to "non-member observer state" status in the United Nations. The new status equates Palestine's with that of the Holy See. The change in status was described by The Independent as "de facto recognition of the sovereign state of Palestine".

The vote was a historic benchmark for the sovereign State of Palestine and its citizens; it was a diplomatic setback for Israel and the United States. Status as an observer state in the UN will allow the State of Palestine to join treaties and specialised UN agencies, such as the International Civil Aviation Organisation, the Law of the Seas Treaty and the International Criminal Court. It shall permit Palestine to claim legal rights over its territorial waters and air space as a sovereign state recognised by the UN. It shall also provide the citizens of Palestine with the right to sue for control of the territory that is rightfully theirs in the International Court of Justice and with the legal right to bring war-crimes charges, mainly those relating to the illegal occupation of the State of Palestine, against Israel in the International Criminal Court.

The UN has permitted Palestine to title its representative office to the UN as "The Permanent Observer Mission of the State of Palestine to the United Nations". Palestine has started to retitle its name accordingly on postal stamps, official documents and passports; moreover, it has instructed its diplomats to officially represent "State of Palestine", as opposed to the "Palestine National Authority". Additionally, on 17 December 2012, UN Chief of Protocol Yeocheol Yoon decided that "the designation of 'State of Palestine' shall be used by the Secretariat in all official United Nations documents", thus recognising the PLO-proclaimed State of Palestine as being sovereign over the territories of Palestine and its citizens under international law.
