= List of members of the 2nd Palestinian Legislative Council =

Legislature of the Palestinian Authority elected in 2006

2nd Palestinian Legislative Council
| ← | 1st | TBD | → |

Overview
- Legislative body: Palestinian Legislative Council
- Meeting place: Ramallah
- Term: 25 January 2006 – 22 December 2018 (Note: Formally dissolved by President Mahmoud Abbas after a ruling from the Supreme Constitutional Court.)
- Election: 2006 Palestinian legislative election

Palestinian Legislative Council
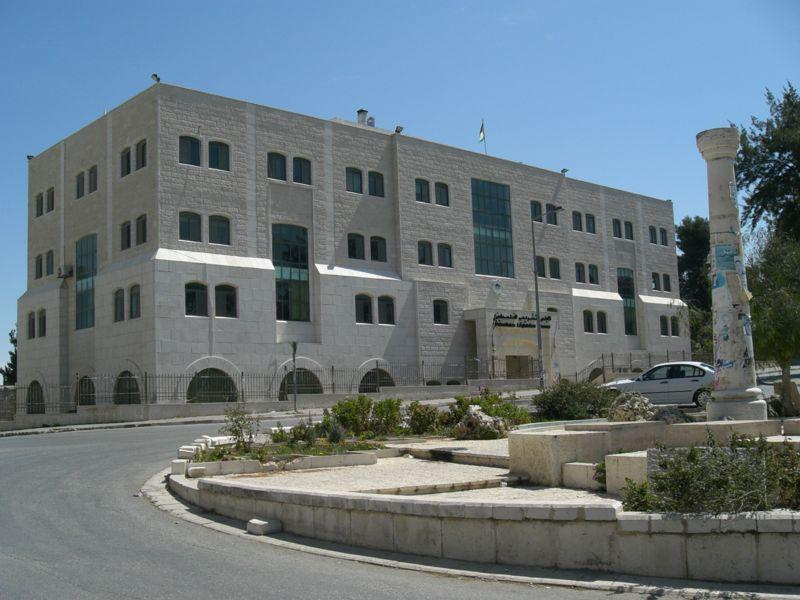
- Palestinian Legislative Council Building in Ramallah, West Bank (2007)
- Members: 132
- Speaker: Aziz Dweik
- First Deputy Speaker: Ahmad Bahar (Note: Died on 17 November 2023)
- Second Deputy Speaker: Hasan Khreisheh
- Prime Minister: Ismail Haniyeh (2006–2007); Salam Fayyad (2007–2013); Rami Hamdallah (2013–2019)
- Party control: Hamas

Sessions
- 1st: 18 February 2006 – Disputed (Note: The PLC did not have the necessary quorum to convene in full after the Hamas takeover of the Gaza Strip on 15 June 2007. As a result, no new session was commenced in accordance with the Council's procedures.)

The 2nd Palestinian Legislative Council (PLC) served as the legislature of the Palestinian Authority, established following the 2006 legislative election, in which 132 members were elected on 25 January 2006. The PLC was intended to operate for a four-year term, with its mandate set to conclude on 25 January 2010 as per the Basic Law.

The Council held its first meeting on 18 February 2006, where Aziz Dweik was elected as Speaker. However, it ceased to function in plenary sessions after the Hamas takeover of the Gaza Strip and the subsequent dismissal of the Hamas-led Second Haniyeh Government by the President of the Palestinian National Authority Mahmoud Abbas on 14 June 2007.

On 28 March 2006, the Palestinian Legislative Council held a vote of confidence for the First Haniyeh Government, led by Ismail Haniyeh of Hamas, following Hamas' victory in the 2006 election. After a year of political tensions and negotiations which led to the Fatah–Hamas Mecca Agreement, the Second Haniyeh Government, a National Unity Government, was approved by the PLC, though nearly one-third of its members were absent from the session. Following the dismissal of the cabinet by President Mahmoud Abbas, he appointed Third Way co-leader Salam Fayyad as Prime Minister. However, Fayyad's government was unable to secure a proper vote of confidence, as both Fatah and Hamas boycotted the parliamentary session in Ramallah on 22 June 2007. None of the subsequent governments received the required vote of confidence from the Palestinian Legislative Council, as mandated by the Basic Law, and were instead established through presidential decrees.

On 22 December 2018, the Palestinian Legislative Council was officially dissolved by Abbas, following a ruling by the Supreme Constitutional Court, which also called for elections for the 3rd PLC to be held within six months from the date of publishing the decision in the Official Gazette. However, Hamas, which has controlled the Gaza Strip since 2007, rejected the legitimacy of the dissolution, and no new elections have been held since.

The terms of all PLC members officially ended with the council's dissolution, but the legitimacy of this action remains contested due to the ongoing political division between the West Bank, governed by the Palestinian Authority, and the Gaza Strip, controlled by Hamas.

== Votes of confidence in the Council of Ministers ==
Vote of confidence Nomination of the First Haniyeh Government
| Ballot → | 28 March 2006 |
| Required majority → | 67 out of 132 |
| Yes: • Hamas (68); • Martyr Abu Ali Mustafa (3) | 71 / 132 |
| No: • Fatah (32); • Independent Palestine (2); • Third Way (2) | 36 / 132 |
| Abstentions | 2 / 132 |
| Absentees | 23 / 132 |

Vote of confidence Nomination of the Second Haniyeh Government
| Ballot → | 17 March 2007 |
| Required majority → | 67 out of 132 |
| Yes | 83 / 132 |
| No | 3 / 132 |
| Abstentions | 0 / 132 |
| Absentees | 41 / 132 |

== Bureau of the Council ==
According to Article 4 of the Bylaw of the Palestinian Legislative Council, the Bureau (also known as Office) consists of the Speaker, two Deputy-Speakers, and the Secretary-General, all of whom are elected by the Council through a secret ballot at the beginning of each session. The Bureau's term lasts until the opening day of the next regular session. If any position within the Bureau becomes vacant during this period, the Council holds an election to choose a successor.

Since plenary sessions of the full Palestinian Legislative Council have not been held since 2007, a new Bureau has not been lawfully elected in accordance with the Council's procedures. As a result, the Bureau elected in 2006 continues to consider itself as remaining in office.

| Leader | | Party | Term |
|---|---|---|---|
| Speaker | Aziz Dweik | Hamas | 18 February 2006 – present |
| First Deputy Speaker | Ahmad Bahar | Hamas | 18 February 2006 – 18 November 2023 |
| First Deputy Speaker | Vacant | – | 18 November 2023 – present |
| Second Deputy Speaker | Hasan Khreisheh | Independent | 18 February 2006 – present |
| Secretary-General | Ibrahim Shaker Khreisha | Fatah | 18 February 2006 – present |
Sources: PLC Bylaw of the PLC of 2003

== Composition ==
In the 2006 Palestinian legislative election, Fatah, under the leadership of President Mahmoud Abbas, lost 5 seats and its 10-year long status as the largest party in the PLC. Hamas formed a majority government led by Chairman Ismail Haniyeh, having won 74 seats under the Change and Reform list. Other parties, including the Palestinian National Initiative and Third Way, won seats in the Palestinian Legislative Council for the first time.

Composition of the Palestinian Legislative Council after the 2006 election

| Party | Bloc Leader (2006) | Living Members | | |
| Party | Bloc Leader (2006) | Elected in January 2006 | September 2026 (Note: This number accounts for members who are currently detained or imprisoned, even though they are not able to attend sessions.) | Change |
|---|---|---|---|---|
| Hamas | Ismail Haniyeh | 74 | 63 | ▼11 |
| Fatah | Azzam al-Ahmad | 45 | 39 | ▼6 |
| PFLP | Jamil Majdalawi; Khalida Jarrar | 3 | 3 | Steady |
| The Alternative | Qais Abd al-Karim; Bassam as-Salhi | 2 | 2 | Steady |
| PNI | Mustafa Barghouti | 2 | 1 | ▼1 |
| Third Way | Salam Fayyad; Hanan Ashrawi | 2 | 2 | Steady |
| Independent | – | 4 | 3 | ▼1 |
| Vacant | – | 0 | 19 | ▲19 |
| Total | – | 132 | 113 | ▼19 |

== List of members ==
This is a list of all 132 members of the Palestinian Legislative Council (PLC) originally elected in 2006, organized by electoral district. As of 31 December 2010, 16 members had been imprisoned by Israeli authorities. Currently, at least 15 members are reported to be deceased.

Original composition of the Palestinian Legislative Council by party list (left) and electoral district (right).

=== Members elected by plurality block voting ===
| Constituency | Member | | Party | Status |
| Constituency | Name in English | Name in Arabic | Party | Status |
|---|---|---|---|---|
| Bethlehem Governorate (4 seats) | Khaled Tafesh | خالد إبراهيم طافش ذويب | Hamas | Detained in Israel |
| Bethlehem Governorate (4 seats) | Mahmoud Al-Khatib | محمود داود محمود الخطيب | Hamas | |
| Bethlehem Governorate (4 seats) | Fuad Kokaly (Christian quota) | فؤاد كريم صليبا كوكالي | Fatah | |
| Bethlehem Governorate (4 seats) | Fayiz Al-Saqqa (Christian quota) | فايز أنطون إلياس السقا | Fatah | |
| Deir al-Balah Governorate (3 seats) | Abd al-Rahman al-Jamal | عبد الرحمن يوسف أحمد الجمل | Hamas | |
| Deir al-Balah Governorate (3 seats) | Ahmad Abu Holi | أحمد حسن عواد أبو هولي | Fatah | |
| Deir al-Balah Governorate (3 seats) | Salem Ahmed Abdel Hadi Salama | سالم أحمد عبد الهادي سلامة | Hamas | |
| Gaza City Governorate (8 seats) | ~~Said Seyam~~ | سعيد محمد شعبان صيام | ~~Hamas~~ | Assassinated by Israel in 2009 |
| Gaza City Governorate (8 seats) | ~~Ahmad Bahar~~ | أحمد محمد عطية بحر | ~~Hamas~~ | First Deputy Speaker; Assassinated by Israel in 2023 |
| Gaza City Governorate (8 seats) | Khalil al-Hayya | خليل إسماعيل إبراهيم الحية | Hamas | |
| Gaza City Governorate (8 seats) | ~~Muhammad Faraj al-Ghul~~ | محمد فرج محمود حسين الغول | ~~Hamas~~ | Assassinated by Israel in 2025 |
| Gaza City Governorate (8 seats) | Jamal Talab Mohammed Saleh | جمال طلب محمد صالح | Hamas | |
| Gaza City Governorate (8 seats) | Jamal al-Khudari | جمال ناجي شحادة الخضري | Independent | |
| Gaza City Governorate (8 seats) | Ziad Abu Amr | زياد محمود حسين أبو عمرو | Independent | |
| Gaza City Governorate (8 seats) | ~~Husam al-Tawil~~ (Christian quota) | حسام فؤاد كمال يعقوب الطويل | ~~Independent~~ | Deceased since 2012 |
| Hebron Governorate (9 seats) | Nayef Rajoub | نايف محمود محمد الرجوب | Hamas | |
| Hebron Governorate (9 seats) | Samir al-Kadi | سمير صالح إبراهيم القاضي | Hamas | |
| Hebron Governorate (9 seats) | Aziz Dweik | عزيز سالم مرتضى الدويك | Hamas | Speaker of the PLC |
| Hebron Governorate (9 seats) | Azzam Salhab | عزام نعمان عبد الرحمن سلهب | Hamas | Detained in Israel |
| Hebron Governorate (9 seats) | Muhammad Abu Jhesheh | محمد مطلق عبد المهدي أبو جحيشة | Hamas | |
| Hebron Governorate (9 seats) | Nizar Ramadan | نزار عبد العزيز عبد الحميد رمضان | Hamas | Detained in Israel |
| Hebron Governorate (9 seats) | Hatem Qafisha | حاتم رباح رشيد قفيشة | Hamas | |
| Hebron Governorate (9 seats) | Basim Za'rir | باسم أحمد موسى زعارير | Hamas | Detained in Israel |
| Hebron Governorate (9 seats) | Muhammad al-Til | محمد إسماعيل عثمان الطل | Hamas | Detained in Israel |
| North Gaza Governorate (5 seats) | Yusuf al-Shrafi | يوسف عواد يوسف الشرافي | Hamas | |
| North Gaza Governorate (5 seats) | Mushir al-Habil | مشير عمر خميس الحبل | Hamas | |
| North Gaza Governorate (5 seats) | Muhammad Abid Hadi Shihab | محمد عبد الهادي عبد الرحمن محمد شهاب | Hamas | |
| North Gaza Governorate (5 seats) | 'Atif 'Udwan | عاطف إبراهيم محمد عدوان | Hamas | |
| North Gaza Governorate (5 seats) | Ismail al-Ashqar | إسماعيل عبد اللطيف محمد الأشقر | Hamas | |
| Jenin Governorate (4 seats) | Khalid Yahya | خالد عبد عبد الله يحيى | Hamas | |
| Jenin Governorate (4 seats) | Azzam al-Ahmad | عزام نجيب مصطفى الأحمد | Fatah | Head of Fatah bloc |
| Jenin Governorate (4 seats) | Khalid Abu Hasan | خالد سليمان فايز أبو حسن | Hamas | |
| Jenin Governorate (4 seats) | Shami Shami | شامي يوسف محمد شامي | Fatah | |
| Jericho Governorate (1 seat) | ~~Saeb Erekat~~ | صائب محمد صالح عريقات | ~~Fatah~~ | Deceased since 2020 |
| Jerusalem Governorate (6 seats) | Ibrahim Abu Salim | إبراهيم سعيد حسن أبو سالم | Hamas | |
| Jerusalem Governorate (6 seats) | Muhammad Tutah | محمد عمران صالح طوطح | Hamas | Imprisoned in Jerusalem |
| Jerusalem Governorate (6 seats) | Wa'il al-Husayni | وائل محمد عبد الفتاح عبد الرحمن | Hamas | |
| Jerusalem Governorate (6 seats) | Ahmad Attun | أحمد محمد أحمد عطون | Hamas | Detained in Israel |
| Jerusalem Governorate (6 seats) | ~~Imil Jarjoui~~ (Christian quota) | إميل موسى باسيل جرجوعي | ~~Fatah~~ | Deceased since 2007 |
| Jerusalem Governorate (6 seats) | Ivivian Sabella (Christian quota) | إفيفيان زكريا عبد الله سابيلا | Fatah | |
| Khan Yunis Governorate (5 seats) | Muhammad Dahlan | محمد يوسف شاكر دحلان | Fatah | |
| Khan Yunis Governorate (5 seats) | Yunis Al Astal | يونس محيي الدين فايز الأسطل | Hamas | |
| Khan Yunis Governorate (5 seats) | ~~Salah al-Bardawil~~ | صلاح محمد إبراهيم البردويل | ~~Hamas~~ | Assassinated by Israel in 2025 |
| Khan Yunis Governorate (5 seats) | ~~Khamis Najjar~~ | خميس جودت خميس النجار | ~~Hamas~~ | Assassinated by Israel in 2023 |
| Khan Yunis Governorate (5 seats) | ~~Sufyan al-Agha~~ | سفيان عبد الله يوسف الأغا | ~~Fatah~~ | Deceased since 2007 |
| Nablus Governorate (6 seats) | Ahmad Ahmad | أحمد علي أحمد أحمد | Hamas | |
| Nablus Governorate (6 seats) | ~~Hamid Kdayr~~ | حامد سليمان جبر خضير | ~~Hamas~~ | Deceased since 2012 |
| Nablus Governorate (6 seats) | Mahmoud Aloul | محمود عثمان راغب العالول | Fatah | |
| Nablus Governorate (6 seats) | Riyad 'Amla | رياض علي مصطفى عملي | Hamas | |
| Nablus Governorate (6 seats) | Husni Burini Yasin | حسني محمد أحمد بوريني ياسين | Hamas | |
| Nablus Governorate (6 seats) | Dawud Abu Sayr | داود كمال داود أبو سير | Hamas | |
| Qalqilya Governorate (2 seats) | Walid Assaf | وليد محمود محمد عساف | Fatah | |
| Qalqilya Governorate (2 seats) | Ahmad Shraym | أحمد هزاع إبراهيم شريم | Fatah | |
| Rafah Governorate (3 seats) | Muhammad Hijazi | محمد سليمان موسى حجازي | Fatah | |
| Rafah Governorate (3 seats) | Ashraf Juma' | أشرف مصطفى محمد جمعة | Fatah | |
| Rafah Governorate (3 seats) | Radwan al-Akhras | رمضان سعيد سليمان الأخرس | Fatah | |
| Ramallah and al-Bireh Governorate (5 seats) | Hasan Dar Khalil | حسن يوسف داود دار خليل | Hamas | |
| Ramallah and al-Bireh Governorate (5 seats) | Fadil Fadil Hamdan | فضل محمد صالح حمدان | Hamas | Detained in Israel |
| Ramallah and al-Bireh Governorate (5 seats) | Ahmad Mubarak | أحمد عبد العزيز صالح مبارك | Fatah | Detained in Israel |
| Ramallah and al-Bireh Governorate (5 seats) | ~~Mahmud Muslih~~ | محمود إبراهيم محمود مصلح | ~~Hamas~~ | Deceased since 2022 |
| Ramallah and al-Bireh Governorate (5 seats) | Muhib Salame (Christian quota) | مهيب سلامة عبد الله سلامة | Fatah | |
| Salfit Governorate (1 seat) | Nasir 'Abd al-Jawwad | ناصر عبد الله عودة عبد الجواد | Hamas | |
| Tubas Governorate (1 seat) | Khalid Abu Tu'as | خالد حمد حامد أبو طوس | Hamas | |
| Tulkarm Governorate (3 seats) | Hasan 'Abd al-Fattah Khraysha | حسن عبد الفتاح عبد الحليم خريشي | Independent | Second Deputy Speaker |
| Tulkarm Governorate (3 seats) | Abdel Rahman Zeidan | عبد الرحمن فهمي عبد الرحمن زيدان | Hamas | Detained in Israel |
| Tulkarm Governorate (3 seats) | Riyad Raddad | رياض محمود سعيد رداد | Hamas | |

=== Members elected by party-list proportional representation ===
| No. | Member | | Party | Status |
| No. | Name in English | Name in Arabic | Party | Status |
|---|---|---|---|---|
| 1 | ~~Ismail Haniyeh~~ | إسماعيل عبد السلام أحمد هنية | ~~Hamas~~ | Assassinated by Israel in 2024 |
| 2 | Muhammad Abu Tir | محمد محمود حسن أبو طير | Hamas | Detained in Israel |
| 3 | ~~Jamila Abdallah Taha al-Shanti~~ | جميلة عبد الله طه الشنطي | ~~Hamas~~ | Deceased since 2023 |
| 4 | Muhammad Jamal Ala' al-Din | "محمد جمال" نعمان عمران علاء الدين | Hamas | |
| 5 | Yasir Da'ud Sulayman Mansur | ياسر داود سليمان منصور | Hamas | |
| 6 | Khalil Musa Khalil Raba'i | خلیل موسى خليل ربعي | Hamas | |
| 7 | Huda Na'im Muhammad Qrenawi | هدى نعيم محمد القریناوي | Hamas | |
| 8 | Mahmud Ahmad 'Abd al-Rahman Ramahi | محمود أحمد عبد الرحمن الرمحي | Hamas | |
| 9 | Mahmoud al-Zahar | محمود خالد الزهار الزهار | Hamas | |
| 10 | ~~Abdul Fatah Dukhan~~ | عبد الفتاح حسن عبد الرحمن دخان | ~~Hamas~~ | Deceased since 2023 |
| 11 | Ibrahim Muhammad Salih | إبراهیم محمد صالح دحبور | Hamas | |
| 12 | Miryam Mahmud Hasan Salih | مریم محمود حسن صالح | Hamas | |
| 13 | Fathi Muhammad Ali Qar'awi | فتحي محمد علي قرعاوي | Hamas | |
| 14 | Anwar Muhammad 'Abd al-Rahman al-Zbun | أنور محمد عبد الرحمن الزبون | Hamas | |
| 15 | Imad Mahmud Rajih Nufal | عماد محمود راجح نوفل | Hamas | |
| 16 | 'Umar Mahmud Matar Matar | عمر محمود مطر مطر (عبد الرازق) | Hamas | |
| 17 | Muna Salim Salih Mansur | منى سليم صالح منصور | Hamas | |
| 18 | Yahya 'Abd al-Aziz al-Abadsa | یحیى عبد العزيز محمد العبادسة | Hamas | |
| 19 | Muhammad Mahir Yusif Badr | "محمد ماهر" يوسف محمد بدر | Hamas | |
| 20 | Ayman Husayn Daraghmeh | أيمن حسين أمين دراغمة | Hamas | |
| 21 | Fathi Hamad | فتحي أحمد محمد حماد | Hamas | |
| 22 | ~~Umm Nidal~~ | مريم محمد يوسف فرحات | ~~Hamas~~ | Deceased since 2013 |
| 23 | Sayyid Salim Abu Musameh | سيد سالم السيد أبو مسامح | Hamas | |
| 24 | Marwan Muhammad Abu Ras | مروان محمد عايش أبو راس | Hamas | |
| 25 | Samira Abdullah Halaykah | سميرة عبد الله عبد الرحيم حلايقة | Hamas | |
| 26 | Jamal Ismail Iskaik | جمال إسماعيل هاشم سكيك | Hamas | |
| 27 | Ali Salim Romanin | علي سليم سلمان رومانين | Hamas | |
| 28 | Ahmad Yusuf Abu Halabiyya | أحمد يوسف أحمد أبو حلبية | Hamas | |
| 29 | 'Abd Al-Jabr Mustafa Fukaha | عبد الجابر مصطفى عبد الجابر فقهاء | Hamas | |
| No. | Member | | Party | Status |
| No. | Name in English | Name in Arabic | Party | Status |
| 1 | Marwan Barghouti | مروان حسيب حسين البرغوثي | Fatah | Detained in Israel |
| 2 | Muhammad Ibrahim Abu Ali Yata | محمد إبراهيم محمود أبو علي يطا | Fatah | |
| 3 | Intissar al-Wazir | انتصار مصطفى محمود الوزير | Fatah | |
| 4 | Nabil Shaath | نبيل علي رشيد شعث | Fatah | |
| 5 | ~~Hakam Balawi~~ | حكم عمر أسعد بلعاوي | ~~Fatah~~ | Deceased since 2020 |
| 6 | Abdullah Muhammad Ibrahim Abdullah | عبد االله محمد إبراهیم عبد االله | Fatah | |
| 7 | Najat 'Umar Sadiq Abu Bakir | نجاة عمر صادق أبو بكر | Fatah | |
| 8 | Raja'i Mahmud Sulieman Barakah | رجائي محمود سليمان بركة | Fatah | |
| 9 | Ibrahim Ali Ibrahim al-Masdar | إبراهيم علي إبراهيم المصدر | Fatah | |
| 10 | ~~Rabiha Diab Hussein Hamdan~~ | ربيحة ذياب حسين حمدان | ~~Fatah~~ | Deceased since 2016 |
| 11 | Muhammad Khalil Khalil al-Lahham | محمد خليل خليل اللحام | Fatah | |
| 12 | Jamal Muhammad Abu al-Rub | جمال محمد محمود أبو الرب | Fatah | |
| 13 | Sahar Fahad Da'ud al-Qawasmi | سحر فهد داود القواسمي | Fatah | |
| 14 | Majid Muhammad Abushammala | ماجد محمد أحمد أبو شمالة | Fatah | |
| 15 | Faysal Muhammad Ali Abu Shahla | فيصل محمد علي حسن أبو شهلا | Fatah | |
| 16 | Issa Ahmad 'Abd al-Hamid Qaraqi' | عيسى أحمد عبد الحميد قراقع | Fatah | |
| 17 | Siham Adil Yusif Thabit | سهام عادل يوسف ثابت | Fatah | |
| 18 | Nasir Jamil Muhammad Jum'a | ناصر جميل محمد خليل | Fatah | |
| 19 | Ala' al-Din Muhammad Yaghi | علاء الدين محمد عبد ربه ياغي | Fatah | |
| 20 | 'Abd al-Rahim Mahmud Burham | عبد الرحيم محمود عبد الرحيم برهام | Fatah | |
| 21 | Jamal 'Abd al-Hamid Muhammad al-Haj | جمال عبد الحميد محمد حاج | Fatah | Detained in Israel |
| 22 | Najat Ahmad Ali al-Astal | نجاة أحمد علي الأسطل | Fatah | |
| 23 | Jihad Muhammad Tamliya | جهاد محمد عبد الرحمن طملية | Fatah | |
| 24 | Jihad Awadallah Hamad Abu Znaid | جهاد عوض الله حمد أبو زنيد | Fatah | |
| 25 | ~~Akram Muhammad Ali al-Haymuni~~ | أكرم محمد علي الهيموني | ~~Fatah~~ | Deceased since 2009 |
| 26 | Jamal Mustafa Issa Hwail | جمال مصطفى عيسى حويل | Fatah | |
| 27 | Na'imah Muhammad Issa al-Shaykh Ali | نعيمة محمد محمد عيسى الشيخ علي | Fatah | |
| 28 | 'Abd al-Hamid Jum'a Yusif al-Ayla | عبد الحميد جمعة يوسف العيلة | Fatah | |
| No. | Member | | Party | Status |
| No. | Name in English | Name in Arabic | Party | Status |
| 1 | Ahmad Sa'adat | أحمد سعدات يوسف عبد الرسول | Martyr Abu Ali Mustafa | Detained in Israel since 2006 |
| 2 | Jamil Majdalawi | جميل محمد إسماعيل المجدلاوي | Martyr Abu Ali Mustafa | |
| 3 | Khalida Jarrar | خالدة كنعان محمد جرار | Martyr Abu Ali Mustafa | Detained in Israel since 2023 |
| No. | Member | | Party | Status |
| No. | Name in English | Name in Arabic | Party | Status |
| 1 | Qais Abd al-Karim | قيس كامل عبد الكريم خضر | The Alternative | |
| 2 | Bassam as-Salhi | بسام أحمد عمر الصالحي | The Alternative | |
| No. | Member | | Party | Status |
| No. | Name in English | Name in Arabic | Party | Status |
| 1 | Mustafa Barghouti | مصطفى كامل مصطفى البرغوثي | Independent Palestine | |
| 2 | ~~Rawya Shawa~~ | راوية رشاد سعيد الشوا | ~~Independent Palestine~~ | Deceased since 2017 |
| No. | Member | | Party | Status |
| No. | Name in English | Name in Arabic | Party | Status |
| 1 | Salam Fayyad | سلام خالد عبد الله فياض | Third Way | |
| 2 | Hanan Ashrawi | حنان داود خليل عشراوي | Third Way | |
