= Hikmat Zaid =

Palestinian politician (born 1945)

Minister of Transport and Communications
- In office 12 November 2003 – 24 February 2005
- President: Yasser Arafat; Rawhi Fattouh (acting); Mahmoud Abbas
- Prime Minister: Ahmed Qurei
- Preceded by: Abd al-Rahman Hamad
- Succeeded by: Saad al-Din Khurma

Minister of Agriculture
- In office 9 August 1998 – 13 June 2002
- President: Yasser Arafat
- Preceded by: Abd al-Gawad Saleh
- Succeeded by: Rafiq Al-Natsheh

Member of the Palestinian Legislative Council for Jenin Governorate
- In office 7 March 1996 – 18 February 2006

Governor of Jenin Governorate
- In office 1994 – 9 June 1996
- Preceded by: Office established
- Succeeded by: Zuhair Manasra

Palestinian Ambassador to Hungary
- In office 1985–1994
- President: Yasser Arafat
- Preceded by: Atef Abu Bakr
- Succeeded by: Khaled Ghazal

Palestinian Ambassador to Yemen
- In office 1979–1985
- President: Yasser Arafat

Personal details
- Born: Hikmat Hashim Lotfi Zaid Al-Kilani; 9 August 1945 (age 81) Silat al-Harithiya, Palestine
- Party: Fatah
- Spouse: Itidal (m. 1971)
- Children: 4
- Education: Alexandria University
- Occupation: Politician, diplomat, agronomist

Hikmat Hashim Lotfi Zaid Al-Kilani (Arabic: حكمت هاشم لطفي زيد الكيلاني, romanized: Ḥikmat Hāshim Luṭfī Zayd al-Kīlānī, born 9 August 1945), also known by his kunya Abu Zaid (Arabic: ابو زيد, romanized: Abū Zayd), is a Palestinian politician who served as the 2nd Minister of Agriculture from 1998 to 2002 in Yasser Arafat's third government and later as the 5th Minister of Transport and Communications from 2003 to 2005 in Ahmed Qurei's second government within the Palestinian National Authority.

From 1988 up until 2008, he was a member of the Fatah Revolutionary Council, where he previously served as the 1st Governor of Jenin from 1994 to 1996 and represented it as a member of the Palestinian Legislative Council from 1996 to 2006.

Zaid represented the Palestine Liberation Organization on an international level, serving as the Ambassador to Hungary from 1985 to 1994.

Zaid is currently a member of the Fatah Advisory Council and also served from 2006 to 2013 as a senior advisor to Mahmoud Abbas for Governorates affairs.

== Early life and education ==
Hikmat Zaid was born in Silat al-Harithiya, a village 10 kilometres northwest of Jenin in 1945. After graduation, he wasn't allowed to return to Palestine so he made Amman, Jordan his residence instead.

== Career ==
=== Early political career ===
In the early 1980s, Zaid was named PLO ambassador to Budapest, Hungary, where he tried to build ties with Hungary and other Eastern European countries and advocate for Palestinian rights.

Abu Zaid's early political career included key diplomatic duties with the Palestine Liberation Organization (PLO). Despite threats from the Abu Nidal Organization, a PLO splinter group who targeted moderate PLO and Fatah Revolutionary Council members like Hikmat and others for assassination, Zaid still carried on his mission.

Following the Oslo Peace Accords in 1993, Zaid returned to Palestine in 1994. He traveled to many Palestinian cities, including his hometown of Silat al-Harithiya near Jenin, to reunite with his people.

In 1994, after returning to Palestine from his diplomatic posts, Arafat, the President of the Palestinian National Authority, appointed him as the first Governor of Jenin since the Israeli occupation in 1967. He later ran successfully as an independent candidate for Jenin in the 1996 Palestine Legislative Council (PLC) elections on the Fatah list in which he received 14,220 votes. His leadership and reputation in Jenin were further enhanced catching the attention of then President of the Palestinian Authority Yasser Arafat who subsequently appointed him as the Minister of Agriculture in 1998 as part of his third government.

=== Minister of Agriculture ===
During his reign as the minister of agriculture, Abu Zaid imposed an embargo on a wide list of agricultural products from Israel in response to a 10-month blockade on Palestinian movement into Israel. According to him "This measure aims to denounce the destruction of Palestinian agriculture by Israel through the blockade of Palestinian territories. Bananas, mangoes, melons, pears, apples, poultry, eggs, cattle, and dairy goods, with the exception of milk, were among the items boycotted.

Zaid met his Israeli Agriculture Minister counterpart Shalom Simhon on 21 August to discuss the Palestinian Authority's ban on Israeli agricultural products. The ban was imposed due to Israeli military actions causing severe damage to Palestinian agriculture. Zaid indicated the ban could be lifted if the Israeli army allows free movement for Palestinian farmers and workers.

Zaid appealed to Arab agriculture ministers for help, noting the ministry's efforts since 1994 to rehabilitate the sector, which were undone by the conflict. He emphasized that these actions have increased unemployment and pushed over 50% of Palestinians below the poverty line.

=== Advisory role ===
Zaid ran unsuccessfully this time as under Fatah's banner as part of their Revolutionary Council for Jenin in the 2006 Palestinian Legislative Council (PLC) elections on the Fatah list in which he received 23,800 votes; lost by a 3250 margin.

Zaid was actively involved in political discussions with rival party Hamas after a year of gruesome fighting and tension in order to restore national Palestinian unity. Zaid headed an envoy whom were the first official Fatah delegation in over a year since the Fatah–Hamas conflict to visit the strip.

Zaid welcomed dialogue for efforts aimed at restoring Palestinian unity with senior Hamas delegation including Ahmed Yousef and Ghazi Hamad and Gaza Governor Muhammad al-Qudwa.

Zaid regularly visited and met with municipal councils asserting Abu Mazen's continued presidency until new elections are held. He also urged Hamas to engage in dialogue and commit to the Egyptian directive for legislative and presidential elections.

Zaid played a role in advocating for the Sixth Fatah General Assembly Conference.

Zaid highlighted challenges within Fatah, including internal conflicts, the participation of Gaza members, and the lack of time to resolve issues before the November 29 seventh conference. Zaid criticized inefficiencies in addressing organizational problems in both Gaza and the West Bank but noted that preparations for the conference continued to ensure broad representation of Fatah members.

== Outside of politics ==
=== PLO property dispute ===
Abu Zaid was mentioned in relation to facilitating the transfer of a PLO property in Musrara, Jerusalem. Reports indicate that Zaid instructed lawyer Fahmi Shabaneh not to intervene in the property's transfer, with the expectation that the property would be reclaimed when Jerusalem's status is resolved. Following these events, Shabaneh was suspended, and the property was transferred to the Universal Church. This incident has raised concerns about the management and protection of PLO assets amid ongoing political and legal complexities.

== Personal life ==
Hikmat married Itidal in 1971 and had four children with her. Hikmat and his family finally returned to Palestine following the Oslo Peace Accords between Israel and the PLO and in 1994 where he later on became the first Governor of Jenin. They have total of 14 grandchildren. Zaid suffered losses of two brothers in the late 1980s, and a third brother in 2024. Hikmat currently resides in Amman.

== See also ==
- List of Fatah members
- Politics of Palestine

Diplomatic posts
Preceded by –	Palestinian Ambassador to Yemen; 1979–1985	Succeeded by –
Preceded by Atef Abu Bakr	Palestinian Ambassador to Hungary; 1985–1994	Succeeded by Khaled Ghazal
Political offices
New office	Governor of Jenin Governorate; 1994–1996	Succeeded by Zuhair Manasra
New office	Member of the Palestine Legislative Council; 1996–2006	Succeeded by Azzam al-Ahmad
Preceded by Abdul Jawad Saleh	Minister of Agriculture; 1998–2002	Succeeded by Rafiq Al-Natsheh
Preceded by Abdulrahman Hamad	Minister of Transport and Communications; 2003–2005	Succeeded by Saadeddin Kharma
