= Leaders of Palestinian institutions =

The leaders of the Palestinian institutions are the leaders of the organs of the various Palestinian political entities: the Palestine Liberation Organization, the Palestinian National Authority, and the State of Palestine.

== Legislative ==
- Chairman of the Palestinian National Council for the Palestinian National Council and the Palestinian Central Council of the PLO and the State of Palestine – Salim Zanoun
- Speaker of the Palestinian Legislative Council for the Palestinian Legislative Council of the PNA – Aziz Dweik

== Executive ==
- Chairman of the Executive Committee of the Palestine Liberation Organization for the Executive Committee of the Palestine Liberation Organization and performing governmental functions for the State of Palestine – Mahmoud Abbas
- Prime Minister of the Palestinian National Authority – Mohammad Ibrahim Shtayyeh (West Bank) and Essam al-Da'alis (Gaza)

== Presidents ==
- President of the State of Palestine – Mahmoud Abbas
- President of the Palestinian National Authority – Mahmoud Abbas or Aziz Dweik

Sometimes both offices are held by the same person, or one or both of these is held by the same person who is also the Chairman of the Executive Committee of the Palestine Liberation Organization. The reference "President of Palestine" is utilized as short form for these positions.

period	Chairman of the Executive Committee of the Palestine Liberation Organization	President of the State of Palestine	President of the Palestinian National Authority
period	Chairman of the Executive Committee of the Palestine Liberation Organization	President of the State of Palestine	West Bank	Gaza Strip
10 June 1964 – 24 December 1967	Ahmad Shukeiri
24 December 1967 – 2 February 1969	Yahya Hammuda
2 February 1969 – 2 April 1989	Yasser Arafat
2 April 1989 – 5 July 1994	Yasser Arafat
5 July 1994 – 29 October 2004	Yasser Arafat
29 October 2004 – 11 November 2004	Mahmoud Abbas (on behalf of Yasser Arafat)	Yasser Arafat (incapacitated by illness)
11 November 2004 – 15 January 2005	Mahmoud Abbas	vacant	Rawhi Fattouh as Speaker of the PLC
15 January 2005 – 8 May 2005	Mahmoud Abbas	vacant	Mahmoud Abbas
8 May 2005 – 23 November 2008	Mahmoud Abbas	Mahmoud Abbas (on request of the PLO-EC)	Mahmoud Abbas
23 November 2008 – 15 January 2009	Mahmoud Abbas
15 January 2009 – 2 June 2014	Mahmoud Abbas		Mahmoud Abbas pending elections	Aziz Dweik as Speaker of the PLC
2 June 2014 – 17 October 2016	Mahmoud Abbas		Mahmoud Abbas pending elections
17 October 2016 – Present	Mahmoud Abbas		Mahmoud Abbas pending elections	Aziz Dweik as Speaker of the PLC

[acting] — [not applicable]
