= President of Palestine (disambiguation) =

President of Palestine may refer to:

- President of the State of Palestine (1989–present)
- President of the Palestinian National Authority (1994–2013)
