= Rafiq Al-Natsheh =

Speaker of the Palestinian Legislative Council (2003–2004)

Speaker of the Palestinian Legislative Council
- In office 3 November 2003 – 10 March 2004
- Preceded by: Ahmed Qurei
- Succeeded by: Rawhi Fattouh

Minister of Agriculture
- In office 13 June 2002 – 7 October 2003
- President: Yasser Arafat
- Prime Minister: Mahmoud Abbas
- Preceded by: Hikmat Zaid
- Succeeded by: Salam Fayyad

Minister of Labour
- In office 9 August 1998 – 13 June 2002
- President: Yasser Arafat
- Preceded by: Samir Ghawshah
- Succeeded by: Ghassan Khatib

Member of the Palestinian Legislative Council for Hebron Governorate
- In office 7 March 1996 – 18 February 2006

Palestinian Ambassador to Saudi Arabia
- In office 1979–1990
- President: Yasser Arafat
- Preceded by: Said Al Muzayin
- Succeeded by: Subhi Abu Karsh

Personal details
- Born: 1934 (age 91–92) Hebron, Palestine
- Party: Fatah
- Education: Lebanese University; Cairo University; Moscow State University
- Occupation: Politician

Rafiq Al-Natsheh (born 1934) is a Palestinian politician who served as the speaker of the Palestinian Legislative Council (PLC) from 3 November 2003 to 10 March 2004.

He has a political science degree from Cairo University. He is a member of Fatah, and was in its central committee. He became a member of the Palestinian National Council in 1964. He was the PLO representative in Saudi Arabia from 1979 to 1990. He was elected to the Palestinian Legislative Council in the 1996 elections. He was appointed as minister of labour of the Palestinian Authority from 1998 to 2002. He was appointed as minister of agriculture from 2002 until his election as speaker. He served as Speaker of the Palestinian Legislative Council from 3 November 2003 to 10 March 2004. Later he was appointed as the head of Palestinian Anti-Corruption Commission.

Diplomatic posts
Preceded by Said Al Muzayin	Palestinian Ambassador to Saudi Arabia; 1979–1990	Succeeded by Subhi Abu Karsh
Political offices
Preceded by Samir Ghawshah	Minister of Labour; 1998–2002	Succeeded by Ghassan Khatib
Preceded by Hikmat Zaid	Minister of Agriculture; 2002–2003	Succeeded by Salam Fayyad
Preceded by Ahmed Qurei	Speaker of the Palestinian Legislative Council; 2003–2004	Succeeded by Rawhi Fattouh
