= Abelhaleem Hasan Abdelraziq Ashqar =

Palestinian Muslim activist

- Born: Tulkarm, Palestine
- Occupation: Professor of Business
- Status: in prison
- Convictions: contempt and obstruction of justice (November 21, 2007)
- Penalty: 135 months

Abelhaleem Hasan Abdelraziq Ashqar (Arabic: عبد الحليم حسن عبد الرازق الأشقر) is a Palestinian Muslim activist who was an assistant professor of business at Howard University. He was convicted of criminal contempt and obstruction of justice for refusal to testify before a grand jury in a trial related to the funding of Hamas by donors in the United States, and was sentenced in November 2007 to 135 months in prison.

== Biography ==
Ashqar grew up in the West Bank town of Seida. In 1985 he began teaching business administration at the Islamic University of Gaza. He was the university's director of public relations and edited a university magazine. Several members of the faculty became leaders of Hamas, causing Israel to close the school.

In 1989 Ashqar came from Gaza to the United States on a Thomas Jefferson Fellowship funded by the United States Agency for International Development, and enrolled in the PhD program at the University of Mississippi. He earned his PhD in 1997. Ashqar's student visa expired in 1998 and he applied for political asylum arguing that he would be threatened by Israel should he return home. On the application he denied any affiliation with Hamas. He taught at Howard University for three years; it was a temporary position as assistant professor. The university did not renew the contract.

He moved to Northern Virginia in 1997. In 2004 Ashqar was living in Annandale, and/or in Alexandria, Virginia, and was a member of Virginia's Dar Al-Hijrah mosque and a member of the mosque's executive committee. He was on the Mosque's governing committee in 1998.

== Hunger strikes ==
In 1998 Ashqar was imprisoned by Judge Denise Cote of the United States District Court for the Southern District of New York for refusing to testify before a grand jury probing the involvement of Mousa Abu Marzook in funding Hamas. Ashqar, who was being defended by attorneys from the Center for Constitutional Rights, began a hunger strike in February 1998. In June he was taken to Westchester Medical Center and force-fed. He was released by the court in August. His weight dropped from 180 lbs to 120 lbs.

On 5 September 2003, Ashqar who was in a federal custody for refusing to testify before a grand jury in Chicago, started a second hunger strike. On 14 September he was transferred to a hospital, bound to a bed, and he received fluids via IV. Ashqar ended his hunger strike in November, and was subsequently released to house arrest.

== 2005 candidacy for Palestinian Authority Presidency ==
In 2005, while facing federal charges, Ashqar ran in the elections for the President of the Palestinian National Authority, running in absentia from his home in Virginia. The Australian Broadcasting Corporation described Ashqar as one of eight "long-shot" candidates in the 10 man race. Ashqar placed 4th, with 2.76% of the vote.

== Arrest and charges ==
Ashqar was arrested in 2004 on federal charges alleging that he was one of three people assisting in the recruitment and fund-raising efforts for Hamas in the United States over the course of 15 years. The arrest was regarded as part of a Bush administration effort to block funding for Hamas, which had been designated by the United States as a terrorist organization in 1995.

He is alleged to have organized meetings with Hamas activists in 1993 Philadelphia and in 1994 in Oxford, Mississippi where he was in graduate school.

Ashqar stood accused of acting as an archivist, collecting and archiving key documents on behalf of Hamas, and facilitating communication among Hamas operatives and members around the world. According to court documents, investigators discovered "a treasure trove of Hamas-related documents," at Ashqar's home, including details about recent Hamas attacks on Israeli soldiers, the minutes of confidential meetings of Hamas meetings; and a fax from Falls Church, Virginia businessman Mousa Abu Marzook, requesting that Ashqar arrange the transfer of $40,000 to a Palestinian activist. Marzook was deported from the United States in 1997.

Ashqar was accused of using his telephone to accept messages from Hamas agents, and pass them on to agents in other countries. In December 1993, an FBI wiretap documented Ashqar passing a message from a Hamas operative to a senior Hamas official in Syria, that called for Hamas to execute a rogue member. Some of this activity took place in 1992 and 1994, but Hamas was not declared a terrorist organization by the United States until 1995.

Ashqar admitted that he had transferred large sums of money to Hamas, but stated that the sums were intended to assist the Palestinian people, not to arm militants.

== Trial and conviction ==
At trial, Ashqar was given immunity. Nevertheless, he refused to testify. He was convicted of criminal contempt and obstruction of justice for his refusal to testify before a federal grand jury. According to The Washington Post, the case demonstrates the difficulty of convicting individuals who assist "radical Palestinian organizations", complicated, in this case, by the fact that Hamas was not officially defined as a terrorist organization until 1995. Although Ashqar was recorded discussing violent attacks, he had not been recorded directing violent attacks or recruiting agents to carry out violent attacks. Hamas leader Saleh al-Arouri was an unindicted co-conspirator, described in court documents as having been involved in Ashqar's transfers of money to allegedly benefit Hamas.

== Release and deportation ==
Ashqar was released from prison on June 13, 2017. He was immediately transferred into Immigrations and Customs Enforcement custody. In 2003, when a judge denied his asylum application, Ashqar agreed to leave for Jordan, from where he then planned to go to the United Arab Emirates where he had a job offer from a university. Before he could leave the country, he was subpoenaed. On the basis of the deportation order from 2003, Ashqar was held by ICE for 18 months, as Jordianian officals refused to accept him.

Federal officials aimed to deport Ashqar to Jordan, Israel, or the Palestinian Authority, while Ashqar argued in court that he feared he would be imprisoned and tortured in Israel, and that Jordan and the PA would hand him over to Israel. With negotiations ongoing between Ashqar and the US government, on June 4, 2019, Ashqar reported to a routine check-in at an ICE office in Fairfax, Virginia while on his way to celebrate Eid al-Fitr. ICE took him into custody and deported him to Israel. During the 11-hour flight to Tel Aviv, Judge T.S. Ellis III heard an appeal from Ashqar's attorneys and issued an order prohibiting his hand over to Israel. Ashqar and the agents accompanying him stayed in a jet for 28 hours before taking off to return to Manassas Regional Airport on June 6. Ashqar was released again on June 15.

== Sources ==
- Eggen, Dan, and Markon, Jerry, "Hamas Leader, 2 Others Indicted; Justice Dept. Targets U.S. Fundraising for Militant Group," The Washington Post, August 21, 2004; accessed December 7, 2009
- Murphy, Caryle, "Facing New Realities as Islamic Americans," The Washington Post, September 12, 2004, accessed November 6, 2009
- Sheridan, Mary Beth, "Palestinian Puzzle; A Business Professor in Springfield Goes on Trial Today On U.S. Charges of Supporting Hamas," The Washington Post, October 19, 2006, accessed November 7, 2009
- "Palestinian Activist Out of Jail After Ending Hunger Strike", Fox News, November 3, 2003, accessed December 7, 2009
- Eggen, Dan, and Markon, Jerry, "Hamas Leader, 2 Others Indicted; Justice Dept. Targets U.S. Fundraising for Militant Group," The Washington Post, August 21, 2004; accessed December 7, 2009
- Murphy, Carle, "Va. Man Certified as Candidate to Replace Arafat; Ashqar Joins Ballot Despite U.S. Charges, Confinement to Home", The Washington Post, December 3, 2004, accessed December 7, 2009
- US. v. Marzook, US District Court, N.D. Illinois, Eastern Division, November 17, 2005, accessed December 7, 2009
- Bush, Rudolph, and Coen, Jeff, "Hamas-aid case draws split verdict", LA Times, February 2, 2007, accessed December 7, 2009
- "Transcript of Sentencing Proceedings," US v. Ashqar, November 21, 2007, accessed December 7, 2009
- U.S. v. Ashqar, US Court of Appeals for the Seventh Circuit, October 2, 2009, accessed December 7, 2009
