= Sufian (name) =

Sufian is a Malay variant of the Arabic name, Sufyan.

Notable people with the given name include:

- Sufian Abu Zaida (born 1960), Palestinian politician
- Sufian Allaw (born 1944), Syrian former politician
- Sufian Anuar (born 1987), Singaporean footballer
- Sufian Sabtu, Bruneian politician and civil servant
- Sufian Suhaimi (born 1992), Malaysian singer
- Sufian Sultan (born 1948), Palestinian agricultural engineer and cabinet member
- Sufian Tayeh (1971–2023), Palestinian scientist
