= Palestinian Anti-Corruption Commission =

Government agency of Palestine

State of Palestine Palestinian Anti-Corruption Commission
- هيئة مكافحة الفساد الفلسطينية

Agency overview
- Headquarters: Ramallah
- Agency executives: Ahmed Barak, President
- Website: www.pacc.ps

The Palestinian Anti-Corruption Commission (Arabic: هيئة مكافحة الفساد الفلسطينية, romanized: Hayʼat Mukāfaḥat al-Fasād al-Filasṭīnīyah) is a governmental body that enjoys legal personality and financial and administrative independence. It was established in 2005 under the name of the Anti-Graft Commission, but in 2010 it changed its name to the Anti-Corruption Commission. On January 8, 2005, Rawhi Fattouh, President of the Interim Palestinian National Authority, issued the Anti-Corruption Law.

== Entities subject to the authority ==
The law of the Palestinian Anti-Corruption Commission issued in 2005, and amended in 2018, specified the entities that are subject to the commission, namely:

1. The head of state, his advisers, and the heads of the institutions affiliated with the presidency.
2. Chairman and members of the Council of Ministers, and the like.
3. Speaker and members of the Legislative Council.
4. Members of the judiciary and the public prosecution.
5. Heads of civil and military institutions, bodies, and bodies, and members of their boards of directors, if any.

Governors, chairmen, and members of local councils, and their employees.

1. Public employees appointed by a decision of a competent authority to occupy a position included in the system of civil or military job formations on the budget of a government department, whatever the nature or title of that position, members of the diplomatic corps, and the like.
2. Chairmen and members of the boards of directors of companies, and workers in them, to which the state or any of its institutions is a shareholder.
3. Shareholders and employees of non-profit companies.

Arbitrators, experts, judicial guards, creditors' agents and liquidators.

1. Chairmen and members of the boards of directors of charitable societies and international cooperation that enjoy an independent legal personality, financial and administrative independence, parties, unions, federations and clubs, and the like, and those working in any of them, even if they are not invited from the general budget.
2. Persons in charge of public service in relation to the work assigned to them.
3. Any non-Palestinian person holding a position in any of the state, executive, and judicial institutions, and any person exercising a public function in favor of any public body, public facility, or civil organization of a foreign country or institution of an international character.
4. Officials and members of the bodies to which the state contributes or submits its budgets, or any support from the state's general budget, and those working in it.

== Presidents of the body ==
The Anti-Corruption Commission Act, in 2005, defined a non-renewable term of seven years. In 2017, President of the State of Palestine Mahmoud Abbas issued a decree of Law No. (4) of 2017 and provides for:

Article No. (6) of the original law, which is a new paragraph, is amended to read as follows: 4. Notwithstanding what is stated in the first paragraph of this article, you may extend the president of the state with an extension of the head of the commission for an additional period of up to two years.

- The head of the commission during the period from inception in 2005 until March 9, 2010, is unknown.
- Rafik El-Natsheh took over the presidency of the Anti-Corruption Commission on March 9, 2010, and his mandate was renewed in 2017 for only one year, and in 2018 his mandate was renewed for only one year. In March 2019, his term expired.
- Ahmed Barak, assumed the presidency of the Anti-Corruption Commission on March 13, 2019.
