= Seida, Tulkarm =

Seida صيدا
- Municipality type D (Village council)
- Location of Seida within Palestine
- Coordinates: 32°23′06″N 35°07′07″E
- Palestine grid: 161/199
- State: State of Palestine
- Governorate: Tulkarm

Government
  - Type: Village council

Population (2017)
  - Total: 3,777
- Name meaning: Saida, personal name, from "hunting"

Seida (Arabic: صيدا) is a Palestinian town in the Tulkarm Governorate of the State of Palestine, in the eastern West Bank, located 20 kilometers northeast of Tulkarm. According to the Palestinian Central Bureau of Statistics, Seida had a population of 3,777 in 2017.

== History ==
Ceramics from the Iron Age II, Hellenistic, early and late Roman, Byzantine, early Muslim and the Middle Ages have been found here.

In 1179, during the Crusader era, it appeared as an estate, sold to the Zion Monastery in Jerusalem.

In 1265, following his victory over the Crusaders, Sultan Baibars granted Seida to his followers. The entire village was assigned to Emir Husam al-Din Itamish b. Utlis Khan.

=== Ottoman era ===
In 1517, Seida, like all of Palestine, was incorporated into the Ottoman Empire. In the 1596 tax registers, it was part of the nahiya ("subdistrict") of Jabal Sami, part of the larger Sanjak of Nablus. It had a population of 70 households and 2 bachelors, all Muslims. The inhabitants paid a fixed tax rate of 33,3% on agricultural products, including wheat, barley, summer crops, olive trees, goats and beehives, in addition to occasional revenues and a fixed tax for people of Nablus area; a total of 12,160 akçe. All of the revenue went to a Waqf.

In 1870/1871 (1288 AH), an Ottoman census listed the village in the nahiya (sub-district) of al-Sha'rawiyya al-Sharqiyya.

In the 1882 PEF's Survey of Western Palestine (SWP), Saida is described as: "a small village, with a well on the east on the back of a long and bare ridge."

=== British Mandate era ===
In the 1922 census of Palestine conducted by the British Mandate authorities, Saida had a population of 252 Muslims, increasing in the 1931 census to 351 Muslims, living in 75 houses.

In the 1945 statistics the population of Seida was 450 Muslims, with 5,060 dunams of land according to an official land and population survey. Of this, 1,622 dunams were plantations and irrigable land, 1,113 were used for cereals, while 11 dunams were built-up (urban) land.

=== Jordanian era ===
In the wake of the 1948 Arab–Israeli War, and after the 1949 Armistice Agreements, Seida came under Jordanian rule.

In 1961, the population was 808.

=== Post 1967 ===
Since the Six-Day War in 1967, Seida has been under Israeli occupation.

== Notable people ==
- Abelhaleem Hasan Abdelraziq Ashqar

== Bibliography ==
- Barron, J.B., ed. (1923). Palestine: Report and General Abstracts of the Census of 1922. Government of Palestine.
- Conder, C.R.; Kitchener, H.H. (1882). The Survey of Western Palestine: Memoirs of the Topography, Orography, Hydrography, and Archaeology. Vol. 2. London: Committee of the Palestine Exploration Fund.
- Government of Jordan, Department of Statistics (1964). First Census of Population and Housing. Volume I: Final Tables; General Characteristics of the Population (PDF).
- Government of Palestine, Department of Statistics (1945). Village Statistics, April, 1945.
- Hadawi, S. (1970). Village Statistics of 1945: A Classification of Land and Area ownership in Palestine. Palestine Liberation Organization Research Center.
- Hütteroth, W.-D.; Abdulfattah, K. (1977). Historical Geography of Palestine, Transjordan and Southern Syria in the Late 16th Century. Erlanger Geographische Arbeiten, Sonderband 5. Erlangen, Germany: Vorstand der Fränkischen Geographischen Gesellschaft. ISBN 3-920405-41-2.
- Ibn al-Furat (1971). J. Riley-Smith (ed.). Ayyubids, Mamluks and Crusaders: Selections from the "Tarikh Al-duwal Wal-muluk" of Ibn Al-Furat : the Text, the Translation. Vol. 2. Translation by Malcolm Cameron Lyons, Ursula Lyons. Cambridge: W. Heffer.
- Mills, E., ed. (1932). Census of Palestine 1931. Population of Villages, Towns and Administrative Areas. Jerusalem: Government of Palestine.
- Palmer, E.H. (1881). The Survey of Western Palestine: Arabic and English Name Lists Collected During the Survey by Lieutenants Conder and Kitchener, R. E. Transliterated and Explained by E.H. Palmer. Committee of the Palestine Exploration Fund.
- Zertal, A. (2016). The Manasseh Hill Country Survey. Vol. 3. Boston: BRILL. ISBN 978-9004312302.
