= 2005 Palestinian presidential election =

General election held in the Palestinian National Authority

- 9 January 2005
- Turnout: 73.42% (▲1.76 pp)
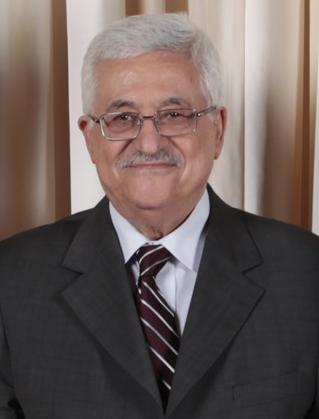

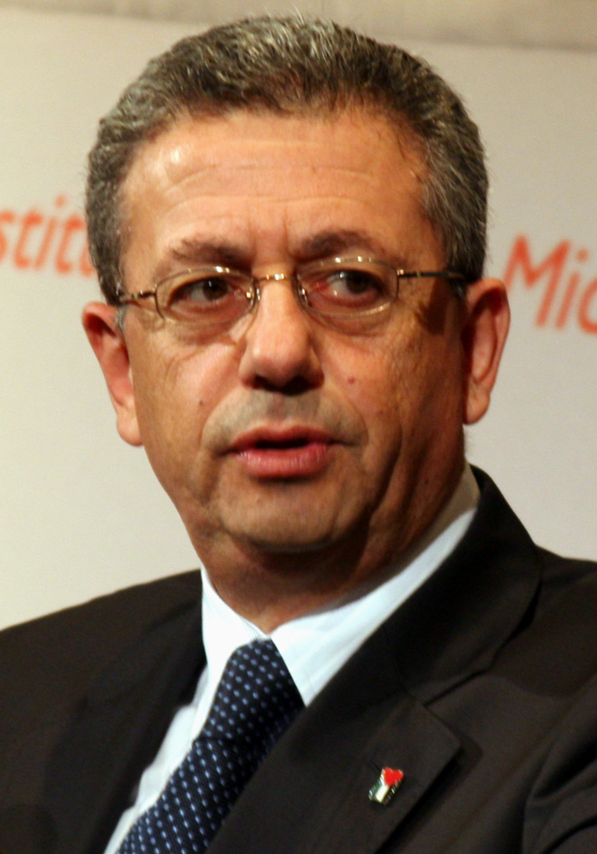
Nominee	Mahmoud Abbas	Mustafa Barghouti
Party	Fatah	PNI
Popular vote	501,448	156,227
Percentage	67.38%	20.99%
- Results by governorate: Mahmoud Abbas: 50–55% 55–60% 60–65% 65–70% 70–75%
President before election
Rawhi Fattouh
Fatah
Elected President
Mahmoud Abbas
Fatah

The 2005 Palestinian Presidential elections were held in the West Bank and Gaza Strip of the Palestinian National Authority on Sunday, 9 January 2005 to elect the President of the Palestinian National Authority, to succeed Yasser Arafat, who had died on 11 November 2004. The election was the first to be held since the 1996 general election, and voters elected Palestine Liberation Organization chairman Mahmoud Abbas for a four-year term.

Seven candidates contested the election. Abbas won over 67% of the votes cast, independent candidate Mustafa Barghouti came second with 21%, and the remaining candidates were far behind. The election was boycotted by Hamas and Islamic Jihad. Hamas urged supporters to stay away, but did not try to disrupt the election. In the Gaza Strip, where Hamas is strongest, it is estimated that about half of the eligible voters voted.

No presidential elections have taken place since 2005. Abbas has continued in office since the expiration of the four-year term on 9 January 2009, with planned elections repeatedly postponed.

== Candidates ==
On 25 November 2004, Fatah's Revolutionary Council endorsed Mahmoud Abbas as its preferred candidate for the presidential election, scheduled for 9 January 2005, despite his relative lack of popular appeal. Abbas was a former PA Prime Minister.

Marwan Barghouti, a member of the Palestinian Legislative Council and Fatah leader in the West Bank, who was in an Israeli prison after being convicted for a number of intifada killings, suggested that he might run, inspiring considerable speculation about his prospects. He was seen as the only candidate who could hope to compete seriously against Abbas. However, his proposed candidacy met with resistance from Fatah activists. After contradictory announcements, Marwan Barghouti declared his candidacy just before the registration deadline expired but then withdrew from the race on 12 December, after discussions between his representatives and the Fatah leadership. Opinion polls before Marwan Barghouti withdrew his candidacy suggested that the contest would largely be between Abbas and Marwan Barghouti. Some of these polls showed:

- Abbas 44% / Marwan Barghouti 46% (±3%) (Development Studies Program, Bir Zeit University)
- Abbas 40% / Marwan Barghouti 38% (±3%) (Palestinian Center for Policy and Survey Research)
- Abbas 40% / Marwan Barghouti 22% (±3%) (Palestinian Center for Public Opinion).

With Marwan Barghouti's withdrawal, Abbas was seen as the clear favourite, with Marwan Barghouti‘s cousin Mustafa Barghouti in second place.

=== Final list of candidates ===
- Mahmoud Abbas - Palestine Liberation Organisation. Former Prime Minister and current chairman of the PLO, endorsed by the Fatah Revolutionary Council on November 25, 2004.
- Abelhaleem Hasan Abdelraziq Ashqar - independent.
- Sayyid Barakah - independent.
- Mustafa Barghouti - independent. A democracy activist and head of the Palestinian National Initiative. His candidacy was supported by the Popular Front for the Liberation of Palestine. Not to be confused with his cousin Marwan Barghouti.
- Taysir Khalid - Democratic Front for the Liberation of Palestine
- Bassam al-Salhi - Palestinian People's Party
- Abdel Karim Shubeir - independent

Three other candidates who registered by the end of the registration period subsequently withdrew: they were Marwan Barghouti, Hassan Khreisheh and Abd al-Sattar Qasim.

== Registration ==
=== Preparation of voting register ===
The CEC had made enormous efforts to register all eligible Palestinian voters, but almost a third of eligible voters did not register or were unable to register. Problems were due to a not up to date civil registry and the translation of Arabic names, which were in Hebrew on Israeli ID cards. In an effort to boost low turnout, the CEC made a controversial decision in the final hours of polling day to allow unregistered voters to cast ballots using only their identity cards, which raised fears of multiple voting. A Palestinian election official, speaking on condition of anonymity, told the Associated Press that the changes came after heavy pressure from Mahmoud Abbas' Fatah movement, which feared a low turnout could weaken Abbas. ("Abbas Wins Palestinian Vote in Landslide," Associated Press, 10 January 2005).

The day before the election the total number of registered voters was 1,092,407 according to a CEC press release. On 23 November, the CEC said: "The number of registrants on the voters’ list reached 1,111,868, or 67 percent of the estimated number of eligible voters, during the registration process conducted between September 4 and October 13, 2004. Of these names, 19,000 were removed from the voters’ list because the accompanying data was incomplete or the names were repeated on the list. With this adjustment, the number of registered voters decreased to 1,092,856." ("46% of Registered Voters are Youths, 46% are Women.")

=== Palestinian diaspora ===
According to UNRWA, there were 2.6 million Palestinians registered as refugees with the agency eligible to receive services who lived outside Palestine, in Jordan, Lebanon and Syria. An unknown additional number sometimes estimated to be up to one million live in the diaspora in Europe, North and South America and in other Arab countries.

== Conduct ==
The election was conducted by the Palestinian Central Elections Commission (CEC), which was also responsible for the preparation of an electoral register. The head of the CEC was Hanna Nasir, who was appointed in 2002 by Yasser Arafat. The CEC was established by the Palestinian Authority in 1995 as an independent body.

The CEC experienced some technical problems, including those due to the incomplete electoral register. Persons not listed on the electoral register were permitted to vote on presentation of a valid identity card. In view of the registration problems, in an effort to boost low turnout, in the final hours of polling day the CEC was controversially instructed to extend voting by two hours beyond the appointed closing time to allow unregistered voters to cast ballots using only their identity cards. The decision raised fears of multiple voting.

The election was observed by a number of international observers, including former President Jimmy Carter and U.S. Senators Joe Biden and John E. Sununu.

=== Obstruction by Israel claimed by CEC ===
The election campaign faced problems due to the widespread blockade of the Palestinian territories by the Israel Defense Forces. Despite Israel's assurances that it would do what it could to ensure that the election took place, in many instances Israeli forces actively interfered in the campaign. Among reported incidents was the arrest of Mustafa Barghouti by Israeli forces and his subsequent expulsion from East Jerusalem when he was going to hold an election speech there. He was also prevented from entering Nablus and Gaza. Bassam al-Salhi, candidate for the socialist Palestinian People's Party, was also prevented from visiting East Jerusalem. Many of Abbas' opponents claimed that they were unfairly treated as Israel denied them entry to areas Abbas was allowed to visit during the election campaign. Abbas was the only candidate allowed access to Gaza.

Voter registration was hampered by closure of registration centers due to curfews, roadblocks and road closures. Registration staff and supervisors were detained. Israeli troops, used gas grenades and noise in the vicinity. The CEC claimed a number of centers were raided.

Particularly East Jerusalem was affected. According to the CEC, checking of the names of voters in the voters list was prevented. Also the polling was supervised by the Israeli postal authority. The votes were not counted at the polling centers themselves, but first transported to the Jerusalem electoral constituency office in Dahiyat al-Barid. The CEC also said that voters were intimidated by recording the ID card numbers that were listed in the register and registration staff members were detained.

The CEC said there were difficulties in accessing polling stations. In Khan Younis Israeli soldiers opened fire against a school used as a polling station and by roadblocks prevented thousands of people from getting to the polling stations.

The European Union's foreign policy chief Javier Solana criticized Israel for insufficiently easing restrictions and was quoted as saying that "Israel did not fulfill its commitment as it should have."

== Results ==
Mahmoud Abbas won the election with 67.4% of valid votes cast; 62.5% when invalid and blank votes are included.

Candidate	Party	Votes	%
Mahmoud Abbas	Fatah	501,448	67.38
Mustafa Barghouti	Palestinian National Initiative	156,227	20.99
Taysir Khalid	Democratic Front for the Liberation of Palestine	26,848	3.61
Abelhaleem Hasan Abdelraziq Ashqar	Independent	22,171	2.98
Bassam as-Salhi	Palestinian People's Party	21,429	2.88
Sayyid Barakah	Independent	10,406	1.40
Abdel Karim Shubeir	Independent	5,717	0.77
Total		744,246	100.00
Valid votes		744,246	92.79
Invalid/blank votes		57,831	7.21
Total votes		802,077	100.00
Registered voters/turnout		1,092,407	73.42
Source: CEC, IFES

== Results by governorate ==
These totals, documenting the results in each of the 16 governorates of Palestine, also tabulate blank and invalid votes.

Governorate	Mahmoud Abbas Fatah		Mustafa Barghouti Independent		Taysir Khalid DFLP		Abelhaleem Hasan Abdelraziq Ashqar Independent		Bassam as-Salhi PPP		Sayyid Barakah Independent		Abdel Karim Shubeir Independent		Invalid votes		Blank votes		Total votes
Governorate	#	%	#	%	#	%	#	%	#	%	#	%	#	%	#	%	#	%	Total votes
Quds	17,356	61.68	5,350	19.07	1,666	5.94	559	1.99	580	2.07	188	0.67	86	0.31	950	3.39	1,324	4.72	28,059
Jenin	41,663	62.26	12,065	18.03	4,029	6.02	1,427	2.13	1,865	2.79	513	0.77	181	0.27	2,765	4.13	2,410	3.60	66,918
Tulkarm	26,288	54.88	9,327	19.47	2,791	5.83	2,658	5.55	2,925	6.11	169	0.35	144	0.30	1,786	3.73	1,815	3.79	47,903
Tubas	10,324	67.50	2,389	15.62	933	6.10	257	1.68	157	1.03	66	0.43	52	0.34	510	3.33	607	3.97	26,188
Nablus	53,048	59.30	19,408	21.70	4,368	4.88	2,193	2.45	3,349	3.74	414	0.46	251	0.28	3,234	3.62	3,192	3.57	89,457
Qalqilya	14,187	63.57	4,496	20.15	655	2.94	347	1.55	559	2.50	144	0.65	51	0.23	904	4.05	973	4.36	22,316
Salfit	10,584	55.70	3,940	20.73	933	4.91	398	2.09	1,751	9.21	65	0.34	56	0.29	676	3.56	599	3.15	19,002
Ramallah	41,552	58.98	15,767	22.38	2,152	3.05	2,543	3.61	3,566	5.06	279	0.40	224	0.32	1,889	2.68	2,484	3.53	70,456
Jericho	8,698	74.89	1,603	13.80	205	1.76	109	0.94	338	2.91	38	0.33	15	0.13	275	2.37	334	2.88	11,615
Bethlehem	29,406	61.07	9,896	20.55	1,895	3.94	878	1.82	1,675	3.48	188	0.39	120	0.25	1,766	3.67	2,329	4.84	48,153
Hebron	59,912	60.65	23,004	23.29	2,579	2.61	1,914	1.94	2,274	2.30	653	0.66	298	0.30	3,909	3.96	4,236	4.29	98,779
North Gaza	36,550	67.62	10,670	19.74	825	1.53	1,826	3.38	495	0.92	432	0.80	594	1.10	1,603	2.97	1,061	1.96	54,056
Gaza	62,113	68.52	14,461	15.95	1,500	1.65	3,431	3.78	540	0.60	828	0.91	2,143	2.36	3,488	3.85	2,147	2.37	90,651
Deir al-Balah	28,944	66.44	7,803	17.91	653	1.50	1,272	2.92	550	1.26	939	2.16	384	0.88	1,832	4.21	1,190	2.73	43,657
Khan Yunis	37,733	62.01	10,255	16.85	992	1.63	1,208	1.99	348	0.57	5,014	8.24	830	1.36	2,980	4.90	1,488	2.45	60,848
Rafah	23,090	65.97	5,793	16.55	672	1.92	1,151	3.29	457	1.31	476	1.36	288	0.82	2,105	6.01	970	2.77	35,002
Total	501,448	62.52	156,227	19.48	26,848	3.35	22,171	2.76	21,429	2.67	10,406	1.30	5,717	0.71	30,672	3.82	27,159	3.39	802,077

== International response ==
The EU praised the election, with European Commission president José Manuel Durão Barroso describing it as "a very important step towards the creation of a viable and democratic Palestinian state".
