= Ahmad Bahar (Palestinian politician) =

Palestinian politician (1949–2023)

- أحمد بحر

First Deputy Speaker of the Palestinian Legislative Council
- In office 18 February 2006 – 17 November 2023
- Speaker: Aziz Dweik
- Succeeded by: Vacant

Member of the Palestinian Legislative Council
- In office 18 February 2006 – 17 November 2023

Personal details
- Born: 1949 Gaza City, All-Palestine Protectorate
- Died: 17 November 2023 (aged 74) Gaza City, Palestine
- Party: Hamas
- Children: 13
- Education: Islamic University of Gaza
- Occupation: Politician

Ahmad Mohammad Bahar (Arabic: أحمد بحر; 1949 – 17 November 2023) was a Palestinian politician who served as the first deputy speaker of the Palestinian Legislative Council (PLC) since his election to that post on 18 February 2006. Born in Gaza City, Palestine, he was a professor at the Islamic University of Gaza.

In 2012, he delivered a televised sermon in which he prayed for Allah to kill "the Jews and their supporters... [and] the Americans and their supporters... without leaving a single one". This statement has been characterized as incitement to genocide.

During the Gaza war he was fatally injured by an Israeli airstrike. He died from his wounds on 17 November 2023 at the age of 74.

== See also ==
- Aziz Dweik – Speaker of the Palestinian Legislative Council since 2006
- Khalil al-Hayya – Palestinian politician (born 1960)

Political offices
Preceded by –	First Deputy Speaker of the Palestinian Legislative Council; 2006–2023	Vacant
