= Qadoura Mousa =

Palestinian governor

Governor of Jenin Governorate
- In office 2002 – 2 May 2012
- Preceded by: Zuhair Manasra
- Succeeded by: Talal Dweikat

Director of Fatah movement for the northern West Bank
- In office May 2002 – 2 May 2012

Personal details
- Born: Jenin, West Bank
- Died: 2 May 2012 Jenin, West Bank
- Party: Fatah
- Occupation: Politician

Qadoura Mousa (Arabic: قدوره موسى), also written as Kadoura, was the governor of the Jenin Governorate of the Palestinian National Authority in the northern West Bank.

== International profile ==
Qadoura Mousa was described as the director of Yasser Arafat's Fatah movement for the northern West Bank in May 2002. He is credited with issuing the official death toll, 56 Palestinians, for the Battle of Jenin. Palestinian spokespeople outside the camp had earlier estimated the number as around 500 and official Israeli spokespeople with access to the camp announced it was between 150 and 250.

== Death ==
Around 11.30 p.m.1 May 2012, unknown assailants opened fire on Mousa's home in Jenin, police spokesman Mujahid Rabiya said. The governor left his home with security chiefs to check-up on the security situation in the city, when he suffered the heart attack that killed him, presidential office chairman Hussein al-Araj told official PA news agency Wafa. He arrived at Jenin government hospital in the early hours of 2 May 2012 suffering heart pains, and died in intensive care, the hospital said. Thousands from different cities in the West Bank attended his funeral.
