= Hatem Qafisha =

Palestinian politician (born 1963)

- حاتم قفيشة

Member of the Palestinian Legislative Council
- Incumbent
- Assumed office 18 February 2006
- Constituency: Hebron Governorate

Personal details
- Born: 1963 (age 62–63)
- Party: Hamas

Hatem Qafisha (Arabic: حاتم قفيشة; born 1963) is a Palestinian politician. He is a current member of the Palestinian Legislative Council (PLC) representing Hebron Governorate. He is affiliated with the Hamas movement.

== Biography ==
Qafisha was one of over 400 Hamas activists deported by Israel to Southern Lebanon in December 1992 for his membership in the organization. When he returned to the West Bank in 1993, he recorded his time in exile in a series of articles in the Al-Quds newspaper. He intended to publish a memoir, but Israeli prison guards confiscated his writings.

He campaigned for a seat in the PLC from his prison cell and was elected in January 2006. On November 6, 2007, the Israel Defense Forces (IDF) seized Qafisha from his home in Hebron as a part of series of arrests of Hamas members following the capturing of Israeli soldier Gilad Shalit by Palestinian militants. He was held in administrative detention in the Ketziot prison in the Negev Desert until his release on November 1, 2009. While in prison, Qafisha reportedly completed a PhD through correspondence courses. As a PLC member, he is working to promote sporting activities in the West Bank which includes plans to renovate the Hussein Stadium in Hebron. These plans have been put on hold since his imprisonment.

On 26 July 2020, IDF arrested Qafisha from his home in the city of Hebron.
