= Khaled Tafesh =

Palestinian politician

Khaled Tafesh is a Hamas politician and member of the 2nd Palestinian Legislative Council representing Bethlehem. He was detained by Israel in 2012. He was detained again in 2020.
