= Taysir Khalid =

Palestinian politician

Member of the Politburo of the Democratic Front for the Liberation of Palestine

Member of the Executive Committee of the Palestine Liberation Organization

Personal details
- Born: Qaryut, Mandatory Palestine
- Political party: Democratic Front for the Liberation of Palestine
- Children: Fabian, Murad, Nadia, Nadeen, grandsons Omar and Rami

Taysir Khalid (Arabic: تيسير خالد), also spelled as Tayseer Khaled, is a member and politburo, member of the Democratic Front for the Liberation of Palestine (DFLP), and a former member of the Executive Committee of the Palestine Liberation Organization. He resigned in protest against the Oslo Accords in 1993. He was the party's candidate for the Palestinian presidential election in 2005. He gained 3.4% of the vote.

Khalid was born on 19 January 1941 in Qaryut, Mandatory Palestine, near Qabalan and as-Sawiya. His father Ahmad was a peasant who had four sons, Abbas, Jameel, Tareq and Taysir. He also had three sisters, Yosra, Myassar, and Nawal, who now lives in Amman/Zarqa, Jordan, two sons, Fabian and Murad and two daughters, Nadia and Nadeen, two grandsons Omar and Rami.
