= Samira Abdullah Halaykah =

Palestinian politician

Samira Abdullah Halaykah is a Palestinian politician from Hamas and member of the 2nd Palestinian Legislative Council. She is from the Change and Reform bloc of Hamas. In 2008, the Palestinian Authority, raided her office. She was detained by Israel in 2017.
