= Sufian Sultan =

Palestinian agricultural engineer and cabinet member

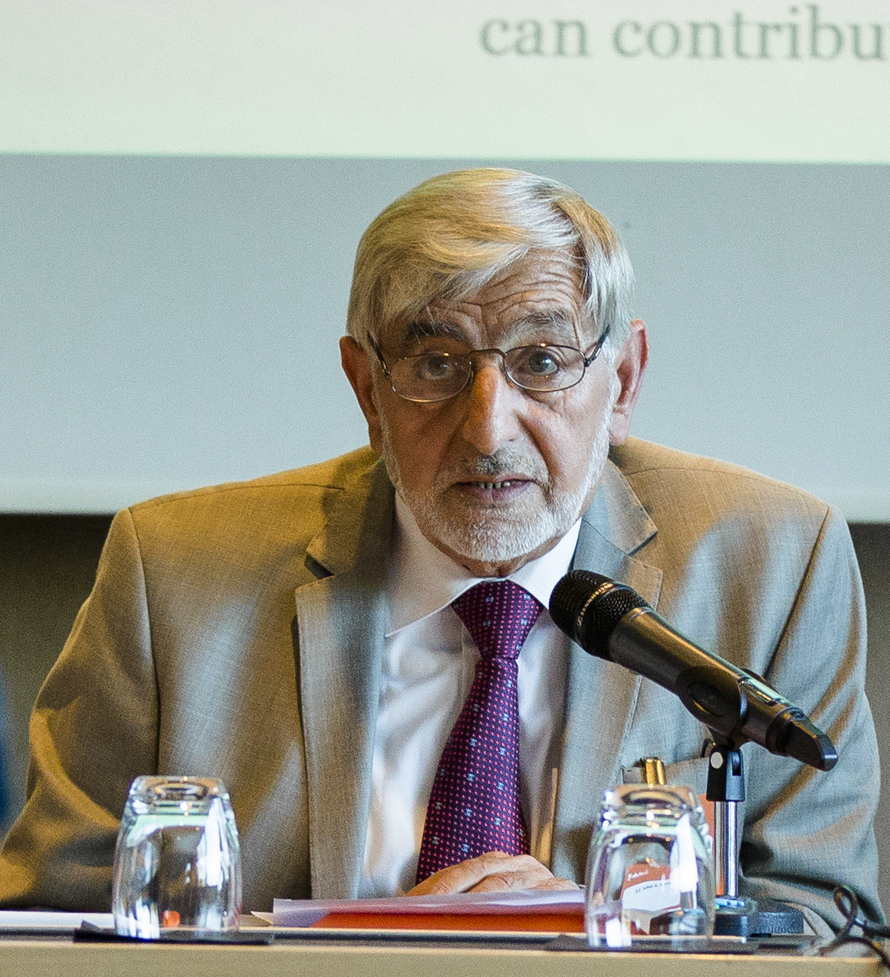

Minister of Agriculture
- In office 31 July 2015 – 13 April 2019
- President: Mahmoud Abbas
- Prime Minister: Rami Hamdallah
- Preceded by: Walid Assaf
- Succeeded by: Riyad al-Atari

Personal details
- Born: 7 February 1948 (age 78) Hebron, Mandatory Palestine
- Profession: Agricultural engineer, lecturer

Sufian Sultan (Arabic: سفيان سلطان; born 7 February 1948 in Hebron) is an agricultural engineer and a Palestinian lecturer who holds a PhD in Agricultural Engineering. He served as Minister of Agriculture in the 17th Palestinian Government from 31 July 2015 until 13 April 2019.
