= Ministry of Agriculture (Palestine) =

Government ministry of Palestine

- وزارة الزراعة

Agency overview
- Formed: 1948 (first form); 1996 (second form)
- Jurisdiction: Government of Palestine
- Headquarters: Ramallah, Palestine
- Agency executive: Rizk Salimiyah, Minister of Agriculture
- Website: www.moa.pna.ps

The Ministry of Agriculture is responsible for the development and implementation of agricultural policies and programs in Palestine. Its main goal is to promote sustainable agricultural practices, increase productivity, and ensure food security in the country. Rizk Salimiyah is the current minister of agriculture.

== Overview ==
The Ministry of Agriculture works towards achieving these goals by providing technical assistance and support to farmers, promoting research and development in the agriculture sector, and implementing programs that address the needs of rural communities.

Some of the key areas of focus for the Ministry of Agriculture in Palestine include:

- Sustainable agriculture: The Ministry aims to promote sustainable farming practices that are environmentally friendly and socially responsible. This includes promoting the use of organic farming methods, reducing the use of pesticides and fertilizers, and promoting crop diversification.
- Food security: Ensuring that all Palestinians have access to adequate and nutritious food is a top priority for the Ministry. This includes supporting small-scale farmers, promoting local food production, and improving the distribution and accessibility of food in the country.
- Rural development: The Ministry works to promote the development of rural areas in Palestine by providing support for small-scale farmers and promoting the creation of agricultural cooperatives. It also works to improve access to infrastructure and basic services in rural communities.
- Research and development: The Ministry supports research and development in the agriculture sector in order to improve crop yields, develop new technologies and practices, and promote innovation in the industry.

== List of ministers ==
All-Palestine Government

#	Name	Party	Government	Term start	Term end	Notes
1	Amin Aqel	Independent	All-Palestine	22 September 1948	1949	

Government of Palestine

#	Name	Party	Government	Term start	Term end	Notes
1	Abd al-Gawad Saleh	Independent	2	17 May 1996	9 August 1998	
2	Hikmat Zaid	Fatah	3	9 August 1998	13 June 2002	
3	Rafiq Al-Natsheh	Fatah	4, 5, 6	13 June 2002	7 October 2003	
4	Salam Fayyad	Independent	7	7 October 2003	12 November 2003	
5	Rawhi Fattouh	Fatah	8	12 November 2003	1 June 2004	
6	Ibrahim Abu al-Naga	Fatah	8	1 June 2004	24 February 2005	
7	Walid Abd Rabbo	Fatah	9	24 February 2005	29 March 2006	
8	Mohammed al-Agha	Hamas	10, 11	29 March 2006	14 June 2007	
9	Mahmoud al-Habbash	Independent	12	14 June 2007	19 May 2009	
10	Ismail Duaiq	Independent	13	19 May 2009	28 August 2011	
11	Ahmed Majdalani	Palestinian Popular; Struggle Front	13	28 August 2011	16 May 2012	
12	Walid Assaf	Fatah	14, 15, 16	16 May 2012	2 June 2014	
13	Shawqi Al-Issa	Independent	17	2 June 2014	31 July 2015	
14	Sufian Sultan	Independent	17	31 July 2015	13 April 2019	
15	Riad Attari	Independent	18	13 April 2019	31 March 2024	
16	Rizk Salimiyah	Independent	19	31 March 2024	Incumbent	
