= Zuhair Manasra =

Palestinian politician (1943–2025)

- زهير المناصرة

Governor of Bethlehem
- In office 17 July 2003 – 20 November 2005
- Preceded by: Mohammed Al-Madani
- Succeeded by: Salah Tamari

Governor of Jenin
- In office 9 June 1996 – 3 July 2002
- Preceded by: Hikmat Zaid
- Succeeded by: Qadoura Mousa

Personal details
- Born: 9 April 1943 Hebron, Mandatory Palestine
- Died: 4 October 2025 (aged 82)
- Party: Fatah
- Education: Goethe University Frankfurt (MA)
- Occupation: Economist

Zuhair Manasra (Arabic: زهير المناصرة; 9 April 1943 – 4 October 2025) was a Palestinian politician. A member of Fatah, he served as governor of Jenin from 1996 to 2002 and of Bethlehem from 2003 to 2005.

Manasra died on 4 October 2025, at the age of 82.
