= Chairman of the Palestine Liberation Organization =

Leader of the Executive Committee of the Palestine Liberation Organization

Chairman of the Executive Committee of the Palestine Liberation Organization
- رئيس اللجنة التنفيذية لمنظمة التحرير الفلسطينية (Arabic)
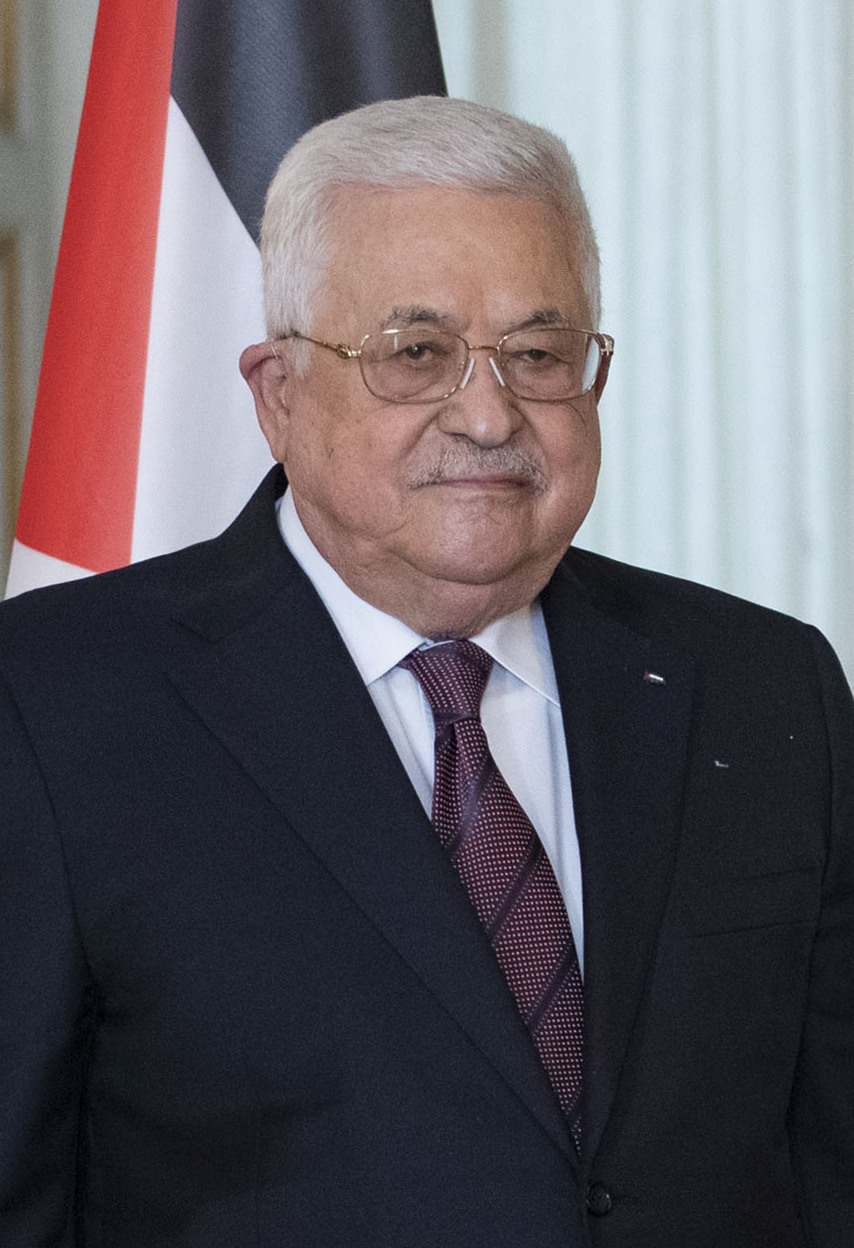
- Incumbent; Mahmoud Abbas since 29 October 2004
- Executive Committee of the Palestine Liberation Organization
- Appointer: PLO Executive Committee
- Inaugural holder: Ahmad Shukeiri
- Formation: 24 May 1964

The Chairman of the Palestine Liberation Organization, officially the Chairman of the Executive Committee of the Palestine Liberation Organization, is the leader of the Executive Committee (EC) of the Palestine Liberation Organization (PLO), the executive body of the PLO, which was established in 1964. The Chairman represents the PLO and the Palestinian people before the international community, including the United Nations. The Chairman is chosen by the members of the PLO EC. Since 29 October 2004, Mahmoud Abbas has been the Chairman of the PLO EC.

== History ==
Yasser Arafat was appointed leader of the PLO on 4 February 1969 at the meeting of the Palestinian National Council (PNC) in Cairo. He continued to be PLO leader (sometimes called Chairman, sometimes President) for 35 years, until his death on 11 November 2004. Mahmoud Abbas was acting Chairman from 29 October 2004 to 11 November 2004, while Arafat was incapacitated, and was Chairman after that date.

On 22 August 2015, Mahmoud Abbas announced his resignation as a member and Chairman of the PLO Executive Committee. However, his resignation was conditional on the approval of the PNC, which was called for 15 September. Many Palestinians saw the move as just an attempt to replace some members in the Executive Committee, or to force a meeting of the PNC and remain in their jobs until the PNC decides whether to accept or to reject their resignations. The announcement was criticised by many Palestinian factions, as the PNC had not met for nearly 20 years, and had been postponed indefinitely. The Executive Committee members who announced their resignations were to continue to hold their positions until the PNC meets.

== List of chairmen (1964–present) ==
No.	Portrait	Name (Kunya) (Birth–Death)	Term of office			Faction	Notes
No.	Portrait	Name (Kunya) (Birth–Death)	Took office	Left office	Time in office	Faction	Notes
1		Ahmad Shukeiri (1908–1980)	28 May 1964	24 December 1967	3 years, 210 days	—	
2		Yahya Hammuda (1909–2006)	24 December 1967	3 February 1969	1 year, 41 days	—	
3		Yasser Arafat (Abu Amar) (1929–2004)	4 February 1969	11 November 2004 (died in office)	35 years, 281 days	Fatah	In exile in Jordan (to April 1971), Lebanon (1971 – December 1982) and Tunisia (December 1982 – May 1994).
4		Mahmoud Abbas (Abu Mazen) (born 1935)	29 October 2004	Incumbent	21 years, 316 days	Fatah	Acting on behalf of Yasser Arafat to 11 November 2004.

== See also ==
- Leaders of Palestinian institutions
- Palestinian Ambassador to the United Nations
- President of the State of Palestine
- President of the Palestinian National Authority
- Prime Minister of the Palestinian National Authority
- Speaker of the Palestinian Legislative Council

== Bibliography ==
- Silverburg, Sanford R. (2002). Palestine and International Law: Essays on Politics and Economics. Jefferson, N.C: McFarland & Co. ISBN 0-7864-1191-0.

== External sources ==
- Official document signed by the "Chairman of the Executive Committee of the Palestine Liberation Organization"
