= Aziz Dweik =

Speaker of the Palestinian Legislative Council since 2006

- عزيز دويك

Speaker of the Palestinian Legislative Council
- Incumbent
- Assumed office 18 February 2006
- Deputy: First; Ahmad Bahar; Second; Hasan Khreisheh
- Preceded by: Rawhi Fattouh

Interim President of the Palestinian National Authority
- In office 15 January 2009 – 2 June 2014 (Note: Hamas only recognized the unity government from 2 June 2014 to 19 October 2016, when they formed a de facto government in Gaza. However, Hamas did not reclaimed the PNA President position.) (disputed with Mahmoud Abbas)
- Preceded by: Mahmoud Abbas
- Succeeded by: Mahmoud Abbas

Member of the Palestinian Legislative Council
- Incumbent
- Assumed office 18 February 2006

Personal details
- Born: Aziz Salem Murtada al-Dweik; 12 January 1948 (age 78) Cairo, Egypt
- Party: Hamas
- Children: 7
- Education: An-Najah National University; University of Pennsylvania
- Occupation: Politician, architect, university professor

Aziz Dweik (Arabic: عزيز دويك, romanized: ʿAzīz Duwayk; born 12 January 1948) is a Palestinian politician, architect, and university professor who has been serving as the speaker of the Palestinian Legislative Council (PLC) since 18 February 2006. A member of Hamas, he has been in the Palestinian Legislative Council since 2006.

Hamas recognized Dweik as the interim president of the Palestinian National Authority and of the State of Palestine from 15 January 2009, when the elected term of Mahmoud Abbas officially expired, until 2 June 2014, when Hamas and Fatah agreed on the establishment of a national unity government under Abbas as President.

In October 2023, amidst the Gaza war, Dweik, who was then living in the West Bank, was arrested by the Israel Defense Forces.

== Education and family life ==
Prior to becoming involved in political office, Dweik was a professor of urban geography at An-Najah National University in Nablus on the West Bank. He holds a PhD in Regional Science from the University of Pennsylvania.

Dweik was born on 12 January 1948 in Cairo, Egypt to a Palestinian father from Hebron, Palestine and an Egyptian mother. He now lives in Hebron. Dweik is married, with seven children. One of his daughters is a school principal, and three of his other children are students of medicine or pharmacy. Dweik's wife runs a daycare centre out of the family's house named Marj al-Zohour, after the place in Lebanon where her husband spent a year in exile in 1992.

== Political views ==
Dweik has told journalists that he views the Hamas Charter's call for the creation of a Palestinian state in all of Palestine, including Israel, to be "nothing but a dream, and unrealistic," and he believes that Hamas is aiming for the establishment of a Palestinian state in the West Bank and Gaza. He has never been accused of involvement in terrorism. His primary focus since his release from prison has been reconciling the Hamas and Fatah factions who have been engaged in a civil conflict, the result of which has been a split in the ruling PNA government, with Hamas ruling in Gaza and Fatah in the West Bank.

== Political career ==
Duweik has been associated with The Muslim Brotherhood and Hamas since as early as 1992. At that time, Hamas was an organization that had been banned by Israel and he never admitted to being a member, though he spoke to Western journalists about Hamas as someone who held knowledge of the organization and its aims. Duweik was careful to dissociate himself from the military actions carried out by Hamas, even though Hamas's early military raids, described as "effective, and deadly," were directed at Israel Defense Forces, not at civilians. In 1992, a separate military wing was established called the Izz ad-Din al-Qassam Brigades so that the political wing of Hamas could be distinguished from the military one.

=== Exile to Lebanon ===
In 1992, Dweik was among 415 Palestinians associated with Hamas or the Islamic Jihad who were arrested and exiled to southern Lebanon by the Israeli administration of Yitzhak Rabin. Rabin acknowledged that those exiled were not armed militants, but people who represented the Hamas "infrastructure". Driven to the northern border with Lebanon, he and the others were dropped off in the de-militarized zone between the two countries and warned not to come back. Lebanon refused to allow them entry, so Duweik and his compatriots remained in no-man's land. They lived in tents and built their own showers and also set up an organized hierarchical system whereby Duweik was in charge of the deportees from the West Bank, while Abdel Aziz al-Rantisi was in charge of those from the Gaza Strip. After a year, Rabin agreed to let them come back.

=== 2006 elections ===
Duweik ran for a position in the Palestinian Legislative Council (PLC) in the January 2006 elections on the Change and Reform list, made up primarily of Hamas members. The victory of Hamas in the elections prompted Israel and the United States to cut off ties to the new government, maintaining contact only with Mahmoud Abbas, the President of the Palestinian National Authority, and not Ismail Haniyeh, its new prime minister, or any other elected parliamentarians from Hamas, including Duweik. The United States immediately suspended aid to the new government, and some other Western governments were considering the same, when Duweik was sworn in as Speaker of the House on 18 February 2006. During the proceedings, which were held by video conference due to a ban on travel instituted by Israel and affecting Hamas members, among the things Duweik said were: "A hungry man is an angry man [...] We hope the world will not allow the Palestinian people to suffer, because this will only make people more radical." He also said: "My message to Israel is to put an end to the occupation, and then there will be no fighting."

In an April 2006 interview with Ynet, the Israeli media outlet, Duweik responded to a question regarding Israel's announcement of a plan to collapse the new government using economic and other means as follows:

"I say that the occupier has, according to treaties, obligations to the occupied. I also say that the money the Israelis say they don't want to transfer [$55 million in tax revenues] is not Israeli money, it is Palestinian money that Israel collects from the Palestinians, and which it is obligated to give to the Authority. If Israel preserves this stance, then the law will have to decide between us over this issue. This plan is another Israeli attempt to harm the democratic process and its outcomes, a process that was free, transparent, and which took place before the whole world's eyes. This is an attempt to harm us, but we are lions, not ants. It's not easy to harm us."

=== 2006 arrest ===
Dweik was arrested by Israel on 29 June 2006 as part of Israel's Operation Summer Rains. He was later released and then rearrested 6 August 2006. Dweik says he was severely beaten while in custody, and his lawyers say that he was held in unsanitary conditions. In August 2006, Dweik was charged in Israel for being a member of Hamas and for being in contact with Khaled Mashal, the exiled secretary-general of Hamas. He expressed his view that this was a "political trial" and stated that he did not recognize it. He accused Israel of using "political blackmail", and said that his arrest was in violation of international law. Dweik (along with a number of other Palestinian ministers and parliament members) was imprisoned in spite of his parliamentary immunity.

=== 2009 release ===
Israel released Dweik two months before the end of his three-year sentence. Released from Hadarim prison near Tel Aviv, he was then transferred to an Israeli military checkpoint outside the city of Tulkarm. He stated, "Any person deprived of his freedom feels an enormous hardship." Dweik's release came after a military tribunal near Ramallah which rejected an application by prosecutors to keep him detained, presumably because of his bad health.

=== 2012 arrest and release ===
On 19 January 2012, while traveling to Hebron, Dweik was arrested by the Israeli Army at a checkpoint outside the Palestinian village of Jaba' located between Ramallah and Jerusalem. According to witnesses, he was blindfolded, handcuffed and taken to an unknown location. Israel stated his detainment was due to "involvement in terrorist attacks." The BBC's Jerusalem correspondent Wyre Davies said Dweik's arrest will be seen by "many" as "further proof that Israel is pursuing a policy of restricting the movements of senior Palestinian figures." Hamas claimed that Israel made the arrest in order to hinder unity negotiations between their organization and rival Fatah. Duweik was placed under six months' administrative detention without trial or charge.

On 20 July, Dweik was released by the Israeli authorities and received by fellow lawmakers at the Beit Sira checkpoint. The following day he received a phone call from the then President of Egypt Mohammed Morsi congratulating him on his release. Dweik was "honored" to receive the call, stating that it represented the post-Arab Spring era.

=== 2014 arrest ===
Dweik was arrested by the Israelis again on 16 June 2014, following the kidnapping and murders of three Israeli teenagers. He was released on 9 June 2015.

=== Since 2015 ===
Hamas recognized Dweik as the Interim President of the Palestinian National Authority and of the State of Palestine from 15 January 2009, when the elected term of Mahmoud Abbas officially expired, until 2 June 2014, when Hamas and Fatah agreed on the establishment of a national unity government under Abbas as President.

In October 2023, amidst the Gaza war, Aziz Dweik, who was then living in the West Bank, was arrested by the Israel Defense Forces.

== See also ==
- Ahmad Bahar

== Notes ==
Political offices
Preceded by Rawhi Fattouh	Speaker of the Palestinian Legislative Council; 2006–present	Incumbent
Preceded by Mahmoud Abbas	Interim President of the Palestinian National Authority (Disputed with Mahmoud Abbas); 2009–2014	Succeeded by Mahmoud Abbas
