= Walid Assaf =

Palestinian politician (1960–2025)

- وليد عساف
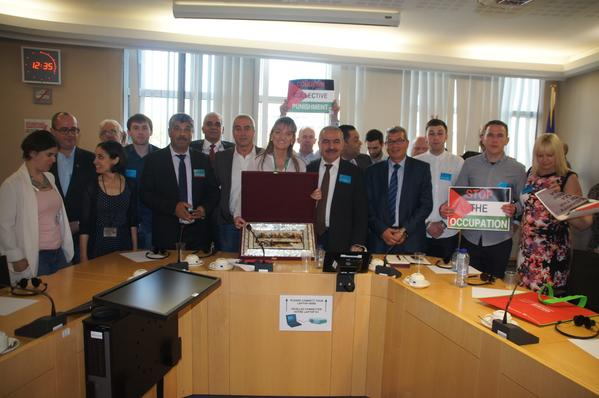

Minister of Agriculture
- In office 16 May 2012 – 2 June 2014
- Preceded by: Mahmoud Al-Habash
- Succeeded by: Shawqi Al-Aissa

Personal details
- Born: 17 December 1960; Kafr Laqif, Jordanian-occupied West Bank
- Died: 25 May 2025 (aged 64)
- Political party: Fatah
- Education: University of Engineering and Technology, Lahore (BS)
- Occupation: Electrical engineer

Walid Assaf (Arabic: وليد عساف; 17 December 1960 – 25 May 2025) was a Palestinian politician. A member of Fatah, he served as Minister of Agriculture from 2012 to 2014.

Assaf died on 25 May 2025, at the age of 64.
