= President of Palestine =

Head of state

President of the State of Palestine
- رئيس دولة فلسطين
- Presidential Emblem

- Presidential standard

- Incumbent; Mahmoud Abbas since 15 January 2005
- Style: His Excellency
- Type: Head of state; Commander-in-chief
- Residence: Presidential Palace, Ramallah
- Term length: Four years, renewable indefinitely
- Constituting instrument: Constitution of Palestine (2003)
- Inaugural holder: Yasser Arafat
- Formation: 2 April 1989
- Deputy: Vice President
- Salary: US$120,000 annually
- Website: State of Palestine, President

The president of the State of Palestine (Arabic: رئيس دولة فلسطين, romanized: Raʼīs Dawlat Filasṭīn) is the head of state of Palestine. Yasser Arafat became the first titular president of the State of Palestine in 1989, one year after the Palestinian Declaration of Independence. The title was originally titular, in parallel with the de facto title president of the Palestinian National Authority. Both functions were held by Arafat from 1994 and continued until his death in November 2004, and were continued by his successor Mahmoud Abbas. In January 2005, the Palestinian Central Council (PCC) asked Abbas to perform the duties of the president of the State of Palestine. In November 2008, the PCC approved the continuation of Abbas's function as president of the State of Palestine. Since 2013, the title president of the State of Palestine became the sole title of the Palestinian president.

== History ==
=== Titular ===
On 15 November 1988, the Palestine Liberation Organization proclaimed the State of Palestine (SoP). Yasser Arafat, the Chairman of the Palestine Liberation Organization, assumed the title "President of Palestine". The United Nations recognized the PLO as the "representative of the Palestinian people". The PLO established a Palestinian National Council and a government in exile, both representing the Palestinian people worldwide.

=== Palestinian Authority ===
The Oslo Accords established the parallel Palestinian National Authority (PA) and the Palestinian Legislative Council, both representing Palestinians in the Palestinian territories. From 1994, Arafat assumed the title of President of the Palestinian National Authority, which was consolidated by the 1996 Presidential elections. Since then, both functions (President of the SoP and of the PA) were simultaneously performed by a single person.

=== After 2013 ===
In 2012, the United Nations recognized the "State of Palestine" as non-member observer state, but this did not abolish the function of President of the Palestinian Authority, as this originated from the Oslo Accords.

== Election ==
Unlike the President of the Palestinian Authority, the position of President of the State of Palestine is not validated by democratic elections, but rather by the PLO Central Council. In 1989, the PLO Central Council elected Arafat the first President of the State of Palestine. At the time, the PLO that elected him was led by Arafat himself. After Arafat's death in November 2004, the office was vacant. In May 2005, four months after Abbas was elected President of the Palestinian Authority, the PLO Central Council asked Abbas to act as President of State of Palestine. On 23 November 2008, the PLO Central Council formalized the function by electing Abbas President of the State of Palestine. The PLO organs that appointed Abbas in 2005 and 2008 were and still are led by Abbas himself.

== List of presidents (1989–present) ==
No.	Portrait	Name (Birth–Death)	Term			Political party	Election	Ref.
No.	Portrait	Name (Birth–Death)	Took office	Left office	Duration	Political party	Election	Ref.
1	Yasser Arafat	Yasser Arafat (1929–2004)	2 April 1989	11 November 2004 †	15 years, 223 days	Fatah	1996	
–	Rawhi Fattouh	Rawhi Fattouh (born 1948); Acting	11 November 2004	15 January 2005	65 days	Fatah	–	–
2	Mahmoud Abbas	Mahmoud Abbas (born 1935) (Note: Made President of UN-observer Palestine state on 8 January 2013.) (Note: Acting until 23 November 2008.)	15 January 2005	Incumbent	21 years, 240 days	Fatah	2005	

== See also ==
- Vice President of Palestine
- Chairman of the Palestine Liberation Organization
- Prime Minister of the Palestinian National Authority
- Prime Minister of the State of Palestine
- Speaker of the Palestinian Legislative Council
- Leaders of Palestinian institutions
