= Atef Abu Bakr =

Palestinian politician and PLO member (born 1946)

- Born: 1946 (age 79–80); Ya'bad, Mandatory Palestine
- Education: University of Baghdad

Atef Abu Bakr, also known as Abu Farah, (Arabic: عاطف أبو بكر; born 1946) is a Palestinian politician and diplomat who was a member of the Palestine Liberation Organization (PLO) and then of the Abu Nidal Organization (ANO). His membership to the latter lasted until 1990. He then rejoined the PLO. He served as the PLO ambassador in different countries between 1974 and 1984.

== Early life and education ==
Abu Bakr was born in Ya'bad, Mandatory Palestine, in 1946. He is a graduate of the University of Baghdad.

== Career and activities ==
Abu Bakr was a member of the Fatah. He was appointed PLO ambassador to Yugoslavia in 1974 and remained in office until 1976. Then he served as the ambassador of the PLO to Czechoslovakia between 1976 and 1983. His last diplomatic post for the PLO was in Hungary which he held from 1983 to 1984.

Abu Bakr resigned from the PLO in February 1985 when the PLO leader Yasser Arafat and the Jordanian ruler King Hussein signed an agreement which allowed the king to make negotiations with Israel representing the Palestinians. As a result Abu Bakr joined the ANO in Syria. He was appointed director of the political department in the ANO's Fatah Revolutionary Council in 1985 and served in the post until 1987. His successor as the director of the political department was Mansour Hamdan. Abu Bakr was one of the Abu Nidal's ten-member Politburo.

Then Abu Bakr was named as the spokesman of the Fatah Revolutionary Council. He left the ANO in November 1989 while serving as the spokesman of the Fatah Revolutionary Council. His defection occurred one year after the Pan Am Flight 103 Lockerbie Bombing by the ANO. The reason for his defection was the disputes between Abu Nidal, leader of the ANO, and Abu Bakr in regard to the future moves of the group in the context of the First Intifada. Nearly 150 ANO members also left the group in the same period.

After hiding for a while, Abu Bakr returned to the PLO in 1990.
