= Speaker of the Palestinian Legislative Council =

Chairman of the Palestinian Legislative Council

- Arabic: رئيس المجلس التشريعي الفلسطيني
- Incumbent; Aziz Dweik since 18 February 2006
- Seat: Ramallah, Palestine
- Appointer: Palestinian Legislative Council
- Formation: 7 March 1996
- First holder: Ahmed Qurei

The Speaker of the Palestinian Legislative Council (Arabic: رئيس المجلس التشريعي الفلسطيني, romanized: Raʼīs al-Majlis al-Tashrīʻī al-Filasṭīnī) is the chairman of the Palestinian Legislative Council, the unicameral legislature of Palestine. As Chairman, the Speaker acts as interim President of the Palestinian National Authority if the latter is unable to perform his or her duties. Under Palestinian law, the interim President holds the role for sixty days until an election is held.

Since 18 February 2006, the Speaker has been Aziz Dweik, of Hamas, though the Palestinian Legislative Council has not met since 2007.

== History ==
After the resignation of Palestinian Prime Minister, Mahmoud Abbas, on 6 September 2003, the Speaker of the Palestinian Legislative Council, Ahmed Qurei became Prime Minister, and he would be Prime Minister until 29 March 2006.

Rawhi Fattouh became interim President of the Palestinian Authority following the death of Yasser Arafat on 11 November 2004 until 15 January 2005, when Mahmoud Abbas was sworn in as President following the election.

== List ==
No.	Portrait	Name (Birth–Death)	Term			Political party	Legislative Council	Notes
No.	Portrait	Name (Birth–Death)	Took office	Left office	Duration	Political party	Legislative Council	Notes
1		Ahmed Qurei (1937–2023)	7 March 1996	7 October 2003	7 years, 214 days	Fatah (PLO)	1	
2		Rafiq Al-Natsheh (born 1934)	3 November 2003	10 March 2004	4 months	Fatah (PLO)	1	
3		Rawhi Fattouh (born 1949)	10 March 2004	18 February 2006	1 year, 11 months	Fatah (PLO)	1	
4		Aziz Dweik (born 1948)	18 February 2006	Incumbent	20 years, 202 days	Hamas	2	

== See also ==
- Chairman of the Palestine Liberation Organization
- President of the State of Palestine
- President of the Palestinian National Authority
- Prime Minister of the State of Palestine
- Prime Minister of the Palestinian National Authority
- Leaders of Palestinian institutions
