= President of the Palestinian National Authority =

Head of state of the Palestinian National Authority

The president of the Palestinian National Authority (Arabic: رئيس السلطة الوطنية الفلسطينية, romanized: Raʼīs al-Sulṭah al-Waṭanīyah al-Filasṭīnīyah) is the highest-ranking political position (equivalent to head of state) in the Palestinian National Authority (PNA). From 2003 to 2013, the president appointed the prime minister of the Palestinian National Authority, who normally required approval of the Palestinian Legislative Council, and who shares executive and administrative power with the president. In 2013, that position was abolished and substituted by the Prime Minister of the State of Palestine position.

== Legal status ==
The Palestinian National Authority (PNA or PA) was created by the 1994 Gaza–Jericho Agreement. The 2002 Basic Law, passed by the PLC in 1997, but only ratified by President Yasser Arafat in 2002, originally established a presidential system, which granted the elected president the exclusive power to appoint and remove Ministers and to preside over the meeting of the Council of Ministers (Art. 62). Ministers were to be approved by the Legislative Council.

Under pressure from the international community and from within his own party, Fatah, Arafat appointed a Prime Minister (PM) on 19 March 2003. Accordingly, the Basic Law was amended the day before and the political system was transformed into a semi-presidential one, meaning that President and PM were collectively responsible to the PLC. Effectively, the President was compelled to relinquish some of his executive and administrative powers to the Prime Minister.

=== Powers and responsibilities (Basic Law) ===
The 2003 Amended Basic Law limits the presidential powers:

"The President of the National Authority shall exercise his executive duties as specified in this law." (Art. 38)

The 2003 Amended Basic Law stipulates that the president has the power to appoint and dismiss the prime minister (Art. 45) and the pm is accountable to the president and to the Legislative Council, and the Ministers are accountable to the Prime Minister (Art. 74). A new Government is subjected to a vote of confidence by the PLC (Art. 66). The Prime Minister chairs the Council of Ministers (Art. 68). Under the 2002 Basic Law, the President presided the Council of Ministers.

The president -

- appoints the prime minister and may dismiss him (Art. 45), but may not form a government, which is the task of the Prime Minister (Art. 68), nor approve a government, which is the task of the PLC. (Art. 66)
- promulgates or refers back the laws voted by the PLC (Art. 41), but has no legislative power, which is the task of the PLC. (Art. 47)
- issues urgent decrees with force of law, if the PLC is not in session. Those decrees must be presented to the PLC in the next convened session, otherwise they will cease to have the force of law. If not approved, they are also deemed to be no longer valid. (Art. 43)
- may declare a state of emergency by decree for a period not to exceed 30 days, when there is a threat to national security. The state of emergency may be extended for another period of 30 days, after approval by the PLC with a two-thirds majority. (Art. 110) During a state of emergency, the PLC may not be dissolved or its work hindered. (Art. 113)
- is Commander-in-Chief of the Palestinian Forces. (Art. 39)
- appoints and terminate the services of the National Authority's delegates to foreign entities. (Art. 40)

== Elections and terms ==
The term of the first president was envisioned to cover the interim phase. The second president would be elected in a general and direct election by the Palestinians in the occupied Palestinian territories. An interim period of five years was defined in the Oslo I Accord and started on 4 May 1994. The first President of the PA was accordingly appointed on 5 July 1994 and elected on 20 January 1996 for the period ending 4 May 1999.

Article 34 of the 2003 Amended Basic Law states:

"The President of the Palestinian National Authority shall be elected in a general and direct election by the Palestinian people, in accordance with the Palestinian Election Law."

The introduction of the Amended Basic Law refers to the Oslo Accords. Article III.3 of the Oslo II Accord determines:

"The Council and the Ra'ees of the Executive Authority of the Council shall be directly and simultaneously elected by the Palestinian people of the West Bank, Jerusalem and the Gaza Strip, in accordance with the provisions of this Agreement and the Election Law and Regulations, which shall not be contrary to the provisions of this Agreement."

The Basic Law (the first version originally passed in 1997, but only ratified by President Yasser Arafat in 2002) refers to the interim period as defined in the Oslo Accords, although the interim period had already ended. Article 36 reads:

"The term of the presidency of the National Authority shall be the interim phase, after which the President shall be elected in accordance with the law."

Since the original Basic Law was designed only for the interim period as specified in the Oslo Accords—a period that was supposed to end in 1999—there was no provision for re-election.

=== 2005 Amendment ===
The 2005 Amended Basic Law, issued on 13 August 2005, changed the president's term from "the interim phase" to "four years" and restricted the position to two consecutive terms. The law also fixed the term of the Palestinian Legislative Council to four years, in line with Article 2 of the 2005 Elections Law No. 9, also issued on 13 August 2005, which additionally stipulates that the secret and free direct elections of President and Council members shall be held simultaneously.

Furthermore, the 2005 Amended Law determines that "the term of the current Legislative Council shall terminate when the members of the new elected Council take the constitutional oath." The first four-year-term would thus start with the next Council. In 2005, the "current Legislative Council" was the one elected on 20 January 1996. Given the stipulation that "The President and the council members shall be elected simultaneously" (Elections Law), this means that the new presidential term would start with the election of the new Council.

The 2005 Amended Basic Law was promulgated on 13 August 2005 by Mahmoud Abbas in his capacity of Chairman of the Executive Committee of the Palestine Liberation Organization and of President of the Palestinian National Authority.

=== Presidential and parliamentary terms dilemma ===
The 2005 Basic Law amendment fixes a four-year term for both the president and Parliament, while the 2005 Elections Law (Art. 2) determines that both are elected simultaneously. But a half-year before the laws were signed, President Arafat had died, and Mahmoud Abbas was elected president, whereas the old parliament remained in function. To synchronize both terms, the lawmakers chose to stick the presidential elections on the elections of the second Legislative Council (Elections Law Art. 111). Contrary to the Elections Law, no presidential elections took place but instead Abbas, elected in 2005, remained in function. Nathan Brown argued that it was, in theory, a single election held on two different dates. However, it is debatable whether Abbas' first term started in 2005 or in 2006, while he took the presidential oath in January 2005. Elections for the second Legislative Council were on 25 January 2006. According to the law, the four-year term of both the president and Parliament would thus start at that date (2005 Elections Law, Art. 2).

In July 2008, the Ramallah-based "Fatwa and Legislation Office" issued a legal opinion on the presidential term of Mahmoud Abbas. It ruled that, based on Basic Law and Elections Law, the current term should be extended with one year, thus until 25 January 2010, the end of the current legislative term. Since the June 2007 split of the Palestinian administration there was also a competitive Fatwa and Legislation Office based in Gaza, the opinion was challenged. The Hamas faction disputed the verdict, supported by the Gazan-based Fatwa and Legislation Office. They argued that the Basic Law overturns the Elections Law, and that PLC Speaker Aziz Dweik is the interim president with deputy PLC Speaker Ahmad Bahar being the legal acting president as the former was imprisoned in Israel. The Palestinian Centre for Human Rights held the view that the issue should be judged by the Constitutional Court, but did not expect that Hamas would recognize the Ramallah-based institution. The PCHR warned for two competitive presidents and as elections were under the present circumstances impossible anyway, it saw no alternative for dialogue between the parties.

=== End of terms ===
The office of the president becomes vacant when the term to which the president is elected ends or in exceptional cases. Exceptional cases are death, or resignation submitted to the Palestinian Legislative Council and accepted by two-thirds of its members, or loss of legal capacity, according to a High Constitutional Court ruling and approved by two-thirds of the PLC members. If the office of the president becomes vacant, the speaker of the PLC shall temporarily assume the powers and duties of the presidency until free and direct elections take place within a period not to exceed 60 days to elect a new president (Art. 37).

== Presidents ==
=== Yasser Arafat ===
As upon the establishment of the Palestinian Authority there had not been held presidential elections, Yasser Arafat as Chairman of the PLO and as the man who negotiated the Oslo Accords, became as a matter of course the first Ra'ees or President of the Palestinian National Authority on 5 July 1994, upon the formal inauguration of the governing body. With the elections on 20 January 1996, Arafat's presidency for the interim phase was formalized.

Arafat remained the president until his death on 11 November 2004, after which House Speaker Rauhi Fattouh became acting president. On 12 November, Fattouh instructed to start preparations for holding elections within 60 days.

=== Mahmoud Abbas ===
New elections were held on 9 January 2005, and won by Mahmoud Abbas. Abbas's term expired on 9 January 2009, creating a constitutional crisis. Abbas unilaterally extended his term by one year and is recognised as president by the government of Salam Fayad, which governed parts of the West Bank. After this Aziz Dweik, as the speaker of the Palestinian Legislative Council, was recognized as acting president by the government of Ismail Haniyeh that governed the Gaza Strip. From 2014 to 2016 Rami Hamdallah was recognized by both sides as head of government and Mahmoud Abbas as president.

== The title ==
The Arabic term Ra'ees or Ra'is (رئيس) can be translated to English as either "President" or "Chairman".

As the status of Palestine as a political entity is controversial, the use of the term President to describe the leader of the Palestinian government is controversial to some, as its use may be seen to imply a recognition of state sovereignty. Until October 2006, Israel refused to use the title "President" for the Head of Palestine. The use of the term "Chairman" is controversial for the opposite reason—its use may be seen to imply denial of Palestinian aspirations for statehood.

The Arabic term was used in the English text of the 1995 Israeli-Palestinian Interim Agreement on the West Bank and the Gaza Strip, part of the Oslo accords which established the PNA. A letter delivered from (PLO Chairman) Yasser Arafat to the then Prime Minister of Israel, Yitzhak Rabin, as part of the Gaza-Jericho agreement stated that "When Chairman Arafat enters the Gaza Strip and the Jericho Area, he will use the title 'Chairman (Ra'ees in Arabic) of the Palestinian Authority' or 'Chairman of the PLO', and will not use the title 'President of Palestine.'"

In practice, when referring to the ra'ees in English documents and statements, the PNA uses the term "president", whereas Israel uses "chairman". News releases from its embassy in Israel refer to the PNA "chairman"; press briefings in Washington use "president"; both occasionally avoid the issue with "Palestinian leader". Israeli press refers to the leader variously as "ra'ees", "president", "chairman" or by name alone. The international English-language press mostly (but not always) follows the Palestinian terminology.

The United States, in its role as peace broker, uses several different terms according to context. There are some documents signed by Arafat as 'Chairman'. The same term was used by Bill Clinton during 2000 Camp David Summit.

== List of presidents (1994–present) ==
No.	Portrait	Name (Birth–Death)	Term			Political party
No.	Portrait	Name (Birth–Death)	Took office	Left office	Duration	Political party
1		Yasser Arafat (1929–2004)	5 July 1994	11 November 2004 †	10 years, 129 days	Fatah (PLO)
–		Rawhi Fattouh (born 1949); Interim President	11 November 2004	15 January 2005	65 days	Fatah (PLO)
2		Mahmoud Abbas (born 1935) (Note: President of the Palestinian National Authority of the Government in the West Bank.)	15 January 2005	Incumbent (Note: Disputed from 15 January 2009 to 2 June 2014.)	21 years, 141 days	Fatah (PLO)
–		Aziz Dweik (born 1949); Interim President	15 January 2009	2 June 2014 (Note: Hamas only recognized the unity government from 2 June 2014 to 19 October 2016, when they formed a de facto government in Gaza. However, Hamas did not reclaimed the PNA President position.)	5 years, 138 days	Hamas

== See also ==
- Chairman of the Palestine Liberation Organization
- President of the State of Palestine
- Vice President of Palestine
- Prime Minister of the Palestinian National Authority
- Speaker of the Palestinian Legislative Council
- Leaders of Palestinian institutions
