= Rawhi Fattouh =

Palestinian politician (born 1949)

- روحي أحمد محمد فتوح

Chairman of the Palestinian National Council
- Incumbent
- Assumed office 7 February 2022
- Deputy: Ali Faisal; Mousa Hadid
- Preceded by: Salim al-Za'nun

Member of the Central Committee of Fatah
- Incumbent
- Assumed office 3 December 2016

President of the Palestinian National Authority
- Interim
- In office 11 November 2004 – 15 January 2005
- Prime Minister: Ahmed Qurei
- Preceded by: Yasser Arafat
- Succeeded by: Mahmoud Abbas

3rd Speaker of the Palestinian Legislative Council
- In office 10 March 2004 – 18 February 2006
- Preceded by: Rafiq Al-Natsheh
- Succeeded by: Aziz Dweik

Minister of Agriculture
- In office 12 November 2003 – 10 March 2004
- Prime Minister: Ahmed Qurei
- Preceded by: Salam Fayyad (acting)
- Succeeded by: Ibrahim Abu al-Naga

Member of the Palestinian Legislative Council for Rafah Governorate
- In office 7 March 1996 – 18 February 2006

Personal details
- Born: Rawhi Ahmed Muhammad Fattouh; 23 August 1949 (age 77) Rafah, All-Palestine Protectorate
- Party: Fatah
- Education: University of Damascus

Rawhi Fattuh (Arabic: روحي فتوح, Rawḥī Fatūḥ, also transliterated as Rauhi Fattouh; born 23 August 1949) is a Palestinian politician and senior member of Fatah who has served as Chairman of the Palestinian National Council since 2022, succeeding Salim al-Zan'un. He previously served as Minister of Agriculture from 2003 to 2004 and Speaker of the Palestinian Legislative Council from 2004 to 2006.

Following the death of President Yasser Arafat on 11 November 2004, Fattuh became interim President of the Palestinian Authority, in accordance with the Palestinian Basic Law. He held the position until elections were held and won by Abbas, who was sworn in on 15 January 2005. Fattuh was elected to Fatah's Central Committee in December 2016.

On 27 November 2024, President Mahmoud Abbas issued a decree naming Fattuh as interim President of the Palestinian Authority in the event of Abbas’s death or resignation. Abbas later appointed Hussein al-Sheikh as Vice President of the State of Palestine on 26 April 2025.

== Biography ==
Rawhi Fattouh was elected in 1996 as a member of the Palestinian Legislative Council of the town of Rafah (in the southern Gaza Strip) for Fatah, where he was born and has lived for most of his life. He served as Secretary to the PLC until October 2003, when he became the Minister of Agriculture during the first year of the Second Qurei Government from 2003 until 2004.

In July 2004, Fattah’s parliamentary bloc nominated Fattouh as its candidate for Speaker of the Palestinian Legislative Council. He was elected to the position with the support of 34 Fatah delegates, while 10 voted against his nomination. In November of the same year, Fattuh supported Ahmed Qurei, his predecessor as speaker and former prime minister, to succeed Arafat as president.

Fattouh was sworn in as interim President of the Palestinian National Authority before the Palestinian Legislative Council in Ramallah on 11 November 2004, following the death of Yasser Arafat. In his inaugural address, he praised Arafat as a martyr of the Palestinian people and pledged to faithfully follow Arafat's policies. Fattouh did not seek re-election in the 2006 legislative election and subsequently ceased to be a member of the Palestinian Legislative Council.

In 2022, he chaired the 18-member Executive Committee of the Palestine Liberation Organization, which was dominated by members of Fatah. A member of the Palestinian National Council since 1983, Fattouh was regarded by some analysts as lacking significant political influence or charisma, limiting his ability to wield real power despite his senior positions.

In January 2023, Israel revoked Fattouh’s entry permit—along with those of two other senior Palestinian officials—after they visited Karim Younis, a prisoner recently released after serving a sentence for the 1980 murder of an Israeli soldier.

On 30 November 2024, President Mahmoud Abbas issued a decree nominating Fattouh to assume the presidency of the Palestinian Authority in the event of his death or incapacity. However, according to article 37 of the Palestinian Basic Law, if the office of the President becomes vacant, the Speaker of the Palestinian Legislative Council is constitutionally mandated to serve as interim President for a period not exceeding sixty days, during which presidential elections must be held, procedure which was itself applied with Fattouh in 2006. Since the PLC was officially dissolved by Abbas in 2018 and had not convened in full since June 2007 due to political divisions, the nomination of Fattouh was justified by the absence of an active legislative body capable of fulfilling the constitutional role.

== Views ==
At an event in Algeria in 2023, Fattuh claimed that Arabs had inhabited Jerusalem for over 1.5 million years. He also claimed that the first human civilizations appeared in Mount Carmel, furthermore that the Kebaran "engineering civilization" appeared in the Kebara Cave, 60,000 years ago.[10]

Both of those claims contradict current scientific understanding. The oldest known humans came much later; the Kebaran culture was a hunter gatherer culture from about 30,000 years later.

Political offices
Preceded by Salam Fayyad	Minister of Agriculture; 2003–2004	Succeeded by Ibrahim Abu al-Naga
Preceded by Rafiq Al-Natsheh	Speaker of the Palestinian Legislative Council; 2004–2006	Succeeded by Aziz Dweik
Preceded by Yasser Arafat	Interim President of the Palestinian National Authority; 2004–2005	Succeeded by Mahmoud Abbas
Preceded by Salim al-Za'nun	Chairman of the Palestinian National Council; 2022–present	Incumbent
