= Palestinian Legislative Council =

Unicameral legislature of the Palestinian Authority

Palestinian Legislative Council المجلس التشريعي الفلسطيني Al-Majlis al-Tashrīʿiyy al-Filasṭīniyy
- 2nd Legislative Council

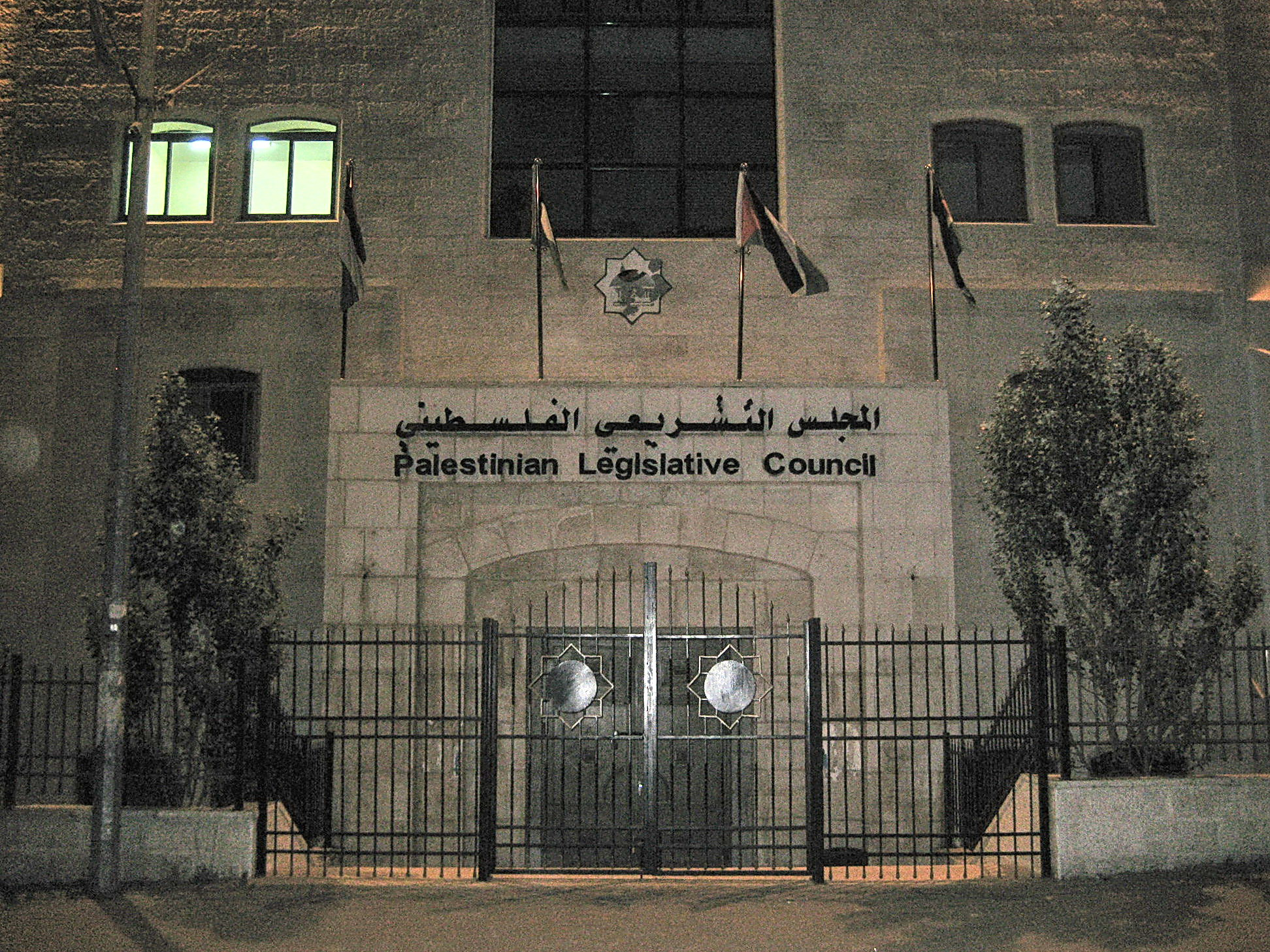
- Entrance to the Palestinian Legislative Council in Ramallah

Type
- Type: Unicameral

History
- Founded: 1996
- Disbanded: 2007

Leadership
- Speaker: Aziz Dweik, Hamas since 18 February 2006 (Note: Dweik was Speaker following the 2006 election. In 2009, he claimed the Presidency by virtue of the expiry of Mahmoud Abbas's term and the absence of new elections.)

Structure
- Seats: 132
- Political groups: Hamas (74); PLO (50); Fatah (45); PFLP (3); DFLP (1) (Note: marked with a grey border.); PPP (1) (Note: marked with a black border.); PNI (2); Third Way (2); Independents (4)

Elections
- Voting system: Parallel additional member system: 66 seats are elected by Proportional representation; 66 seats are elected by Single-member district
- First election: 20 January 1996
- Last election: 25 January 2006
- Next election: 11 September 2027

Website
- www.plc.ps (Gaza Strip government) www.pal-plc.org (West Bank government)

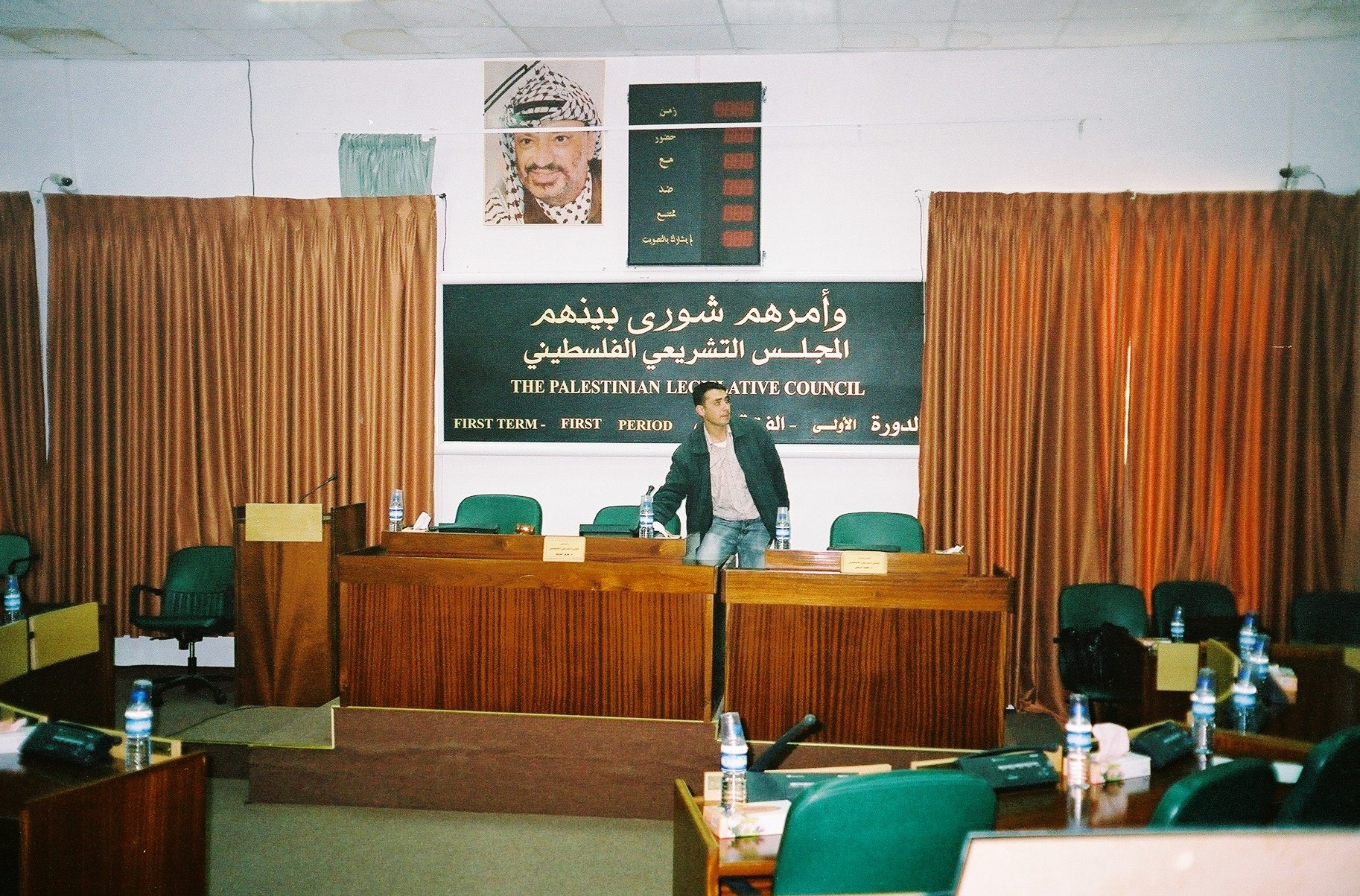
Inside the Palestinian Legislative Council in 2006

The Palestinian Legislative Council (PLC; Arabic: المجلس التشريعي الفلسطيني, romanized: Al-Majlis al-Tashrīʿiyy al-Filasṭīniyy) is the unicameral legislature of the Palestinian National Authority, elected by the Palestinian residents of the Palestinian territories of the West Bank and Gaza Strip. It currently comprises 132 members, elected from 16 electoral districts of the Palestinian Authority. The PLC has a quorum requirement of two-thirds, and since 2006 Hamas and Hamas-affiliated members have held 74 of the 132 seats in the PLC. The PLC's activities have been suspended since 2007. However, PLC committees continue working at a low rate and parliamentary panel discussions are still occurring.

The first PLC met for the first time on 7 March 1996. Under the Oslo II Accord, the powers and responsibilities of the PLC are restricted to civil matters and internal security in Area A of the West Bank and Gaza, while in Area B they are restricted to civil affairs with security matters being under the control of the Israel Defense Forces. In Area C, Israel has full control.

The 2006 election for the second PLC was the most recent PLC election. Following the Hamas–Fatah split in 2007, the PLC ceased to function, with the President issuing laws by decree. Elections for the third PLC were scheduled for May 2021, but were indefinitely postponed.

== Overview ==
The Palestinian Legislative Council was created by the Oslo Accords and designed in accordance with the provisions of the Oslo II Accord, which provides for its composition, powers and responsibilities in detail. Detailed provisions regarding elections were set out in Annex II. Oslo II provides that residents of the Palestinian territories may vote or be elected. The PLC has a quorum requirement of two-thirds.

PLC laws provide further details for the PLC, such as the time limit on the duration or life of each PLC, and provisions for filling casual vacancies. There was no requirement for ministers to be members of the PLC.

The powers and responsibilities of the PLC are limited by Article IX and XVII of the Oslo Accords to civil matters and internal security and public order and subject to review by Israel. The PLC is not authorised to negotiate with Israel.

== History ==
=== First Palestinian Legislative Council, 1996–2006 ===
The first Palestinian legislative election took place on 20 January 1996 in accordance with Palestinian Election Law No. 13 of 1995 and its amendments. The law adopted the simple majority system (districts). However, the election was boycotted by Hamas, and Fatah won 62 of the 88 seats. The first PLC met for the first time on 7 March 1996. The Council was intended to replace the Arafat/Fatah-controlled Palestinian Authority, which was established as a temporary organ, pending the inauguration of the Council. However, Arafat never transferred his powers to the PLC.

After the resignation of Palestinian Prime Minister, Mahmoud Abbas, on 6 September 2003, the Speaker of the Palestinian Legislative Council, Ahmed Qurei became acting Prime Minister. Qurei was Prime Minister from 7 October 2003 to 29 March 2006.

=== Second Palestinian Legislative Council, 2006–present ===
The Basic Law was amended in 2003. Under Article 66 of the Amended Basic Law of 2003, the approval of the PLC was required of each new government. The PLC in June 2005 increased the number of PLC members from 88 to 132, with half being elected under a system of proportional representation and half by plurality-at-large voting in traditional constituencies.

A further Amended Basic Law of 2005 in August 2005 set a term of four years for the President, who may not serve more than two consecutive terms, and of the PLC at four years from the date of election. The second Palestinian legislative election took place on 25 January 2006, which resulted in a decisive victory for Hamas. The second PLC was sworn in on 18 February 2006. Subsequently, the Hamas government was formed and sworn in on 29 March 2006.

The European Union supplied election observers to "assess the whole election process, including the legal framework, the political environment and campaign, electoral preparations, voting and counting as well as the post-election period". The United States had spent $2.3 million in USAID to support the Palestinian elections, allegedly designed to bolster the image of President Abbas and his Fatah party.

After the Hamas takeover of the Gaza Strip in June 2007, the Gaza-based Hamas PLC members would meet separately in Gaza, leaving each part of the PLC without a quorum. The PLC has not convened since, and awaits a Fatah–Hamas reconciliation. Laws have been made by presidential decree, the legality of which has been questioned, especially by Hamas, which has refused to recognise such laws and decisions. Following the Hamas takeover of Gaza, President Abbas declared a state of emergency and, by presidential decree, besides other things, suspended the articles of the Amended Basic Law that required PLC approval of a new government.

=== Third Palestinian Legislative Council ===
In September 2007, following the Hamas takeover of Gaza, President Abbas by presidential decree changed the voting system for the PLC into a full proportional representation system, bypassing the dysfunctional PLC.

The 2006 election was the last Palestinian legislative election, though under the Basic Law the term of a PLC is four years. Fatah and Hamas had agreed in the 2014 Fatah–Hamas Agreements that the election for the third PLC take place sometime in 2014, but has been postponed because of continuing disagreements between Hamas and Fatah.

Elections for the third PLC were scheduled for 22 May 2021, but were indefinitely postponed on 29 April 2021.

== Historical composition ==
| PFLP / Alt. / PNI / 3rd Way / Fatah / Indep. / Hamas / Others | | Total; Seats |
| 1996 | 50 / 35 / 3 | 88 |
| 2006 | 3 / 2 / 2 / 2 / 45 / 4 / 74 | 132 |

== Malfunction ==
From the beginning, the PLC was not able to function properly for a number of reasons:

- Curtailment of freedom of movement
  - In the months following the inauguration, members of the PLC (consisting of only Fatah members and moderate non-Fatah members) were subjected to restrictions on their freedom of movement by Israel, as reported by human rights group PCHR. They had to obtain a permit from the Israeli authorities for every single journey, valid for very short periods and sometimes refused.
  - In 2001, the European Parliament noticed in a resolution that "The Palestinian Legislative Council is more often than not hindered from attending the sessions."
- Isolation from the outside world. Israel prevents official contacts with the outside world. Even visits of members of the European Parliament to Gaza were denied.
- Israeli interference with the composition of the PLC. Politicians disliked by Israel were, and still are, prevented from political activities, often by arresting them, holding them in detention for lengthy periods and without charge or trial. After the 2006 elections, Israel captured and detained high numbers of PLC members and ministers. By selectively capturing and detaining or even killing Hamas members, Israel changed the composition of the PLC significantly.
- Splitting of the Palestinian Government into two entities after the 2007 Fatah–Hamas battle in Gaza. Since the separation, the Palestinian Legislative Council has not convened.
- Divided views of the Palestinians towards the validity of the Oslo Accords and the Roadmap for peace. This weakens the position of the PLC.

== Relationship to PNC ==
While the PLC is elected by Palestinian residents of the Palestinian territories, it is not the parliament of the State of Palestine. Accordingly, the Palestinian Authority is not the government of the State of Palestine, but the self-government of the inhabitants of the territories. On the contrary, Palestine Liberation Organization (PLO) is recognized by the United Nations as the Government of the State of Palestine. The PLO has its own parliament, the Palestinian National Council (PNC), which is formally chosen by the Palestinian people in and outside of the Palestinian territories. Accordingly, the PLO Executive Committee, formally elected by the PNC, is the official government of the State of Palestine on behalf of the PLO. The PLO does not itself field candidates for the PLC, but member parties or factions of the PLO can field candidates. The largest of those parties is Fatah.

Pursuant to the PA's "1995 Elections Law No. 13", the 132 PLC members would automatically become members of the PNC. This was revoked, however, by the "2005 Elections Law No. 9", which does not mention the PNC at all. The 2007 Elections Law No. 2, issued by presidential decree of President Abbas, re-instated the determination (Article 4). As this PA legislation was neither enacted by the PLO nor the PNC, its legal validity is questioned in a PLO document. The document also states that "as opposed to the PNC, the PLC only represents the Palestinian population of the Occupied Territory, and does not reflect the political will of the entire Palestinian People".

As Abbas, as of July 2015, was the chairman of the Fatah-dominated PLO as well as of Fatah itself, and the disputed president of the Palestinian Authority (which also calls itself the State of Palestine), the functions of the PLO and of the PA are not clearly distinguished. While both PLC and PNC are virtually defunct, the functions of both legislatures are performed by the PLO Central Council.

== Buildings ==
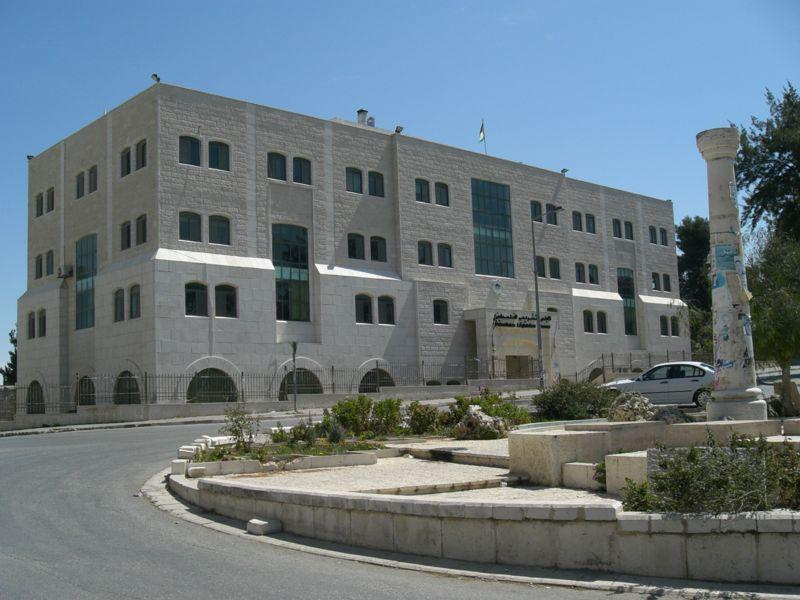
PLC building, Ramallah

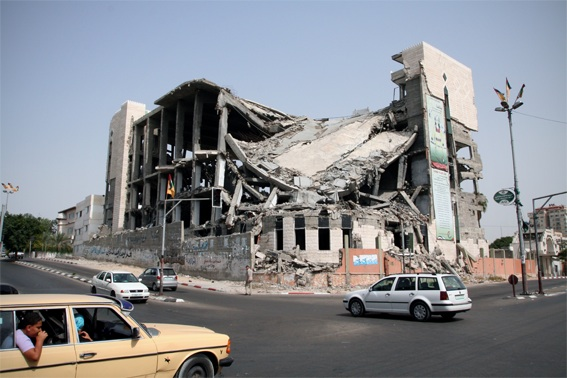
The destroyed Palestinian Legislative Council building in Gaza City in September 2009.

As of April 2002, in the West Bank, the PLC has two main buildings, one in Ramallah in the Ministry of Education, housing the Assembly Chambers, and the main administrative office of the PLC in al-Bireh, adjacent to Ramallah. In Gaza, the headquarters is in Rimal, Gaza City.

In 2000, the construction of a Parliament Building to possibly house the PLC was started in Abu Dis, adjacent to East Jerusalem, where most of the Palestinian Authority's offices responsible for Jerusalem affairs are located, but the project was never finished.

The PLC buildings have repeatedly been the target of Israeli attacks. In 2002, the headquarters in the West Bank were heavily damaged and equipment destroyed. In January 2009, the Gaza headquarters was bombed during Operation Cast Lead. The attacks were condemned by the UN Goldstone Mission, which called it a "grave breach of extensive destruction of property, not justified by military necessity and carried out unlawfully and wantonly." The building was destroyed in September 2009.

== See also ==
- Current members of Palestinian Legislative Council
- Palestinian Legislative Council (Gaza Strip)
