= Israeli–Palestinian conflict =

Ongoing military and political conflict in West Asia

- Part of the Arab–Israeli conflict
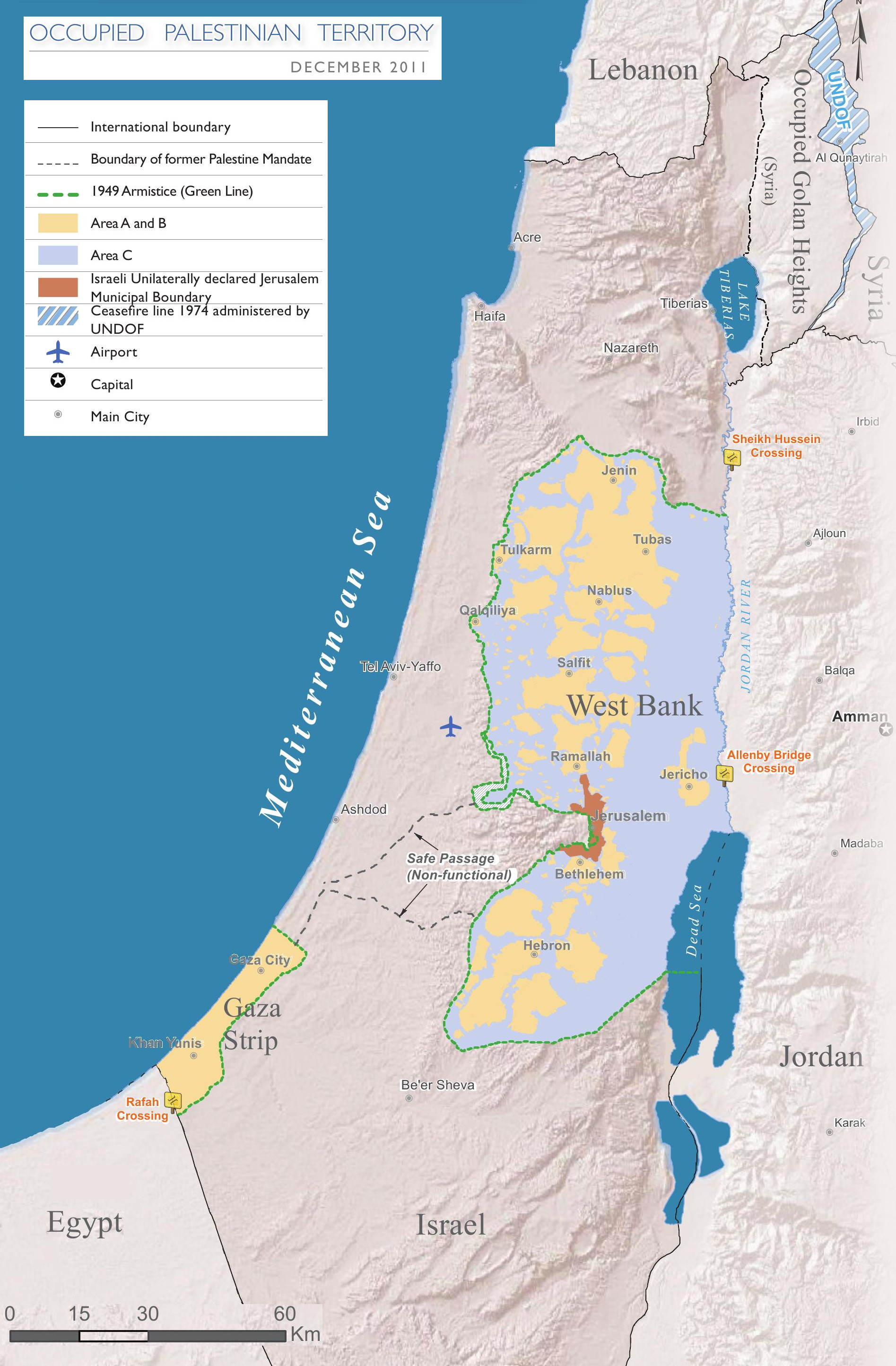
- Situation in the Israeli-occupied territories, as of December 2011, per the United Nations OCHA. See here for a more detailed and updated map.
Date	c. 19th century – present
Location	West Asia
Status	Ongoing: Israeli–Palestinian peace process (halted); Gaza–Israel conflict (intermittent); Gaza war; Gaza genocide
Territorial changes	1948–1967: Egypt occupies the Gaza Strip; Establishment of the All-Palestine Protectorate (until 1959); Jordan annexes the West Bank; Since 1967: Israel occupies the Gaza Strip; Unilateral disengagement (2005); Israel occupies the West Bank; Establishment of Israeli settlements; Israeli annexation of East Jerusalem; Division of Israeli control and Palestinian control by the Oslo II Accord (1995)

Belligerents
Israel: Pre-1948: Yishuv; Bar-Giora; Hashomer; Haganah; Irgun; Lehi; 1948–present: Israeli security forces; Israeli settlers (since 1967)	Palestinians: Pre-1948: Muslim-Christian Associations; Palestine Arab Congress; Arab Higher Committee; 1948–present: 1948: Arab Higher Committee; All-Palestine Protectorate; Army of the Holy War 1949–1956: Palestinian fedayeen (Note: The 1949–1956 Palestinian fedayeen insurgency culminated in the 1956 Suez Crisis.) 1964–2005: PLO (1964–2005) (Note: The Palestinian Authority was created by and is ultimately accountable to the PLO (see Palestinian Authority#Government and politics). Under the administration of Mahmoud Abbas (2005–present), the PA has coordinated security with Israel and worked to suppress anti-Israel militants.); UNLU (1987–1993) (Note: During the First Intifada.); Palestinian Authority (1994–2005) (Note: Under the administration of Mahmoud Abbas (2005–present), the PA has coordinated security with Israel and worked to suppress anti-Israel militants.) 2007–present: Hamas government; Palestinian Joint Operations Room (2018–present) (Note: Consists of the armed wings of Hamas and allied Palestinian militant organizations.)

Casualties and losses
9,901–10,239 killed	104,701–110,887 killed
- By event: More than 700,000 Palestinians displaced with a further 413,000 Palestinians displaced in the Six-Day War; 2,000+ Jews displaced in 1948 6,373 Israeli and 13,000–16,000 Palestinian deaths in the 1948 Arab–Israeli War. 654 Israeli and 19,085 Palestinian and Lebanese deaths in the 1982 Lebanon War in addition to 800–3,500 in the Sabra-Shatila massacre. 1,962 Palestinians and 179–200 Israeli deaths in the First Intifada. 1,010 Israelis and 3,179–3,354 Palestinian deaths in the Second Intifada. 402 Palestinians killed in the 2006 Gaza–Israel conflict. 1,116–1,417 Palestinian deaths in the Gaza War (2008–2009). 2,125–2,310 Palestinian deaths in the 2014 Gaza War. 285 Palestinian and 17 Israeli deaths in the 2021 Israel–Palestine crisis. As of 22 September 2026, at least 81,319+ Palestinians and 2,046+ Israelis killed in the Gaza war with a further 1,900,000 Palestinians displaced within Gaza and 135,000 Israeli evacuees. Indirect deaths (Note: In addition to direct deaths, armed conflicts result in indirect deaths "attributable to the conflict". Mortality due to indirect deaths could be due to a variety of causes, such as infectious diseases.) likely to be several times higher than those killed by violence, with estimates for total Palestinian deaths in the Gaza war are between 186,000– 335,500 (Note: estimate for year end 2024)

Israel and the Palestinians are engaged in an ongoing military and political conflict about land and self-determination within the former territory of Mandatory Palestine. Key aspects of the conflict have included Palestinian refugees, the Israeli occupation of the West Bank and Gaza Strip, the status of Jerusalem, Israeli settlements, borders, security, water rights, the permit regime in the West Bank and in the Gaza Strip, Palestinian freedom of movement, and the Palestinian right of return.

The conflict has its origins in the rise of Zionism in the late 19th century in Europe, a movement which aimed to establish a Jewish state through colonization in the region of Palestine. The Zionist movement garnered the support of an imperial power in the 1917 Balfour Declaration issued by Britain, which promised to support the creation of a "Jewish homeland" in Palestine. Following British occupation of the formerly Ottoman region during World War I, Mandatory Palestine was established as a British mandate. Increasing Jewish immigration led to the rapid growth of the Yishuv, or Jewish population in Palestine, heightening tensions and conflict between Jews and Arabs over land and economic issues. The 1936 Arab general strike led to the Peel Commission investigation, and began the 1936–1939 Arab revolt in Palestine, which demanded an end to British colonial rule and its support for Zionism. Eventually, the inability of British government to resolve tensions led to the creation of the United Nations Special Committee on Palestine. The United Nations later voted to adopt their recommendations as a partition plan in 1947. The plan was rejected by the Arab Higher Committee and the Arab League, triggering the 1947–1948 civil war in Mandatory Palestine.

During the ensuing 1948 Palestine war, the State of Israel was founded and more than half of the mandate's predominantly Palestinian Arab population fled or were expelled by Israeli forces, referred to by Palestinians as the Nakba. By the end of the war, Israel was established on most of the former mandate's territory, and the Gaza Strip and the West Bank were controlled by Egypt and Jordan respectively. Since the 1967 Six-Day War, Israel has been occupying the West Bank and the Gaza Strip, known collectively as the Palestinian territories. Two Palestinian uprisings against Israel and its occupation erupted in 1987 and 2000, the first and second intifadas respectively. Israel's occupation resulted in Israel constructing illegal settlements there, creating a system of institutionalized discrimination against Palestinians under its occupation referred to as Israeli apartheid. This discrimination includes Israel's denial of Palestinian refugees from their right of return and right to their lost properties. Israel has also drawn international condemnation for violating the human rights of the Palestinians.

The international community, with exceptions including the United States and Israel that prefer bilateral negotiations, has largely been in consensus since the 1980s regarding a settlement of the conflict on the basis of a two-state solution along the 1967 borders and a just resolution for Palestinian refugees. In recent years, public support for a two-state solution has decreased, with Israeli policy reflecting an interest in maintaining the occupation, rather than seeking a permanent resolution to the conflict. In 2007, Israel tightened its blockade of the Gaza Strip and made official its policy of isolating it from the West Bank. Since then, Israel has framed its relationship with Gaza in terms of the laws of war, rather than in terms of its status as an occupying power. In a July 2024 advisory opinion, the International Court of Justice (ICJ) determined that Israel continues to illegally occupy the West Bank and Gaza Strip.

Since 2006, Israel has fought several wars with the ruling party in the Gaza Strip, Hamas. Attacks by Hamas-led armed groups in October 2023 in Israel, which resulted in nearly 1,200 deaths, were followed by another war, which has caused widespread destruction, loss of life, mass population displacement, a humanitarian crisis, and a famine in the Gaza Strip. Israel's actions in Gaza during this war have been described by international law experts, genocide scholars and human rights organizations as a genocide.

== History ==
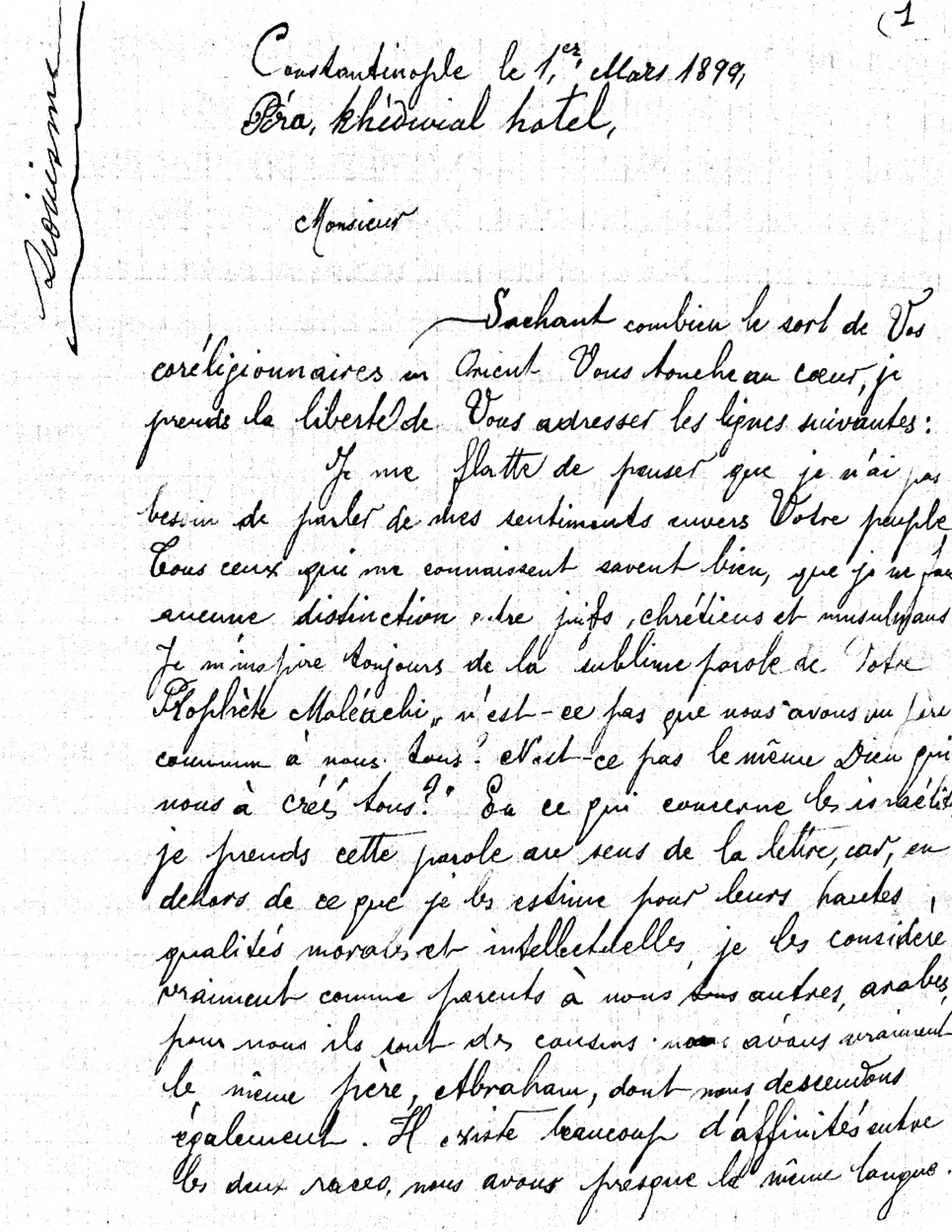
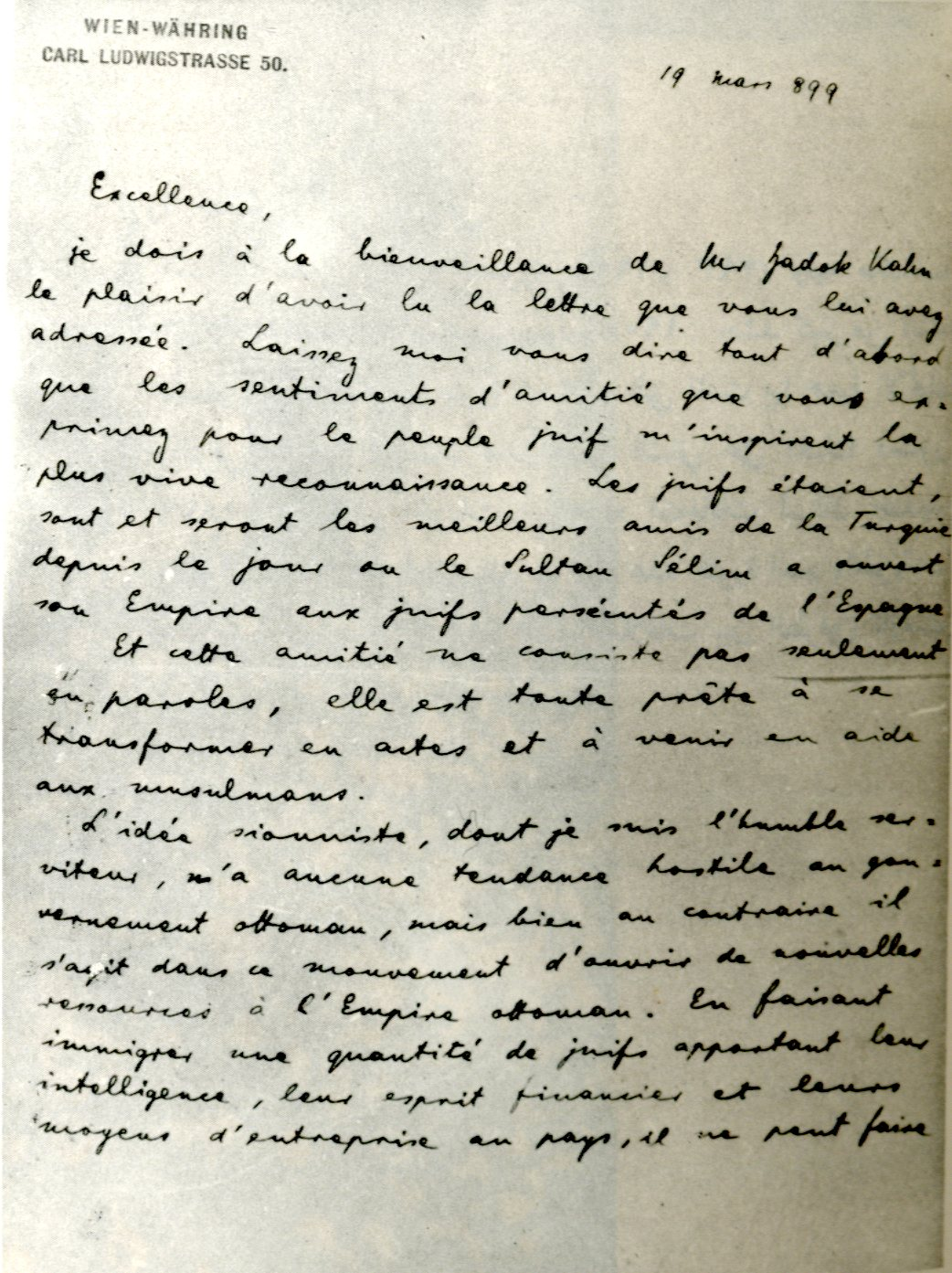
March 1899 correspondence between Yousef al-Khalidi, mayor of Jerusalem and author of the letter on the left, and Theodore Herzl, founder of the Zionist Organization and author of the letter on the right.

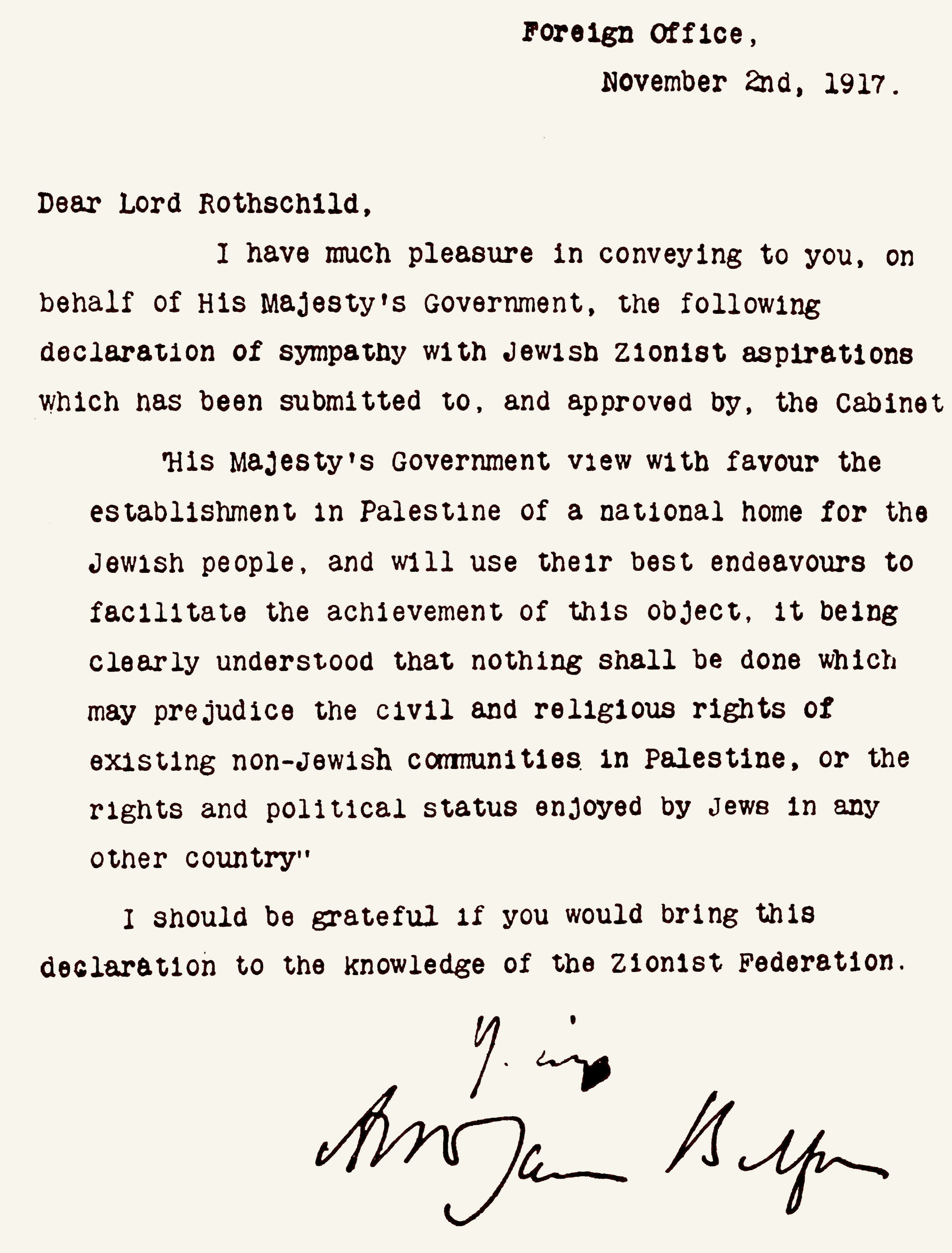
The 1917 Balfour Declaration from UK Foreign Secretary Arthur Balfour to Walter Rothschild expressing the support of the British government for "the establishment in Palestine of a national home for the Jewish people."

The Israeli–Palestinian conflict began in the late 19th and early 20th centuries, with the development of political Zionism and the arrival of Zionist settlers to Palestine. During the early 20th century, Arab nationalism and Turkish nationalism also grew within the Ottoman Empire. World War I began in 1914, with Great Britain and France opposing the Ottoman Empire. To gain support from Sharif of Mecca Hussein bin Ali, his Arab Sharifian Army, and Arab nationalists in the war against the Ottomans, Great Britain promised in the McMahon–Hussein correspondence that Hussein would have control of an independent state in the Arab areas of the Ottoman Empire. Palestine was "ambiguously omitted" from the Arab state. The British Empire supplied a large amount of weapons to the Arab revolt in 1916–1918. With support from the Arab revolt the British Empire defeated the Ottoman's forces and took control of Palestine, Jordan and Syria. It later transpired that the British and French governments had secretly made the Sykes-Picot Agreement in 1916 that unambiguously excluded Palestine from Arab control and did not allow the formation of an independent Arab state that included it. Chaim Weizmann's efforts to build British support for the Zionist movement would eventually secure the Balfour Declaration, a public statement issued by the British government in 1917 during the First World War announcing support for the establishment of a "national home for the Jewish people" in Palestine. In July 1920, the short-lived Arab Kingdom of Syria, with Emir Faisal (one of the leaders of the Arab revolt) as king and tolerated by Britain, was crushed by French armed forces, equipped with modern artillery.

While there was a significant wave of Jewish immigration in the late 19th century, it was not until the arrival of more ideologically Zionist immigrants in the decade preceding the First World War that the landscape of Ottoman Palestine would start to significantly change. Jewish land purchases and the eviction of tenant Arab peasants would contribute to the Palestinian population's growing fear of territorial displacement and dispossession in this period, as would armed confrontations in later years. From early on, some in Zionist movement had the idea of "transferring" the Arab Palestinian population out of the land of a future Jewish state.

According to the political scientist Norman Finkelstein, population transfer was considered as an acceptable solution to the problems of ethnic conflict until around World War II and even for a time afterward. Transfer was considered a drastic but "often necessary" means to end an ethnic conflict or ethnic civil war. In modern times, transfer is often seen as a euphemism for ethnic cleansing.

The idea of transfer gained support of the Zionist leadership after it was proposed by the British Peel Commission. Zionist leaders advocated this for the purpose of establishing a Jewish demographic majority or as a response to violence. Israeli historian Benny Morris wrote in 2004 that the idea of transfer was "inevitable and inbuilt into Zionism". He clarified in 2008 that it "had not been part of the original Zionist ideology" but was advocated for starting in the mid-1930s in response to the violence of the Arab Revolt. There were Arabs that feared displacement as early as the 1880s with one Zionist writing that he had been accused of coming "to drive them out."

=== 1920s ===
With the creation of the British Mandate in Palestine after the end of the first world war, large-scale Jewish immigration began accompanied by the development of a separate Jewish-controlled sector of the economy supported by foreign capital. The British colonial government in Mandatory Palestine recognized the Zionist organizations as legitimate and representative self-governing institutions of the Jewish population. These organizations created the structure of a quasi state. Chief among them was the Jewish Agency for Palestine (renamed the Jewish Agency for Israel after 1948), which would turn into the government of the local Jewish community. It was originally established in 1908 as the Palestine Office of the Zionist Organization (now the World Zionist Organization). Britain and the League of Nations gave it semi-official diplomatic status which increased the international legitimacy of it and by extension the Zionist movement. The Mandate for Palestine recognized the Jewish Agency "as a public body for the purpose of advising and cooperating with the Administration of Palestine." It was also entitled to diplomatic representation in the League of Nations Permanent Mandates Commission in Geneva, London and elsewhere.

There is agreement between Israeli historian Benny Morris and Palestinian historian Rashid Khalidi that the Arab community didn't have same level of governance and recognition, but there is disagreement as to why. Khalid believes the British colonial government did not similarly recognize the Arab majority in Palestine, which it referred to at times as "non-Jewish communities," and which did not have their own international recognition and that they referred to the Palestine Arab Congress as unrepresentative. Morris believes Palestine's Arabs in this period were characterized by a "vying coalition of clans" that setup "political parties" for "form's sake."

Amin al-Husseini, was appointed as Grand Mufti of Jerusalem by British High Commissioner Herbert Samuel. Husseini immediately marked the Jewish national movement and Jewish immigration to Palestine as the enemies of his cause. He initiated large-scale riots against the Jews as early as 1920 in Jerusalem, and in 1921 in Jaffa. Among the results of this violence was the establishment of the Haganah Jewish paramilitary force. In 1929 a further series of violent riots resulted in the deaths of 133 Jews and 116 Arabs, with significant Jewish casualties in Hebron and Safed, and the evacuation of Jews from Hebron and Gaza. Alongside political unrest, rural Palestine in the Mandate era experienced demographic and agricultural expansion. Large villages such as Lajjun and Hamama grew in size, reclaimed marginal lands, and integrated into regional markets, reflecting the resilience and transformation of the Palestinian countryside during this period.

=== 1936–1939 Arab revolt ===
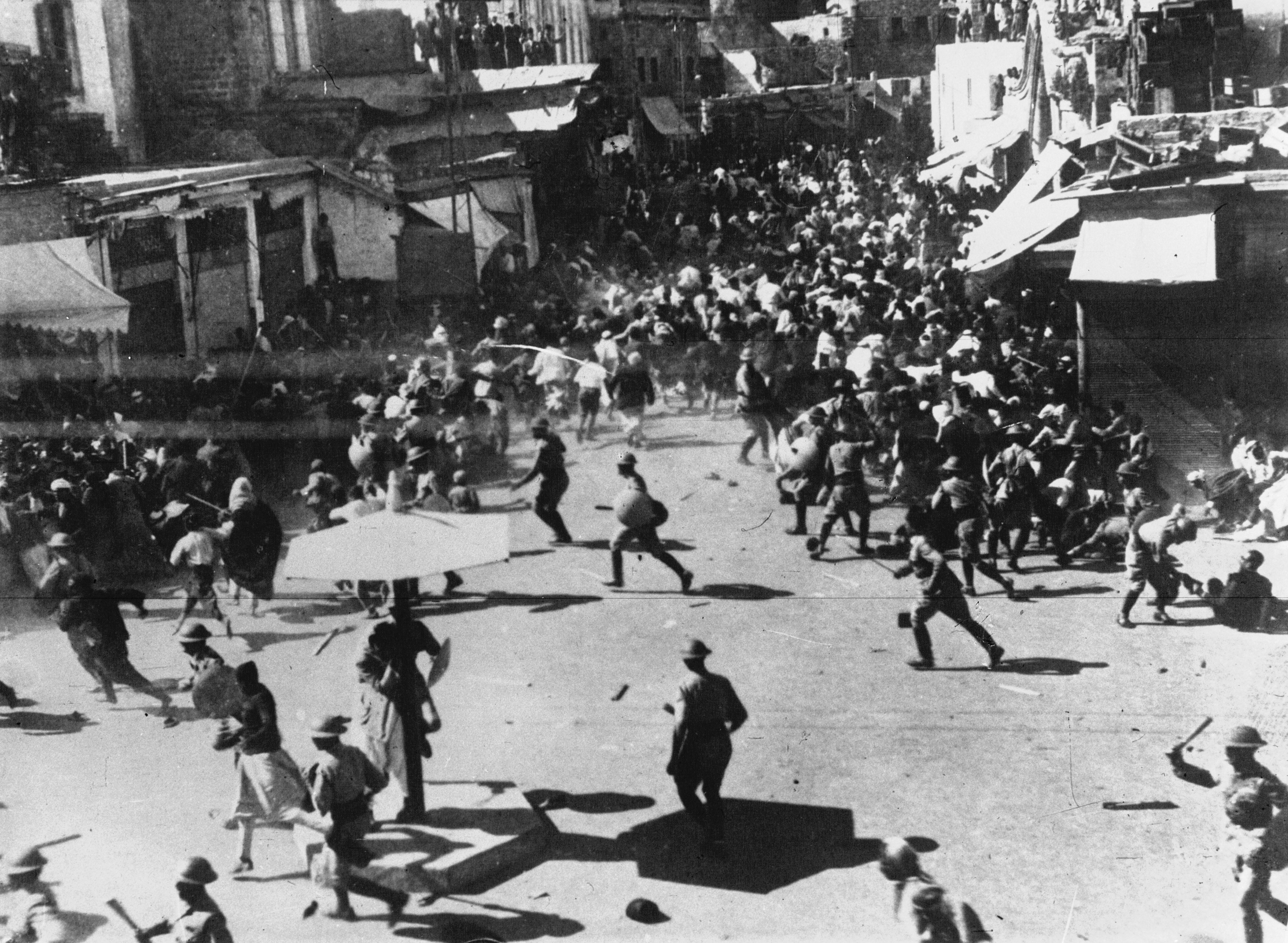
British colonial Palestine Police Force dispersing a crowd in the Jaffa riots, seen as the start of the Arab revolt (1936–1939) in Palestine against British rule and the mass Jewish immigration and rapid expansion of Jewish settlements it allowed.

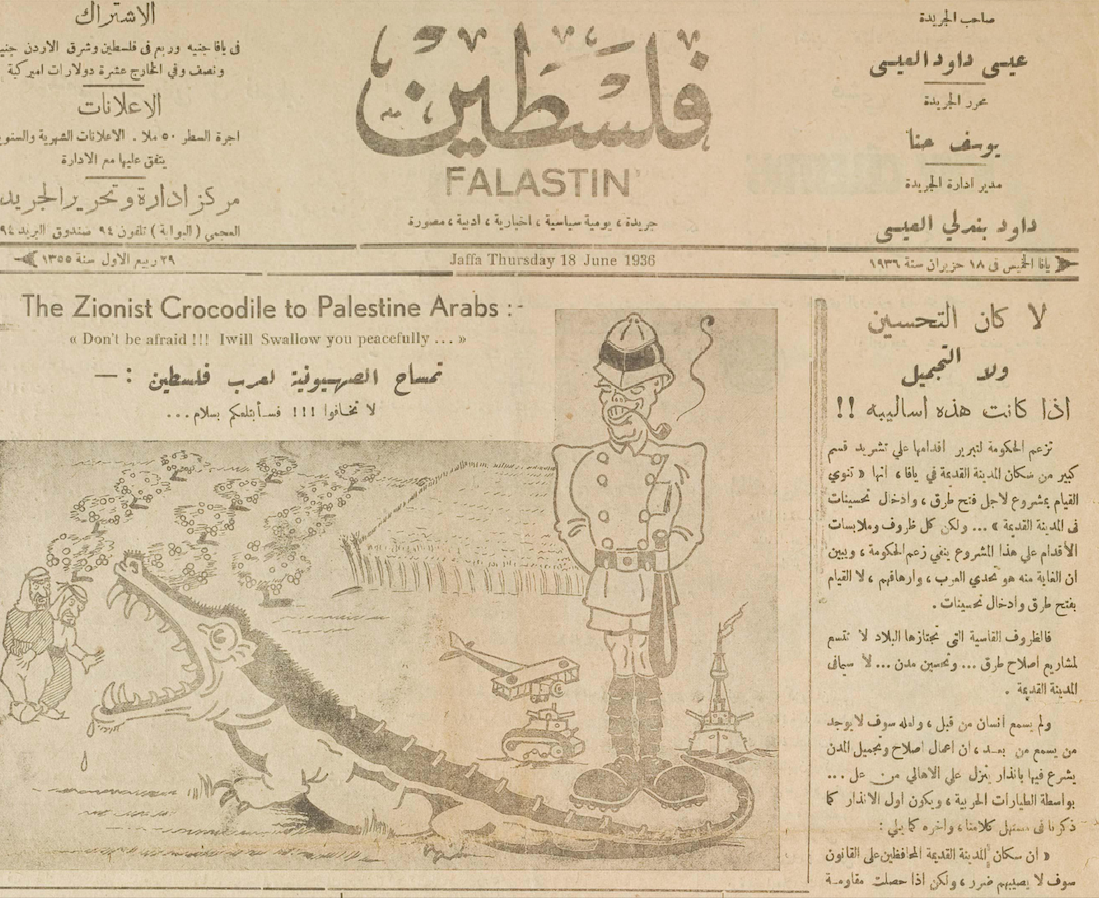
Palestinian Arab-Christian-owned newspaper Falastin, 18 June 1936, caricatured Zionism as a crocodile, protected by a British officer, telling Palestinian Arabs: "Don't be afraid! I will swallow you peacefully..."

The peasant-led popular uprising was a national struggle of Palestinian Arabs against British rule and against the rapid expansion of Jewish settlements that it allowed. It occurred during a peak in the influx of European Jewish immigrants, as rural fellahin faced growing plight and land dispossession, contributing to rural flight and urbanization, which eroded traditional social bonds and failed to alleviate the peasants' abject poverty. (Note: 'While the majority of Palestinian fallāḥīn were dependent on bonds of "patrimonialism and elite parochialism" with notable families, these bonds weakened with urbanization as a'yān (the Palestinian notable class) abetted, or were incapable of stopping, land sales and dispossessions.')

In the early 1930s, the Arab national struggle in Palestine had drawn many Arab nationalist militants from across the Middle East, such as Sheikh Izz ad-Din al-Qassam from Syria, who established the Black Hand militant group and had prepared the grounds for the 1936–1939 Arab revolt in Palestine. Following the death of al-Qassam at the hands of the British in late 1935, tensions erupted in 1936 into the Arab general strike and general boycott. The strike soon deteriorated into violence, and the Arab revolt was repressed by the British armed forces with assistance from auxiliary units of the Palestine Police Force (the Jewish Settlement Police, the Jewish Supernumerary Police, and the Special Night Squads). Palestinian historian Rashid Khalidi estimates suppression of the revolt left at least 10% of the adult male population killed, wounded, imprisoned or exiled. Other estimates of deaths caused by suppression of the revolt are lower, with official British figures and several Israeli historians viewing many of the Arab deaths in this period as attributable to other causes. Between the expulsion of much of the Arab leadership and the weakening of the economy, the Palestinians would struggle to confront the growing Zionist movement.

The cost and risks associated with the revolt and the ongoing inter-communal conflict led to a shift in British policies in the region and the appointment of the Peel Commission which recommended creation of a small Jewish country, which the two main Zionist leaders, Chaim Weizmann and David Ben-Gurion, accepted. Both of their writings indicated they thought that if they accepted a small state it would expand later. The subsequent White Paper of 1939, which rejected a Jewish state and sought to limit Jewish immigration to the region, was the breaking point in relations between British authorities and the Zionist movement.

=== 1940–1947 ===
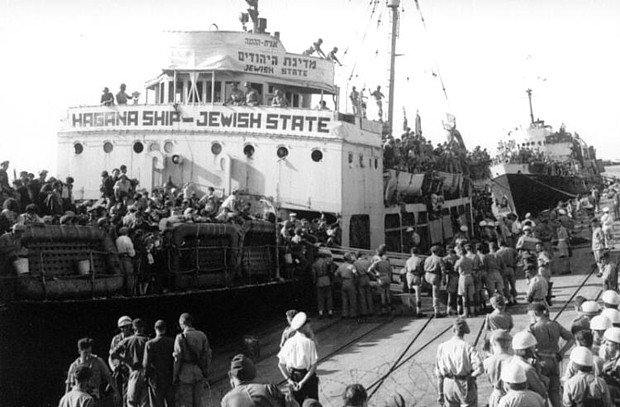
Haganah ship Jewish State carrying illegal Jewish immigrants from Europe at the Haifa Port, Mandatory Palestine, 1947

Renewed violence, which continued sporadically until the beginning of World War II, ended with around 5,000 casualties on the Arab side and 700 casualties combined on the British and Jewish sides in total. With the eruption of World War II, the situation in Mandatory Palestine calmed down. In this period, there was a shift towards a more moderate stance among Palestinian Arabs under the leadership of the Nashashibi clan. Even a joint Jewish–Arab Palestine Regiment was established, under British command, that fought against Nazi German troops in North Africa. The more radical exiled al-Husseini faction, however, tended to cooperate with Nazi Germany. It participated in the establishment of pro-Nazi propaganda machinery throughout the Arab world. The defeat of Arab nationalists in Iraq and subsequent relocation of al-Husseini to Nazi-occupied Europe tied his hands regarding field operations in Palestine, though he regularly demanded that the Italians and the Germans bomb Tel Aviv. The Jewish Agency for Palestine and Palestinian National Defense Party called on Palestine's Jewish and Arab youths to volunteer for the British Army. 30,000 Palestinian Jews and 12,000 Palestinian Arabs enlisted in the British armed forces during the war, while a Jewish Brigade was created in 1944.

By the end of World War II, a crisis over the fate of Holocaust survivors from Europe led to renewed tensions between the Yishuv and Mandate authorities. By 1944, Jewish groups began to conduct military-style operations against the British, with the aim of persuading Great Britain to accept the formation of a Jewish state. This culminated in the Jewish insurgency in Mandatory Palestine. The sustained Zionist paramilitary campaign against the British authorities, along with diplomatic damage and worldwide negative publicity from treating Jewish refugees as illegal immigrants, were major factors in the British decision to leave. To decide what to do next, the United Nations Special Committee on Palestine was established which recommended partition and the End of the British Mandate for Palestine.

=== The 1948 Palestine war (Israel's War of Independence) and the Nakba ===
Clickable map of Mandatory Palestine with the depopulated locations during the 1948 Palestine war (red - Arab, blue - Jewish)	The Green Line borders of Israel as established by the 1949 Armistice Agreements at the conclusion of the 1948 war.

The 1948 Palestine war refers to the first stage 1947–1948 civil war in Mandatory Palestine and the second stage 1948 Arab–Israeli War. Those referring to the 1948 Arab–Israeli War may also be including the preceding civil war.

==== 1947 United Nations partition plan and civil war ====
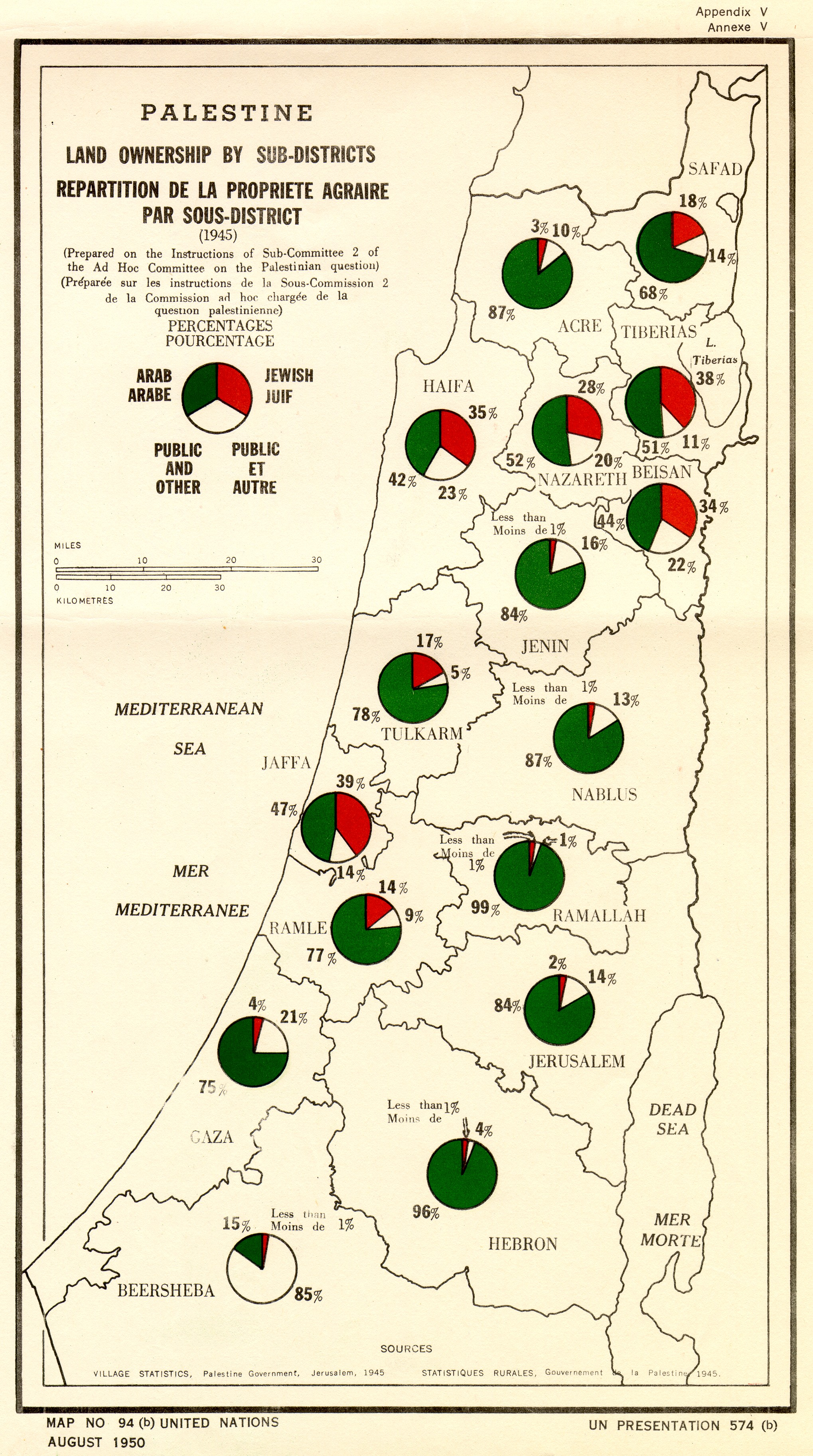
Distribution of Palestine land ownership in 1945

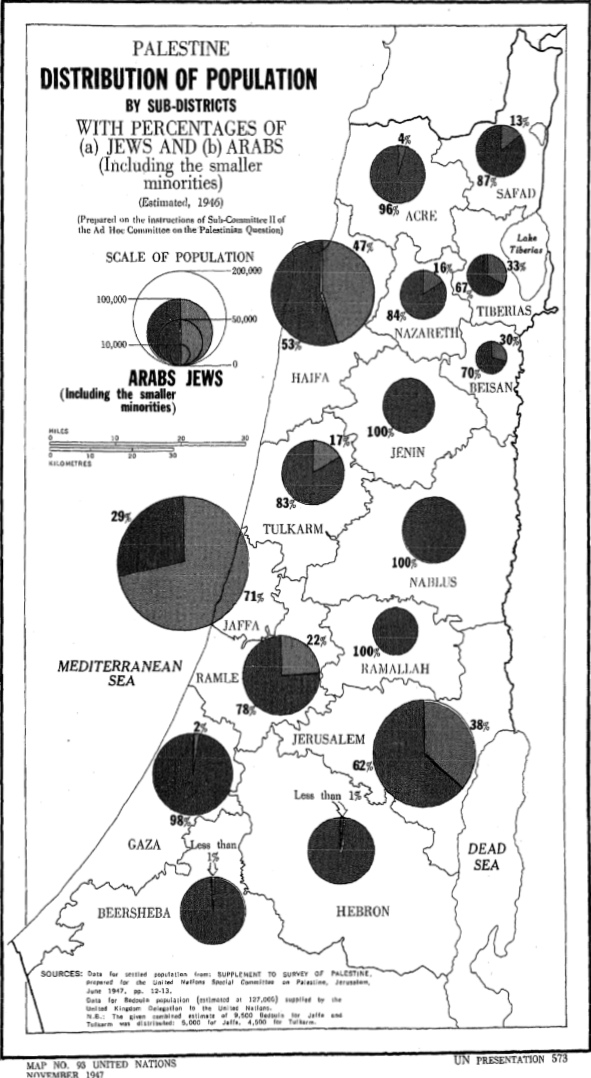
Population distribution in Palestine in 1947

Two maps reviewed by the United Nations in considering partition, including estimates of the region demographics.

On 29 November 1947, the General Assembly of the United Nations adopted Resolution 181(II) that recommending the adoption and implementation of a plan to partition Palestine into an Arab state, a Jewish state and an international City of Jerusalem. Palestinian Arabs were opposed to the partition. The Yishuv accepted the partition but began to think in terms of expanding Israel's borders beyond what was allocated to it by the UN. One leader said they would capture more territory if a war was launched against them. On the next day, Palestine was swept by violence, igniting 1947–1948 civil war in Mandatory Palestine, the first phase of the 1948 Palestine war. For four months, under continuous Arab provocation and attack, the Yishuv was usually on the defensive while occasionally retaliating. The Arab League helped the Palestinian Arabs' struggle by forming the volunteer-based Arab Liberation Army and supporting the Palestinian Arab Holy War Army, under the leadership of Abd al-Qadir al-Husayni and Hasan Salama. On the Jewish side, the civil war was managed by the major underground militias – the Haganah, Irgun and Lehi – strengthened by numerous Jewish veterans of World War II and foreign volunteers. By spring 1948, it was already clear that the Arab forces were nearing a total collapse, while Yishuv forces gained more and more territory, creating a large scale refugee problem of Palestinian Arabs.

==== 1948 Arab–Israeli War ====
Following the end of the British Mandate and the Declaration of the Establishment of the State of Israel on 14 May 1948, the Arab League decided to intervene on behalf of the Palestinian Arabs. They marched their forces into the former British Palestine, beginning the 1948 Arab–Israeli War. The overall fighting, leading to around 15,000 casualties, resulted in cease-fire and armistice agreements of 1949, with Israel holding much of the former Mandate territory, Jordan occupying and later annexing the West Bank and Egypt taking over the Gaza Strip, where the All-Palestine Government was declared by the Arab League on 23 September 1948. The 1947–1948 civil war in Mandatory Palestine and 1948 Arab-Israeli War resulted in the ethnic cleansing of 750,000 Palestinian Arabs. In 1950, Israel passed the Law of Return, which allowed Jews and their spouses to become citizens with voting rights, even if they had never lived there before.

=== 1956 Suez Crisis ===
Through the 1950s, Jordan and Egypt supported the Palestinian Fedayeen militants' cross-border attacks into Israel, while Israel carried out its own reprisal operations in the host countries. The 1956 Suez Crisis resulted in a short-term Israeli occupation of the Gaza Strip and exile of the All-Palestine Government, which was later restored with Israeli withdrawal. The All-Palestine Government was completely abandoned by Egypt in 1959 and was officially merged into the United Arab Republic, to the detriment of the Palestinian national movement. Gaza Strip then was put under the authority of the Egyptian military administrator, making it a de facto military occupation. In 1964, however, a new organization, the Palestine Liberation Organization (PLO), was established by Yasser Arafat. It immediately won the support of most Arab League governments and was granted a seat in the Arab League.

=== 1967 Six-Day War ===
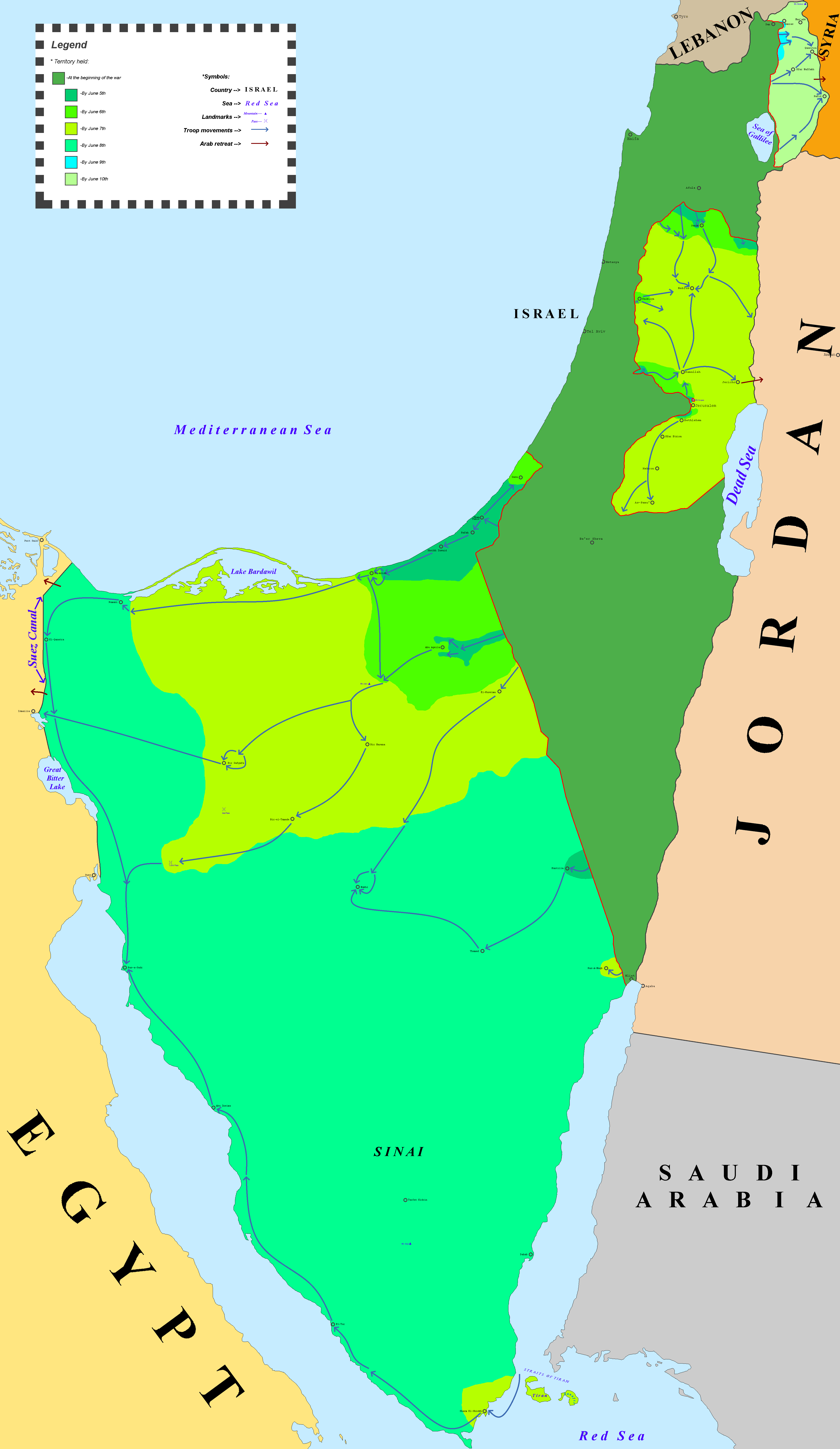
During the Six-Day War in 1967, Israel captured the West Bank, the Gaza Strip, the Golan Heights and the Sinai Peninsula. Each of these territories except the Sinai remain under Israeli occupation.

In the 1967 Arab-Israel War, Israel occupied the Palestinian West Bank, East Jerusalem, Gaza Strip, Egyptian Sinai, Syrian Golan Heights, and two islands in the Gulf of Aqaba.

The war exerted a significant effect upon Palestinian nationalism, as the PLO was unable to establish any control on the ground and ultimately established its headquarters in Jordan, from where it supported the Jordanian army during the War of Attrition. However, the Palestinian base in Jordan collapsed with the Jordanian–Palestinian civil war in 1970, after which the PLO was forced to relocate to South Lebanon.

The 1967 war represented the conflict's largest single territorial change, and by the mid-1970s, the territorial changes spurred an international preference for land-based conflict resolution frameworks involving the establishment of an independent Palestinian state in the West Bank and Gaza. This "land for peace" proposal was endorsed by the ICJ and UN.

=== 1973 Yom Kippur War ===
On 6 October 1973, a coalition of Arab forces consisting of mainly Egypt and Syria launched a surprise attack against Israel on the Jewish holy day of Yom Kippur. Despite this, the war concluded with an Israeli victory, with both sides suffering tremendous casualties.

Following the end of the war, the UN Security Council passed Resolution 338 confirming the land-for-peace principle established in Resolution 242, initiating the Middle East peace process. The Arab defeat would play an important role in the PLO's willingness to pursue a negotiated settlement to the conflict, while many Israelis began to believe that the area under Israeli occupation could not be held indefinitely by force.

The Camp David Accords, agreed upon by Israel and Egypt in 1978, primarily aimed to establish a peace treaty between the two countries. The accords also proposed the creation of a "Self-Governing Authority" for the Arab population in the West Bank and Gaza Strip, excluding Jerusalem, under Israeli control. A peace treaty based on these accords was signed in 1979, leading to Israel's withdrawal from the occupied Egyptian Sinai Peninsula by 1982.

=== 1982 Lebanon War ===
During the Lebanese Civil War, Palestinian militants continued to launch attacks against Israel while also battling opponents within Lebanon. In 1978, the Coastal Road massacre led to the Israeli full-scale invasion known as Operation Litani. This operation sought to dislodge the PLO from Lebanon while expanding the area under the control of the Israeli allied Christian militias in southern Lebanon. The operation succeeded in leaving a large portion of the south in control of the Israeli proxy which would eventually form the South Lebanon Army. Under United States pressure, Israeli forces would eventually withdraw from Lebanon.

In 1982, Israel, having secured its southern border with Egypt, sought to resolve the Palestinian issue by attempting to dismantle the military and political power of the PLO in Lebanon. The goal was to establish a friendly regime in Lebanon and continue its policy of settlement and annexation in occupied Palestine. The PLO had observed the latest ceasefire with Israel and shown a preference for negotiations over military operations. As a result, Israel sought to remove the PLO as a potential negotiating partner. Most Palestinian militants were defeated within several weeks, Beirut was captured, and the PLO headquarters were evacuated to Tunisia in August by Yasser Arafat's decision.

=== First Intifada (1987–1993) ===
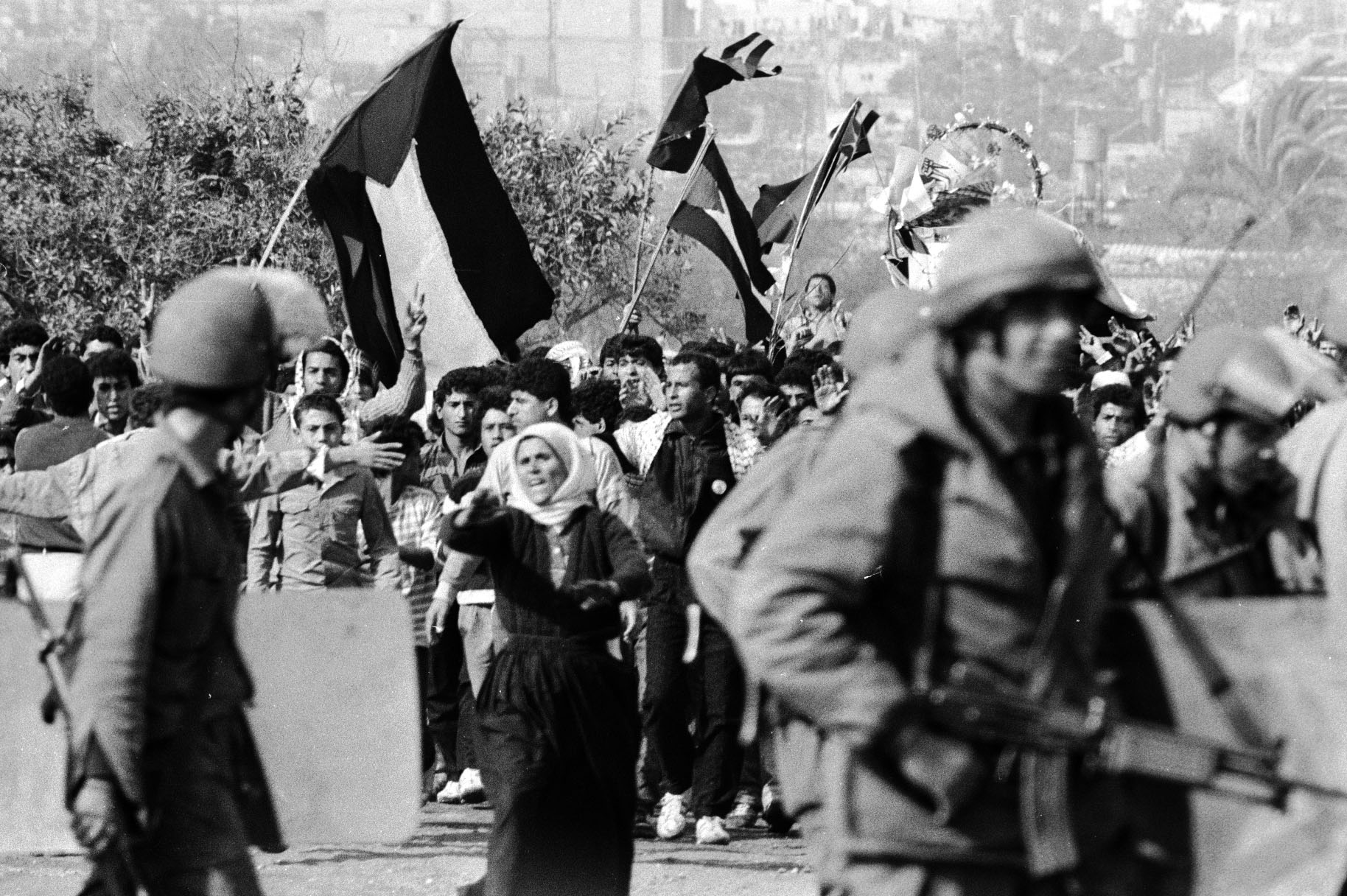
Protests in the Gaza Strip in the early days of the First Intifada in 1987.

For causes that are not agreed on beyond political frustration, the first Palestinian uprising began in 1987. Palestinian historian Rashid Khalidi compares it to the 1936-1939 Arab Revolt. He views it as a grassroots popular protest that started in response to a collision involving an Israeli army vehicle and also as a result of the suppression of the Palestinian national movement. He points to the large involvement of youth and women taking leadership roles in normally male dominated politics, to illustrate its popularity. American political scientist Mary King believes it was a response to Israel's military occupation, escalating attacks on Palestinians, and policies of settlement building and collective punishment and that uprising largely consisted of nonviolent acts of civil disobedience and protest. Israeli historian Benny Morris points to the death of an Arab schoolgirl and the wounding of two others by stay bullets in the preceding weeks as well as a rising numbers of clashes in the preceding years. He views the Intifada as largely unarmed rather than nonviolent, noting the use of knives and other improvised weapons, as well as the hundreds of casualties in the first month.

By the early 1990s, the conflict, termed the First Intifada, was the focus of international settlement efforts, in part motivated by the success of the Egyptian–Israeli peace treaty of 1982. Eventually the Israeli–Palestinian peace process led to the Oslo Accords of 1993, allowing the PLO to relocate from Tunisia and take ground in the West Bank and Gaza Strip, establishing the Palestinian National Authority. The peace process also had significant opposition among elements of Palestinian society, such as Hamas and Palestinian Islamic Jihad, who immediately initiated a campaign of attacks targeting Israelis. Following hundreds of casualties and a wave of anti-government propaganda, Israeli Prime Minister Rabin was assassinated by an Israeli far-right extremist who objected to the peace initiative. This struck a serious blow to the peace process, which in 1996 led to the newly elected government of Israel backing off from the process, to some degree.

=== Second Intifada (2000–2005) ===
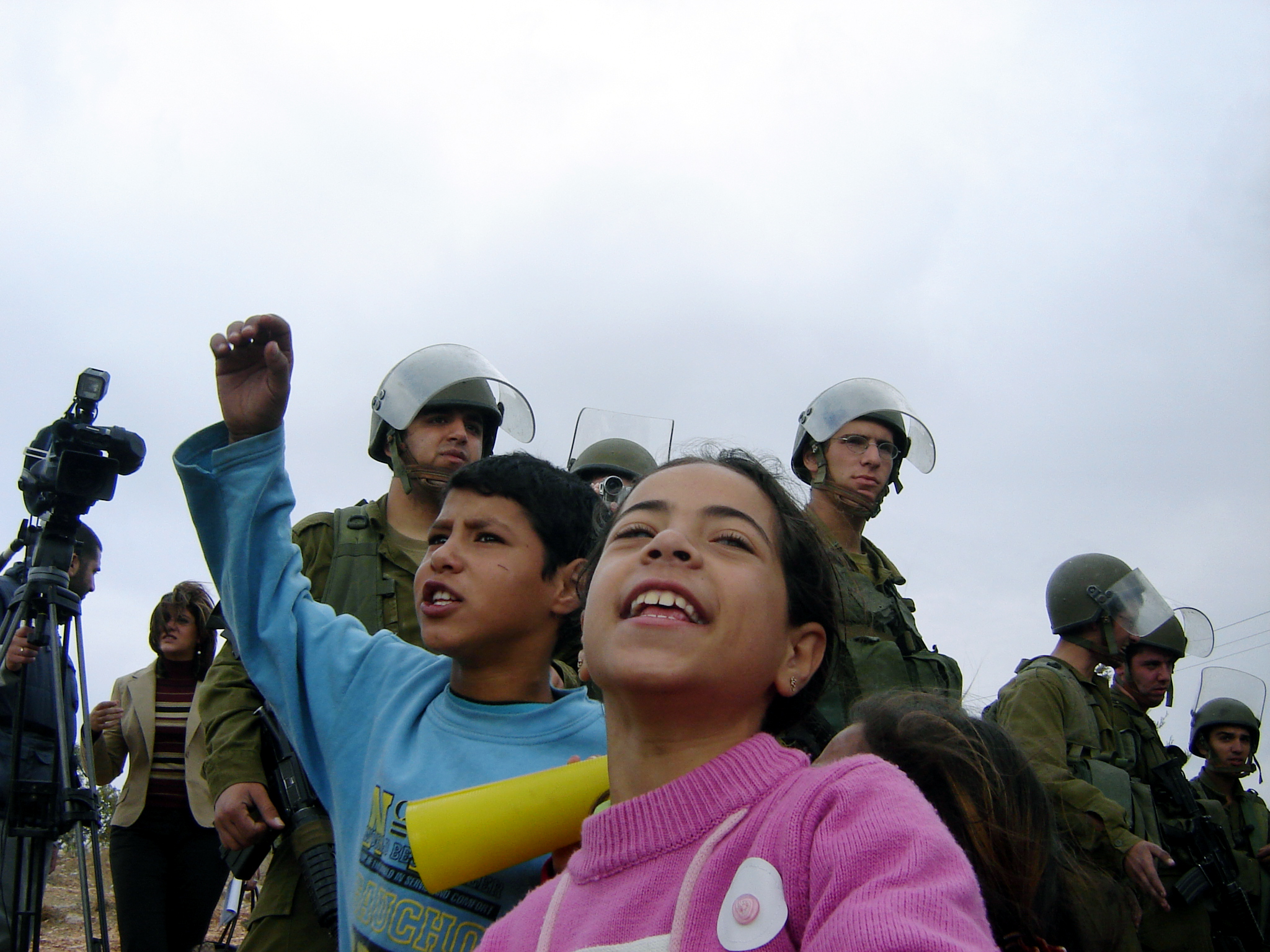
Demonstrations against the construction of the West Bank separation barrier in the city of Bil'in, occupied West Bank, in 2005 during the Second Intifada.

Following several years of unsuccessful negotiations, the conflict re-erupted as the Second Intifada in September 2000. The violence, escalating into an open conflict between the Palestinian National Security Forces and the Israel Defense Forces, lasted until 2004/2005 and led to thousands of fatalities. In 2005, Israeli Prime Minister Sharon ordered the removal of Israeli settlers and soldiers from Gaza. Israel and its Supreme Court formally declared an end to occupation, saying it "had no effective control over what occurred" in Gaza. However, the United Nations, Human Rights Watch and many other international bodies and NGOs continue to consider Israel to be the occupying power of the Gaza Strip as Israel controls Gaza Strip's airspace, territorial waters and controls the movement of people or goods in or out of Gaza by air or sea.

=== Fatah–Hamas split (2006–2007) ===
In 2006, Hamas won a plurality of 44% in the Palestinian parliamentary election. Israel responded it would begin economic sanctions unless Hamas agreed to accept prior Israeli–Palestinian agreements, forswear violence, and recognize Israel's right to exist, all of which Hamas rejected. After internal Palestinian political struggle between Fatah and Hamas erupted into the 2007 Battle of Gaza, Hamas took full control of the area. In 2007, Israel imposed a naval blockade on the Gaza Strip, and cooperation with Egypt allowed a ground blockade of the Egyptian border.

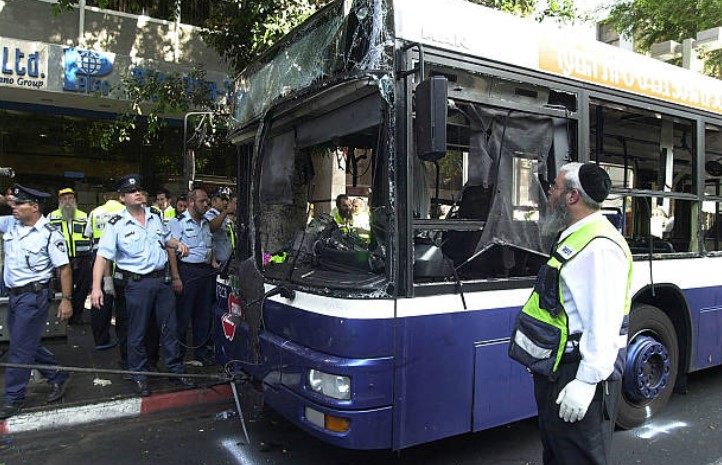
Aftermath of a Hamas suicide bombing on a bus in Tel Aviv.

The tensions between Israel and Hamas escalated until late 2008, when Israel launched operation Cast Lead upon Gaza, resulting in thousands of civilian casualties and billions of dollars in damage. By February 2009, a ceasefire was signed with international mediation between the parties, though the occupation and small and sporadic eruptions of violence continued.

In 2011, a Palestinian Authority attempt to gain UN membership as a fully sovereign state failed. In Hamas-controlled Gaza, sporadic rocket attacks on Israel and Israeli air raids continued to occur. In November 2012, Palestinian representation in the UN was upgraded to a non-member observer state, and its mission title was changed from "Palestine (represented by PLO)" to "State of Palestine". In 2014, another war broke out between Israel and Gaza, resulting in over 70 Israeli and over 2,000 Palestinian casualties.

=== Gaza war (2023–present) ===
Map of the Gaza war in Gaza and southern Israel

After the 2014 war and 2021 crisis, Hamas began planning an attack on Israel. In 2022, Netanyahu returned to power while headlining a hardline far-right government, which led to greater political strife in Israel and clashes in the Palestinian territories. A surprise attack was launched by Hamas-led militant groups on southern Israel from the Gaza Strip on 7 October 2023, in which more than 1,195 Israeli civilians, military personnel, and other foreign nationals were killed, and 251 were taken hostage into Gaza. The Israeli military responded by declaring war on Hamas and conducting an extensive aerial bombardment campaign on Gaza, followed by a large-scale ground invasion with the stated goal of destroying Hamas, freeing hostages, and controlling security in Gaza afterwards. South Africa accused Israel of genocide at the International Court of Justice and called for an immediate ceasefire. The court issued an order directing Israel to take all measures to prevent any acts contrary to the 1948 Genocide Convention, but did not order Israel to suspend its military campaign.

The war spilled over the Middle East, with Israel engaging in clashes with local militias in the West Bank, Hezbollah in Lebanon and northern Israel, and other Iranian-backed militias in Syria. Israel and the United States have also engaged with Iran itself, first in the Twelve-Day War in 2025 and again in the 2026 Iran war. Iranian-backed militias engaged in clashes with the United States, while the Houthis blockaded the Red Sea in protest, to which the United States responded with airstrikes in Yemen, Iraq, and Syria. Taking advantage of the weakening position of Iranian-backed militias, Syrian opposition groups initiated an offensive in November 2024 that reignited the Syrian civil war, culminating in the fall of the Assad regime and the establishment of a transitional government in the place of the former Ba'athist government; Israel invaded the area around its demarcated boundaries with Syria shortly afterwards.

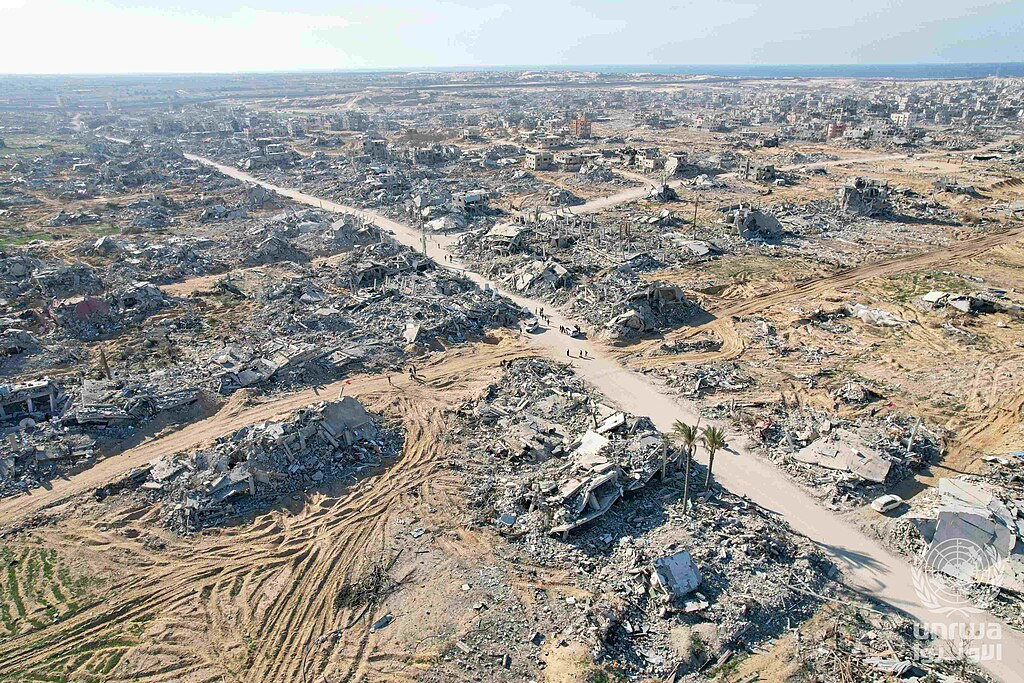
Destruction of Rafah in January 2025

The war has caused widespread destruction, a humanitarian crisis, and an ongoing famine in the Gaza Strip, while most of the population was forcibly displaced. Various human rights organizations and scholars of genocide studies and international law have concluded that Israel's actions in Gaza constitute genocide, though others dispute this. Over 70,000 Palestinians in Gaza have been killed, almost half of them women and children, and more than 148,000 have been injured. A study in The Lancet estimated 64,260 deaths in Gaza from traumatic injuries by June 2024, while noting a potentially larger death toll when "indirect" deaths are included. As of May 2025, a comparable figure for traumatic injury deaths would be 93,000.

A ceasefire has de jure been in effect since 10 October 2025 as part of a peace plan. The last remaining living Israeli hostages were returned that month, and the last body was recovered in January 2026. However, limited warfare in Gaza has continued as of September 2026.

== Attempts to reach a peaceful settlement ==
The PLO's participation in diplomatic negotiations was dependent on its complete disavowal of terrorism and recognition of Israel's "right to exist." This stipulation required the PLO to abandon its objective of reclaiming all of historic Palestine and instead focus on the 22 percent which came under Israeli military control in 1967. By the late 1970s, Palestinian leadership in the occupied territories and most Arab states supported a two-state settlement. In 1981, Saudi Arabia put forward a plan based on a two-state settlement to the conflict with support from the Arab League. Israeli analyst Avner Yaniv describes Arafat as ready to make a historic compromise at this time, while the Israeli cabinet continued to oppose the existence of a Palestinian state. Yaniv described Arafat's willingness to compromise as a "peace offensive" which Israel responded to by planning to remove the PLO as a potential negotiating partner in order to evade international diplomatic pressure. Israel would invade Lebanon the following year in an attempt to undermine the PLO as a political organization, weakening Palestinian nationalism and facilitating the annexation of the West Bank into Greater Israel.

While the PLO had adopted a program of pursuing a Palestinian state alongside Israel since the mid-1970s, the 1988 Palestinian Declaration of Independence formally consecrated this objective. This declaration, which was based on resolutions from the Palestine National Council sessions in the late 1970s and 1980s, advocated for the creation of a Palestinian state comprising the West Bank, Gaza Strip, and East Jerusalem, within the borders set by the 1949 armistice lines prior to 5 June 1967. Following the declaration, Arafat explicitly denounced all forms of terrorism and affirmed the PLO's acceptance of UN Resolutions 242 and 338, as well as the recognition of Israel's right to exist. All the conditions defined by Henry Kissinger for US negotiations with the PLO had now been met.

Then-Israeli prime minister Yitzhak Shamir stood behind the stance that the PLO was a terrorist organization. He maintained a strict stance against any concessions, including withdrawal from occupied Palestinian territories, recognition of or negotiations with the PLO, and especially the establishment of a Palestinian state. Shamir viewed the U.S. decision to engage in dialogue with the PLO as a mistake that threatened the existing territorial status quo. He argued that negotiating with the PLO meant accepting the existence of a Palestinian state and hence was unacceptable.

=== The peace process ===
The term "peace process" refers to the step-by-step approach to resolving the conflict. Having originally entered into usage to describe the US mediated negotiations between Israel and surrounding Arab countries, notably Egypt, the term "peace-process" has grown to be associated with an emphasis on the negotiation process rather than on presenting a comprehensive solution to the conflict. As part of this process, fundamental issues of the Israeli–Palestinian conflict such as borders, access to resources, and the Palestinian right of return, have been left to "final status" talks. Such "final status" negotiations along the lines discussed in Madrid in 1991 have never taken place.

The Oslo Accords of 1993 and 1995 built on the incremental framework put in place by the 1978 Camp David negotiations and the 1991 Madrid and Washington talks. The motivation behind the incremental approach towards a settlement was that it would "build confidence", but the eventual outcome was instead a dramatic decline in mutual confidence. At each incremental stage, Israel further entrenched its occupation of the Palestinian territories, despite the PA upholding its obligation to curbing violent attacks from extremist groups, in part by cooperating with Israeli forces.

Meron Benvenisti, former deputy mayor of Jerusalem, observed that life became harsher for Palestinians during this period as state violence increased and Palestinian land continued to be expropriated as settlements expanded. Israeli foreign minister Shlomo Ben-Ami described the Oslo Accords as legitimizing "the transformation of the West Bank into what has been called a 'cartographic cheeseboard'."

==== Creation of the Palestinian Authority and security cooperation ====
Core to the Oslo Accords was the creation of the Palestinian Authority and the security cooperation it would enter into with the Israeli military authorities in what has been described as the "outsourcing" of the occupation to the PA. Just before signing the Oslo accord, Rabin described the expectation that the "Palestinians will be better at establishing internal security than we were, because they will allow no appeals to the Supreme Court and will prevent [human rights groups] from criticizing the conditions there." Along these lines, Ben-Ami, who participated in the Camp David 2000 talks, described this process: "One of the meanings of Oslo was that the PLO was eventually Israel's collaborator in the task of stifling the Intifada and cutting short what was clearly an authentically democratic struggle for Palestinian independence."

The Wye River Memorandum agreed on by the PA and Israel introduced a "zero tolerance" policy for "terror and violence." This policy was uniformly criticized by human rights organizations for its "encouragement" of human rights abuses. Dennis Ross describes the Wye as having successfully reduced both violent and non-violent protests, both of which he considers to be "inconsistent with the spirit of Wye." Watson claims that the PA frequently violated its obligations to curb incitement and its record on curbing terrorism and other security obligations under the Wye River Memorandum was, at best, mixed.

=== Oslo Accords (1993, 1995) ===
A peace movement poster: Israeli and Palestinian flags and the word peace in Arabic and Hebrew

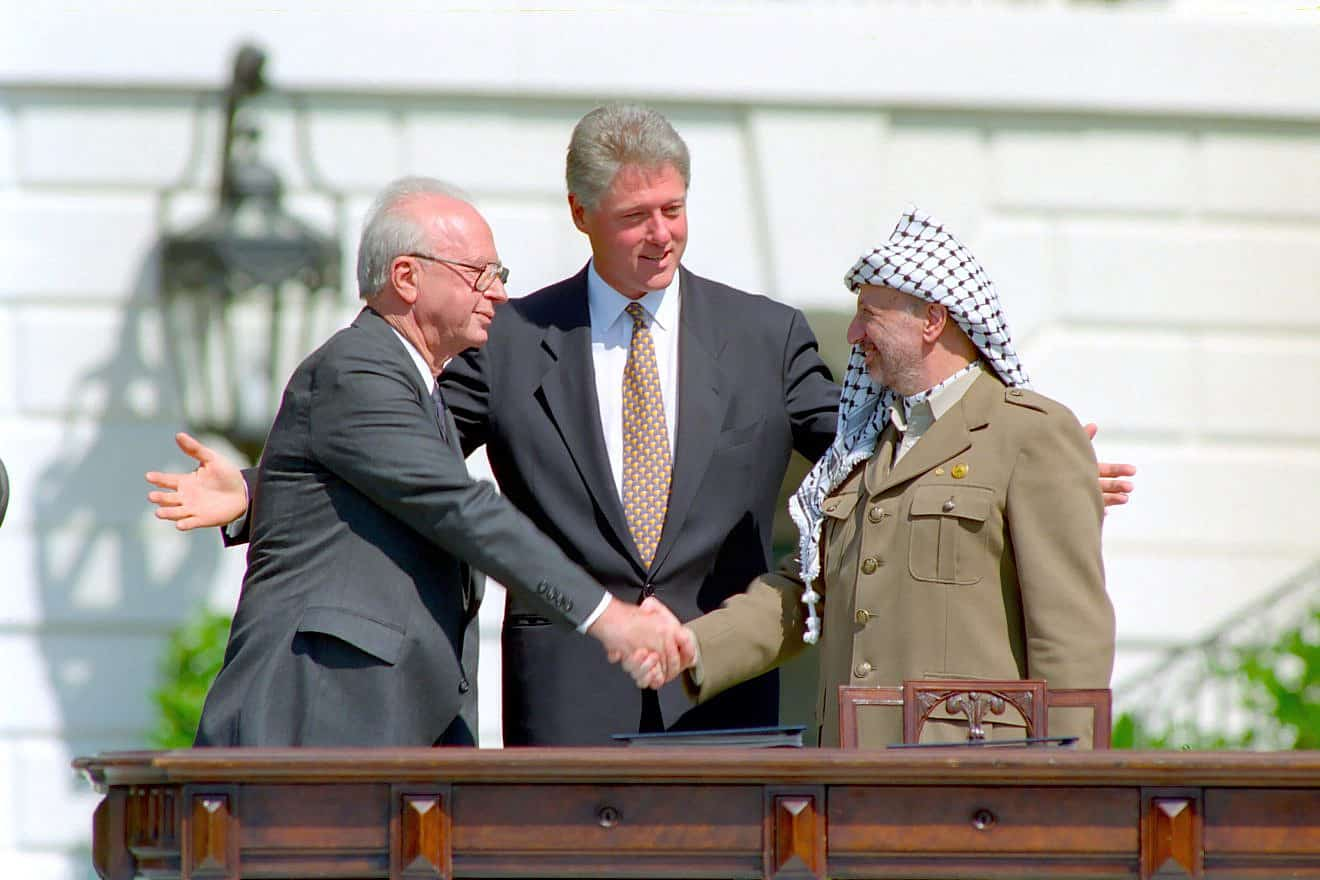
Yitzhak Rabin, Bill Clinton, and Yasser Arafat during the Oslo Accords on 13 September 1993

In 1993, Israeli officials led by Yitzhak Rabin and Palestinian leaders from the Palestine Liberation Organization led by Yasser Arafat strove to find a peaceful solution through what became known as the Oslo peace process. A crucial milestone in this process was Arafat's letter of recognition of Israel's right to exist. Emblematic of the asymmetry in the Oslo process, Israel was not required to, and did not, recognize the right of a Palestinian state to exist. In 1993, the Declaration of Principles (or Oslo I) was signed and set forward a framework for future Israeli–Palestinian negotiations, in which key issues would be left to "final status" talks. The stipulations of the Oslo agreements ran contrary to the international consensus for resolving the conflict; the agreements did not uphold Palestinian self-determination or statehood and repealed the internationally accepted interpretation of UN Resolution 242 that land cannot be acquired by war. With respect to access to land and resources, Noam Chomsky described the Oslo agreements as allowing "Israel to do virtually what it likes." The Oslo process was delicate and progressed in fits and starts.

The process took a turning point at the assassination of Yitzhak Rabin in November 1995 and the election of Netanyahu in 1996, finally unraveling when Arafat and Ehud Barak failed to reach an agreement at Camp David in July 2000 and later at Taba in 2001. The interim period specified by Oslo had not built confidence between the two parties; Barak had failed to implement additional stages of the interim agreements and settlements expanded by 10% during his short term. The disagreement between the two parties at Camp David was primarily on the acceptance (or rejection) of international consensus. For Palestinian negotiators, the international consensus, as represented by the yearly vote in the UN General Assembly which passes almost unanimously, was the starting point for negotiations. The Israeli negotiators, supported by the American participants, did not accept the international consensus as the basis for a settlement. Both sides eventually accepted the Clinton parameters "with reservations" but the talks at Taba were "called to a halt" by Barak, and the peace process itself came to a stand-still. Ben-Ami, who participated in the talks at Camp David as Israel's foreign minister, would later describe the proposal on the table: "The Clinton parameters... are the best proof that Arafat was right to turn down the summit's offers".

=== Camp David Summit (2000) ===
In July 2000, US President Bill Clinton convened a peace summit between Palestinian President Yasser Arafat and Israeli Prime Minister Ehud Barak. Barak reportedly put forward the following as "bases for negotiation", via the US to the Palestinian President: a non-militarized Palestinian state split into 3–4 parts containing 87–92% of the West Bank after having already given up 78% of historic Palestine. (Note: Three factors made Israel's territorial offer less forthcoming than it initially appeared. First, the 91 percent land offer was based on the Israeli definition of the West Bank, but this differs by approximately 5 percentage points from the Palestinian definition. Palestinians use a total area of 5,854 square kilometers. Israel, however, omits the area known as No Man's Land (50 km^{2} near Latrun), post-1967 East Jerusalem (71 km^{2}), and the territorial waters of the Dead Sea (195 km^{2}), which reduces the total to 5,538 km^{2}) Thus, an Israeli offer of 91 percent of the West Bank (5,538 km^{2} of the West Bank translates into only 86 percent from the Palestinian perspective), including Arab parts of East Jerusalem and the entire Gaza Strip, as well as a stipulation that 69 Jewish settlements (which comprise 85% of the West Bank's Jewish settlers) would be ceded to Israel, no right of return to Israel, no sovereignty over the Temple Mount or any core East Jerusalem neighborhoods, and continued Israel control over the Jordan Valley.

Arafat rejected this offer, which Palestinian negotiators, Israeli analysts and Israeli Foreign Minister Shlomo Ben-Ami described as "unacceptable". According to the Palestinian negotiators the offer did not remove many of the elements of the Israeli occupation regarding land, security, settlements, and Jerusalem.

After the Camp David summit, a narrative emerged, supported by Israeli Prime Minister Ehud Barak and his foreign minister Shlomo Ben-Ami, as well as US officials including Dennis Ross and Madeleine Albright, that Yasser Arafat had rejected a generous peace offer from Israel and instead incited a violent uprising. This narrative suggested that Arafat was not interested in a two-state solution, but rather aimed to destroy Israel and take over all of Palestine. This view was widely accepted in US and Israeli public opinion. Nearly all scholars and most Israeli and US officials involved in the negotiations have rejected this narrative. These individuals include prominent Israeli negotiators, the IDF chief of staff, the head of the IDF's intelligence bureau, the head of the Shin Bet as well as their advisors.

No tenable solution was crafted which would satisfy both Israeli and Palestinian demands, even under intense US pressure. Clinton has long blamed Arafat for the collapse of the summit. In the months following the summit, Clinton appointed former US Senator George J. Mitchell to lead a fact-finding committee aiming to identify strategies for restoring the peace process. The committee's findings were published in 2001 with the dismantlement of existing Israeli settlements and Palestinian crackdown on militant activity being one strategy.

=== Developments following Camp David ===
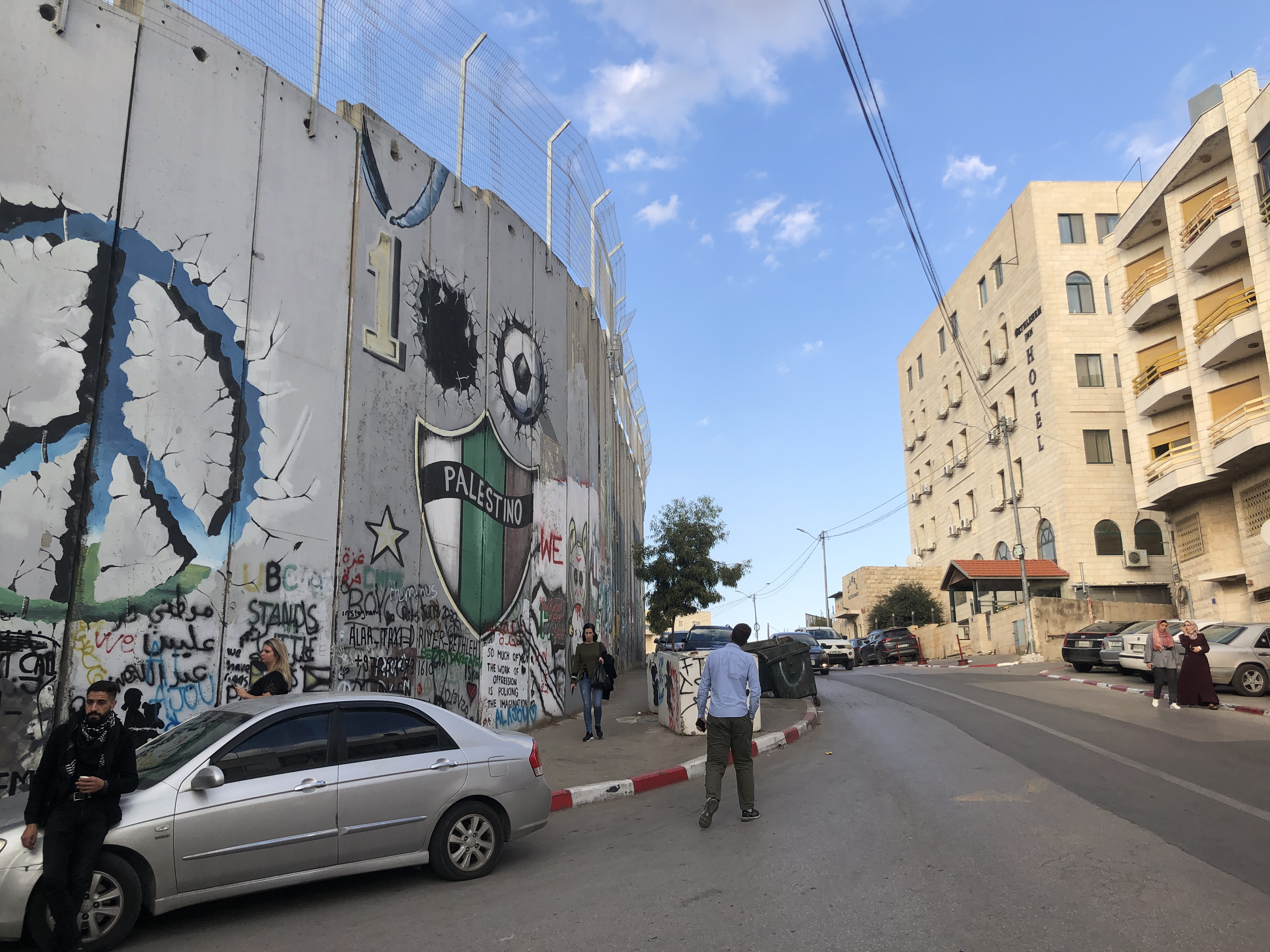
Israeli West Bank barrier in Bethlehem

Following the failed summit Palestinian and Israeli negotiators continued to meet in small groups through August and September 2000 to try to bridge the gaps between their respective positions. The United States prepared its own plan to resolve the outstanding issues. Clinton's presentation of the US proposals was delayed by the advent of the Second Intifada at the end of September.

Clinton's plan, eventually presented on 23 December 2000, proposed the establishment of a sovereign Palestinian state in the Gaza Strip and 94–96 percent of the West Bank plus the equivalent of 1–3 percent of the West Bank in land swaps from pre-1967 Israel. On Jerusalem, the plan stated that "the general principle is that Arab areas are Palestinian and that Jewish areas are Israeli." The holy sites were to be split on the basis that Palestinians would have sovereignty over the Temple Mount/Noble sanctuary, while the Israelis would have sovereignty over the Western Wall. On refugees, the plan suggested a number of proposals including financial compensation, the right of return to the Palestinian state, and Israeli acknowledgment of suffering caused to the Palestinians in 1948. Security proposals referred to a "non-militarized" Palestinian state, and an international force for border security. Both sides accepted Clinton's plan and it became the basis for the negotiations at the Taba Peace summit the following January.

=== Taba Summit (2001) ===
The Israeli negotiation team presented a new map at the Taba Summit in Taba, Egypt, in January 2001. The proposition removed the "temporarily Israeli controlled" areas, and the Palestinian side accepted this as a basis for further negotiation. With Israeli elections looming the talks ended without an agreement but the two sides issued a joint statement attesting to the progress they had made: "The sides declare that they have never been closer to reaching an agreement and it is thus our shared belief that the remaining gaps could be bridged with the resumption of negotiations following the Israeli elections." The following month the Likud party candidate Ariel Sharon defeated Ehud Barak in the Israeli elections and was elected as Israeli prime minister on 7 February 2001. Sharon's new government chose not to resume the high-level talks.

=== Road map for peace (2002–2003) ===
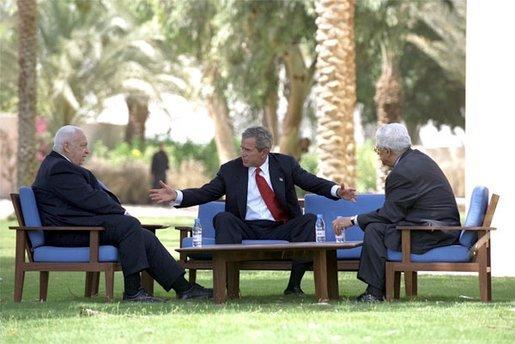
President George W. Bush, center, discusses the peace process with Prime Minister Ariel Sharon of Israel, left, and Palestinian President Mahmoud Abbas in Aqaba, Jordan, 4 June 2003.

One peace proposal, presented by the Quartet of the European Union, Russia, the United Nations and the United States on 17 September 2002, was the Road Map for Peace. This plan did not attempt to resolve difficult questions such as the fate of Jerusalem or Israeli settlements, but left that to be negotiated in later phases of the process. The proposal never made it beyond the first phase, whose goals called for a halt to both Israeli settlement construction and Israeli–Palestinian violence. Neither goal has been achieved as of November 2015.

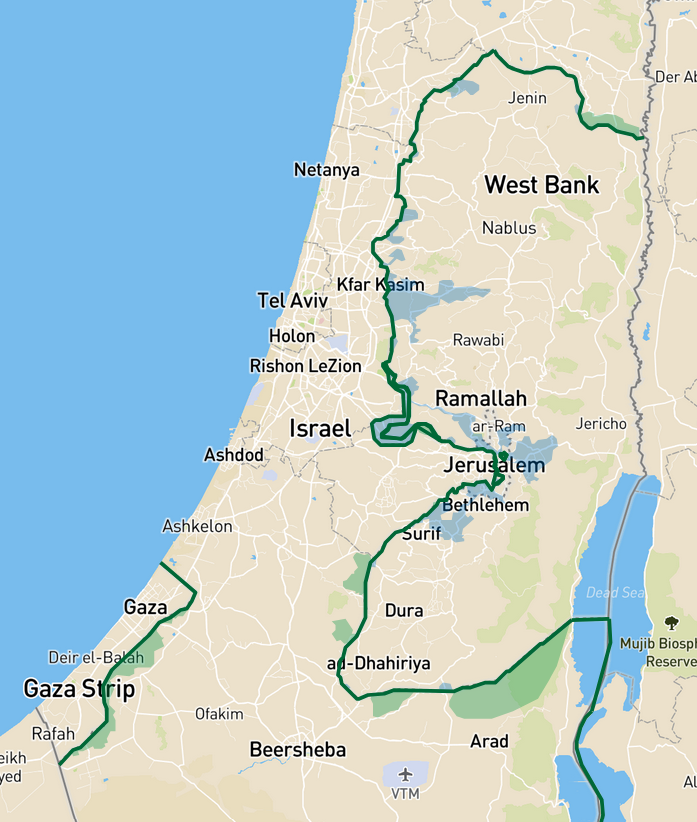
The Israeli proposal of the exchange of territories at the Annapolis conference, according to the Economic Cooperation Foundation think-tank (blue to Israel, green to the Palestinian state)

The Annapolis Conference was a Middle East peace conference held on 27 November 2007, at the United States Naval Academy in Annapolis, Maryland, United States. The conference aimed to revive the Israeli–Palestinian peace process and implement the "Roadmap for peace". The conference ended with the issuing of a joint statement from all parties. After the Annapolis Conference, the negotiations were continued. Both Mahmoud Abbas and Ehud Olmert presented each other with competing peace proposals. Ultimately no agreement was reached.

=== Arab Peace Initiative (2002, 2007, 2017) ===
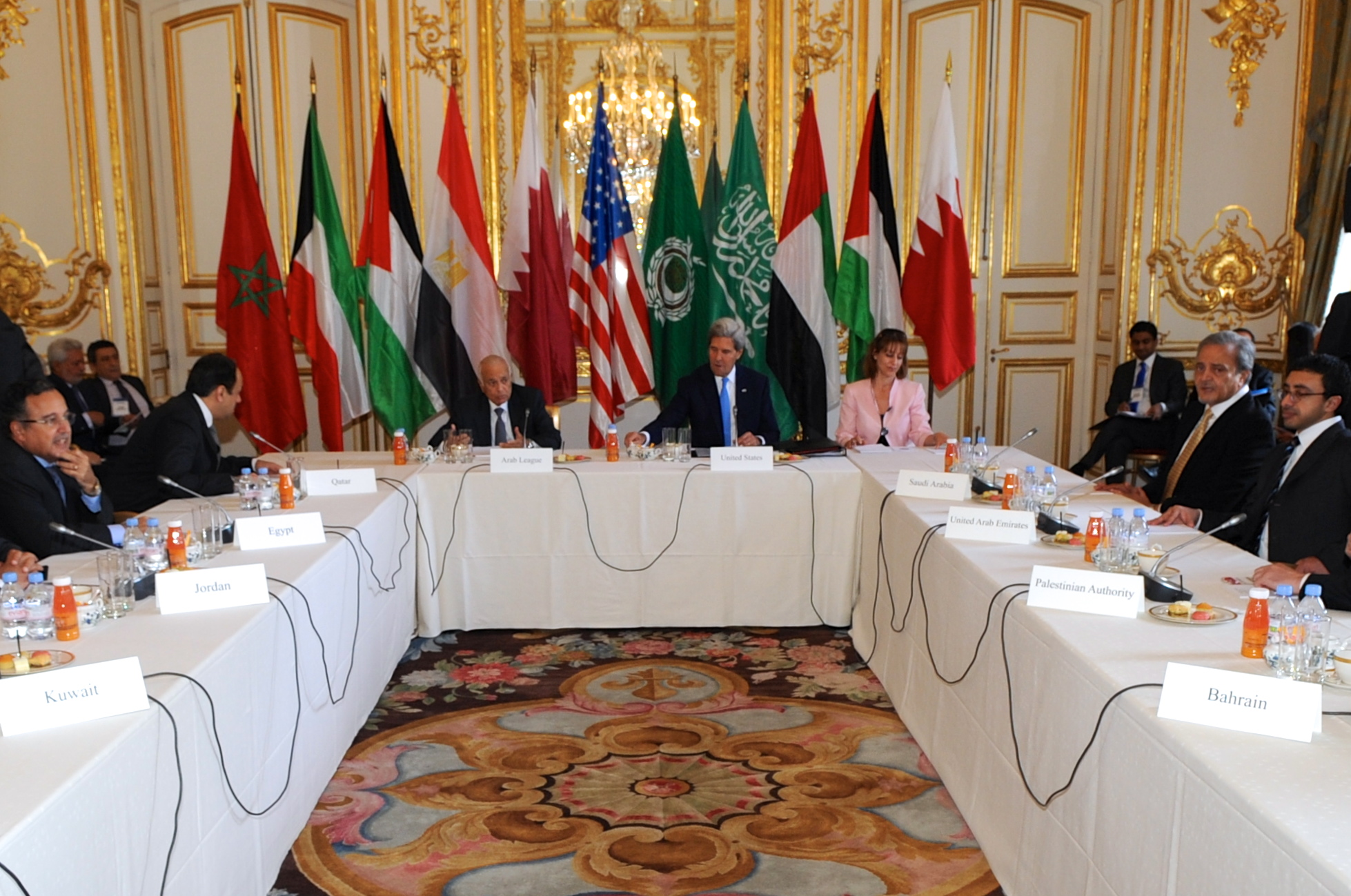
U.S. Secretary of State John Kerry meets with an Arab Peace Initiative delegation in Paris, 2013.

The Arab Peace Initiative (Arabic: مبادرة السلام العربية Mubādirat as-Salām al-ʿArabīyyah), also known as the Saudi Initiative, was first proposed by Crown Prince Abdullah of Saudi Arabia at the 2002 Beirut summit. The initiative is a proposed solution to the Arab–Israeli conflict as a whole, and the Israeli–Palestinian conflict in particular. The initiative was initially published on 28 March 2002, at the Beirut summit, and agreed upon again at the 2007 Riyadh summit. Unlike the Road Map for Peace, it spelled out "final solution" borders based on the UN borders established before the 1967 Six-Day War. It offered full normalization of relations with Israel, in exchange for the withdrawal of its forces from all the occupied territories, including the Golan Heights, to recognize "an independent Palestinian state with East Jerusalem as its capital" in the West Bank and Gaza Strip, as well as a "just solution" for the Palestinian refugees.

The Palestinian Authority led by Yasser Arafat immediately embraced the initiative. His successor Mahmoud Abbas also supported the plan and officially asked U.S. President Barack Obama to adopt it as part of his Middle East policy. Islamist political party Hamas, the elected government of the Gaza Strip, was deeply divided, with most factions rejecting the plan. Palestinians have criticized the Israel–United Arab Emirates normalization agreement and another with Bahrain signed in September 2020, fearing the moves weaken the Arab Peace Initiative, regarding the UAE's move as "a betrayal."

The Israeli government under Ariel Sharon rejected the initiative as a "non-starter" because it required Israel to withdraw to pre-June 1967 borders. After the renewed Arab League endorsement in 2007, then-Prime Minister Ehud Olmert gave a cautious welcome to the plan. In 2015, Israeli Prime Minister Benjamin Netanyahu expressed tentative support for the Initiative, but in 2018, he rejected it as a basis for future negotiations with the Palestinians.

== Current status ==
=== Apartheid ===
In April 2021, Human Rights Watch released its report A Threshold Crossed, describing the policies of Israel towards Palestinians living in Israel, the West Bank and Gaza constituted the crime of apartheid. As of 2022, various Israeli and international human rights organizations were in agreement with the report Israeli actions constituted the crime of apartheid. A further report titled Israel's Apartheid Against Palestinians: Cruel System of Domination and Crime Against Humanity was released by Amnesty International on 1 February 2022. However, others have disagreed with the characterization. The head of the International Committee of the Red Cross to Israel has said the organization rejects the charge. In 2023, US House of Representatives passed a resolution calling the Apartheid claim "absurd."

In 2018, the Knesset passed the Nation-State law which the Israeli legal NGO Adalah nicknamed the "Apartheid law." Adalah described the Nation-State law as "constitutionally enshrining Jewish supremacy and the identity of the State of Israel as the nation-state of the Jewish people." The Nation-State law is a Basic Law, meaning that it has "quasi-constitutional status," and states that the right to exercise national self-determination in Israel is "unique to the Jewish people". In July 2024, the International Court of Justice determined that Israeli policies violate the International Convention on the Elimination of All Forms of Racial Discrimination. Law Professor Solon Solomon said "the court's stance suggests a hesitation to explicitly opine" on the apartheid claim.

=== Occupied Palestinian territory ===
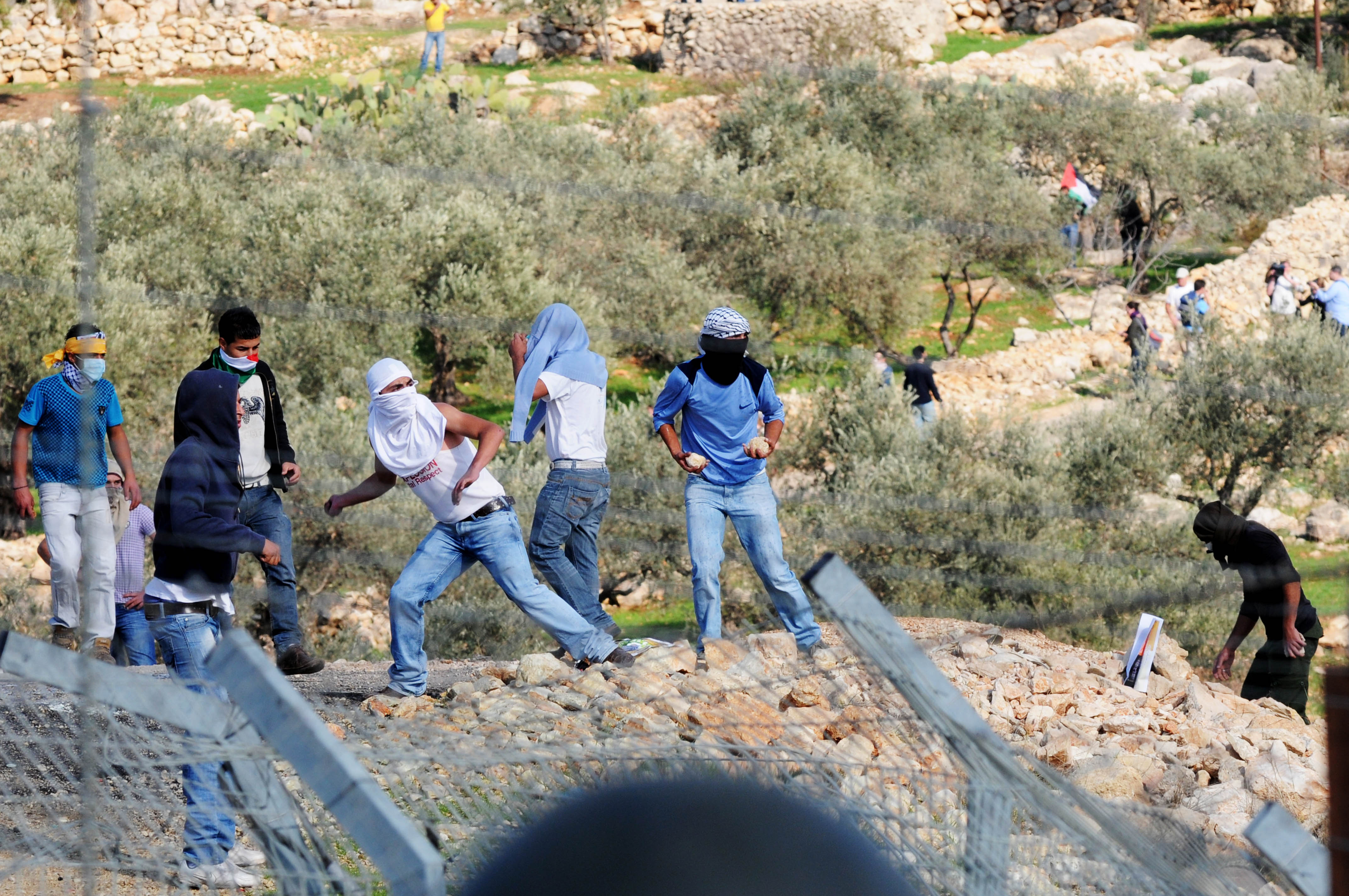
Protest against land confiscation held at Bil'in, 2011

Israel has occupied the Palestinian territories, which comprise the West Bank (including East Jerusalem) and the Gaza Strip, since the 1967 Six-Day War, making it the longest military occupation in modern history. In 2024, the International Court of Justice determined that the Palestinian territories constitute one political unit and that Israel's occupation since 1967, and the subsequent creation of Israeli settlements and exploitation of natural resources, are illegal under international law. The court also ruled that Israel should pay full reparations to the Palestinian people for the damage the occupation has caused.

Some Palestinians say they are entitled to all of the West Bank, Gaza Strip, and East Jerusalem. Israel says it is justified in not ceding all this land, because of security concerns, and also because the lack of any valid diplomatic agreement at the time means that ownership and boundaries of this land is open for discussion. Palestinians believe any reduction of their territorial claims is a severe deprivation of their rights. In negotiations, the Palestinian stance is that any moves to reduce the boundaries of this land is a hostile move against their key interests. Israel considers this land to be in dispute and feels the purpose of negotiations is to define what the final borders will be. In 2017 Hamas announced that it was ready to support a Palestinian state on the 1967 borders "without recognising Israel or ceding any rights".

==== Israeli settlements ====
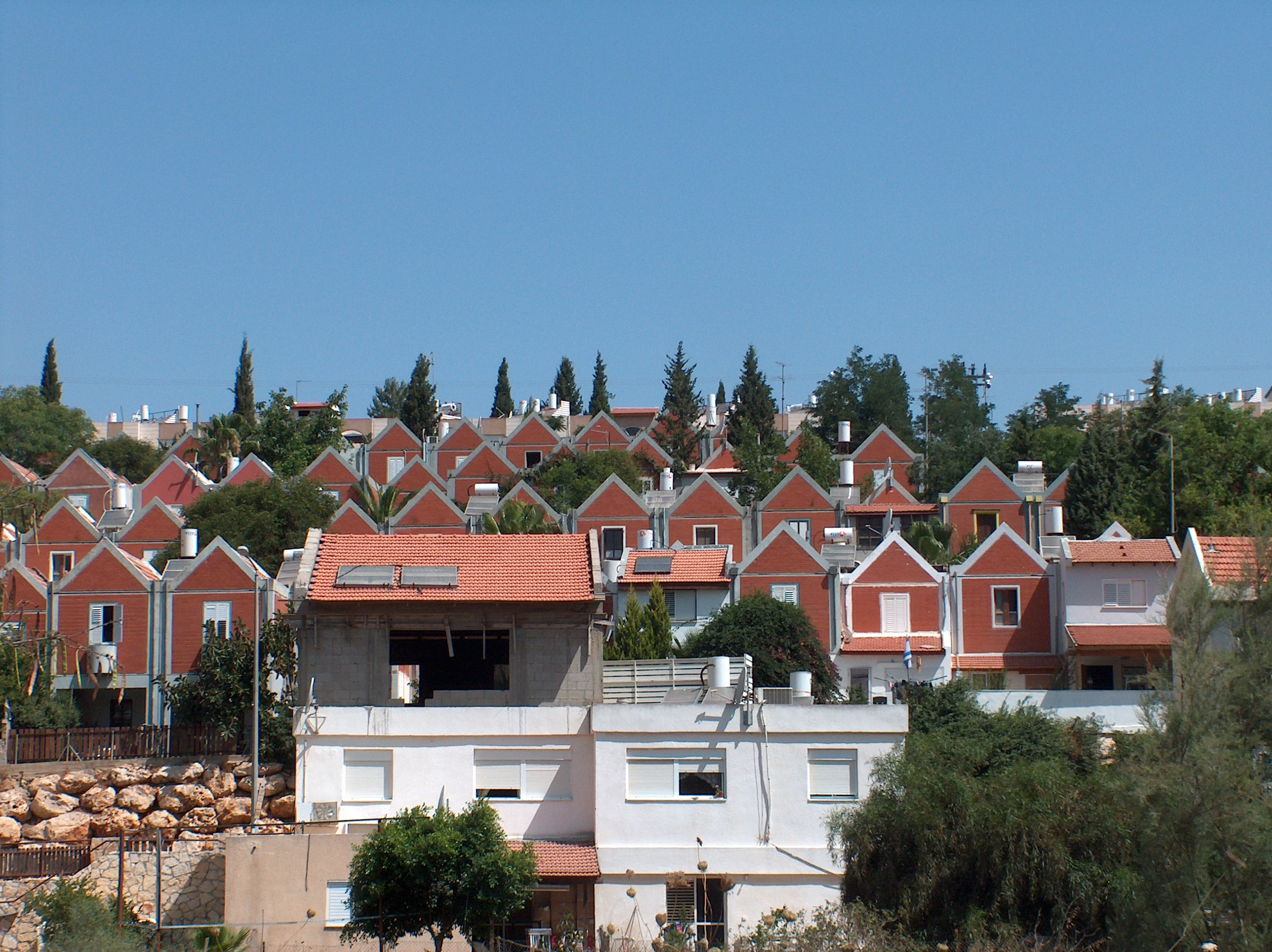
A neighborhood in the settlement of Ariel in the Israeli occupied West Bank, which is home to the Ariel University

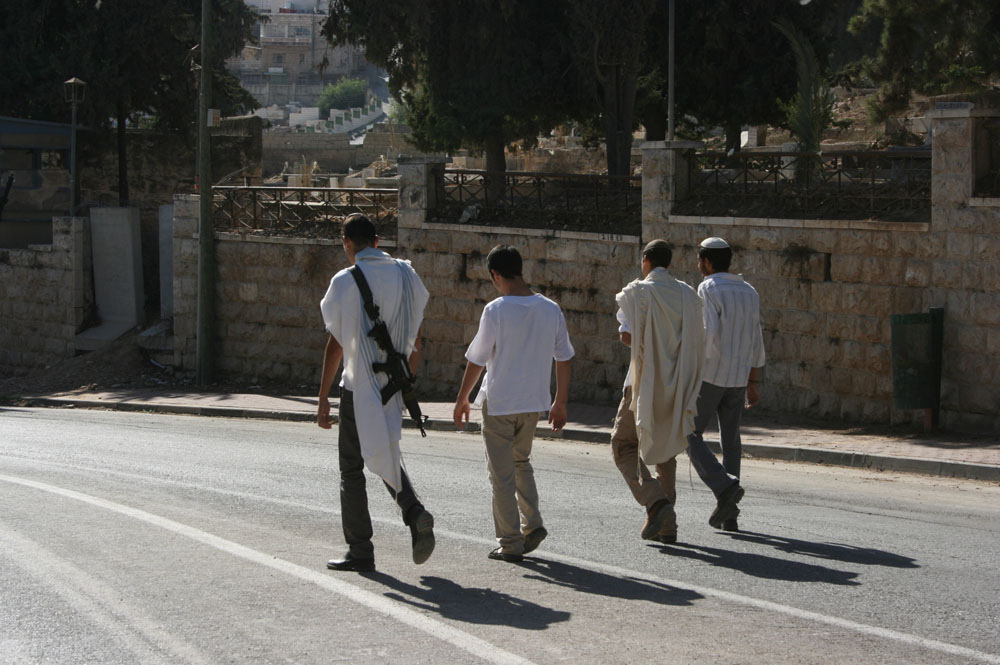
Israeli settlers in Hebron, West Bank

The international community considers Israeli settlements to be illegal under international law, but Israel disputes this. Those who justify the legality of the settlements use arguments based upon Articles 2 and 49 of the Fourth Geneva Convention, as well as UN Security Council Resolution 242. The expansion of settlements often involves the confiscation of Palestinian land and resources, leading to displacement of Palestinian communities and creating a source of tension and conflict. Settlements are often protected by the Israeli military and are frequently flashpoints for violence against Palestinians. Furthermore, the presence of settlements and Jewish-only bypass roads creates a fragmented Palestinian territory, seriously hindering economic development and freedom of movement for Palestinians. Amnesty International reports that Israeli settlements divert resources needed by Palestinian towns, such as arable land, water, and other resources; and that settlements reduce Palestinians' ability to travel freely via local roads, owing to security considerations.

As of 2023, there were about 500,000 Israeli settlers living in the West Bank, with another 200,000 living in East Jerusalem. In February 2023, Israel's Finance Minister Bezalel Smotrich took charge of most of the Civil Administration, obtaining broad authority over civilian issues in the West Bank. In the first six months of 2023, 13,000 housing units were built in settlements, which is almost three times more than in the whole of 2022.

==== Israeli military police ====
In a report published in February 2014 covering incidents over the three-year period of 2011–2013, Amnesty International stated that Israeli forces employed reckless violence in the West Bank, and in some instances appeared to engage in wilful killings which would be tantamount to war crimes. Besides the numerous fatalities, Amnesty said at least 261 Palestinians, including 67 children, had been gravely injured by Israeli use of live ammunition. In this same period, 45 Palestinians, including 6 children had been killed. Amnesty's review of 25 civilian deaths concluded that in no case was there evidence of the Palestinians posing an imminent threat. At the same time, over 8,000 Palestinians suffered serious injuries from other means, including rubber-coated metal bullets. Only one IDF soldier was convicted, killing a Palestinian attempting to enter Israel illegally. The soldier was demoted and given a 1-year sentence with a five-month suspension. The IDF answered the charges stating that its army held itself "to the highest of professional standards", adding that when there was suspicion of wrongdoing, it investigated and took action "where appropriate".

=== Separation of the Gaza Strip ===
Since 2006, Israel has enforced an official and explicit policy of enforcing "separation" between the West Bank and Gaza Strip. This separation policy has involved strict restrictions on imports, exports and travel to and from the Gaza Strip. This policy began to develop as early as the 1950s, but was further formalized with the implementation of an Israeli closure regime in 1991, where Israel began requiring Gazans to obtain permits to exit the Gaza Strip and to enter the West Bank (cancelling the "general exit permit"). By treating the Gaza Strip as a separate entity, Israel has aimed to increase its control over the West Bank while avoiding a political resolution to the conflict. The lack of territorial contiguity between Gaza and the West Bank and the absence of any "safe passage" explain the success of Israel's policy of separation. Harvard political economist Sara Roy describes the separation policy as motivated by Israeli rejection of territorial compromise, fundamentally undermining Palestinian political and economic cohesion and weakening national unity among Palestinians.

The severing of Gaza from the West Bank hinterland reflects a paradigm shift in the framing of the conflict. After Hamas assumed power in 2007, Israel declared Gaza a "hostile territory," preferring to frame its obligations towards Gaza in terms of the law of armed conflict, over what Israel presented as a border dispute, as opposed to those of military occupation (this framing was rebuffed by the ICJ in 2024 when the court stated that Israel continued to occupy the Gaza Strip even after the 2005 disengagement). Indeed, the intensified blockade policy was presented by Israeli officials as "economic warfare" intended to "keep the Gazan economy on the brink of collapse" at the "lowest possible level." Roy cites an Israeli Supreme Court's decision approving fuel cuts to Gaza as emblematic of the disabling of Gaza; the court deemed the fuel cuts permissible on the basis that they would not harm the population's "essential humanitarian needs."

The executive director of the Israeli human rights organization Gisha described Israeli policy towards Gaza between 2007 and 2010 as "explicitly punitive," controlling the entry of food based on calculated calorie needs to limit economic activity and enforce "economic warfare." These restrictions included allowing only small packets of margarine to prevent local food production. Gaza's GDP dramatically declined during this period as a result of these measures. Indeed, by April 2010 Israel restricted the entry of commercial items to Gaza to a list of 73 products, compared with 4,000 products which had previously been approved. The result was the virtual collapse of Gaza's private sector, which Roy describes as largely completed after the 2008 Israeli Operation Cast Lead in Gaza. According to Gisha, travel restrictions from the Gaza Strip are not based on individual security concerns, rather, the general rule is that travel to Israel or the West Bank from Gaza is not permitted other than in "exceptional" cases. Israeli imposed travel restrictions aim in particular to prevent Gazans from living in the West Bank. Indeed, Israeli policy treats the Gaza Strip as a "terminus" station, with family reunification between the West Bank and Gaza Strip only possible if the family agrees to permanently relocate to the Gaza Strip. The Israeli officials described the blockade as serving limited security value, instead referring to these restrictions as motivated by "political-security."

==== Blockade of the Gaza Strip ====
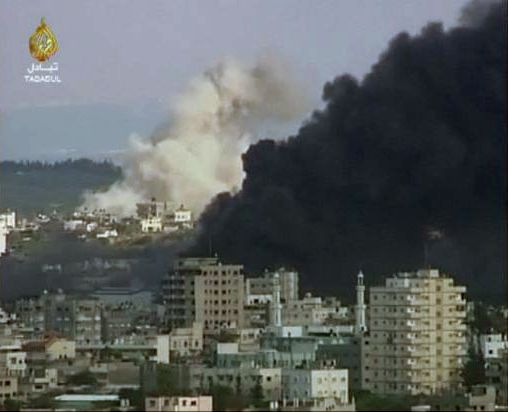
Israel's attack on Gaza in 2009

Although closure has a long history in Gaza dating back to 1991 when it was first imposed, it was made more acute after 2000 with the start of the second intifada. Closure was tightened further after the 2005 disengagement and then again in 2006, after Hamas's electoral victory. Heightened restrictions were imposed on imports and exports as well as on the movement of people, including Gaza's labor force. The total siege of Gaza that was imposed following the Hamas led attack on Israel during 7 October 2023, was part of that same policy of separation and closure, characterized by the destruction of Gaza's infrastructure (especially housing) and the denial of food, water, electricity, and fuel to its population. On 9 October 2023, Israel declared war on Hamas and tightened its blockade of the Gaza Strip. Israeli Defense Minister Yoav Gallant declared, "There will be no electricity, no food, no fuel, everything is closed. We are fighting human animals and we are acting accordingly."

Since its initiation, blockade has had a detrimental impact on the private sector in Gaza, the primary driver of economic growth in Gaza. Prior to the blockade, Gaza imported 95% of its inputs for manufacturing and exported 85% of the finished products (primarily to Israel and the West Bank). Employment in this sector dropped to 4% by 2010, with an overall unemployment rate of 40% at this time and 80% of the population living on less than 2 dollars a day. Fewer than 40 commercial items were allowed in to the Gaza Strip by 2009, compared to a list of 4,000 items before the start of the blockade. Fuel imports were restricted such that 95% of Gaza's industrial operations were forced to close, with the rest operating far below capacity. In aggregate, 100,000 out of the 120,000 employed in the private sector lost their jobs as a result of the blockade. Most critically for the economy has been the near complete ban on exports from the Gaza Strip. The number of truckloads carrying exports fell to 2% their pre-blockade numbers. Only exports to the European market were allowed, a far less profitable market for Gazans than Israel and the West Bank. The products approved for export were primarily flowers and strawberries. The first export to the West Bank or Israel did not happen until 2012 and only in very limited quantities: up to four truckloads of furniture manufactured in Gaza were allowed through Israel for an exhibition in Amman.

Even in the early years of Israeli imposed closure, the associated increased cost of doing business had a detrimental impact on trade. Goods transferred between the West Bank, Gaza, and Israel were required to be loaded onto Palestinian trucks initially and then off loaded onto Israeli trucks at the border even for distances of 50–100 miles. These increased costs include the costs for security checks, clearance, storage, and spoilage, as well as increased transportation costs.

The Military Advocate General of Israel said that Israel is justified under international law to impose a blockade on an enemy for security reasons as Hamas "turned the territory under its de facto control into a launching pad of mortar and rocket attacks against Israeli towns and villages in southern Israel." Media headlines have described a United Nations commission as ruling that Israel's blockade is "both legal and appropriate." However, Amnesty International has stated that this is "completely false," and that the cited UN report made no such claim. The Israeli Government's continued land, sea and air blockage is tantamount to collective punishment of the population, according to the United Nations Office for the Coordination of Humanitarian Affairs.

In January 2008, the Israeli government calculated how many calories per person were needed to prevent a humanitarian crisis in the Gaza Strip, and then subtracted eight percent to adjust for the "culture and experience" of the Gazans. Details of the calculations were released following Israeli human rights organization Gisha's application to the high court. Israel's Coordinator of Government Activities in the Territories, who drafted the plan, stated that the scheme was never formally adopted, this was not accepted by Gisha.

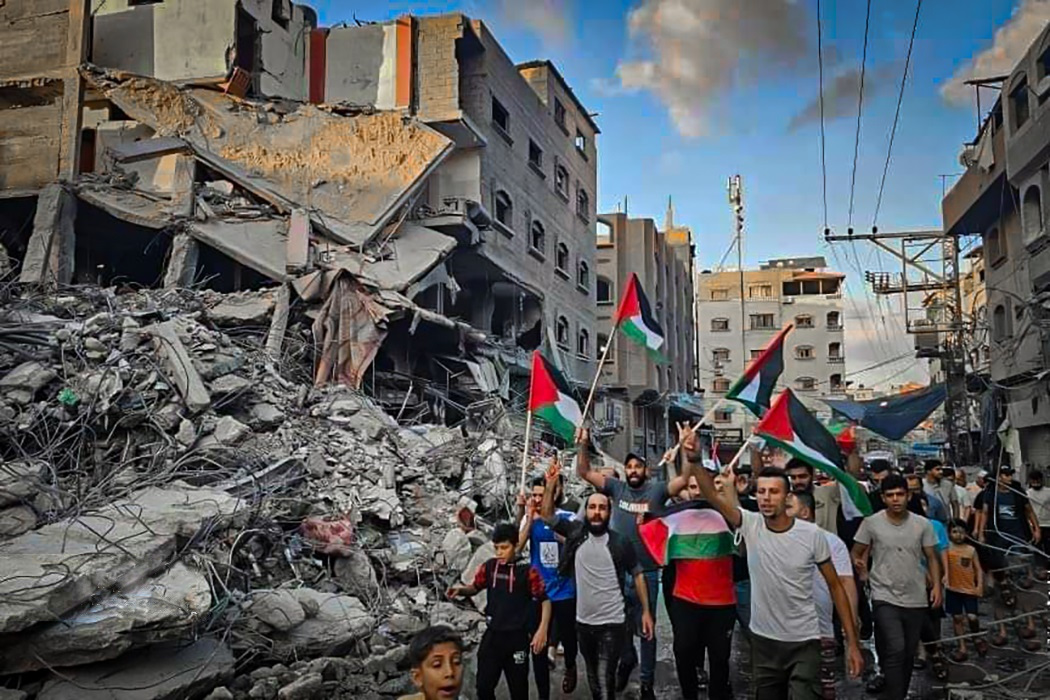
Palestinian protesters in the Gaza Strip during the 2023 Gaza war. Photo by Anas Al-Sharif.

On 20 June 2010, in response to the Gaza flotilla raid, Israel's Security Cabinet approved a new system governing the blockade that would allow practically all non-military or dual-use items to enter the Gaza Strip. According to a cabinet statement, Israel would "expand the transfer of construction materials designated for projects that have been approved by the Palestinian Authority, including schools, health institutions, water, sanitation and more—as well as (projects) that are under international supervision." Despite the easing of the land blockade, Israel will continue to inspect all goods bound for Gaza by sea at the port of Ashdod. Despite these announcements, the economic situation did not substantially change and the virtual complete ban on exports remained in place. Only some consumer products and material for donor-sponsored projects was allowed in.

=== United Nations and recognition of Palestinian statehood ===
State of Palestine Countries that have recognized the State of Palestine Countries that have not recognized the State of Palestine

The PLO has campaigned for full member status for the state of Palestine at the UN and for recognition on the 1967 borders. This campaign has received widespread support. The UN General Assembly votes every year almost unanimously in favor of a resolution calling for the establishment of a Palestinian state on the 1967 borders. The US and Israel instead prefer to pursue bilateral negotiation rather than resolving the conflict on the basis of international law. Netanyahu has criticized the Palestinians of purportedly trying to bypass direct talks, whereas Abbas has argued that the continued construction of Israeli-Jewish settlements is "undermining the realistic potential" for the two-state solution. Although Palestine has been denied full member status by the UN Security Council, in late 2012 the UN General Assembly overwhelmingly approved the de facto recognition of sovereign Palestine by granting non-member state status.

=== Incitements to violence ===
Following the Oslo Accords, which was to set up regulative bodies to rein in frictions, Palestinian incitement against Israel, Jews, and Zionism continued, parallel with Israel's pursuance of settlements in the Palestinian territories, though under Mahmoud Abbas it has reportedly dwindled significantly. Charges of incitement have been reciprocal, both sides interpreting media statements in the Palestinian and Israeli press as constituting incitement. Schoolbooks published for both Israeli and Palestinian schools have been found to have encouraged a one-sided narrative and at times hatred of the other side. Perpetrators of murderous attacks, whether against Israelis or Palestinians, often find strong vocal support from sections of their communities despite varying levels of condemnation from politicians.

Both parties to the conflict have been criticized by third-parties for teaching incitement to their children by downplaying the other side's historical ties to the area, teaching propagandist maps, or indoctrinating their children to one day join the armed forces.

== Issues in dispute ==
The core issues of the conflict are the status of Jerusalem, the right of return for Palestinian refugees, security concerns, Israeli settlements in the West Bank, and borders. With the PLO's recognition of Israel's "right to exist" in 1982, the international community, with the main exception of the United States and Israel, has been in consensus on a framework for resolving the conflict on the basis of international law. Various UN bodies and the ICJ have supported this position; every year, the UN General Assembly votes almost unanimously in favor of a resolution titled "Peaceful Settlement of the Question of Palestine." This resolution consistently affirms the illegality of the Israeli settlements, the annexation of East Jerusalem, and the principle of the inadmissibility of the acquisition of territory by war. It also emphasizes the need for an Israeli withdrawal from the Palestinian territory occupied since 1967 and the need for a just resolution to the refugee question on the basis of UN resolution 194.

Unilateral strategies and the rhetoric of hardline political factions, coupled with violence, have fostered mutual embitterment and hostility and a loss of faith in the possibility of reaching a peaceful settlement. Since the break down of negotiations, security has played a less important role in Israeli concerns, trailing behind employment, corruption, housing and other pressing issues. Israeli policy had reoriented to focus on managing the conflict and the associated occupation of Palestinian territory, rather than reaching a negotiated solution. The expansion of Israeli settlements in the West Bank has led the majority of Palestinians to believe that Israel is not committed to reaching an agreement, but rather to a pursuit of establishing permanent control over this territory in order to provide that security.

=== Status of Jerusalem ===
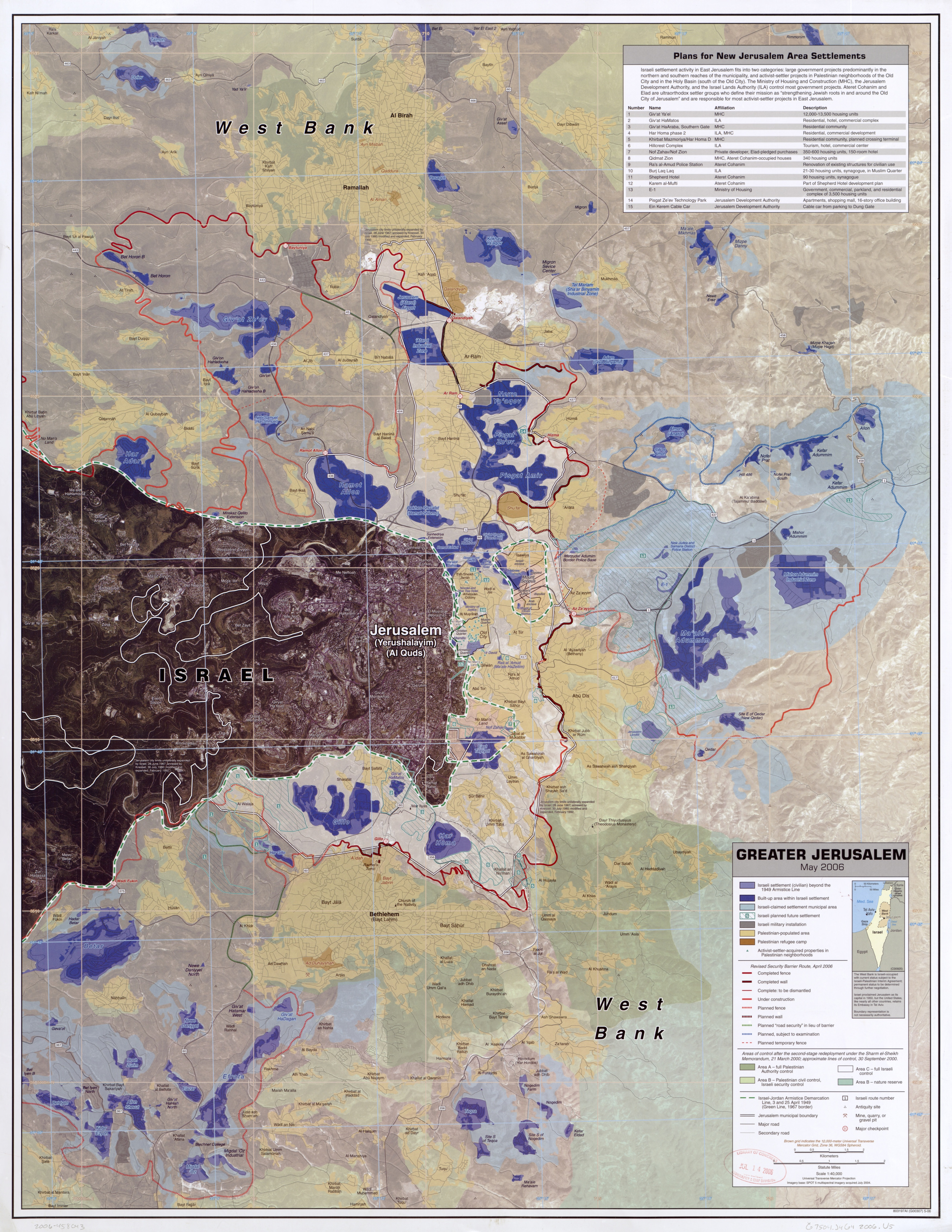
Greater Jerusalem, May 2006. CIA remote sensing map showing what the CIA regards as settlements, plus refugee camps, fences, and walls

In 1967, Israel unilaterally annexed East Jerusalem, in violation of international law. Israel seized a significant area further east of the city, eventually creating a barrier of Israeli settlements around the city, isolating Jerusalem's Palestinian population from the West Bank. Israel's policy of constructing sprawling Jewish neighborhoods surrounding the Palestinian sections of the city were aimed at making a repartition of the city almost impossible. In a further effort to change the demography of Jerusalem in favor of a Jewish majority, Israel discouraged Palestinian presence in the city while encouraging Jewish presence, as a matter of policy. Specifically, Israel introduced policies restricting the space available for the construction of Palestinian neighborhoods, delaying or denying building permits and raising housing demolition orders. Tensions in Jerusalem are primarily driven by provocations by Israeli authorities and Jewish extremists against Arabs in the city.

The Israeli government, including the Knesset and Supreme Court, is seated in the "new city" of West Jerusalem and has been since Israel's founding in 1948. After Israel annexed East Jerusalem in 1967, it assumed complete administrative control of East Jerusalem. Since then, various UN bodies have consistently denounced Israel's control over East Jerusalem as invalid. In 1980, Israel passed the Jerusalem Law declaring "Jerusalem, complete and united, is the capital of Israel."

Many countries do not recognize Jerusalem as Israel's capital, with exceptions being the United States and Russia. The majority of UN member states and most international organizations do not recognize Israel's claims to East Jerusalem, which occurred after the 1967 Six-Day War, nor its 1980 Jerusalem Law proclamation. The International Court of Justice in its 2004 Advisory opinion on the "Legal Consequences of the Construction of a Wall in the Occupied Palestinian Territory" described East Jerusalem as "occupied Palestinian territory".

The three largest Abrahamic religions—Judaism, Islam, and Christianity—hold Jerusalem as an important setting for their religious and historical narratives. Jerusalem is the holiest city in Judaism, being the former location of the Jewish temples on the Temple Mount and the capital of the ancient Israelite kingdom. For Muslims, Jerusalem is the third holiest site, being the location of the Isra' and Mi'raj event, and the Al-Aqsa Mosque. For Christians, Jerusalem is the site of Jesus' crucifixion and the Church of the Holy Sepulchre.

==== Holy sites and the Temple Mount ====
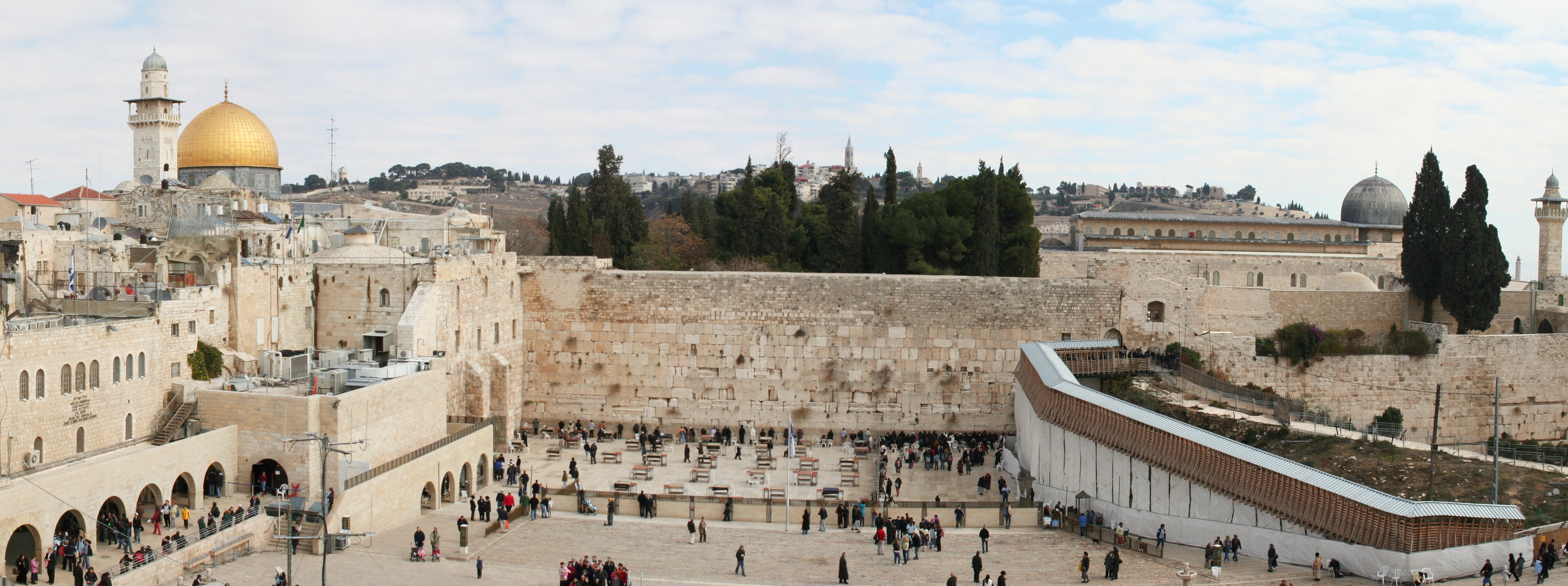
Panorama of the Western Wall with the Dome of the Rock (left) and al-Aqsa mosque (right) in the background

Since the early 20th century, the issue of holy places and particularly the sacred places in Jerusalem has been employed by nationalist politicians.

Israelis did not have access to the holy places in East Jerusalem during the period of Jordanian rule. Since 1975, Israel has banned Muslims from worshiping at Joseph's Tomb, a shrine considered sacred by both Jews and Muslims. Settlers established a yeshiva, installed a Torah scroll and covered the mihrab. During the Second Intifada Palestinian protesters looted and burned the site. Israeli security agencies routinely monitor and arrest Jewish extremists that plan attacks, though many serious incidents have still occurred. Israel has allowed almost complete autonomy to the Muslim trust (Waqf) over the Temple Mount.

Palestinians have voiced concerns regarding the welfare of Christian and Muslim holy places under Israeli control. Additionally, some Palestinian advocates have made statements alleging that the Western Wall Tunnel was re-opened with the intent of causing the mosque's collapse.

=== Palestinian refugees ===
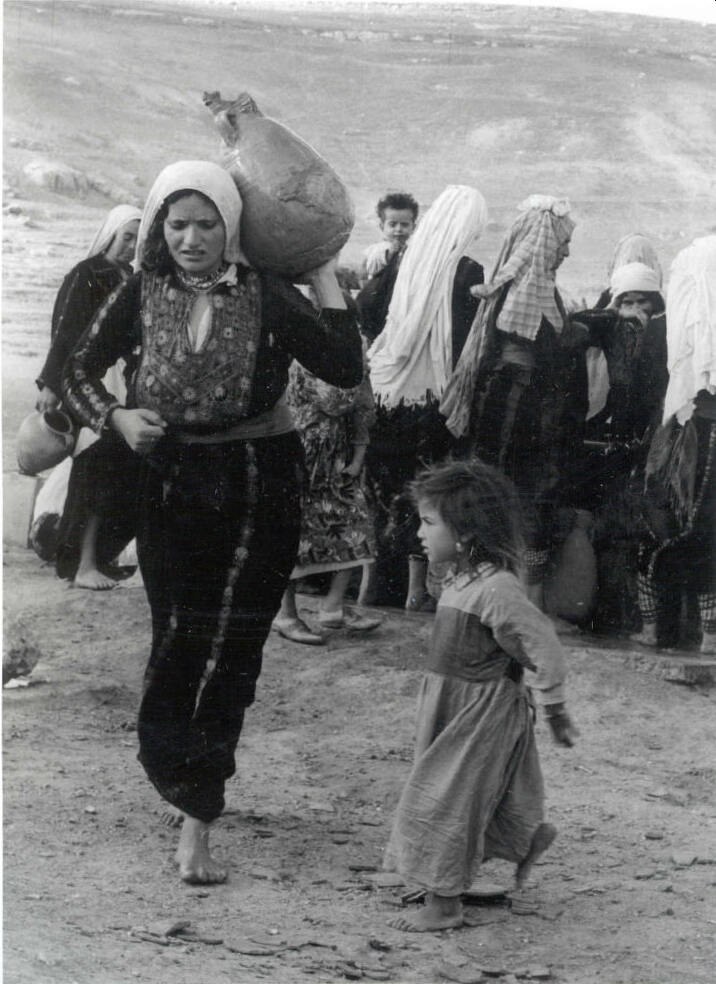
Palestinian refugees, 1948

Palestinian refugees lost both their homes and means of livelihood as a result of the 1948 Arab–Israeli conflict and the 1967 Six-Day War. The number of Palestinians who were expelled or fled from Israel was estimated at 711,000 in 1949. Between 350,000 and 400,000 Palestinians were displaced during the 1967 Arab–Israeli war. According to the United Nations Relief and Works Agency for Palestine Refugees in the Near East (UNRWA), the descendants of those expelled during the Nakba are also considered refugees and that this principle is not unique to Palestinians. Critics consider that the conferral of the refugee status to the descendants of the original refugees perpetuates the refugee crisis. According to Albanese and Takkenberg, the practice follows the international norms. As of 2010 there are 4.7 million Palestinian refugees.

A third of the refugees live in recognized refugee camps in Jordan, Lebanon, Syria, the West Bank and the Gaza Strip. The remainder live in and around the cities and towns of these host countries. Most Palestinian refugees were born outside Israel and are not allowed to live in any part of historic Palestine.

Since 1948, Israel has prevented the return of Palestinian refugees and refused any settlement permitting their return except in limited cases. On the basis of the Universal Declaration of Human Rights and UN General Assembly Resolution 194, Palestinians claim the right of refugees to return to the lands, homes and villages where they lived before being driven into exile in 1948 and 1967. Arafat himself repeatedly assured his American and Israeli interlocutors at Camp David that he primarily sought the principle of the right of return to be accepted, rather than the full right of return, in practice.

Palestinian and international authors have justified the right of return of the Palestinian refugees on several grounds: Several scholars included in the broader New Historians argue that the Palestinian refugees fled or were chased out or expelled by the actions of the Haganah, Lehi and Irgun, Zionist paramilitary groups. A number have also characterized this as an ethnic cleansing. The New Historians cite indications of Arab leaders' desire for the Palestinian Arab population to stay put.

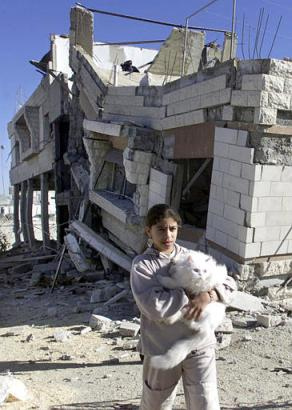
Home in Balata refugee camp demolished during the second Intifada, 2002

The Israeli Law of Return that grants citizenship to people of Jewish descent has been described as discriminatory against other ethnic groups, especially Palestinians that cannot apply for such citizenship under the law of return, to the territory which they were expelled from or fled during the course of the 1948 war.

According to the UN Resolution 194, adopted in 1948, "the refugees wishing to return to their homes and live at peace with their neighbours should be permitted to do so at the earliest practicable date, and that compensation should be paid for the property of those choosing not to return and for loss of or damage to property which, under principles of international law or in equity, should be made good by the Governments or authorities responsible." UN Resolution 3236 "reaffirms also the inalienable right of the Palestinians to return to their homes and property from which they have been displaced and uprooted, and calls for their return". Resolution 242 from the UN affirms the necessity for "achieving a just settlement of the refugee problem"; however, Resolution 242 does not specify that the "just settlement" must or should be in the form of a literal Palestinian right of return.

Historically, there has been debate over the relative impact of the causes of the 1948 Palestinian exodus, although there is a wide consensus that violent expulsions by Zionist and Israeli forces were the main factor. Other factors include psychological warfare and Arab sense of vulnerability. Notably, historian Benny Morris states that most of Palestine's 700,000 refugees fled because of the "flail of war" and expected to return home shortly after a successful Arab invasion. He documents instances in which Arab leaders advised the evacuation of entire communities as happened in Haifa although recognizes that these were isolated events. In his later work, Morris considers the displacement the result of a national conflict initiated by the Arabs themselves. In a 2004 interview with Haaretz, he described the exodus as largely resulting from an atmosphere of transfer that was promoted by Ben-Gurion and understood by the military leadership. He also claimed that there "are circumstances in history that justify ethnic cleansing". Morris has been criticized by political scientist Norman Finkelstein for having seemingly changed his views for political, rather than historical, reasons.

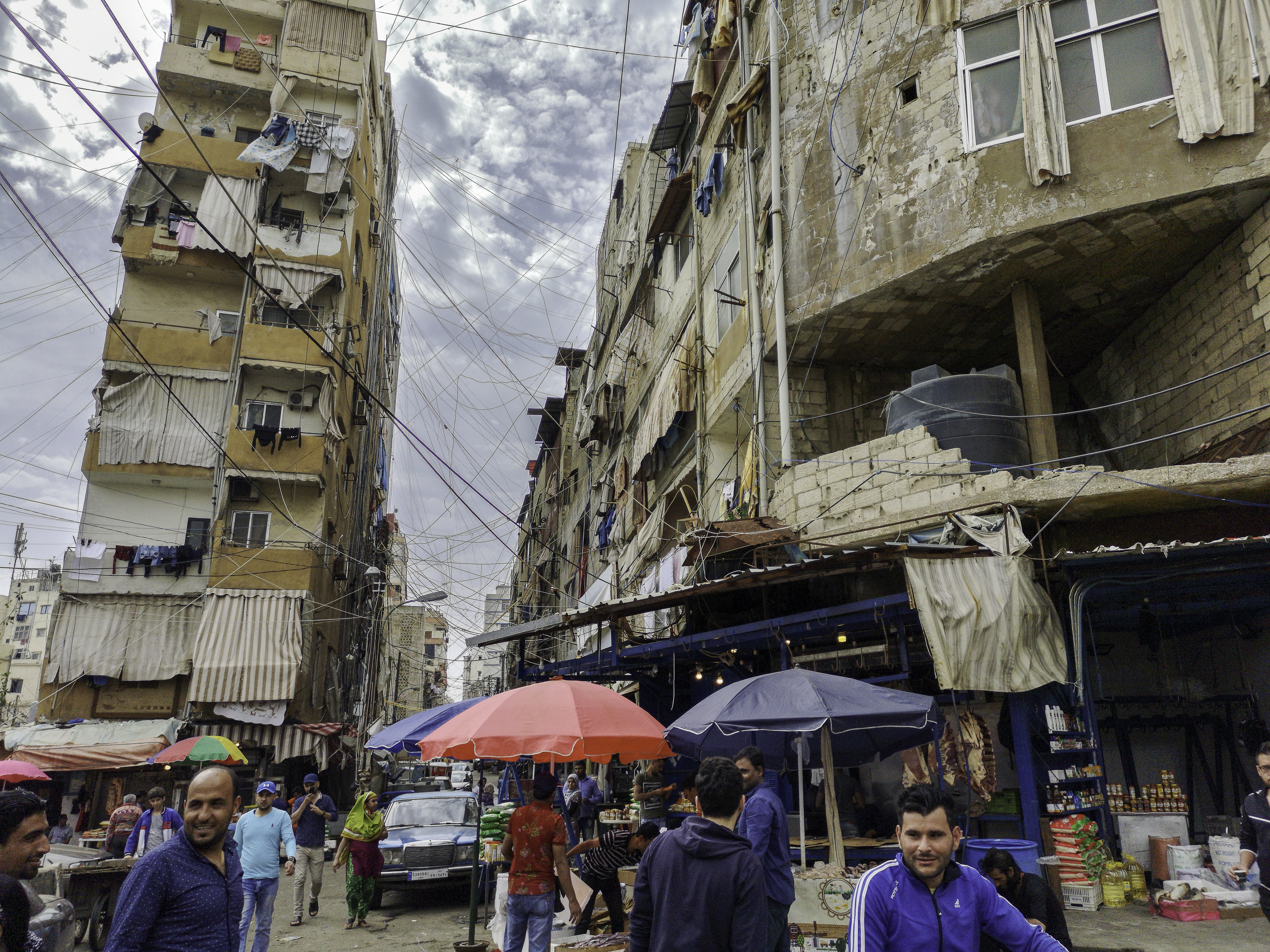
Shatila refugee camp on the outskirts of Beirut in May 2019

Although Israel accepts the right of the Palestinian Diaspora to return into a new Palestinian state, Israel insists that the return of this population into the current state of Israel would threaten the stability of the Jewish state; an influx of Palestinian refugees would lead to the end of the state of Israel as a Jewish state since a demographic majority of Jews would not be maintained.

=== Israeli security concerns ===
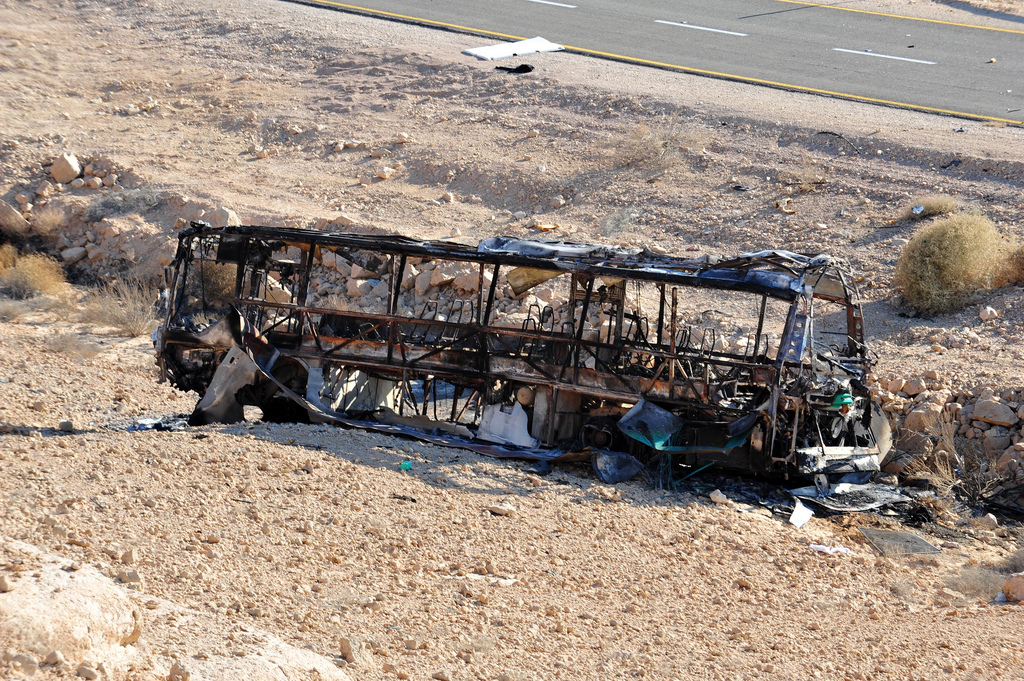
Remains of an Egged bus hit by suicide bomber in the aftermath of the 2011 southern Israel cross-border attacks. Eight people were killed; about 40 were injured.

Throughout the conflict, Palestinian violence has been a concern for Israelis. Security concerns have historically been a key driver in Israeli political decision making, often expanding in scope and taking precedence over other considerations such as international law and Palestinian human rights. The occupation of the West Bank, Gaza, East Jerusalem and the continued expansion of settlements in those areas have been justified on security grounds.

Israel, along with the United States and the European Union, refer to any use of force by Palestinian groups as terroristic and criminal. The United Nations General Assembly resolution A/RES/45/130 reflects an international consensus (113 out of 159 voting nations voted in favor, 13 voted against) affirming Palestinians' legitimacy, as a people under foreign occupation, to use armed struggle to resist said occupation.

In Israel, Palestinian suicide bombers have targeted civilian buses, restaurants, shopping malls, hotels and marketplaces. From 1994 to 2005, 735 civilians were killed in 120 Palestinian suicide attacks. In 1994, Hamas initiated their first lethal suicide attack in response to the cave of the Patriarchs massacre where American-Israeli physician Baruch Goldstein opened fire in a mosque, killing 29 people and injuring 125.

The Israeli government initiated the construction of a security barrier following scores of suicide bombings and terrorist attacks in July 2003. Israel's coalition government approved the security barrier in the northern part of the green line between Israel and the West Bank. According to the IDF, since the erection of the fence, terrorist acts have declined by approximately 90%. The decline in attacks can also be attributed to the permanent presence of Israeli troops inside and around Palestinian cities and increasing security cooperation between the IDF and the Palestinian Authority during this period. The barrier followed a route that ran almost entirely through land occupied by Israel in June 1967, unilaterally seizing more than 10% of the West Bank, including whole neighborhoods and settlement blocs, while splitting Palestinian villages in half with immediate effects on Palestinians' freedom of movement. The barrier, in some areas, isolated farmers from their fields and children from their schools, while also restricting Palestinians from moving within the West Bank or pursuing employment in Israel.

In 2004 the International Court of Justice ruled that the construction of the barrier violated the Palestinian right to self-determination, contravened the Fourth Geneva Convention, and could not be justified as a measure of Israeli self-defense. The ICJ further expressed that the construction of the wall by Israel could become a permanent fixture, altering the status quo. Israel's High Court, however, disagreed with the ICJ's conclusions, stating that they lacked a factual basis. Several human rights organizations, including B'Tselem, Human Rights Watch, and Amnesty International, echoed the ICJ's concerns. The groups suggested that the wall's route was designed to perpetuate the existence of settlements and facilitate their future annexation into Israel, and that the wall was a means for Israel to consolidate control over land used for illegal settlements. The sophisticated structure of the wall also indicated its likely permanence.

Since 2001, the threat of Qassam rockets fired from Palestinian territories into Israel continues to be of great concern for Israeli defense officials. In 2006—the year following Israel's disengagement from the Gaza Strip—the Israeli government claimed to have recorded 1,726 such launches, more than four times the total rockets fired in 2005. As of January 2009, over 8,600 rockets have been launched, causing widespread psychological trauma and disruption of daily life. As a result of these attacks, Israelis living in southern Israel have had to spend long periods in bomb shelters. The relatively small payload carried on these rockets, Israel's advanced early warning system, American-supplied anti-missile capabilities, and network of shelters made the rockets rarely lethal. In 2014, out of 4,000 rockets fired from the Gaza Strip, only six Israeli civilians were killed. For comparison, the payload carried on these rockets is smaller than Israeli tank shells, of which 49,000 were fired in Gaza in 2014.

There is significant debate within Israel about how to deal with the country's security concerns. Options have included military action (including targeted killings and house demolitions of terrorist operatives), diplomacy, unilateral gestures toward peace, and increased security measures such as checkpoints, roadblocks and security barriers. The legality and the wisdom of all of the above tactics have been called into question by various commentators.

Since mid-June 2007, Israel's primary means of dealing with security concerns in the West Bank has been to cooperate with and permit United States-sponsored training, equipping, and funding of the Palestinian Authority's security forces, which with Israeli help have largely succeeded in quelling West Bank supporters of Hamas.

=== Water resources ===
In the Middle East, water resources are of great political concern. Israel receives approximately half of its water from desalination plants. Much of the remainder comes from two large underground aquifers which continue under the Green Line, the use of this water has been contentious in the Israeli–Palestinian conflict. Israel withdraws most water from these areas, but it also supplies the West Bank with approximately 40 million cubic metres annually, contributing to 77% of Palestinians' water supply in the West Bank, which is to be shared for a population of about 2.6 million.

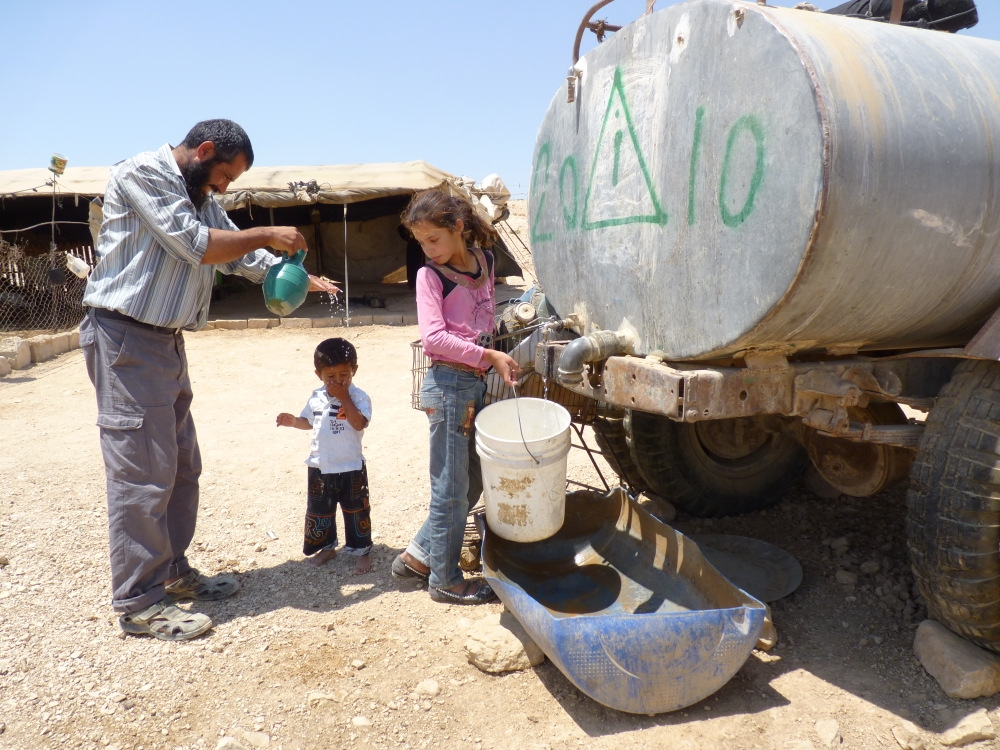
Palestinian villagers purchase water from water trucks in Khirbet A-Duqaiqah in the Hebron Hills.

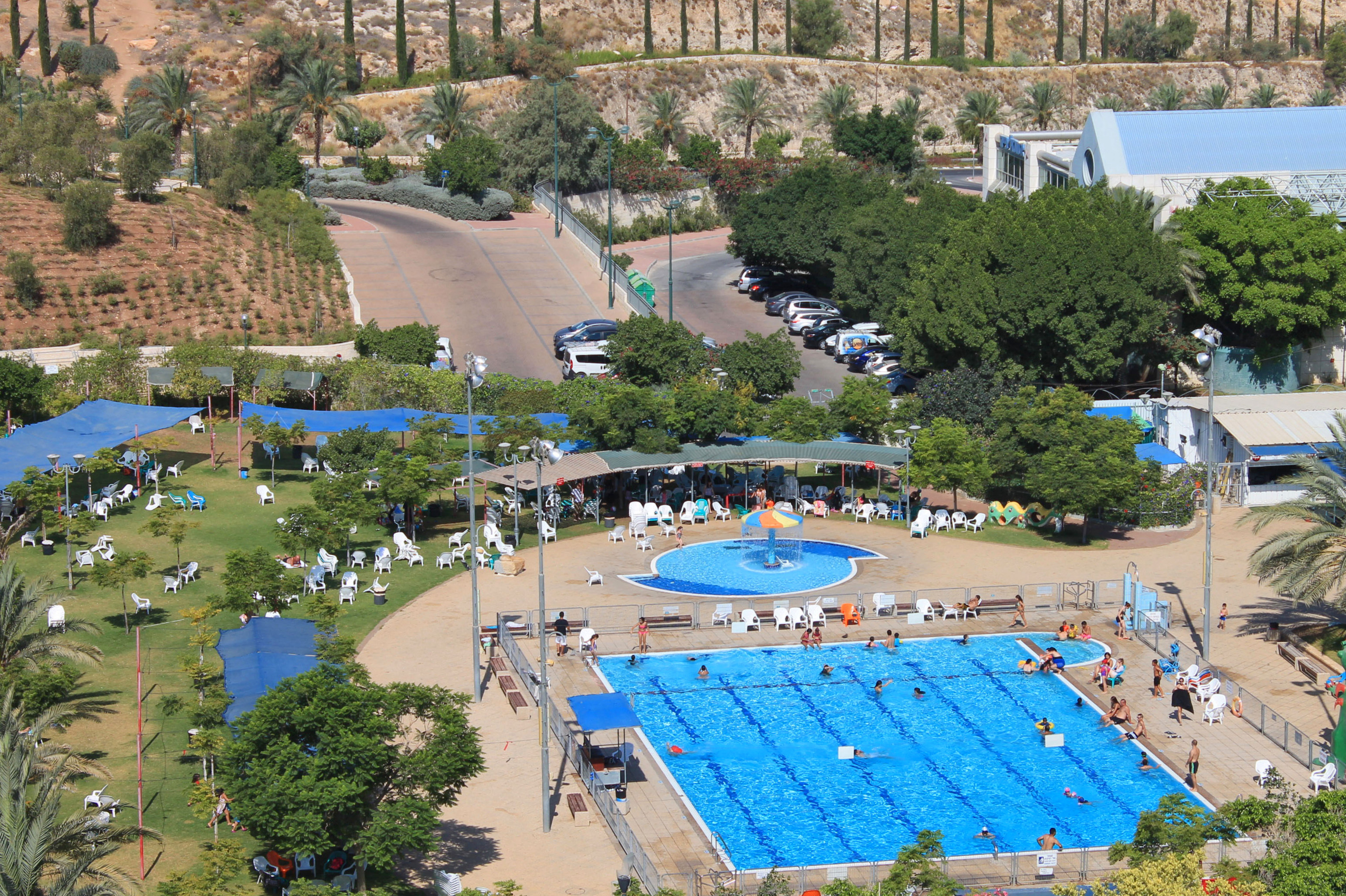
A swimming pool in the Israeli settlement of Ma'ale Adumim, West Bank

While Israel's consumption of this water has decreased since it began its occupation of the West Bank, it still consumes the majority of it: in the 1950s, Israel consumed 95% of the water output of the Western Aquifer, and 82% of that produced by the Northeastern Aquifer. Although this water was drawn entirely on Israel's own side of the pre-1967 border, the sources of the water are nevertheless from the shared groundwater basins located under both West Bank and Israel.

In the Oslo II Accord, both sides agreed to maintain "existing quantities of utilization from the resources." In so doing, the Palestinian Authority established the legality of Israeli water production in the West Bank, subject to a Joint Water Committee (JWC). Moreover, Israel obligated itself in this agreement to provide water to supplement Palestinian production, and further agreed to allow additional Palestinian drilling in the Eastern Aquifer, also subject to the Joint Water Committee. The water that Israel receives comes mainly from the Jordan River system, the Sea of Galilee and two underground sources. According to a 2003 BBC article the Palestinians lack access to the Jordan River system.

According to a report of 2008 by the Food and Agriculture Organization of the United Nations, water resources were confiscated for the benefit of the Israeli settlements in the Ghor. Palestinian irrigation pumps on the Jordan River were destroyed or confiscated after the 1967 war and Palestinians were not allowed to use water from the Jordan River system. Furthermore, the authorities did not allow any new irrigation wells to be drilled by Palestinian farmers, while it provided fresh water and allowed drilling wells for irrigation purposes at the Jewish settlements in the West Bank and Gaza Strip.

In August 2012, the UN released a report projecting that Gaza's population would increase from 1.6 million to 2.1 million by 2020, raising population density to more than 5,800 people per square kilometre. At the report's launch, Max Gaylard, the UN Resident and Humanitarian Coordinator in the occupied Palestinian territory, appeared alongside Jean Gough of UNICEF and Robert Turner of UNRWA. Gaylard said that Gaza would have "half a million more people by 2020" while its economy would grow only slowly, making it harder for residents to obtain drinking water and electricity or send their children to school.

==== Water infrastructure financing ====
Numerous foreign nations and international organizations have established bilateral agreements with the Palestinian and Israeli water authorities. It was estimated that a future investment of about US$1.1bn for the West Bank and $0.8bn for the Gaza Strip Southern Governorates was needed for the planning period from 2003 to 2015.

In late 2012, a donation of $21.6 million was announced by the Government of the Netherlands—the Dutch government stated that the funds would be provided to the UN Relief and Works Agency for Palestinian Refugees in the Near East (UNRWA), for the specific benefit of Palestinian children. An article, published by the UN News website, stated that: "Of the $21.6 million, $5.7 will be allocated to UNRWA's 2012 Emergency Appeal for the occupied Palestinian territory, which will support programmes in the West Bank and Gaza aiming to mitigate the effects on refugees of the deteriorating situation they face."

=== Agricultural rights ===
The conflict has been about land since its inception. When Israel became a state after the war in 1948, 77% of Palestine's land was used for the creation on the state. The majority of those living in Palestine at the time became refugees in other countries and this first land crisis became the root of the Israeli–Palestinian conflict. Because the root of the conflict is with land, the disputes between Israel and Palestine are well-manifested in the agriculture of Palestine.

In Palestine, agriculture is a mainstay in the economy. The production of agricultural goods supports the population's sustenance needs and fuels Palestine's export economy. According to the Council for European Palestinian Relations, the agricultural sector formally employs 13.4% of the population and informally employs 90% of the population. Over the past 10 years, unemployment rates in Palestine have increased and the agricultural sector became the most impoverished sector in Palestine. Unemployment rates peaked in 2008 when they reached 41% in Gaza.

Palestinian agriculture suffers from numerous problems including Israeli military and civilian attacks on farms and farmers, blockades to exportation of produce and importation of necessary inputs, widespread confiscation of land for nature reserves as well as military and settler use, confiscation and destruction of wells, and physical barriers within the West Bank.

=== Israel's West Bank barrier ===
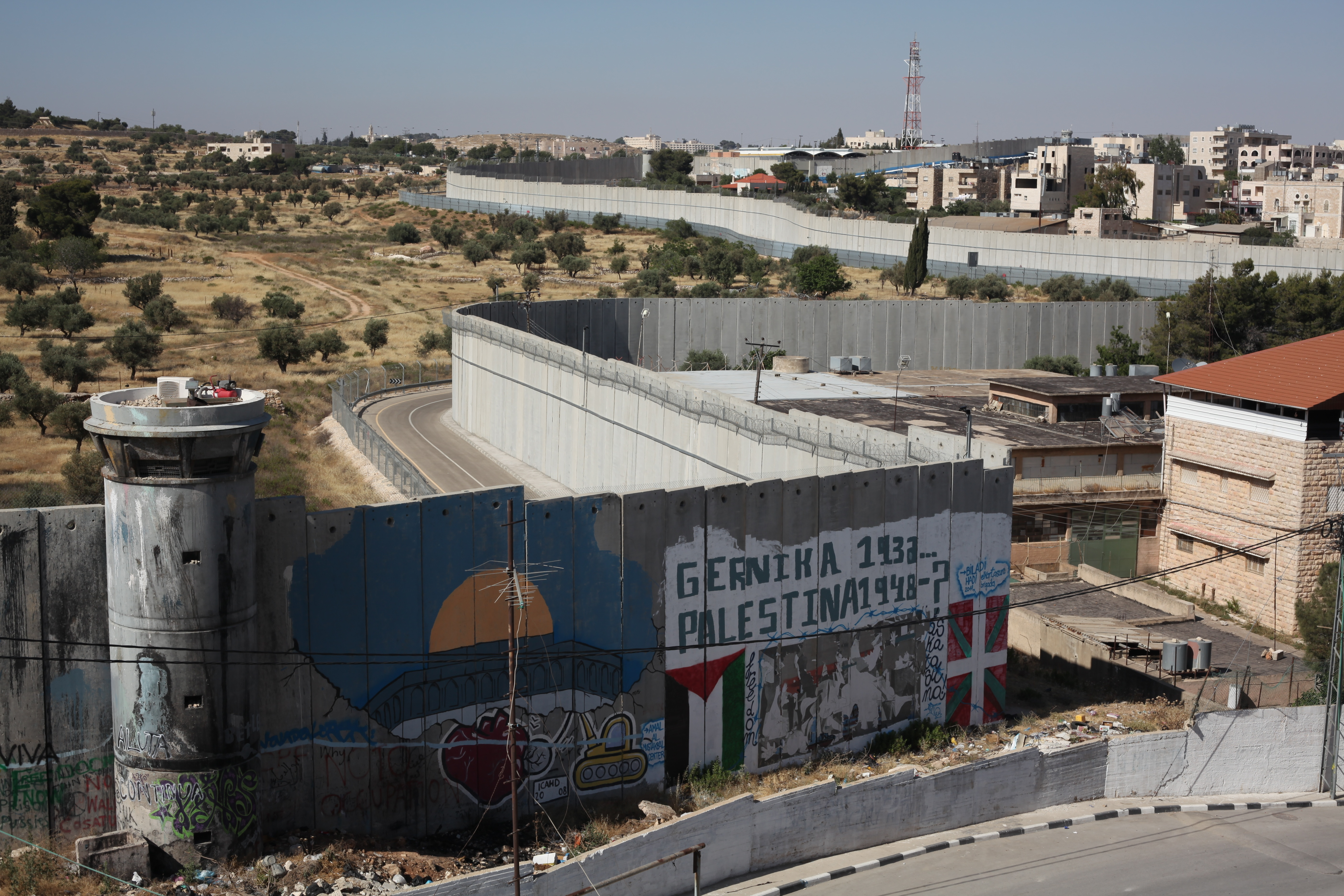
The separation barrier between Israel and the West Bank

With the construction of the separation barrier, the Israeli state promised free movement across regions. However, border closures, curfews, and checkpoints has significantly restricted Palestinian movement. In 2012, there were 99 fixed check points and 310 flying checkpoints. The border restrictions impacted the imports and exports in Palestine and weakened the industrial and agricultural sectors because of the constant Israeli control in the West Bank and Gaza. In order for the Palestinian economy to be prosperous, the restrictions on Palestinian land must be removed. According to The Guardian and a report for World Bank, the Palestinian economy lost $3.4bn (%35 of the annual GDP) to Israeli restrictions in the West Bank alone.

=== Palestinian violence outside of Israel ===
Some Palestinians have committed violent acts over the globe on the pretext of a struggle against Israel.

During the late 1960s, groups affiliated with the PLO became increasingly infamous for its use of international terror. In 1969 alone, these groups were responsible for hijacking 82 planes. El Al Airlines became a regular hijacking target. The hijacking of Air France Flight 139 by the Popular Front for the Liberation of Palestine culminated during a hostage-rescue mission, where Israeli special forces successfully rescued the majority of the hostages.

One of the most well-known and notorious terrorist acts was the capture and eventual murder of 11 Israeli athletes by the Black September Organization during the 1972 Summer Olympics.

=== Palestinian-on-Palestinian violence ===
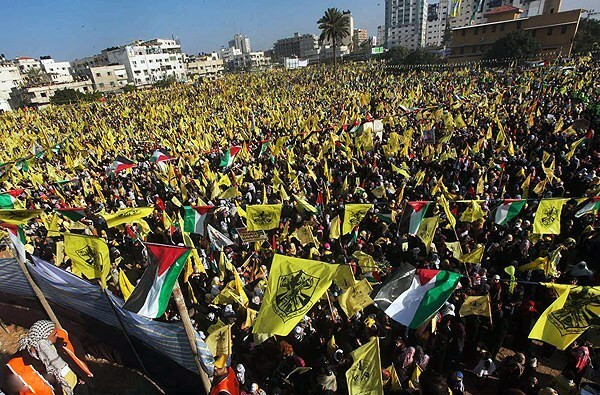
A demonstration in support of Fatah in Gaza City in January 2013

Fighting among rival Palestinian and Arab movements has played a crucial role in shaping Israel's security policy towards Palestinian militants, as well as in the Palestinian leadership's own policies. As early as the 1930s revolts in Palestine, Arab forces fought each other while also skirmishing with Zionist and British forces, and internal conflicts continue to the present day.

In the First Intifada, more than a thousand Palestinians were killed in a campaign initiated by the Palestine Liberation Organization to crack down on suspected Israeli security service informers and collaborators. The Palestinian Authority was strongly criticized for its treatment of alleged collaborators, rights groups complaining that those labeled collaborators were denied fair trials. According to a report released by the Palestinian Human Rights Monitoring Group, less than 45 percent of those killed were actually guilty of informing for Israel.

=== Overriding authority and international status ===
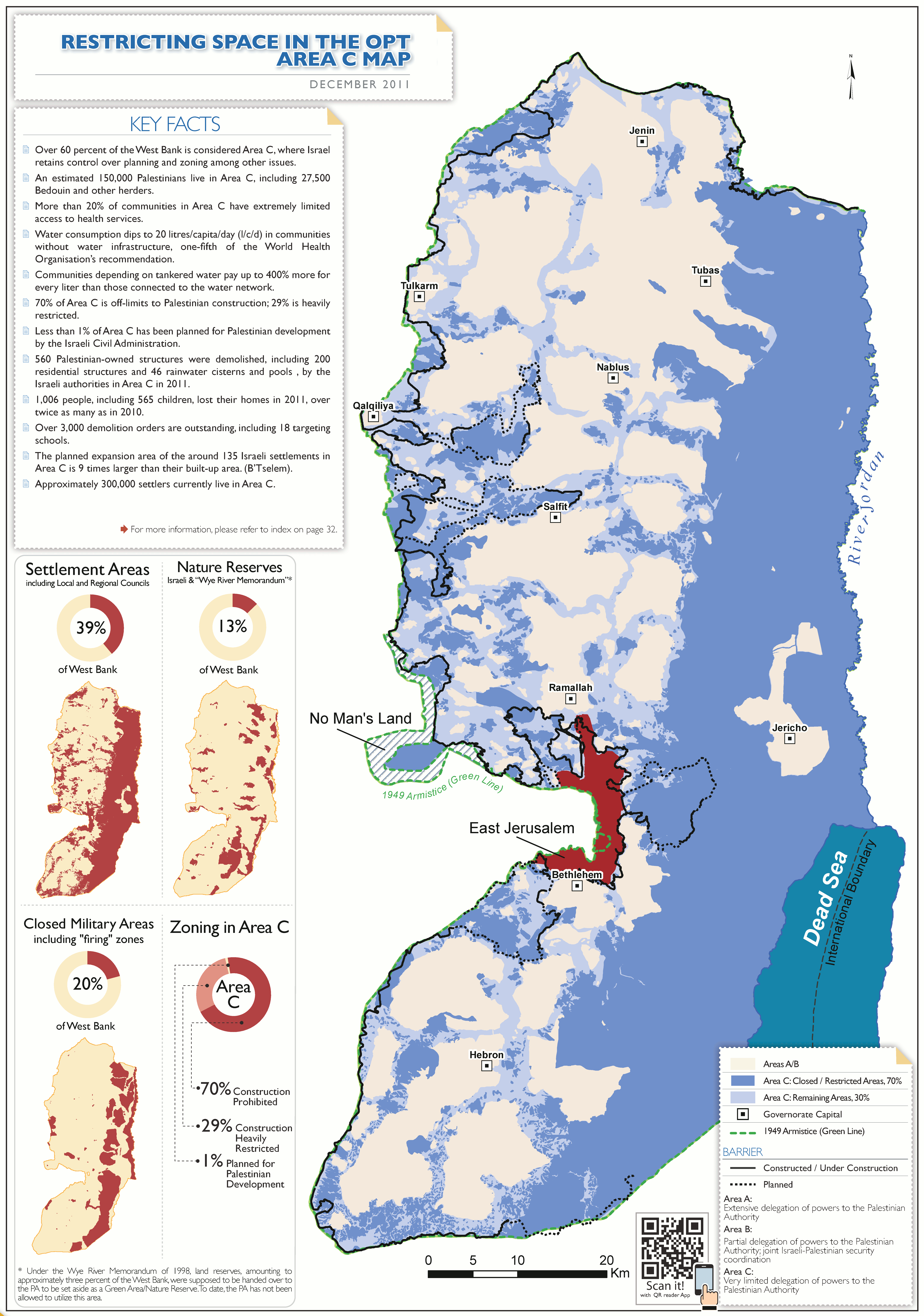
Area C, controlled by Israel under Oslo Accords, in blue and red, in December 2011

As far as Israel is concerned, the jurisdiction of the Palestinian Authority is derived from the Oslo Accords, signed with the PLO, under which it acquired control over cities in the Palestinian territories (Area A) while the surrounding countryside came either under Israeli security and Palestinian civil administration (Area B) or complete Israeli civil administration (Area C). Israel has built additional highways to allow Israelis to traverse the area without entering Palestinian cities in Area A. The initial areas under Palestinian Authority control are diverse and non-contiguous. The areas have changed over time by subsequent negotiations, including Oslo II, Wye River and Sharm el-Sheik. According to Palestinians, the separated areas make it impossible to create a viable nation and fails to address Palestinian security needs; Israel has expressed no agreement to withdrawal from some Areas B, resulting in no reduction in the division of the Palestinian areas, and the institution of a safe pass system, without Israeli checkpoints, between these parts.

Under the Oslo Accords, as a security measure, Israel has insisted on its control over all land, sea and air border crossings into the Palestinian territories, and the right to set import and export controls. This is to enable Israel to control the entry into the territories of materials of military significance and of potentially dangerous persons.

The PLO's objective for international recognition of the State of Palestine is considered by Israel as a provocative "unilateral" act that is inconsistent with the Oslo Accords.

=== Economic disputes and boycotts ===
In Gaza, the agricultural market suffers from economic boycotts and border closures and restrictions placed by Israel.

After Hamas' victory in the 2006 Palestinian legislative election, Israel imposed economic sanctions against the Palestinian Authority. The sanctions were a result of Hamas refusing to recognize Israel, disavow violent actions, and accept previous agreements between Israel and the PA, including the Oslo Accords. The PA's Minister of Agriculture estimates that around US$1.2 billion were lost in September 2006 because of these security measures. As a result, as of 2007, the PA's 160,000 employees had not received their salaries in over one year.

== Fatalities ==
Israeli and Palestinian deaths from 2004 to 2025, as reported by the United Nations Office for the Coordination of Humanitarian Affairs

Studies provide aggregated casualty data for the Israeli–Palestinian conflict. According to the Stockholm International Peace Research Institute, 13,000 Israelis and Palestinians were killed in the conflict between 1948 and 1997. Other estimates give 14,500 killed between 1948 and 2009. During the 1982 Lebanon War, Israel killed an estimated 20,000 Palestinians and Lebanese, not including the 800–3,500 Palestinians killed in the Sabra-Shatila Massacre.

According to Israeli human rights group B'tselem, during the first intifada from 1987 until 2000, 1,551 Palestinians and 421 Israelis lost their lives. According to the database of the UNOffice for the Coordination of Humanitarian Affairs – occupied Palestinian territory (OCHAoPt), 6,407 Palestinians and 308 Israelis were killed in the conflict from 2008 to September 2023, before the Gaza war. The UN figures include both Israeli civilians and security forces casualties in West Bank, Gaza Strip and Israel. All numbers refer to casualties of direct conflict between Israelis and Palestinians including in IDF military operations, artillery shelling, search and arrest campaigns, barrier demonstrations, targeted killings, settler violence etc. The UN figures do not include events indirectly related to the conflict such as casualties from unexploded ordnance, etc., or events when the circumstances remain unclear or are in dispute.

As reported by the B'Tselem, from 29 September 2000 to the year 2010, a total of 7,454 Palestinian and Israeli individuals were killed due to the conflict. According to the report, 1,317 of the 6,371 Palestinians were minors, and at least 2,996 did not participate in fighting at the time of death. Palestinians killed 1,083 Israelis, including 741 civilians, of whom 124 were minors.

The October 7 attacks in 2023 resulted in the deaths of 1,195 Israelis and foreign nationals, including 815 civilians, and 251 taken hostage. In the ensuing Gaza war, over 71,803 Palestinians in Gaza have been reported as killed, (Note: 50,021 Palestinians of which have been fully identified as of 24 March 2025.) over half of them women and children, and more than 171,500 Palestinians have been injured. A study in The Lancet estimated 64,260 deaths due to traumatic injuries by June 2024, while noting a larger potential death toll when "indirect" deaths are included. Israel's tightened blockade of Gaza cut off basic necessities, causing a severe hunger crisis with a high risk of famine persisting as of May 2025.

=== Criticism of casualty statistics ===
The Israeli-based International Policy Institute for Counter-Terrorism (ICT) claimed that Israeli and Palestinian human rights groups overestimated the percentage of civilians killed since the IDF suspected many of those killed to be possible militants.

During Operation Cast Lead, Israeli figures reported the number of Palestinians killed at 1,166 Palestinian, 60 percent were classified as "terrorists" by Israeli officials. This discrepancy is partially due to Israel's classification of Gazan police, who did not take part in hostilities, as combatants. The broad consensus among human rights organizations is that these police were primarily civilians, as they did not actively participate in hostilities nor were they part of armed groups. The accuracy of Israeli casualty figures was further questioned based on the number of children killed. Israel reported 89 Palestinian minors killed, whereas the human rights organization B'Tselem reported 252, substantiating their figures with birth and death certificates and other documents in almost all cases. The Israeli figures also stand out against the figures published by the US Department of State, which reported the number killed "at close to 1,400 Palestinians, including more than 1,000 civilians."

=== Landmines and unexploded ordnance ===
A comprehensive collection mechanism to gather land mine and explosive remnants of war (ERW) casualty data does not exist for the Palestinian territories. In 2009, the United Nations Mine Action Centre reported that more than 2,500 mine and explosive remnants of war casualties occurred between 1967 and 1998, at least 794 casualties (127 killed, 654 injured and 13 unknown) occurred between 1999 and 2008 and that 12 people had been killed and 27 injured since the Gaza War. The UN Mine Action Centre identified the main risks as coming from "ERW left behind by Israeli aerial and artillery weapon systems, or from militant caches targeted by the Israeli forces." There are at least 15 confirmed minefields in the West Bank on the border with Jordan. The Palestinian National Security Forces do not have maps or records of the minefields.

== Public opinion ==
=== Domestic ===
In a Pew Research Center poll in June 2025, Israelis have been found to be more skeptical of peaceful coexistence with Palestinians than before, with a decrease from 50% in 2013 to just 21% in 2025.

In 2021, the Jerusalem Media & Communication Centre conducted two polls among Palestinians, one before the 2021 Israel–Palestine crisis in April and the other after it in October. The polls showed support for a two-state solution decreased from 39% in April to 29% in October.

The trend of decline in support for the two-state solution have been shown to be similar among both Israeli Jews and Palestinians, with support dropping from 53% and 51% respectively in 2016 to just 34% and 33% in 2022. There are differences within each population, with secular respondents from both sides, supporters of Fatah or third parties among Palestinians, and supporters of the moderate left among Israelis more likely than others to support a two-state solution. Additionally, Arab Israelis have also been shown to generally be much more supportive of a two-state solution compared to Israeli Jews or Palestinians.

Domestic opinions remained similar following the Gaza war, where a Gallup poll in August 2025 showed 33% of residents in West Bank and East Jerusalem supported two-state solution compared to 27% in Israel, while 23% and 21% respectively reported belief that permanent peace is possible.

=== International ===
In a Gallup poll among Americans in 2016, 62% reported more sympathy towards Israelis relative to 15% for Palestinians and 23% for neither, both, or no opinion. At the same time, 44% of respondents supported the establishment of a Palestinian state, while 37% opposed and 19% had no opinion.

In a Pew Research Center poll in 2022, a majority of Americans view both the Israeli people (67%) and the Palestinian people (52%) positively. However, views of the respective governments are less positive, for both the Israeli government (48%) and Palestinian government (28%). Regarding a resolution of the conflict, 35% support a two-state solution, 27% support some form of a one-state solution, and 37% are unsure.

In a YouGov poll in Western Europe and the United States in July 2023 (before the Gaza war), a majority across respondents in all the countries surveyed reported support for a two-state solution to the conflict, from 51% in Denmark to 61% in Italy. At the same time, a plurality across the respondents by country also reported their belief that a peace deal between Israel and Palestine as either "not very likely" or "not at all likely", ranging from 41% in the United States to 66% in Spain.

A late July 2025 Gallup poll recorded a sharp decline in American public support for Israel's military conduct in Gaza, dropping from 50% to 32% over 17 months. A Quinnipiac survey published in August 2025 found that at least half of respondents considered Israel's actions in Gaza to constitute genocide.

Internationally, a Pew Research Center survey conducted in spring 2025 found that only three countries—Kenya, Nigeria, and India—held more favorable than unfavorable views of Israel. In the other 21 countries surveyed, including the United States, unfavorable views far exceeded favorable ones. Across all countries, the average unfavorable rating was 62%, compared with 29% favorable.

== See also ==
- Bibliography of the Arab–Israeli conflict
- Children in the Israeli–Palestinian conflict
- Gaza genocide – Ongoing genocide in the Gaza Strip
- Gaza–Israel conflict – Part of the Israeli–Palestinian conflict
- History of Israel
- History of the State of Palestine
- History of Zionism
- International law and the Arab–Israeli conflict
- Israel–Palestine relations
- Israeli war crimes
- Israeli–Lebanese conflict – Conflict involving Israel and Lebanon-based paramilitary groups
- Israeli–Palestinian conflict in Hebron – Ongoing conflict in Palestine
- Israeli–Palestinian conflict in video games
- Jewish diaspora – Dispersion of Jews around the globe
- List of Middle East peace proposals
- List of modern conflicts in the Middle East – List of Middle Eastern conflicts since 1914
- Outline of the Gaza war
- Palestinian genocide allegations
- Palestinian rocket attacks on Israel
- Pan-Arabism – Ideology espousing the unification of Arabs
- Peace Now – Israeli peace advocacy group
- The Holocaust and the Nakba – Historiography on the two events
- Timeline of the Israeli–Palestinian conflict
- Legal assessments of the Gaza flotilla raid
- 2023 Israeli–Palestinian prisoner exchange
