= Occupation of Palestine =

Occupation of Palestine may refer to:

- Occupied Palestinian Territories, a term used interchangeably with Palestine
- Israeli-occupied territories, including Gaza, the West Bank, and the Golan Heights
- Occupation of Gaza (disambiguation)
  - United Arab Republic occupation of the Gaza Strip, 1948/1959–1967
  - Israeli occupation of the Gaza Strip, 1967–present
- Occupation of the West Bank (disambiguation)
  - Jordanian annexation of the West Bank, 1948–1967
  - Israeli occupation of the West Bank, 1967–present
- Occupied Enemy Territory Administration (1917–1920), a joint British, French and Arab military administration over the Ottoman Levant

== See also ==
- History of Palestine
