= History of Palestinian statehood =

The idea of establishing a Palestinian state in the West Bank and Gaza Strip has evolved through various proposals and disputes. During the British mandate period, numerous territorial and constitutional models were proposed for Palestine, none of them winning the agreement of all parties. In 1947, the United Nations Partition Plan for Palestine was voted for. The leaders of the Jewish Agency for Palestine accepted parts of the plan, while Arab leaders refused it. This triggered the 1947–1949 Palestine war and led, in 1948, to the establishment of the state of Israel on a part of Mandate Palestine as the Mandate came to an end.

The Gaza Strip came under Egyptian occupation, and the West Bank was ruled by Jordan, before both territories were occupied by Israel in the 1967 Six-Day War. Since then there have been proposals to establish a Palestinian state. In 1969, for example, the Palestine Liberation Organization (PLO) proposed the establishment of a binational state over the whole of the former British Mandate territory. This proposal was rejected by Israel, as it would have amounted to the disbanding of the state of Israel. The basis of the current proposals is for a two-state solution on either a portion of or the entirety of the Palestinian territories—the Gaza Strip and the West Bank, including East Jerusalem, which have been occupied by Israel since 1967.

== Background ==
=== From prehistory to the Ottoman era ===
The region of Palestine is part of the Levant, a land bridge between Africa and Eurasia that has traditionally served as the "crossroads of Western Asia, the Eastern Mediterranean, and Northeast Africa". Lying to the west of the Jordan Rift Valley, Palestine is, in tectonic terms, located in the "northwest of the Arabian Plate".

A crossroads for religion, culture, commerce, and politics, Palestine was among the earliest regions to see human habitation, agricultural communities and civilization. In the Bronze Age, the Canaanites established city-states influenced by surrounding civilizations, among them Egypt, which ruled the area in the Late Bronze Age. During the Iron Age, the kingdoms of Israel and Judah, emerged in the interior, while kingdoms belonging to Philistia and Phoenicia ruled the Palestinian coast. The Assyrians conquered the region in the 8th century BCE, then the Babylonians c. 601 BCE, followed by the Persian Achaemenid Empire that conquered the Babylonian Empire in 539 BCE. Alexander the Great conquered the Persian Empire in the late 330s BCE, intensifying Hellenizing influences.

In the late 2nd-century BCE Maccabean Revolt, the Jewish Hasmonean Kingdom conquered most of Palestine; the kingdom subsequently became a vassal of Rome, which annexed it in 63 BCE. Roman Judea was troubled by Jewish revolts in 66 CE, so Rome destroyed Jerusalem and the Second Jewish Temple in 70 CE. In the 4th century, as the Roman Empire adopted Christianity, Palestine became a center for the religion, attracting pilgrims, monks and scholars. Following Muslim conquest of the Levant in 636–641, ruling dynasties succeeded each other: the Rashiduns; Umayyads; Abbasids; the semi-independent Tulunids and Ikhshidids; Fatimids; and the Seljuks. In 1099, the First Crusade resulted in Crusaders establishing of the Kingdom of Jerusalem, which was reconquered by the Ayyubid Sultanate in 1187. Following the invasion of the Mongol Empire in the late 1250s, the Egyptian Mamluks reunified Palestine under its control, before the region was conquered by the Ottoman Empire in 1516, being ruled as Ottoman Syria until the 20th century largely without dispute.

=== British mandate period ===
Three proposals for the post World War I administration of Palestine: "International Administration" proposed in the 1916 Sykes–Picot Agreement 1919 Zionist Organization proposal at the Paris Peace Conference Final borders of the 1923–48 Mandatory Palestine

The rise of Zionism in the late 19th and early 20th centuries saw a growing stream of Jewish immigration into Palestine. In 1917, during World War I, the British Government issued the Balfour Declaration which declared British support for the creation in Palestine of a "national home for the Jewish people". While the declaration was enthusiastically received by many Jews worldwide, the British Government was quick to point out that it spoke of a home, making no promise of a state. It was nevertheless opposed by Palestinian and Arab leaders, who later claimed that the objective was a breach of promises made to the Sharif of Mecca in 1915, in exchange for Arabs helping to fight the Ottoman Empire during the war.

The defeat of the Ottoman Empire in World War I resulted in the dismantling of their rule. In 1920, the League of Nations granted Britain the mandate to govern Palestine, leading to the subsequent period of British administration.

Many different proposals have been made and continue to be made to resolve the dilemma of the competing objectives, including an Arab state, with or without a significant Jewish population, a Jewish state, with or without a significant Arab population, a single bi-national state, with or without some degree of cantonization, two states, one bi-national and one Arab, with or without some form of federation, and two states, one Jewish and one Arab, with or without some form of federation.

At the same times, many Arab leaders maintained that Palestine should join a larger Arab state covering the imprecise region of the Levant. These hopes were expressed in the Faisal–Weizmann Agreement, which was signed by soon-to-be Iraqi ruler Faisal I and the Zionist leader Chaim Weizmann. Despite this, the promise of a Pan-Arab state including Palestine were dashed as Syria, Lebanon, and Jordan declared independence from their European rulers, while western Palestine festered in the developing Arab-Jewish conflict.

In light of these developments, Arabs began calling for both their own state in the British Mandate of Palestine and an end to the British support of the Jewish homeland's creation and to Jewish immigration. The movement gained steam through the 1920s and 1930s as Jewish immigration picked up. Under pressure from the arising nationalist movement, the British enforced the White Papers, a series of laws greatly restricting Jewish immigration and the sale of lands to Jews. The laws, passed in 1922, 1930, and 1939, varied in severity, but all attempted to find a balance between British sympathies with the Jews and the Arabs.

==== McMahon–Hussein Correspondence (1915–16) ====
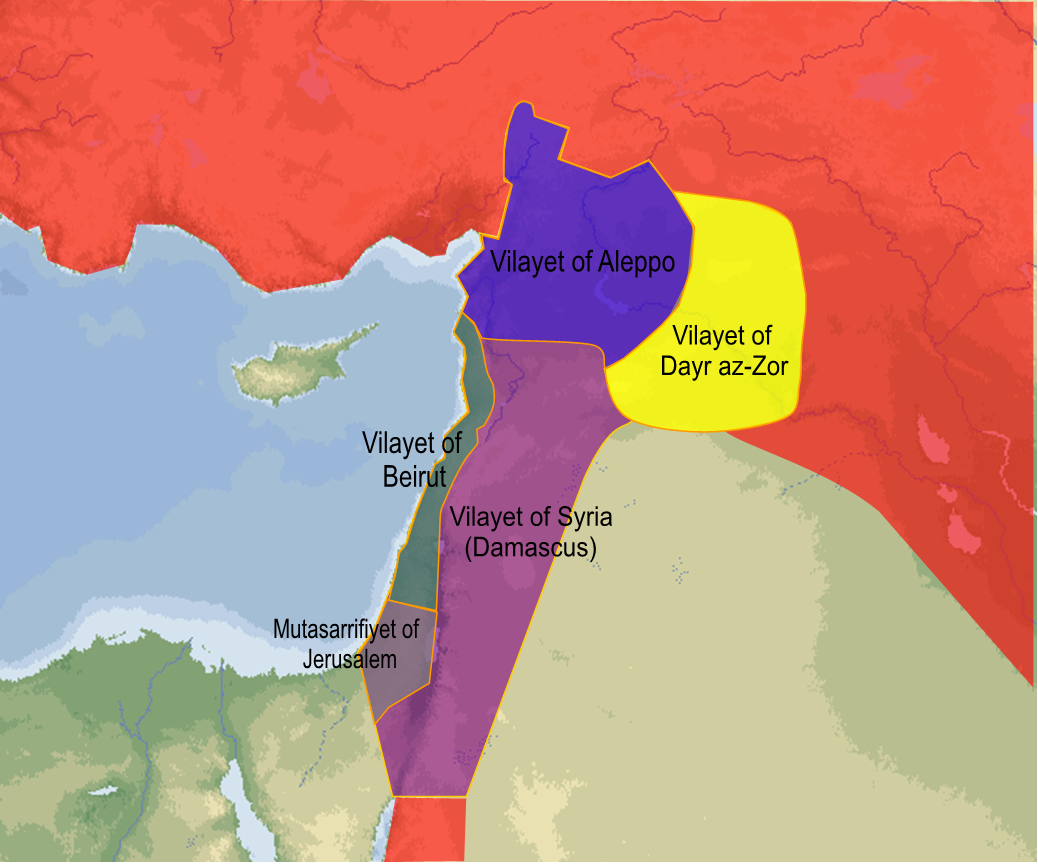
Administrative units in the Levant under the Ottoman Empire, until c. 1918

In the early years of World War I, negotiations took place between the British High Commissioner in Egypt Henry McMahon and Sharif of Mecca Husayn bin Ali for an alliance of sorts between the Allies and the Arabs in the Near East against the Ottomans. On 24 October 1915, McMahon sent to Hussein a note which the Arabs came to regard as their "Declaration of Independence". In McMahon's letter, part of the McMahon–Hussein Correspondence, McMahon declared Britain's willingness to recognise the independence of the Arabs, both in the Levant and the Hejaz, subject to certain exemptions. It stated on behalf of the Government of Great Britain that:

The two districts of Mersina and Alexandretta and portions of Syria lying to the west of the districts of Damascus, Homs, Hama and Aleppo cannot be said to be purely Arab, and should be excluded from the limits demanded.

With the above modification, and without prejudice of our existing treaties with Arab chiefs, we accept those limits.

As for those regions lying within those frontiers wherein Great Britain is free to act without detriment to the interest of her ally, France, I am empowered in the name of the Government of Great Britain to give the following assurances and make the following reply to your letter:

1. Subject to the above modifications, Great Britain is prepared to recognize and support the independence of the Arabs in all the regions within the limits demanded by the Sherif of Mecca.

The exemptions from Arab control of certain areas set out in the McMahon note were to seriously complicate the problems of peace in the Near East. At the time, the Arab portions of the Ottoman Empire were divided into administrative units called vilayets and sanjaks. Palestine was divided into the sanjuks of Acre and Nablus, both of which were a part of the vilayet of Beirut, and an independent sanjak of Jerusalem. The areas exempted from Arab control by the McMahon note included "Syria lying to the west of the districts of Damascus, Homs, Hama, and Aleppo." Between 1916 and 1920, the British government interpreted these commitments as including Palestine in the Arab area. However, in the Churchill White Paper they argued instead that "Damascus" meant the vilayet and not the city of Damascus, and accordingly virtually all of Palestine was excluded from Arab control. The British entered into the secret Sykes–Picot Agreement on 16 May 1916 and the commitment of the Balfour Declaration, for example, on that understanding.

The Arabs, however, insisted at the 1919 Paris Peace Conference at the end of the war that "Damascus" meant the city of Damascus – which left Palestine in their hands. However, in 1915, these problems of interpretation did not occur to Hussein, who agreed to the British wording.

Despite Arab objections based in part on the Arab interpretation of the McMahon correspondence noted above, Britain was given the League of Nations Mandate for Palestine. The Mandate was administered as two territories: Palestine and Transjordan, with the Jordan River being the boundary between them. The boundaries under the Mandate also did not follow those sought by the Jewish community, which sought the inclusion of the east bank of the Jordan into the Palestinian territory, to which the objective of the Mandate for a homeland for the Jewish people would apply. It was made clear from before the commencement of the Mandate, and a clause to that effect was inserted in the Mandate, that the objective set out in the Mandate would not apply to Transjordan following the passing of the Transjordan memorandum. Transjordan was destined for early independence. The objective of the Mandate was to apply only to territory west of the Jordan, which was commonly referred to as Palestine by the British administration, and as Eretz Israel by the Hebrew-speaking Jewish population.

==== Peel Commission (1936–37) ====
Peel Commission, partition plan A, November 1937

During the 1936–39 Arab revolt in Palestine the British government formed the Peel Commission, which recommended the formation of a Jewish and an Arab state. It called for a small Jewish state in the Galilee and maritime strip, a British enclave stretching from Jerusalem to Jaffa, and an Arab state covering the rest. The Commission recommended the creation of a small Jewish state in a region less than 1/5 of the total area of Palestine. The Arab area was to be joined to Transjordan. The Arab population in the Jewish areas was to be removed, by force if necessary, and vice versa, although this would mean the movement of far more Arabs than Jews. The Zionist Congress rejected the proposal, while allowing the leadership to continue negotiating with the British. The Arab leadership rejected the proposal outright. It all came to nothing, as the British government shelved the proposal altogether by the middle of 1938.

In February 1939, the St. James Conference convened in London, but the Arab delegation refused to formally meet with its Jewish counterpart or to recognize them. The Conference ended on March 17, 1939, without making any progress. On May 17, 1939, the British government issued the White Paper of 1939, in which the idea of partitioning the Mandate was abandoned in favor of Jews and Arabs sharing one government and put strict quotas on further Jewish immigration. Because of impending World War II and the opposition from all sides, the plan was dropped.

World War II (1939–1945) gave a boost to the Jewish nationalism, as the Holocaust reaffirmed their call for a Jewish homeland. At the same time, many Arab leaders had even supported Nazi Germany, a fact which could not play well with the British. As a result, Britain pooled its energy into winning over Arab opinions by abandoning the Balfour Declaration and the terms of the League of Nations mandate which had been entrusted to it in order to create a "Jewish National Home". Britain did this by issuing the 1939 white paper which officially allowed a further 75,000 Jews to move over five years (10,000 a year plus an additional 25,000) which was to be followed by Arab majority independence. The British would later claim that that quota had already been fulfilled by those who had entered without its approval.

==== The Arab League and the Arab Higher Committee (1945) ====
The framers of the Arab League sought to include the Palestinian Arabs within the framework of the League from its inception. An annex to the League Pact declared:

Even though Palestine was not able to control her own destiny, it was on the basis of the recognition of her independence that the Covenant of the League of Nations determined a system of government for her. Her existence and her independence among the nations can, therefore, no more be questioned de jure than the independence of any of the other Arab States... Therefore, the States signatory to the Pact of the Arab League consider that in view of Palestine's special circumstances, the Council of the League should designate an Arab delegate from Palestine to participate in its work until this country enjoys actual independence.

In November 1945, the Arab League reconstituted the Arab Higher Committee comprising twelve members as the supreme executive body of Palestinian Arabs in the territory of the British Mandate of Palestine. The committee was dominated by the Palestine Arab Party and was immediately recognised by Arab League countries. The Mandate government recognised the new Committee two months later. The Constitution of the League of Arab States says the existence and independence of Palestine cannot be questioned de jure even though the outward signs of this independence have remained veiled as a result of force majeure.

In 1946, Jewish leaders – including Nahum Goldmann, Rabbi Abba Silver, Moshe Shertok, and David Ben-Gurion – proposed a union between Arab Palestine and Transjordan. Also in 1946, leaders of the Zionist movement in the U.S. sought the postponement of a determination of the application by Transjordan for United Nations membership until the status of Mandate Palestine as a whole was determined. However, at its final session the League of Nations recognized the independence of Transjordan, with the agreement of Britain.

In April 1947, during the activity of the United Nations Special Committee on Palestine, the Arab Higher Committee articulated its demands in the solution for the Question of Palestine:

1. A complete cessation of the Jewish migration to Palestine.
2. A total halt to the sale of land to Jews
3. Cancelation of the British Mandate in Palestine and the Balfour Declaration.
4. Recognition of the right of Arabs to their land and recognition of the independence of Palestine as a sovereign state, like all other Arab states, with a promise to provide minority rights to the Jews according to the rules of Democracy.

==== 1947 UN Partition Plan ====
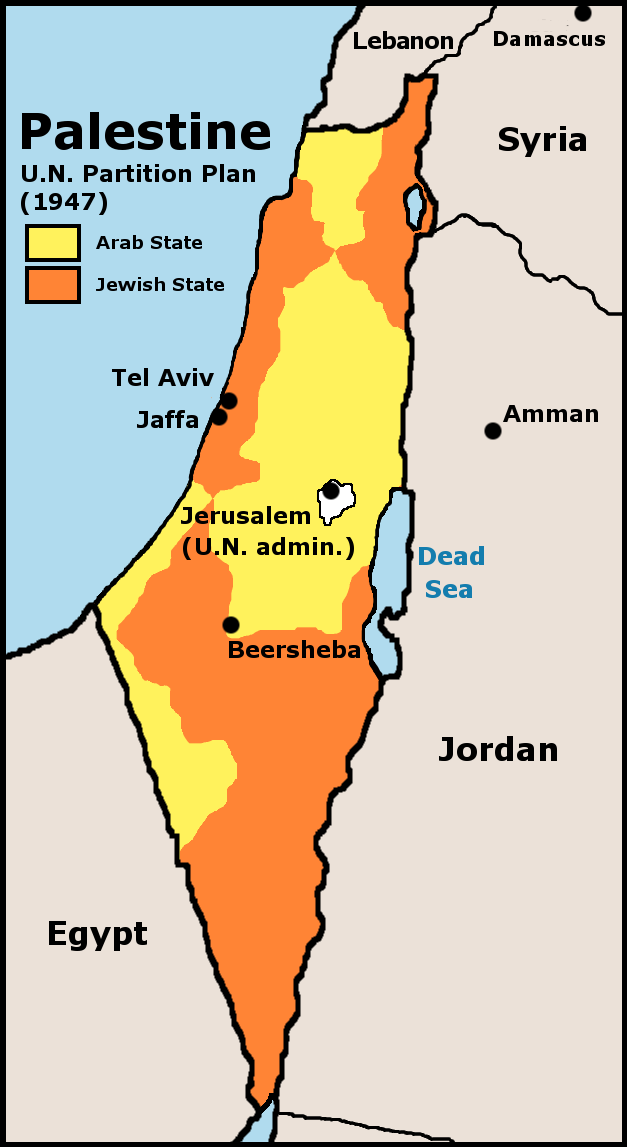
Map of the UN Partition plan

Boundaries defined in the 1947 UN Partition Plan for Palestine: Area assigned for a Jewish state Area assigned for an Arab state Planned Corpus separatum with the intention that Jerusalem would be neither Jewish nor Arab Armistice Demarcation Lines of 1949 (Green Line): Israel per 1949 armistice lines West Jerusalem and other areas under Israeli control from 1949 Gaza and the West Bank (including East Jerusalem) under Egyptian and Jordanian control till 1967

In 1947, the United Nations created the United Nations Special Committee on Palestine (UNSCOP) to find an immediate solution to the Palestine question, which the British had handed over to the UN. The report indicated that the Arab state would be forced to call for financial assistance "from international institutions in the way of loans for expansion of education, public health and other vital social services of a non-self-supporting nature." A technical note from the Secretariat explained that without some redistribution of customs from the Jewish state, Arab Palestine would not be economically viable. The committee was satisfied that the proposed Jewish State and the City of Jerusalem would be viable. The majority of the members of UNSCOP proposed certain recommendations for the UN General Assembly which on 29 November 1947 adopted a resolution recommending the adoption and implementation of the Partition Plan, based substantially on those proposals as Resolution 181(II). PART I: Future constitution and government of Palestine: A. Clause 3. provided as follows:- Independent Arab and Jewish States and the Special International Regime for the City of Jerusalem, set forth in part III of this plan, shall come into existence in Palestine two months after the evacuation of the armed forces of the mandatory Power has been completed but in any case not later than 1 October 1948. The resolution noted Britain's planned termination of the British Mandate for Palestine and recommended the partition of Palestine into two states, one Arab and one Jewish, with the Jerusalem-Bethlehem area being under special international protection, administered by the United Nations. The resolution included a highly detailed description of the recommended boundaries for each proposed state. The resolution also contained a plan for an economic union between the proposed states, and a plan for the protection of religious and minority rights. The resolution sought to address the conflicting objectives and claims to the Mandate territory of two competing nationalist movements, Zionism (Jewish nationalism) and Arab nationalism, as well as to resolve the plight of Jews displaced as a result of the Holocaust. The resolution called for the withdrawal of British forces and termination of the Mandate by 1 August 1948, and establishment of the new independent states by 1 October 1948.

The leaders of the Jewish Agency for Palestine accepted the plan, while Arab leaders refused it.

In the October 1947 Arab League conference in Aley, the Arab states rejected the option of establishing an interim Palestinian Arab government and the Lebanese prime minister Riad Al Solh in particular told Hajj Amin al-Husseini that if a Palestinian Arab government will be established, he couldn't be part of it. Abdul Rahman Hassan Azzam wanted the Arab League to manage the Arab struggle in Palestine.

King Abdullah I of Jordan met with a delegation headed by Golda Meir (who later became Prime Minister of Israel in 1968) to negotiate terms for accepting the partition plan, but rejected its proposal that Jordan remain neutral. Indeed, the king knew that the nascent Palestinian state would soon be absorbed by its Arab neighbors, and therefore had a vested interest in being party to the imminent war.

==== Civil war 1947–48 ====
Soon after the UN resolution, less than half a year prior to the expiration of the British Mandate, large-scale fighting broke out between the Arab and Jewish communities in Palestine. By the time Israel declared its independence on 14 May 1948, the result of these five and a half months of fighting was, according to historian Benny Morris, a "decisive Jewish victory". On one side, the "Palestinian Arab military power was crushed" and most of the Arab population in the combat zones was fleeing or had been driven out. On the other side, the "Haganah transformed from a militia into an army" and succeeded "in consolidating its hold on a continuous strip of territory embracing the Coastal Plain, the Jezreel Valley, and the Jordan Valley". The Yishuv (the Jewish community and its "state-in-waiting"-type organisations) proved it had the capability to defend itself, persuading the United States and the remainder of the world to support it and the "victory over the Palestinian Arabs gave the Haganah the experience and self-confidence [...] to confront [...] the invading armies of the Arab states."

On 12 April 1948, the Arab League announced:

The Arab armies shall enter Palestine to rescue it. His Majesty (King Farouk, representing the League) would like to make it clearly understood that such measures should be looked upon as temporary and devoid of any character of the occupation or partition of Palestine, and that after completion of its liberation, that country would be handed over to its owners to rule in the way they like.

=== 1948 war until 1988 ===
==== Arab–Israeli War (1948) ====
On May 14, 1948, at the end of the British Mandate, the Jewish People's Council gathered in Tel Aviv and the chairman of the Jewish Agency for Palestine, declared the establishment of a Jewish state in Eretz-Israel, to be known as the State of Israel. U.S. President Harry Truman recognised the State of Israel de facto the following day. The Arab countries declared war on the newly formed State of Israel heralding the start of the 1948 Arab–Israeli War.

Armies of the neighbouring Arab states entered the former Mandate territories the next day starting the 1948 Arab–Israeli War. But some of the leaders of these countries had plans of their own for Palestine. As the Palestinian writer Hisham Sharabi would observe, Palestine had "disappeared from the map".

As a result of the war, Egypt occupied the Gaza Strip, and on September 22, 1948, formed the All-Palestine Government in Gaza, partly as an Arab League move to limit the influence of Jordan over the Palestinian issue. The former mufti of Jerusalem, Haj Amin al-Husseini, was appointed president. The Palestinian National Council declared an independent Palestinian state on October 1, 1948 in all of Palestine region with Jerusalem as its capital. This government was recognised by Egypt, Syria, Lebanon, Iraq, Saudi Arabia, and Yemen, but not by Jordan or any non-Arab country. However, it was little more than a facade under Egyptian control and had negligible influence or funding. Egypt did not permit unrestricted entry of Palestinians from Gaza into Egypt proper, and vice versa. In 1959, Gamal Abdel Nasser, president of Egypt, dissolved the All-Palestine government to rule the Gaza Strip directly.

King Abdullah I of Jordan sent the Arab Legion into the West Bank with no intention of withdrawing it following the war. Jordan annexed the West Bank, including East Jerusalem, granting citizenship to the Arab refugees and residents living in the West Bank against the objection of many Arab leaders who still hoped to establish an Arab state of Palestine. The country's name was changed in 1949 from Transjordan to Jordan and Palestinians were given seats in the Jordanian Parliament. A royal decree in March 1949 forbade the use of the term "Palestine" in legal documents, and other measures were designed to emphasize that there would not be an independent Palestine. He also banned any opinion contrary to unification of the two territories and outlawed all All-Palestine Government activity within territories under his control.

After the war, which the Israelis call the War of Independence and the Palestinians call the Catastrophe, the 1949 Armistice Agreements established the separation lines between the combatants, leaving Israel in control of some of the areas which had been designated for the Arab state under the Partition Plan, Transjordan in control of the West Bank, Egypt in control of the Gaza Strip and Syria in control of the Himmah Area. The Arab League "supervised" the Egyptian trusteeship of the Palestinian government in Gaza after and secured assurances from Jordan that the 1950 Act of Union was "without prejudice to the final settlement".

==== Jordanian West Bank ====
King Abdullah I of Jordan annexed the West Bank, granting citizenship to the Arab refugees and residents against the wishes of many Arab leaders who still hoped to establish an Arab state. Under Abdullah's leadership, Arab hopes of independence were dealt a severe blow. In March he issued a royal decree forbidding the use of the term "Palestine" in any legal documents, and pursued other measures designed to make the fact that there would not be an independent Palestine clear and certain.

During the 1948 Arab–Israeli War, Transjordan occupied the area of Cisjordan, now called the West Bank (including East Jerusalem), which it continued to control in accordance with the 1949 Armistice Agreements and a political union formed in December 1948. Military Proclamation Number 2 of 1948 provided for the application in the West Bank of laws that were applicable in Palestine on the eve of the termination of the Mandate. On 2 November 1948, the military rule was replaced by a civilian administration by virtue of the Law Amending Public Administration Law in Palestine. Military Proclamation Number 17 of 1949, Section 2, vested the King of Jordan with all the powers that were enjoyed by the King of England, his ministers and the High Commissioner of Palestine by the Palestine Order-in-Council, 1922. Section 5 of this law confirmed that all laws, regulations and orders that were applicable in Palestine until the termination of the Mandate would remain in force until repealed or amended.

The Second Arab-Palestinian Congress was held in Jericho on 1 December 1948 at the end of the war. The delegates proclaimed Abdullah King of Palestine and called for a union of Arab Palestine with the Hashemite Kingdom of Transjordan. Avi Plascov says that Abdullah contacted the Nashashibi opposition, local mayors, mukhars, those opposed to the Husaynis, and opposition members of the AHC. Plascov said that the Palestinian Congresses were conducted in accordance with prevailing Arab custom. He also said that contrary to the widely held belief outside Jordan the representatives did reflect the feelings of a large segment of the population.

The Transjordanian Government agreed to the unification on 7 December 1948, and on 13 December the Transjordanian parliament approved the creation of the Hashemite Kingdom of Jordan. The change of status was reflected by the adoption of this new official name on 21 January 1949. Unification was ratified by a joint Jordanian National Assembly on 24 April 1950 which comprised twenty representatives each from the East and West Bank. The Act of Union contained a protective clause which preserved Arab rights in Palestine "without prejudice to any final settlement".

Many legal scholars say the declaration of the Arab League and the Act of Union implied that Jordan's claim of sovereignty was provisional, because it had always been subject to the emergence of the Palestinian state. A political union was legally established by the series of proclamations, decrees, and parliamentary acts in December 1948. Abdullah thereupon took the title King of Jordan, and he officially changed the country's name to the Hashemite Kingdom of Jordan in April 1949. The 1950 Act of Union confirmed and ratified King Abdullah's actions. Following the annexation of the West Bank, only two countries formally recognized the union: Britain and Pakistan. Thomas Kuttner notes that de facto recognition was granted to the regime, most clearly evidenced by the maintaining of consulates in East Jerusalem by several countries, including the United States. Joseph Weiler agreed, and said that other states had engaged in activities, statements, and resolutions that would be inconsistent with non-recognition. Joseph Massad said that the members of the Arab League granted de facto recognition and that the United States had formally recognized the annexation, except for Jerusalem. The policy of the U.S. Department, was stated in a paper on the subject prepared for the Foreign Ministers meetings in London in May was in favor of the incorporation of Central Palestine into Jordan, but desired that it be done gradually and not by sudden proclamation. Once the annexation took place, the department approved of the action "in the sense that it represents a logical development of the situation which took place as a result of a free expression of the will of the people.... The United States continued to wish to avoid a public expression of approval of the union."

The United States government extended de jure recognition to the Government of Transjordan and the Government of Israel on the same day, 31 January 1949. U.S. President Truman told King Abdullah that the policy of the U.S. as regards a final territorial settlement in Palestine had been stated in the General Assembly on 30 November 1948 by the American representative. The U.S. supported Israeli claims to the boundaries set forth in the UN General Assembly resolution of 29 November 1947, but believed that if Israel sought to retain additional territory in Palestine allotted to the Arabs, it should give the Arabs territorial compensation. Clea Bunch said that "President Truman crafted a balanced policy between Israel and its moderate Hashemite neighbours when he simultaneously extended formal recognition to the newly created state of Israel and the Kingdom of Transjordan. These two nations were inevitably linked in the President's mind as twin emergent states: one serving the needs of the refugee Jew, the other absorbing recently displaced Palestinian Arabs. Truman was aware of the private agreements that existed between Jewish Agency leaders and King Abdullah I of Jordan. Thus, it made perfect sense to Truman to favour both states with de jure recognition."

Sandra Berliant Kadosh analyzed U.S. policy toward the West Bank in 1948, based largely on the Foreign Relations Documents of the United States. She noted that the U.S. government believed that the most satisfactory solution regarding the disposition of the greater part of Arab Palestine would be incorporation in Transjordan and that the State Department approved the Principle underlying the Jericho resolutions. Kadosh said that the delegates claimed to represent 90 percent of the population, and that they ridiculed the Gaza government. They asserted that it represented only its eighty-odd members.

==== All-Palestine ====
In Gaza, the All-Palestine Government was formed prior to the war's end in September 1948. The government, under the leadership of the Mufti of Jerusalem Mohammad Amin al-Husayni, declared the independence of the Palestinian state, with Jerusalem as its capital. The All-Palestine Government would go on to be recognized by Egypt, Syria, Lebanon, Iraq, Saudi Arabia, and Yemen, while Jordan and the other Arab states refused to recognize it.

Egypt supervised the government of Palestine in Gaza as a trustee on behalf of the Arab League. An Egyptian Ministerial order dated 1 June 1948 declared that all laws in force during the Mandate would continue to be in force in the Gaza Strip. Another order issued on 8 August 1948 vested an Egyptian Administrator-General with the powers of the High Commissioner. The All-Palestine Government had very limited power however, as Egypt maintained control over Gaza's administration. The All-Palestine Government was under official Egyptian protection, but on the other hand it had no executive role, but rather mostly political and symbolic. Its importance gradually declined, especially with the government seat relocation from Gaza to Cairo in December 1948.

Shortly thereafter, the Jericho Conference named King Abdullah I of Transjordan, "King of Arab Palestine". The Congress called for the union of Arab Palestine and Transjordan and Abdullah announced his intention to annex the West Bank. The other Arab League member states opposed Abdullah's plan.

The U.S. advised the Arab states that the U.S. attitude regarding Israel had been clearly stated in the UN by Dr. Jessup on 20 November 1949. He said that the U.S. supported Israeli claims to the boundaries set forth in the UN General Assembly resolution. However, the U.S. believed that if Israel sought to retain additional territory in Palestine it should give the Arabs other territory as compensation. The Israelis agreed that the boundaries were negotiable, but did not agree to the principle of compensation as a precondition. Israel's Foreign Minister Eban stressed that it was undesirable to undermine what had already been accomplished by the armistice agreements, and maintained that Israel held no territory wrongfully, since her occupation of the areas had been sanctioned by the armistice agreements, as had the occupation of the territory in Palestine held by the Arab states.

In a diplomatic conversation held on 5 June 1950 between Stuart W. Rockwell of the State Department's Office of African and Near Eastern Affairs and Abdel Monem Rifai, a Counselor of the Jordan Legation. Rifai asked when the U.S. was going to recognize the union of Arab Palestine and Jordan. Rockwell explained the Department's position, stating that it was not the custom of the U.S. to issue formal statements of recognition every time a foreign country changed its territorial area. The union of Arab Palestine and Jordan had been brought about as a result of the will of the people and the U.S. accepted the fact that Jordanian sovereignty had been extended to the new area. Rifai said he had not realized this and that he was very pleased to learn that the U.S. did in fact recognize the union. The U.S. State Department published this memorandum of conversation in 1978.

In 1957, the Basic Law of Gaza established a Legislative Council that could pass laws which were given to the High Administrator-General for approval. In 1959, Egyptian president Gamal Abdul Nasser ordered the dismantling of the All-Palestine Protectorate for good. In March 1962, a Constitution for the Gaza Strip was issued confirming the role of the Legislative Council. The All-Palestine Protectorate is regarded by some as the first attempt to establish an independent Palestinian state, whilst most just saw it as an Egyptian puppet, only to be annulled a few years after its creation by no less than President Gamal Abdel Nasser of Egypt.

==== Six-Day War (1967) ====
In June 1967, Israel captured and occupied the West Bank, including East Jerusalem, from Jordan, the Gaza Strip and Sinai Peninsula from Egypt, and the area of Golan Heights from Syria as a result of the Six-Day War. Israel, which was ordered to withdraw from territories occupied during the war in exchange for Arab recognition and the negotiation of final borders by United Nations Security Council Resolution 242, unilaterally annexed East Jerusalem and later applied Israeli civil law to the Golan Heights. On 9 June 1967, Israeli Foreign Minister Eban assured the U.S. that it was not seeking territorial aggrandizement and had no "colonial" aspirations. U.S. Secretary of State Dean Rusk stressed to Israel that no settlement with Jordan would be accepted by the global community unless it gave Jordan some special position in the Old City of Jerusalem. The U.S. also assumed Jordan would receive the bulk of the West Bank as that was regarded as Jordanian territory.

The international community considers the West Bank, including East Jerusalem, held under military occupation by Israel subject to the Fourth Geneva Convention. Israel does not accept that the Fourth Geneva Convention applies de jure, but has stated that on humanitarian issues it will govern itself de facto by its provisions, without specifying which these are. The Gaza Strip is still considered to be occupied by the United Nations, international human rights organisations, and the majority of governments and legal commentators, despite the 2005 Israeli disengagement from Gaza.

On 3 November 1967, U.S. Ambassador Goldberg called on King Hussein of Jordan, saying that the U.S. was committed to the principle of political independence and territorial integrity and was ready to reaffirm it bilaterally and publicly in the Security Council resolution. According to Goldberg, the U.S. believed in territorial integrity, withdrawal, and recognition of secure boundaries. Goldberg said the principle of territorial integrity has two important sub-principles, there must be a withdrawal to recognized and secure frontiers for all countries, not necessarily the old armistice lines, and there must be mutuality in adjustments.

The U.S. President's Special Assistant, Walt Rostow, told Israeli ambassador Harmon that he had already stressed to Foreign Minister Eban that the U.S. expected the thrust of the settlement would be toward security and demilitarisation arrangements rather than toward major changes in the armistice lines. Harmon said the Israeli position was that Jerusalem should be an open city under unified administration, but that the Jordanian interest in Jerusalem could be met through arrangements including "sovereignty". Rostow said the U.S. government assumed (and Harman confirmed) that despite public statements to the contrary, the Government of Israel position on Jerusalem was that which Eban, Harman, and Evron had given several times, that Jerusalem was negotiable.

Following the outbreak of fighting in Jordan in September 1970 between the Jordanian army and Palestinian guerillas, the US government began considering the creation of a separate Palestinian political entity. However, a Palestinian state was the least considered alternative. A State Department memo of 1970 stated in that regard:

such a state would presumably have to be limited to the West Bank and Gaza, it would probably not be economically viable without the injection of large-scale outside financial assistance. Its political viability is also doubtful, since a large number of Palestinians would remain outside its borders and it would tend to be dominated by a larger and more powerful Israel.

==== PLO and the binational state solution ====
Before the Six-Day War, the movement for an independent Palestine received a boost in 1964 when the Palestine Liberation Organization was established. Its goal, as stated in the Palestinian National Covenant was to create a Palestinian state in the whole British Mandate, a statement which nullified Israel's right to exist. The PLO would become the leading force in the Palestinian national movement politically, and its leader, Egyptian-born Yassir Arafat, would become regarded as the leader of the Palestinian people.

In 1969, the Fatah movement, accepting as a fait accompli the presence in Palestine of a large number of Jews, declared that it was not fighting against Jews, but against Israel as a racist and theocratic entity. The fifth national council of the Palestine Liberation Organisation in February 1969 passed a resolution confirming that the PLO's objective was "to establish a free and democratic society in Palestine for all Palestinians whether they are Muslims, Christians or Jews". The PLO was not successful in building support for the binational solution within Israeli society, however, which lay the groundwork for an eventual re-scoping of the PLO's aim toward partition into two states.

==== Rift between Jordan and Palestinian leadership (1970) ====
After the events of Black September in Jordan, the rift between the Palestinian leadership and the Kingdom of Jordan continued to widen. The Arab League affirmed the right of the Palestinian people to self-determination and called on all the Arab states, including Jordan, to undertake to defend Palestinian national unity and not to interfere in internal Palestinian affairs. The Arab League also 'affirmed the right of the Palestinian people to establish an independent national authority under the command of the Palestine Liberation Organization, the sole legitimate representative of the Palestinian people in any Palestinian territory that is liberated.' King Ḥussein dissolved the Jordanian parliament. Half of its members had been West Bank representatives. He renounced Jordanian claims to the West Bank, and allowed the PLO to assume responsibility as the Provisional Government of Palestine. The Kingdom of Jordan, Egypt, and Syria no longer act as the legitimate representatives of the Palestinian people, or their territory.

==== Ten Point Program ====
In 1974, the PLO adopted the Ten Point Program, which called for the establishment of an Israeli-Palestinian democratic, binational state (a one state solution). It also called for the establishment of Palestinian rule on "any part" of its liberated territory, as a step towards "completing the liberation of all Palestinian territory, and as a step along the road to comprehensive Arab unity." While this was not seen by Israel as a significant moderation of PLO policy, the phrasing was extremely controversial within the PLO itself, where it was widely regarded as a move towards a two-state solution. The adoption of the program, under pressure from Arafat's Fatah faction and some minor groups (e.g. DFLP, al-Sa'iqa) led many hard-line groups to break away from the Arafat and the mainstream PLO members, forming the Rejectionist Front. To some extent, this split is still evident today. Declassified diplomatic documents reveal that in 1974, on the eve of the UN debate that granted the PLO an observer status, some parts of the PLO leadership were considering to proclaim the formation of a Palestinian government in exile at some point. This plan, however, was not carried out.

At the Rabat summit conference in 1974, Jordan and the other members of the Arab League declared that the Palestine Liberation Organization was the "sole legitimate representative of the [Arab] Palestinian people", thereby relinquishing to that organization its role as representative of the West Bank.

During the 1978 Camp David negotiations between Israel and Egypt Anwar Sadat proposed the creation of a Palestinian state in the West Bank and Gaza. Israel refused.

In a speech delivered on 1 September 1982, U.S. President Ronald Reagan called for a settlement freeze and continued to support full Palestinian autonomy in political union with Jordan. He also said that "It is the United States' position that – in return for peace – the withdrawal provision of Resolution 242 applies to all fronts, including the West Bank and Gaza."

The Amman Agreement of 11 February 1985, declared that the PLO and Jordan would pursue a proposed confederation between the state of Jordan and a Palestinian state. In 1988, King Hussein dissolved the Jordanian parliament and renounced Jordanian claims to the West Bank. The PLO assumed responsibility as the Provisional Government of Palestine and an independent state was declared.

== Timeline ==
=== Declaration of the state in 1988 ===
The declaration of a State of Palestine (Arabic: دولة فلسطين) took place in Algiers on November 15, 1988, by the Palestinian National Council, the legislative body of the Palestine Liberation Organization (PLO). It was approved by the Palestinian National Council (PNC) by a vote of 253 in favour, 46 against and 10 abstentions. It was read by Yasser Arafat at the closing session of the 19th PNC to a standing ovation. Upon completing the reading of the declaration, Arafat, as Chairman of the Palestine Liberation Organization assumed the title of "President of Palestine". By the 1988 declaration, the PNC empowered its central council to form a government-in-exile when appropriate, and called upon its executive committee to perform the duties of the government-in-exile until its establishment.

The borders of the state were not specified. Jordan extended recognition to the state and ceded its claim to the West Bank to the Palestinian Liberation Organisation, which had been previously designated by the Arab League as the "sole legitimate representative of the Palestinian people".

The Palestinian National Authority (PNA), the United States, the European Union, and the Arab League, envision the establishment of a State of Palestine to include all or part of the West Bank, the Gaza Strip, and East Jerusalem, living in peace with Israel under a democratically elected and transparent government. The PNA, however, does not claim sovereignty over any territory and therefore is not the government of the State of Palestine proclaimed in 1988.

Palestinian flag

Referring to "the historical injustice inflicted on the Palestinian Arab people resulting in their dispersion and depriving them of their right to self-determination," the declaration recalled the Treaty of Lausanne (1923) and UN General Assembly Resolution 181 (1947 Partition Plan) as supporting the rights of Palestinians and Palestine. The declaration then proclaims a "State of Palestine on our Palestinian territory with its capital Jerusalem". The borders of the declared State of Palestine were not specified. The population of the state was referred to by the statement: "The State of Palestine is the state of Palestinians wherever they may be". The state was defined as an Arab country by the statement: "The State of Palestine is an Arab state, an integral and indivisible part of the Arab nation". The declaration was accompanied by a PNC call for multilateral negotiations on the basis of UN Security Council Resolution 242. This call was later termed "the Historic Compromise", as it implied acceptance of the "two-state solution", namely that it no longer questioned the legitimacy of the State of Israel. The PNC's political communiqué accompanying the declaration called only for withdrawal from "Arab Jerusalem" and the other "Arab territories occupied." Arafat's statements in Geneva a month later were accepted by the United States as sufficient to remove the ambiguities it saw in the declaration and to fulfill the longheld conditions for open dialogue with the United States.

As a result of the declaration, the United Nations General Assembly (UNGA) convened, inviting Arafat, Chairman of the PLO to give an address. An UNGA resolution was adopted "acknowledging the proclamation of the State of Palestine by the Palestine National Council on 15 November 1988," and it was further decided that "the designation 'Palestine' should be used in place of the designation 'Palestine Liberation Organization' in the United Nations system," and it delegate was assigned a seated in the UN General Assembly immediately after non-member states, and before all other observers. One hundred and four states voted for this resolution, forty-four abstained, and two – the United States and Israel – voted against. By mid-December, seventy-five states had recognized Palestine, rising to eighty-nine states by February 1989.

The declaration is generally interpreted to be a major step on the path to Israel's recognition by the Palestinians. Just as in Israel's declaration of independence, it partly bases its claims on UN GA 181. By reference to "resolutions of Arab Summits" and "UN resolutions since 1947" (like SC 242) it implicitly and perhaps ambiguously restricted its immediate claims to the Palestinian territories and Jerusalem. It was accompanied by a political statement that explicitly mentioned SC 242 and other UN resolutions and called only for withdrawal from "Arab Jerusalem" and the other "Arab territories occupied." Yasser Arafat's statements in Geneva a month later were accepted by the United States as sufficient to remove the ambiguities it saw in the declaration and to fulfill the longheld conditions for open dialogue with the United States.

=== Palestinian Authority (1994) ===
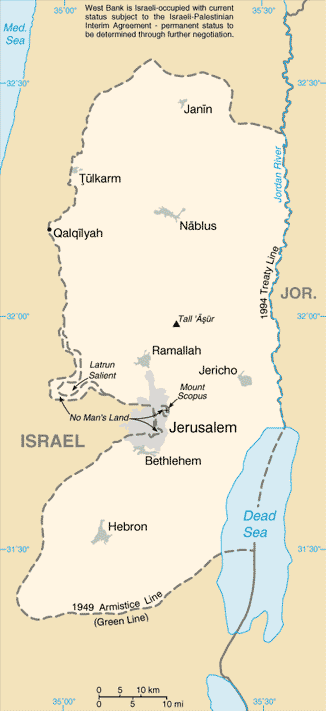
The West Bank

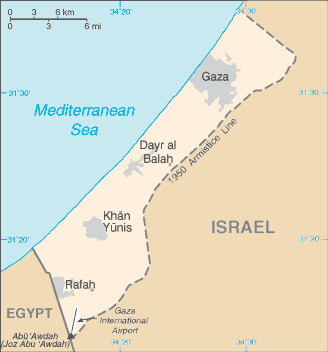
The Gaza Strip

Under the terms of the Oslo Accords signed between Israel and the PLO, the latter assumed control over the Jericho area of the West Bank and the Gaza Strip on 17 May 1994. On 28 September 1995, following the signing of the Israeli-Palestinian Interim Agreement on the West Bank and Gaza Strip, Israeli military forces withdrew from the West Bank towns of Nablus, Ramallah, Jericho, Jenin, Tulkarem, Qalqilya and Bethlehem. In December 1995, the PLO also assumed responsibility for civil administration in 17 areas in Hebron. While the PLO assumed these responsibilities as a result of Oslo, a new temporary interim administrative body was set up as a result of the Accords to carry out these functions on the ground: the Palestinian National Authority (PNA).

According to Omar Dajani, the relationship between the PLO and PNA (or PA) in light of the interim arrangements of Oslo Accords may be stating as "Palestine may best be described as a transitional association between the PA and the PLO." He goes on to explain that this transitional association accords the PA responsibility for local government and the PLO responsibility for representation of the Palestinian people in the international arena, while prohibiting it from concluding international agreements that affect the status of the West Bank and Gaza Strip. This situation is said to be accepted by the Palestinian population insofar as it is viewed as a temporary arrangement.

In 2005, following the implementation of Israel's unilateral disengagement plan, PNA gained full control of the Gaza Strip with the exception of its borders, airspace, and territorial waters.^{[iii]} This increased the percentage of land in the Gaza strip nominally governed by the PA from 60 percent to 100 percent.

The West Bank and Gaza Strip continued to be considered by the international community to be Occupied Palestinian Territory, notwithstanding the 1988 declaration of Palestinian independence, the limited self-government accorded to the Palestinian Authority as a result of the 1993 Oslo Accords, and Israel's withdrawal from Gaza as part of the Israel's unilateral disengagement plan of 2005, which saw the dismantlement of four Israeli settlements in the West Bank and all settlements in the Gaza Strip.

In March 2008, it was reported that the PA was working to increase the number of countries that recognize Palestine and that a PA representative had signed a bilateral agreement between the State of Palestine and Costa Rica. An Al-Haq position paper (2009) said the reality is that the PA has entered into various agreements with international organizations and states. These instances of foreign relations undertaken by the PA signify that the Interim Agreement is part of a larger on-going peace process, and that the restrictions on the foreign policy operations of the PA conflict with the inalienable right of the Palestinian people to self-determination, now a norm with a nature of jus cogens, which includes a right to engage in international relations with other peoples. Israeli government and many experts consider such actions as violation of the Oslo Accords.

When the PA is exercising the power that is granted to them by the Oslo Accords, they're acting in the capacity of an agency whose authority is based on an agreement between Israel and the PLO and not as a state.

==== Split of Fatah and Hamas ====
In 2007, after Hamas's legislative victories, the Fatah and Hamas engaged into a violent conflict, taking place mainly in the Gaza Strip, leading to effective collapse of the Palestinian national unity government. After the takeover in Gaza by Hamas on 14 June 2007, Palestinian Authority Chairman Abbas dismissed the Hamas-led government and appointed Salam Fayyad as Prime Minister. Though the new government's authority is claimed to extend to all Palestinian territories, in effect it became limited to the West Bank, as Hamas hasn't recognized the move and continued to rule the Gaza Strip. While PNA budget comes mainly from various aid programs and support of the Arab League, the Hamas Government in Gaza became dependent mainly on Iran until the eruption of the Arab Spring.

=== Palestine in the United Nations ===
==== 2011 United Nations membership application ====
After a two-year impasse in negotiations with Israel, the Palestinian Authority sought in September 2011 to gain recognition from the UN General Assembly as a state along Israel's pre-1967 borders, with East Jerusalem as its capital. A successful application for membership in the UN would require approval from the UN Security Council and a two-thirds majority in the UN General Assembly.

On the prospect of this being successful, U.S. Ambassador to the United Nations Susan Rice alluded to a potential U.S. government withdrawal of UN funding: "This would be exceedingly politically damaging in our domestic context, as you can well imagine. And I cannot frankly think of a greater threat to our ability to maintain financial and political support for the United Nations in Congress than such an outcome." On 28 June, the U.S. Senate passed S.Res. 185 calling on U.S. President Barack Obama to veto the motion and threatening a withdrawal of aid to the West Bank if the Palestinians followed through on their plans. At the likely prospect of a veto, Palestinian leaders signalled they might opt instead for a more limited upgrade to "non-member state" status, which requires only the approval of the UN General Assembly.

Mahmoud Abbas stated he would accept a return to negotiations and abandon the decision if the Israelis agree to the 1967 borders and the right of return for Palestinian refugees. Israel labelled the plan as a unilateral step, to which Foreign Minister Erekat replied,

"We are not going [to the UN] for a unilateral declaration of the Palestinian state. We declared our state in 1988 and we have embassies in more than 130 countries and more countries are recognising our state on the 1967 borders. The recognition of the Palestinian state is a sovereignty decision by the countries and it doesn't need to happen through the UN."

The Arab League formally backed the plan in May, and was officially confirmed by the PLO on 26 June.

On 11 July, the Quartet on the Middle East met to discuss a return to negotiations, but the meeting produced no result. On 13 July, in an interview with Haaretz, Palestinian Ambassador to the United Nations Riyad Mansour claimed that 122 states had so far extended formal recognition to the Palestinian state. On the following day, the Arab League released a draft statement which declared a consensus to "go to the United Nations to request the recognition of the State of Palestine with Al Quds as its capital and to move ahead and request a full membership." The league's secretary-general, Nabil al-Arabi, confirmed the statement and said that the application for membership will be submitted by the Arab League. On 18 July, Syria announced that it had formally recognised the State of Palestine, the last Arab state to do so. The decision was welcomed by the league, but met with criticism from some, including former Lebanese prime minister Selim al-Hoss: "Syria has always been calling for the liberation of Palestine from Israeli occupation and ambitions. The latest stance, however, shows that [Syria] has given up on a national policy that has spanned several decades. ... Why this abandonment of a national principle, and what is the motive behind it? There is no motive except to satisfy international powers that seek to appease Israel".

On 23 September, Abbas delivered to the UN Secretary-General the official application for recognition of a Palestinian state by the UN and a membership in the same organization. On 11 November a report was approved by the Security Council which concluded that the council had been unable "to make a unanimous recommendation" on membership for Palestine.

==== 2011 UNESCO membership ====
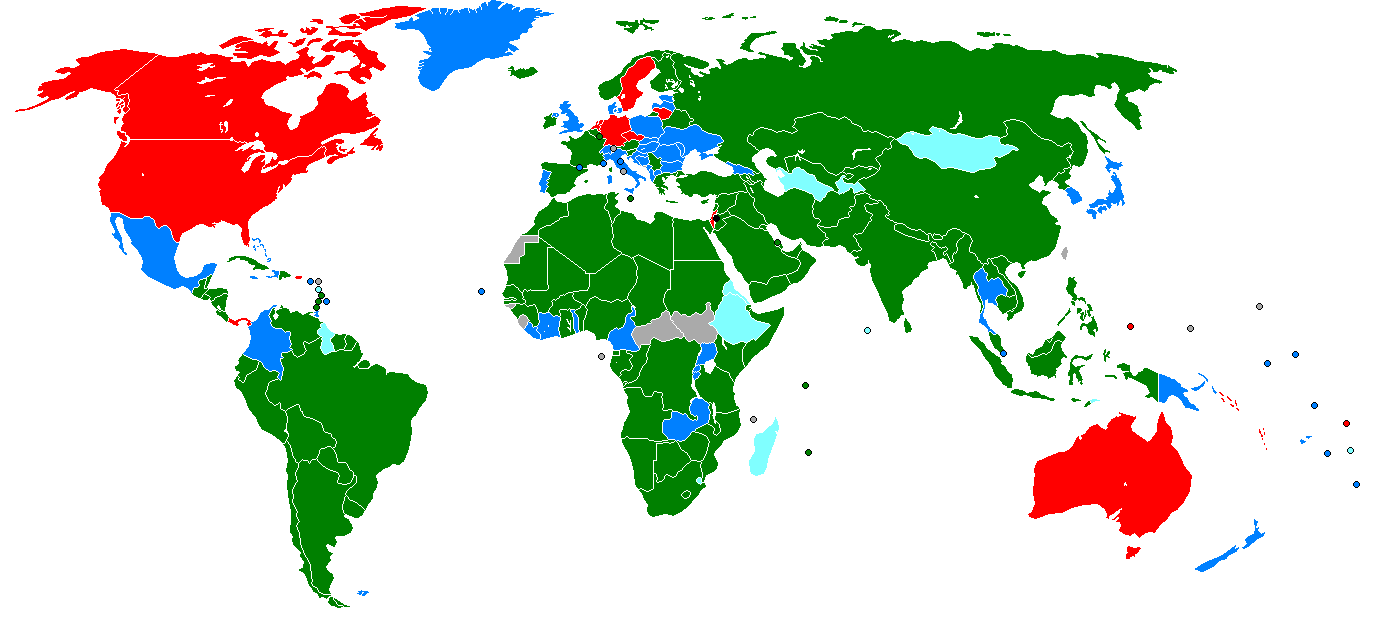
UNESCO membership voting results: In favour Against Abstentions Absent non-members / ineligible to vote

The PLO was accorded observer status at UNESCO in 1974. In 1989, an application for the admission of Palestine as a member state was submitted by a group of seven states during the 131st session of UNESCO's executive board. The board postponed a decision until the next session, and the item was included on each session's agenda thereafter, being repeatedly deferred. During the board's 187th session in September 2011, a draft resolution was presented by 24 states requesting that the application be considered and Palestine be granted membership in the organisation. Following consultations between the representatives of the 58-member board, the draft resolution was put for voting on 5 October. The board voted in favour of recommending the application, winning the approval of 40 states. The resolution to admit Palestine as the agency's 195th member state was adopted at the 36th General Conference on 31 October. Of the 185 dues-paying members eligible for voting, 107 were in favour, 14 were against, 52 abstained and 12 were absent. The resolution was submitted by a total of 43 states. Its membership was ratified on 23 November.

==== Non-member Observer State status in the UN (2012) ====
UN observer state status voting results: In favour Against Abstentions Absent Non-members

By September 2012, with their application for full membership stalled, Palestinian representatives had decided to pursue an upgrade in status from "observer entity" to "non-member observer state". On November 27 it was announced that the appeal had been officially made, and would be put to a vote in the General Assembly on November 29, where their status upgrade was expected to be supported by a majority of states. In addition to granting Palestine "non-member observer state status", the draft resolution "expresses the hope that the Security Council will consider favorably the application submitted on 23 September 2011 by the State of Palestine for admission to full membership in the United Nations, endorses the two state solution based on the pre-1967 borders, and stresses the need for an immediate resumption of negotiations between the two parties."

On Thursday, November 29, 2012, in a 138–9 vote (with 41 abstentions and 5 absences), General Assembly resolution 67/19 was adopted, upgrading Palestine to "non-member observer state" status in the United Nations. The new status equates Palestine's with that of the Holy See. Switzerland was also a non-member observer state until 2002. The change in status was described by The Independent as "de facto recognition of the sovereign state of Palestine".

The vote was a historic benchmark for the recognition of the State of Palestine, whilst it was widely considered a diplomatic setback for Israel and the United States. Status as an observer state in the UN allows the State of Palestine to participate in general debate at the General Assembly, to co-sponsor resolutions, to join treaties and specialized UN agencies. Even as a nonmember state, the Palestinians could join influential international bodies such as the World Trade Organization, the World Health Organization, the World Intellectual Property Organization, the World Bank and the International Criminal Court, where Palestinian Authority tried to have alleged Israeli war crimes in Gaza (2008-2009) investigated. However, in April 2012 prosecutors refused to open the investigation, saying it was not clear if the Palestinians were qualified as a state - as only states can recognize the court's jurisdiction. But the prosecutor confirmed explicitly in 2014 that the upgrade of November 2012 qualified the state of Palestine to join the Rome statute. On 31 December 2014 Palestinian President Abbas signed a declaration in which Palestine recognized the jurisdiction of the International Criminal Court for any crimes committed in the Palestinian territory since 13 June 2014.

The UN now can also help to affirm the borders of the Palestinian territories that Israel occupied in 1967. Theoretically Palestine could even claim legal rights over its territorial waters and air space as a sovereign state recognised by the UN.

The UN has, after the resolution was passed, permitted Palestine to title its representative office to the UN as 'The Permanent Observer Mission of the State of Palestine to the United Nations', seen by many as a reflexion of the UN's de facto recognition of the State of Palestine's sovereignty, and Palestine has started to re-title its name accordingly on postal stamps, official documents and passports. The Palestinian authorities have also instructed its diplomats to officially represent 'The State of Palestine', as opposed to the 'Palestine National Authority'. On 17 December 2012, UN Chief of Protocol Yeocheol Yoon decided that 'the designation of "State of Palestine" shall be used by the Secretariat in all official United Nations documents'. In January 2013, by an official decree of the Palestinian Authority President Mahmud Abbas, the Palestinian Authority has officially transformed all of its designations into the State of Palestine.

=== 2013 State of Palestine decree ===
Following the successful passage of the 2012 United Nations status resolution which changed Palestine's status at the UN to that of observer state, on 3 January 2013, Abbas signed a presidential decree 1/2013 officially changing the name of the 'Palestinian Authority' to the 'State of Palestine'. The decree stated that "Official documents, seals, signs and letterheads of the Palestinian National Authority official and national institutions shall be amended by replacing the name ‘Palestinian National Authority’ whenever it appears by the name ‘State of Palestine’ and by adopting the emblem of the State of Palestine." According to international lawyer John V. Whitbeck the decree results in absorbing of the Palestinian Authority into the State of Palestine. On 8 January 2013 the Minister of Communication Safa Nassereddin, said that because issuing new stamps requires Israeli approval to print them and bring them into the country, it was decided that the new stamps will be printed in Bahrain and the first of these stamps will be used by Palestinian embassies and other diplomatic missions abroad.

On 5 January 2013 Abbas ordered all Palestinian embassies to change any official reference to the Palestinian Authority into State of Palestine. Missions in countries that voted "against" UNGA resolution 67/19 of 2012 are ordered to consult the foreign ministry. Three days later, Omar Awadallah, a foreign ministry official, said that those missions should also use the new name. Some of the countries themselves, such as Norway, Sweden and Spain, stick to the Palestinian Authority term even though they voted "in favor" of the UNGA resolution.

On 6 January 2013, Abbas ordered his cabinet of ministers to prepare regulations to issue new Palestinian passports, official signs and postage stamps in the name of the 'State of Palestine'. Two days later, following a negative reaction by Israel, it was announced that the change will not apply to documents used at Israel checkpoints in the West Bank and Israeli crossings, unless there is a further decision by Abbas. Saeb Erekat then said the new emblem will be used in correspondence with countries that have recognized a state of Palestine.

For the time being the governments of the renamed Authority established in 1994 and of the State established in 1988 remain distinct. On 5 January 2013 it was announced that it is expected the PLO Central Council would take over the functions of the Palestinian Authority's government and parliament. On the following day, Saeb Erekat, head of the PLO negotiations department, said that the authority should draft a new constitution.

Following the change in name, Turkey became the first state to recognize this change, and on 15 April 2013, the Turkish Consul-General in East Jerusalem Şakir Torunlar presented his credentials as first Turkish Ambassador to the State of Palestine to Palestinian President in Ramallah.

== Peace process ==
=== Oslo accords ===
In the 1990s, outstanding steps were taken which formally began a process the goal of which was to solve the Arab–Israeli conflict through a two-state solution. Beginning with the Madrid Conference of 1991 and culminating in the 1993 Oslo Peace Accords between Palestinians and Israelis, the peace process has laid the framework for Palestinian autonomy in the West Bank and in Gaza. According to the Oslo Accords, signed by Yassir Arafat and then Israeli Prime Minister Yitzhak Rabin in Washington, Israel would pull out of the Gaza Strip and cities in the West Bank. East Jerusalem, which had been annexed by Israel in 1980 was not mentioned in any of the agreements.

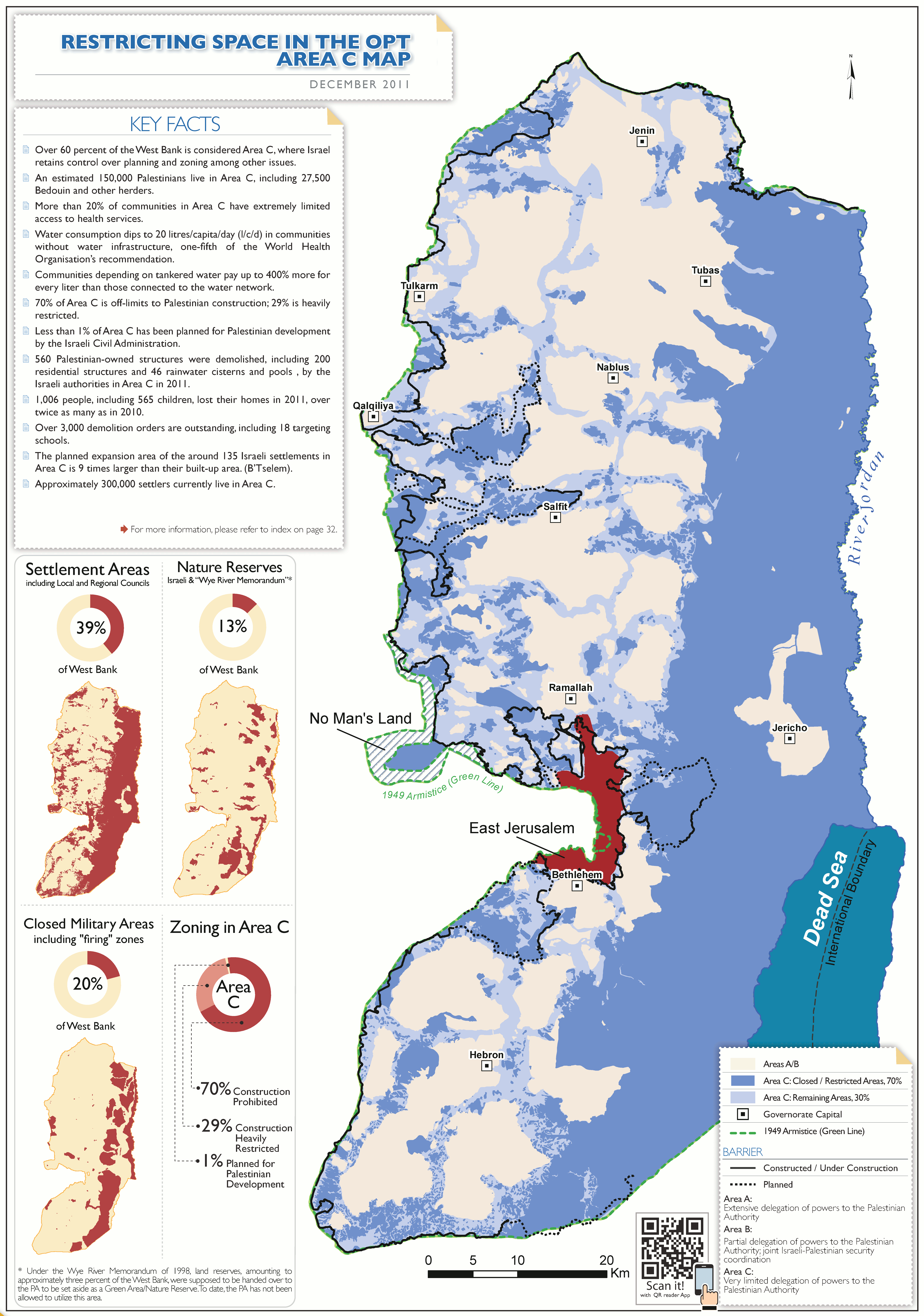
Area C, controlled by Israel under Oslo Accords, in blue and red, in December 2011

Following the landmark accords, the Palestinian National Authority (PNA) was established to govern those areas from which Israel was to pull out. The PNA was granted limited autonomy over a non-contiguous area, though it does govern most Palestinian population centers.

The process stalled with the collapse of the Camp David 2000 Summit between Palestinians and Israel, after which the second Intifada broke out.

Israel ceased acting in cooperation with the PNA. In the shadow of the rising death toll from the violence, the United States initiated the Road Map for Peace (published on June 24, 2002), which was intended to end the Intifada by disarming the Palestinian terror groups and creating an independent Palestinian state. The Road Map has stalled awaiting the implementation of the step required by the first phase of that plan with then Israeli Prime Minister Ariel Sharon stating within weeks of the release of the final text that a settlement freeze, one of Israel's main requirements, would be "impossible" because of the need for settlers to build new houses and start families. It remains stalled because of Israel's continuing refusal to comply with the requirement to freeze settlement expansion and the civil war between Hamas and Fatah, except that on April 27, 2011, it was announced that Hamas and Fatah had reached a reconciliation agreement in a pact which was brokered by Egypt. Hamas, Fatah, and the other Palestinian political factions signed the reconciliation agreement in the official signing ceremony of that agreement which took place on May 4, 2011.

In 2005, Israel unilaterally withdrew from the Gaza Strip as part of the Disengagement Plan.

In 2008, U.S.-brokered negotiations were ongoing between Palestinian Chairman Mahmoud Abbas and the outgoing Israeli Prime Minister, Ehud Olmert.

In 2011, Al Jazeera published thousands of classified documents that it had received from sources close to negotiators in the 2008 negotiation talks between Israeli Prime Minister Olmert and Palestinian Chairman Mahmoud Abbas. The documents, dubbed the Palestine Papers, showed that in private the Palestinians had made major concessions on issues that had scuttled previous negotiations. Olmert also presented his ideas for the borders for a Palestinian state, dubbed the "Napkin Map" because of Abbas having to sketch the map on a napkin because Olmert refused to allow Abbas to keep a copy for further consideration. Olmert's proposal largely followed the route of the Israeli West Bank barrier, and placed all of the Israeli settlement blocs and East Jerusalem Jewish neighbourhoods under Israeli sovereignty. Israel would retain around 10% of the West Bank and in return the Palestinians would receive around 5% of Israeli territory adjacent to the southern West Bank and lands adjacent to the Gaza Strip.

=== Direct talks in 2010 ===
In early September 2010 the first peace talks since the Gaza war in 2009 were held in Washington DC between Israeli prime-minister Benjamin Netanyahu and Palestinian leader Mahmoud Abbas. The pace of the talks were assessed by the US as "break through". However, on 25 September Netanyahu did not renew a 10-month moratorium on settlement construction in the West Bank, which brought him severe criticism from the United States, Europe and the United Nations. Abbas stated that Netanyahu could not be trusted as a 'true' peace negotiator if the freeze was not extended. Netanyahu's failure to uphold the commitments he made just a few weeks earlier "to reaching a comprehensive peace agreement with Palestinians" through extending the term of moratorium has caused a de facto halt of peace negotiations.

On 28 September 2010, Israeli foreign minister Avigdor Lieberman, leader of the ultra-nationalist Yisrael Beiteinu party, presented to the UN a ″peace plan″ according to which ″parts of Israel's territory populated predominantly by Israeli Arabs would be transferred to a newly created Palestinian state, in return for annexation of Israeli settlements in the West Bank and/or population swap″. The statement came about while Israeli prime-minister Netanyahu and Palestinian leader Abbas were holding peace talks mediated by the United States. In the press conference on 28 September Netanyahu stated "Israel, Palestinians can reach Middle-East peace in a year". However, Liberman's controversial proposal means that "the conflict will not be solved within a year and that implementation of the peace agreement will take generations". Lieberman's proposal was viewed as undermining Netanyahu's credibility in the discussions and causing embarrassment for the Israeli government. According to a New York Jewish leader "Every time when Lieberman voices skepticism for peace talks, he gives Abu Mazen [Abbas] and the Arab League an opportunity to reinforce their claim that Netanyahu isn't serious." On 29 September, while commenting on the Lieberman proposal Netanyahu said that "I didn't see [the] speech beforehand, but I don't reject the idea."

The proposal also caused wide 'outrage' among Israelis and US Jews. Seymour Reich, a former president of the Conference of Presidents of Major Jewish Organizations stated that "If Lieberman can't keep his personal opinions to himself, he ought to resign from the cabinet."

=== Positions ===
International recognition of the State of Palestine

The 2013 position of the Palestinian Authority was that all of the West Bank and Gaza Strip should form the basis of a future "State of Palestine". For additional discussion, see Palestinian territories. Israeli governments have maintained that the area involved is subject to future negotiations, and within territorial dispute. However, the position of the Islamic Hamas faction of the PA, as stated in its founding Covenant, is that Palestine (meaning all of Israel, the West Bank and the Gaza Strip) is rightfully an Islamic state.

The main discussion since 1993 has focused on turning most or all of the Gaza Strip and the West Bank into an independent Palestinian state. This was the basis for the Oslo accords, and it is, as a matter of official policy, favoured by the U.S. The status of Israel within the 1949 Armistice lines has not been the subject of international negotiations. Some members of the PLO recognize Israel's right to exist within these boundaries; others hold that Israel must eventually be destroyed. Consequently, some Israelis hold that Palestinian statehood is impossible with the current PLO as a basis, and needs to be delayed.

Israel declares that its security demands that a "Palestinian entity" would not have all attributes of a state, at least initially, so that in case things go wrong, Israel would not have to face a dangerous and nearby enemy. Israel may be therefore said to agree (as of now) not to a complete and independent Palestinian state, but rather to a self-administering entity, with partial but not full sovereignty over its borders and its citizens.

The central Palestinian position is that they have already compromised greatly by accepting a state covering only the areas of the West Bank and Gaza. These areas are significantly less territory than allocated to the Arab state in UN Resolution 181. They feel that it is unacceptable for an agreement to impose additional restrictions (such as level of militarization, see below) which, they declare, makes a viable state impossible. In particular, they are angered by significant increases in the population of Israeli settlements and communities in the West Bank and Gaza Strip during the interim period of the Oslo accords. Palestinians claim that they have already waited long enough, and that Israel's interests do not justify depriving their state of those rights that they consider important. The Palestinians have been unwilling to accept a territorially disjointed state.

== Parties which recognise a Palestinian entity separate from Israel ==
- There are conflicting reports about the number of countries that extended their recognition to the proclaimed State of Palestine. In Annex 2 of the Request for the Admission of the State of Palestine to UNESCO from 12 May 1982, several Arab and African countries provided a list of 92 countries allegedly having extended such recognition. In the same document (Corrigendum 1), it is requested that Austria be removed from the list. Namibia is listed even though it was not independent at the time. The list also includes a considerable number of states that ceased to exist during the 1990s, most notably the German Democratic Republic, Yugoslavia, Czechoslovakia, Democratic Yemen, People's Republic of Kampuchea (today: Cambodia) and Zaire (today: Democratic Republic of the Congo). On 13 February 2008, The Palestinian Authorities' Minister of Foreign Affairs announced he could provide documents for the recognition of 67 countries in the proclaimed State of Palestine. The existing countries that are known to have extended such recognition include most Arab League nations, most African nations, and several Asian nations, including China and India.
- Many countries, including European countries, the United States and Israel recognize the Palestinian Authority established in 1994, as per the Oslo Accords, as an autonomous geopolitical entity without extending recognition to the 1988 proclaimed State of Palestine.
- Since the 1996 Summer Olympics, the International Olympic Committee have recognized a separate Palestine Olympic Committee and Palestinian team. Two track & field athletes, Majdi Abu Marahil and Ihab Salama, competed for the inaugural Palestinian team.
- Since 1998, football's world governing body FIFA have recognized the Palestine national football team as a separate entity. On 26 October 2008 Palestine played their first match at home, a 1–1 draw against Jordan in the West Bank.
- In December 2010-January 2011 Brazil, Argentina, Chile, Uruguay, Bolivia and Paraguay recognized a Palestinian state.
- On January 18, 2011, Russia reiterated (first time 1988) its support and recognition of the state of Palestine.
- In January 2011, Ireland upgraded the Palestinian delegation in Dublin to the status of a mission.
- In July 2011, the Sheikh Jarrah Solidarity Movement organized a protest march in East Jerusalem, with approximately 3,000 people participating, carrying Palestinian flags and repeating slogans in favor of a unilateral declaration of independence by the Palestinian Authority.

== See also ==
- Isratin
- Camp David Accords
- Oslo Accords
- Arab–Israeli conflict
- British Mandate for Palestine
- 2000 Camp David Summit
- King Hussein's federation plan
- Declaration of the Establishment of the State of Israel, May 14, 1948
- Foreign relations of the Palestine Liberation Organization
- Geneva Accord
- Arab Peace Initiative
- Israeli–Palestinian conflict
- Palestine Investment Conference
- Proposals for a Jewish state
- Right to Exist
- Occupation of the Gaza Strip by Egypt
- Jordanian annexation of the West Bank
- One-state solution
- Two-state solution
- Palestinian National Authority
