= All-Palestine Protectorate =

1948–1959 Egyptian client state in Gaza

All-Palestine Protectorate محمية عموم فلسطين (Arabic) Maḥmiyyat ʿUmūm Falasṭīn
- 1948–1959
- Flag of the Arab Revolt (1948‍–‍1959); Red Script Flag of Palestine (1948‍–‍1955)

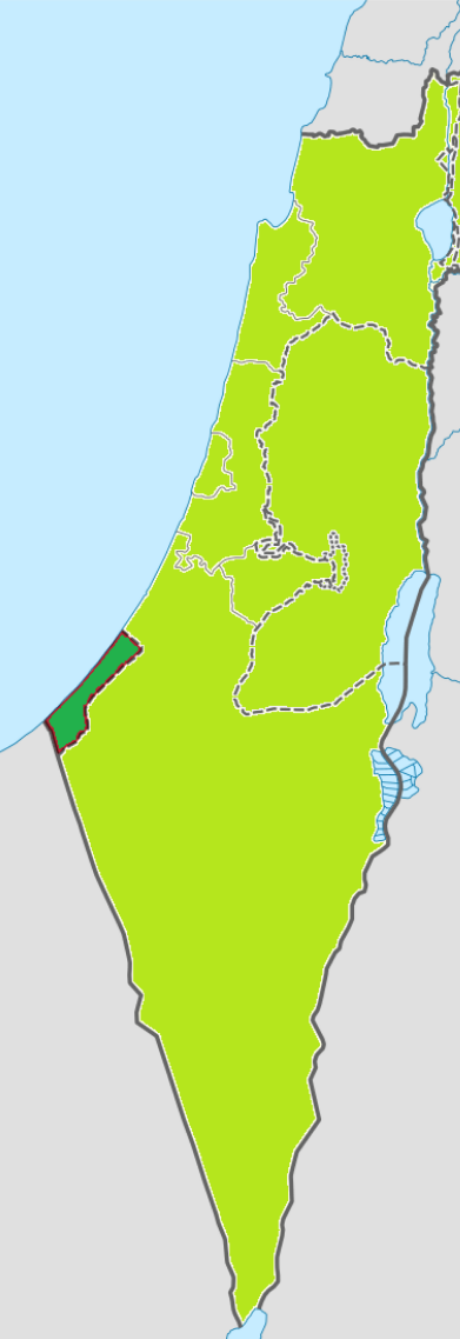
- Land controlled by the All-Palestine Government shown in dark green; land claimed but not controlled shown in light green.
- Status: Partially recognized protectorate of the Kingdom of Egypt and later the Republic of Egypt Occupied by Israel (1956–57)
- Capital: Jerusalem (de jure); Gaza City (de facto)
- Administrative center: Gaza City (1948); Cairo (1949–59)
- Official languages: Arabic
- Local vernacular: Palestinian Arabic
- Religion: Islam (majority); Sunni Islam; Shia Islam; Christianity (minority); Greek Orthodoxy; Oriental Orthodoxy
- Demonym: Palestinian Arab
- Government: Unitary semi-presidential republic
- President
  - 1948–1953: Amin al-Husseini
- Prime Minister
  - 1948–1959: Ahmed Hilmi Pasha
- Legislature: All-Palestine National Council
- Historical era: Cold War
  - Established: 22 September 1948
  - 1949 Armistice: 1949
  - Arab League places Gaza Strip under official aegis of Egypt: 1952
  - Government dissolved (except Prime Minister's post): 1953
  - Suez Crisis: 1956
  - Disestablished: 1959

Area
  - Area of Gaza Strip: 365 km^{2} (141 sq mi)

Population
  - Estimate: 5,483,450
- Currency: Egyptian pound
Preceded by	Succeeded by
Mandatory Palestine	United Arab Republic occupation of the Gaza Strip
- Today part of: Gaza Strip

The All-Palestine Protectorate (Arabic: محمية عموم فلسطين; 22 September 1948–1959), also known as All-Palestine or the Gaza Protectorate, was a short-lived client state with limited recognition, corresponding to the area of the modern Gaza Strip, established in the areas of former Mandatory Palestine captured by the Kingdom of Egypt during the 1948 Arab–Israeli War. The Protectorate was declared on 22 September 1948 in Gaza City, and the All-Palestine Government was formed. The President of the Gaza-seated administration was Hajj Amin al-Husseini, the former chairman of the Arab Higher Committee, while the Prime Minister was Ahmed Hilmi Pasha. In December 1948, just three months after the declaration, the All-Palestine Government was relocated to Cairo and was never allowed to return to Gaza, making it a government in exile. With a further resolution of the Arab League to put the Gaza Strip under the official protection of Egypt in 1952, the All-Palestine Government was gradually stripped of its authority. In 1953, the government was nominally dissolved, though the Palestinian Prime Minister, Hilmi Pasha, continued to attend Arab League meetings on its behalf. In 1959, the protectorate was de jure merged into the United Arab Republic, while de facto turning Gaza into a military occupation area of Egypt.

While a de facto Egyptian puppet state since its inception, there are differences of opinion as to whether the All-Palestine Protectorate represented an abortive but genuine attempt at an independent Palestinian Arab state, or if it was simply a façade for an Egyptian occupation of part or all of former Mandatory Palestine right from the get-go. Though the All-Palestine Government claimed jurisdiction over the entire territories of the former British Mandatory Palestine, at no time did its effective jurisdiction extend beyond the Gaza Strip, with the West Bank annexed by Transjordan and Israel holding the rest. The All-Palestine Protectorate relied entirely on the Egyptian government for funding and on UNRWA to relieve the plight of the Palestinian refugees in the Gaza Strip. During most of its existence, the All-Palestine Protectorate was under de facto Egyptian administration, though Egypt never made any claim to or annexed any Palestinian territory. Egypt did not offer the Gazan Palestinians citizenship. Palestinians living in the Gaza Strip and Egypt were issued All-Palestine passports, and those living in the Gaza Strip were not permitted to move freely into Egypt. However, these passports were only recognized by six Arab countries.

== Name ==
According to Israeli academic Zvi Elpeleg, the term All-Palestine was coined to forestall any possible criticism by King Abdullah I of Jordan that the establishment of a Palestinian government meant acceptance of the partition plan.

== History ==
=== Prelude ===
Egypt supervised the government of Palestine in Gaza as a trustee on behalf of the Arab League. An Egyptian Ministerial order dated 1 June 1948 declared that all laws in force during the Mandate would continue to be in force in the Gaza Strip. Another order issued on 8 August 1948 vested an Egyptian Administrator-General with the powers of the High Commissioner.

=== Formation ===
The protectorate was established in the Gaza enclave area captured by the Kingdom of Egypt during the 1948 Arab–Israeli War. All-Palestine was declared on 22 September 1948 in Gaza City, and the All-Palestine Government was formed. The Prime Minister of the Gaza-seated administration was Ahmed Hilmi Pasha and the President was Hajj Amin al-Husseini, former chairman of the Arab Higher Committee. In December 1948, just three months after the declaration, the All-Palestine Government was relocated to Cairo and was never allowed to return to Gaza, making it a government in exile.

The Arab–Israeli War came to an end with the Israel-Egypt Armistice Agreement of 24 February 1949, which fixed the boundaries of the Gaza Strip. The All-Palestine Government was not a party to the Agreement nor involved in its negotiation.

=== 1948–1952 ===
The All-Palestine Government was entirely relocated to Cairo in late October 1948 and became a government-in-exile, gradually losing any importance. Having a part in the All-Palestine Government, President al-Husseini also remained in exile at Heliopolis in Egypt throughout much of the 1950s.

=== Decline and dissolution ===
With further resolution of the Arab League to put the Gaza Strip under the official protectorate of Egypt in 1952, the All-Palestine Government was gradually stripped of authority. In 1953, the government was nominally dissolved, though the Palestinian Prime Minister Hilmi continued to attend Arab League meetings on its behalf. In 1959, the protectorate was de jure merged into the United Arab Republic, while de facto turning Gaza into military occupation area of Egypt.

== Geography ==
The Gaza Strip was the only area of the former British Mandate territory that was under the nominal control of the All-Palestine Government. The rest of the British Mandate territory became either part of Israel or the West Bank, annexed by Transjordan (a move that was not recognized internationally, except by the United Kingdom).

== Government and politics ==
=== Government ===
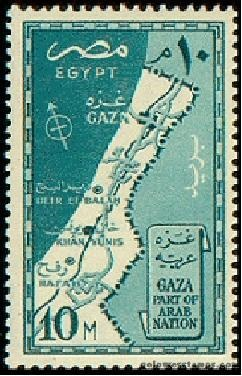
Egyptian stamp of Gaza Strip in 1957 with the caption-"Gaza Part of the Arab Nation"

The All-Palestine Government was established by the Arab League on 22 September 1948 during the 1948 Arab–Israeli War to govern the All-Palestine protectorate. It was soon recognized by all Arab League members except Transjordan. Though jurisdiction of the Government was declared to cover the whole of the former Mandatory Palestine, its effective jurisdiction was limited to the All-Palestine Protectorate (Gaza Strip). The Prime Minister of the Gaza-seated administration was Ahmed Hilmi Pasha, and the President was Hajj Amin al-Husseini, former chairman of the Arab Higher Committee.

The new government had no administration, no civil service, no money, and no real army of its own. It formally adopted the Flag of the Arab Revolt that had been used by Arab nationalists since 1917 and revived the Holy War Army with the declared aim of liberating Palestine. The government was dissolved by Egypt in 1953, retaining only the Prime Minister office.

=== National Council ===
The All-Palestine National Council, officially Palestinian National Council (PNC). was convened in Gaza on 1 October 1948, under the chairmanship of Amin al-Husayni. The Council passed a series of resolutions culminating on 1 October 1948 with a Palestinian Declaration of Independence over the whole of Palestine, with Jerusalem as its capital. The council served the legislative arm of the All-Palestine Protectorate.

=== Foreign relations ===
==== Recognition ====
Egypt, which manipulated its formation, recognized All-Palestine on 12 October, followed by Syria and Lebanon on 13 October, Saudi Arabia the 14th and Yemen on the 16th. Iraq's decision to the same was made formally on the 12th, but was not made public. Both the United Kingdom and the United States backed Jordan's stance, with the US saying that Amin al-Husseini's close ties to the Axis powers in World War II could be neither forgotten nor pardoned.

Shortly thereafter, the Jericho Conference named King Abdullah I of Transjordan, "King of Arab Palestine". The Congress called for the union of Arab Palestine and Transjordan and Abdullah announced his intention to annex the West Bank. The other Arab League member states opposed Abdullah's plan.

==== Passports ====
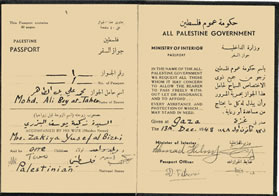
1948 – Palestinian Passport number 1 – All Palestine Government

During most of its existence, the All-Palestine Protectorate was under de facto Egyptian administration, though Egypt never made any claim to or annexed any Palestinian territory. Egypt did not offer the Gazan Palestinians citizenship. Palestinians living in the Gaza Strip and Egypt were issued All-Palestine passports, and were not permitted to move freely into Egypt. However, these passports were only recognized by six Arab countries. The passports ceased to be issued when the All-Palestine Government was dissolved, though some countries continued to recognize them for some time.

=== Military ===
The All-Palestine Government revived the Holy War Army with the declared aim of "liberating Palestine". The Army, however, never actually recovered from the defeat of the 1947–1949 Palestine War and was in fact a collection of Palestinian fedayeen militias. The militias often engaged in armed attacks on Israeli border areas in what became known as the Palestinian Fedayeen insurgency.

=== Legal status ===
Ernest A. Gross, a senior U.S. State Department legal adviser, authored a memorandum for the United States government titled Recognition of New States and Governments in Palestine, dated 11 May 1948. He expressed the view that "The Arab and Jewish communities will be legally entitled on May 15, 1948 (the date of expiry of the British Mandate) to proclaim states and organize governments in the areas of Palestine occupied by the respective communities." Gross also said "the law of nations recognizes an inherent right of people lacking the agencies and institutions of social and political control to organize a state and operate a government."

Though this is a generally accepted principle of international law, Gross' opinion was only internal US government advice. In any event, the British Mandate did expire on 15 May 1948. Other than the Arab Higher Committee, which was re-established in 1945 by the Arab League, the Palestinian Arab community had no government, and no administrative or unified military structure. It relied on the objective declared by the Arab League on 12 April 1948, and the expectation that the Arab armies would prevail over the Palestinian Jewish community. As the war progressed, however, the ineffectiveness of the Committee became obvious.

When it appeared that the Arab forces would not defeat the Israeli forces (and with King Abdullah I of Transjordan taking steps to annex the West Bank), fresh political measures were taken in the form of resurrecting the All-Palestine Government. By the end of the war, however, the Arab Higher Committee had become politically irrelevant.

There are differences of opinion as to whether the All-Palestine Protectorate was a mere puppet or façade of the Egyptian occupation, with negligible independent funding or influence, or whether it was a genuine attempt to establish an independent Palestinian state. Though the All-Palestine Government claimed jurisdiction over the whole former British Mandate of Palestine at no time did its effective jurisdiction extend beyond the Gaza Strip, with the West Bank annexed by Jordan and Israel holding the rest. The All-Palestine Protectorate relied entirely on the Egyptian government for funding and on UNRWA to relieve the plight of the Palestinian refugees in the Gaza Strip. The All-Palestine Government relocated to Cairo in late 1948, where it became a government-in-exile and gradually fell apart because of its impotence, four years later becoming a department of the Arab League. The protectorate was finally dissolved in 1959 by decree of Egyptian President Gamal Abdel Nasser.

== Dissolution and aftermath ==
In 1959, the protectorate was de jure merged into the United Arab Republic, while de facto turning Gaza into a military occupation area of Egypt.

In 1957, the Basic Law of Gaza established a Legislative Council that could pass laws which were given to the High Administrator-General for approval. In 1962, elections were held in the Egyptian-occupied Gaza and 22 Palestinian members were elected into the council.

== See also ==
- Jordanian annexation of the West Bank
- State of Palestine

== Sources ==
- Laurens, Henry (2007). Une mission sacrée de civilisation. La Question de Palestine (in French). Vol. 3. Paris: Fayard. ISBN 978-2-213-63358-9.
