= Bourguiba initiative =

1973 proposal to end the Arab–Israeli conflict

Bourguiba initiative was an initiative to end the Arab–Israeli conflict announced on 2 July 1973 by Tunisian President Habib Bourguiba. It stipulates that Israel accepts the principle of the partition of Palestine, in accordance with UN General Assembly Resolution 181 of 1947. The demarcation of the border between the Arab states and Israel, through negotiations. And the establishment of a Palestinian state. In response to the initiative, the Jordanian government announced its absolute rejection of Bourguiba's remarks and the severing of diplomatic relations with Tunisia.

== Initiative ==
Bourguiba said in a speech about the initiative: "There are two peoples, fighting over one land. And I say, why can't we imagine Palestine being divided between Palestinians and Israelis? Of course, every people will sacrifice something. For their part, the Israelis abandon the territories they occupied by force of arms and retain what the United Nations granted them in 1947 under Partition Resolution 181."

Three days after the launch of the initiative, the Beiruti newspaper An-Nahar published an interview with Bourguiba explaining his new initiative and ideas on resolving the conflict with Israel. He spoke about the roots of the conflict and how to address its issues, especially the issue of an independent Palestinian state and the issue of the return of refugees. Bourguiba proposed that this state be on the territory granted by the partition resolution to the Arabs, in addition to the east bank of the Jordan River, the area under Hashemites rule. "There is nothing in history called Transjordan., Britain has divided the desert part of Palestine, along with its tribes, and named it east of Jordan."

== Reactions ==
- The Jordanian National Union, the pro-monarchy political organization founded in 1971 in the wake of the Black September issued an official statement on 7 July 1973. It described Bourguiba's initiative and remarks as "diluting and wasting the Palestinian right to their land and the homeland, from participating and uniting the effort to liberate the usurped homeland, to searching for an alternative area, where the victims of this aggression will settle."
