= Occupation of Gaza =

Occupation of Gaza may refer to:

- Egyptian occupation of the Gaza Strip, 1948/1959–1967
- Israeli occupation of the Gaza Strip, 1967–present
