= All-Palestine National Council =

Palestinian legislative body in the Egyptian protectorate of Gaza

The All-Palestine National Council, officially Palestinian National Council (PNC), was the legislative body of the All-Palestine Protectorate convened in Gaza on 1 October 1948, under the chairmanship of Amin al-Husayni. The Council passed a series of resolutions culminating on 3 October with a declaration of independence and claimed jurisdiction over the whole of the former Mandatory Palestine, with Jerusalem as its capital. The formation of the All-Palestine Protectorate had been declared by Egypt on 22 September.

== History ==
The All-Palestine National Council convened on 1 October 1948, at the al-Fallah al-Islamiyah School, a building that belonged to the Muslim Waqf. The PNC participants were 75-80 municipal and village leaders out of 150 invitees. The others could not attend because of the Jordanian and Iraqi armies refused to permit delegates who resided in areas under their control.

Hajj Amin was elected President of the PNC. He was also elected President of the Higher Council - a sort of presidential institution to stand above both the All-Palestine Government and PNC - the executive arm and the legislative arm, respectively. The PNC continued in session through 2-3 October, and came to an end after passing a number of resolutions, including the adoption of the Sharifian flag of 1916, declaration of Jerusalem as the capital, general mobilization. In addition, a bill establishing the government and the declaration of independence were adopted and signed by all the delegates.

== Aftermath ==
In 1962, during the Egyptian military occupation of the Gaza Strip, the Palestinian Legislative Council was established, which replaced the PNC, disbanded several years earlier. The Palestinian Legislative Council was disbanded by the Israeli authorities in 1967.

== See also ==
- Palestinian National Council
- Palestinian Legislative Council
