= Ahmed Hilmi Pasha =

Palestinian soldier, economist, and politician

Ahmed Hilmi Pasha Al-Baqi
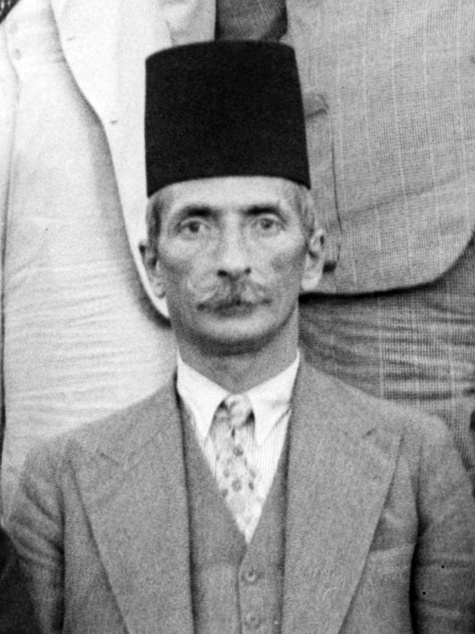

Prime Minister of the All-Palestine Government
- In office 22 September 1948 – 1959
- President: Amin al-Husayni
- Preceded by: Position established
- Succeeded by: Mahmoud Abbas (2003)

Minister of Finance of Transjordan
- In office 10 March 1923 – 6 May 1924
- Prime Minister: Ali Rikabi; Mazhar Raslan; Hasan Abu Al-Huda
- Preceded by: Madhar Raslan
- Succeeded by: Hasan Abu Al-Huda

Personal details
- Born: 1883 Sidon, Tripoli Sanjak, Beirut Vilayet, Ottoman Empire (now Lebanon)
- Died: 1963 (aged 79–80) Souk El Gharb, Aley District, Mount Lebanon Governorate, Lebanon
- Resting place: Jerusalem
- Party: Istiqlal

Ahmed Hilmi Abd al-Baqi Pasha (Arabic: أحمد حلمي عبد الباقي 1882 – 1963) was an Arab soldier, economist, and politician of Albanian descent, who served in various positions in post-Ottoman Levant, and later as Prime Minister of the short-lived All-Palestine Government in the Gaza Strip.

== Early life ==
Ahmed Hilmi was born 1882 in Sidon, Ottoman Empire (now Lebanon) and was of Albanian origin. During his lifetime he was referred to as al-Arnauti (the Albanian) by contemporaries such as Nabih al-Azma, Izzat Darwaza and ‘Ajaj Nuwayhid. Ahmed Hilmi's father was Abdulbaki, an Ottoman army officer born in Tulkarm and stationed in Sidon at the time of Ahmed's birth. Ahmed Hilmi completed his education in Nablus and Tulkarm. Before the collapse of the Ottoman Empire, Hilmi attained the rank of General in the Ottoman army. In 1920 he was Minister of Finance for the short-lived Arab Kingdom of Syria in Damascus. He became the finance minister in Transjordan from 1922 to 1924. He was a member of the Committee of Union and Progress.

== In Mandatory Palestine ==
In 1926 he arrived in Jerusalem where he became friends with Haj Amin Husseini. He worked with him in the Supreme Muslim Council where until 1930 Hilmi served as Inspector General of Awqaf, the organisation which controlled and regulated properties bequeathed to charities under Islamic law. He later began his banking career when he joined the Arab Bank, which had been established in Jerusalem by Abdul Hamid Shoman in 1930. A few years later Ahmed Hilmi founded his own bank, the Arab National Bank. He was one of the early members of the Istiqlal (Independence) Party which was set up in 1932 and in April 1936 he was named as a member of the Arab Higher Committee becoming its treasurer.

In 1937, he, along with other members of the Higher Committee not already in exile, was deported to the Seychelles Islands. In 1939, he was allowed to attend the London Conference at St. James Palace, where he urged the Higher Committee to accept the British proposals later set out in the 1939 White paper. Regarded by the authorities as a moderate, he was allowed back to Palestine in early 1940 and resumed his post as chairman of the National Bank. He purchased the newspaper Filistin and used it to present Istiqlal policies to the public. The war years were very profitable for the Palestinian economy and the bank had large deposits to invest. In August 1943 he set up the Arab National Fund the purpose of which was to buy land from farmers who were heavily in dept and to encourage the establishment of Awqaf whose proceeds would be allocated to the Fund. By the middle of 1946, the Fund had an income of £P150,000 and owned 15,000 dunams (3,750 acres) of land. It had offices in all the Arab towns and in most of the large villages. Since the Supreme Muslim Council had been abolished the Fund was the only institution offering an alternative to land purchases by the Jewish National Fund. Its success was seen as a threat by followers of the Haj Amin Husseini, who had formed the Palestine Arab Party with most of its leaders in exile. With the end of the war the fund went into decline.

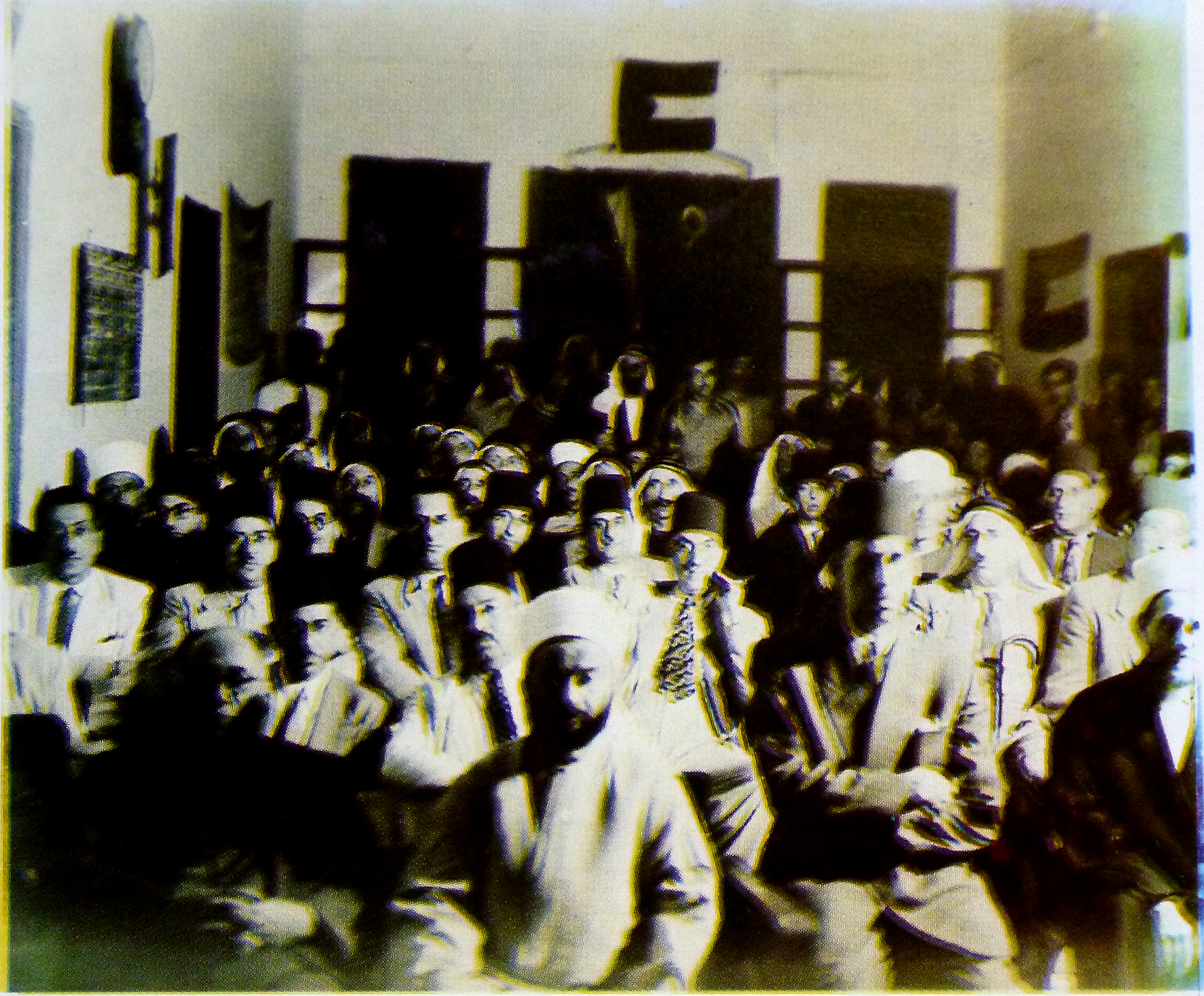
Declaration of establishment of Palestinian Government. El-Falah school, Gaza City. 22 September 1948.

As the situation in Palestine deteriorated, the Arab League tried to impose a united front on the various Palestinian Arab factions. Eventually in January 1947, after four attempts, a five-member Arab Higher Committee was set up, which included Hilmi. Husayin al-Khalidi and Hilmi were the only members of this Committee actually resident in Palestine during 1947 and 1948.

== Prime Minister of All-Palestine Government ==
On 9 July 1948, following the declaration of Israeli statehood, the Arab League set up the Administrative Council for Palestine, chaired by Hilmi. On 22 September the National Assembly was set up in Gaza, with Haj Amin Husseini as President and Hilmi as Prime Minister. The assembly ceased to function following the Israeli army victories in Southern Palestine and the Arab Legion assuming control over Bethlehem and Hebron. In 1949 Hilmi became a district military governor in the West Bank and later he served as the Palestinian representative to the Arab League.

== Later years and death ==
Ahmed Hilmi Pasha was residing in Cairo and went to Lebanon for treatment. He died in Souk El Gharb, Lebanon, in 1963. He was buried in Jerusalem.

== See also ==
- Palestinian Authority
- Hamas Government in Gaza

Political offices
New office	Prime Minister of Palestine; 1948–1959	Vacant Title next held by Mahmoud Abbas
