= Occupation of the West Bank =

The occupation of the West Bank may refer to:

- Jordanian annexation of the West Bank, 1948–1967
- Israeli occupation of the West Bank, 1967–present
