= All-Palestine Government =

1948–1959 Egyptian client government of Gaza

- Arabic: حكومة عموم فلسطين
- Flag of the All-Palestine Government

Overview
- Established: 22 September 1948 – June 1959
- State: All-Palestine Protectorate
- Leader: Prime Minister of All-Palestine
- Appointed by: President of All-Palestine
- Main organ: Cabinet
- Ministries: 12
- Responsible to: Arab League (1948–52); Republic of Egypt (1952–53)
- Headquarters: Gaza City (Sep.–Dec. 1948); Cairo, Egypt (Dec.1948–1953)

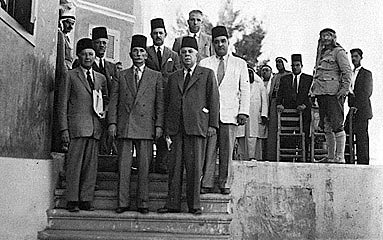
All-Palestine Government (c. 1950)

The All-Palestine Government (Arabic: حكومة عموم فلسطين, Ḥukūmat ‘Umūm Filasṭīn) was established on 22 September 1948, during the 1948 Arab–Israeli War, to govern the Egyptian-controlled territory in Gaza, which Egypt had on the same day declared as the All-Palestine Protectorate. It was confirmed by the Arab League and recognised by six of the then seven Arab League members, with Transjordan being the exception. Though it claimed jurisdiction over the whole of the former Mandatory Palestine, its effective jurisdiction was limited to the All-Palestine Protectorate, which came to be called the Gaza Strip. The President of the protectorate was Hajj Amin al-Husseini, former chairman of the Arab Higher Committee, and the Prime Minister was Ahmed Hilmi Pasha. The legislative body was the All-Palestine National Council.

Shortly thereafter, in October, King Abdullah I of Transjordan began to take steps to effect the annexation of those parts of Palestine that his army and other Arab forces had captured and held during the 1948 Arab-Israeli War. Then, on 1 December 1948, the Jericho Conference named him "King of Arab Palestine". The Congress called for the union of Arab Palestine and Transjordan and Abdullah announced his intention to annex the West Bank. The other Arab League member states opposed Abdullah's plan.

Initially, the All-Palestine Government was based in Gaza, but was relocated to Cairo following the Israeli invasion in December 1948, and was never permitted to return to Gaza, though the Gaza Strip remained under Egyptian control through the war. The importance of the All-Palestine Government gradually declined, especially after the relocation to Cairo. In parallel to the 1952 Egyptian Revolution, the authority of the government further degraded, being put by the Arab League under the official aegis of Egypt. In 1953, the All-Palestine Government was nominally dissolved, except the position of prime minister, with Hilmi attending Arab League meetings on behalf of the All-Palestine Protectorate. In 1959, the All-Palestine nominal area was de jure merged into the United Arab Republic, coming under formal Egyptian military administration, who appointed Egyptian military administrators in Gaza.

The All-Palestine Government is regarded by some as the first attempt to establish an independent Palestinian state. However, it was under official Egyptian protection, and had no executive role. The government had mostly political and symbolic significance. The All-Palestine Government's credentials as a bona fide sovereign rule were questioned by many, mainly due to the government's effective reliance upon not only Egyptian military support but also Egyptian political and economic power. Egypt, however, both formally and informally renounced any and all territorial claims to Palestine territory (in contrast to the government of Transjordan, which declared its annexation of the West Bank).

== Background ==
=== British rule ===
During the Sinai and Palestine campaign of World War I, British forces captured Palestine from the Ottoman Empire. Prior to the war, the region's exact boundaries had never been clearly defined by the Ottoman authorities. After the conflict's end in 1918, the British government received a mandate for Palestine from the League of Nations at the San Remo conference in 1920, subsequently partitioning the region into Mandatory Palestine and the Emirate of Transjordan. As per the terms of the mandate, both regions were intended to be administered by Britain on behalf of the League of Nations until they eventually became independent.

There was opposition from the Arab population of Palestine to the objectives set out in the mandate, and civil unrest persisted throughout the term of the mandate. Various attempts were made to reconcile the Arab community with the growing Jewish population without success. Several partition plans were proposed. The United Nations (UN) proposed the Partition Plan of 1947 which proposed that the Gaza area would become part of a new Arab Palestinian state. The Arab states rejected the UN partition plan, which heralded the start of the 1947–48 Civil War in Mandatory Palestine. Ernest Bevin, then serving as the British Foreign Secretary, stated in regards to the partition plan that "The majority proposal is so manifestly unjust to the Arabs that it is difficult to see how, in Sir Alexander Cadogan's words, 'we could reconcile it with our conscience." Transjordan had been recognised as an independent government throughout most of the mandatory period, but it was officially recognised as an independent state by the United Kingdom in the Treaty of London (1946). Some countries continued to dispute its independent status.

=== End of the Mandate ===
With the announcement by Britain that it would unilaterally withdraw from Palestine by 15 May 1948, the various groups in the region commenced manoeuvres to secure their positions and objectives in the power vacuum brought on by the end of British control. The objective of the surrounding Arab countries in the take-over of the whole of Palestine was set out on April 12, 1948, when the Arab League announced:

The Arab armies shall enter Palestine to rescue it. His Majesty (King Farouk, representing the League) would like to make it clearly understood that such measures should be looked upon as temporary and devoid of any character of the occupation or partition of Palestine, and that after completion of its liberation, that country would be handed over to its owners to rule in the way they like.

Israel declared its independence on 14 May 1948, the day before the expiration of the Mandate (because 15 May was the Jewish Sabbath). On 15 May 1948, the Egyptian army invaded the territory of the former British mandate from the south, starting the 1948 Arab–Israeli War.

== Formation of the All-Palestine Government ==
An Egyptian Ministerial order dated 1 June 1948 declared that all laws in force during the Mandate would continue to be in force in the Gaza Strip. On 8 July 1948, the Arab League decided to set up a temporary civil administration in Palestine, to be directly responsible to the Arab League. This plan was strongly opposed by King Abdullah I of Transjordan and received only half-hearted support from the Arab Higher Committee, which had itself been set up in 1945 by the Arab League. The new administration was never properly established. Another order issued on 8 August 1948 vested an Egyptian Administrator-General with the powers of the High Commissioner.

The Egyptian government, suspicious of King Abdullah's intentions and growing power in Palestine, put a proposal to the Arab League meeting that opened in Alexandria on 6 September 1948. The plan would turn the temporary civil administration, which had been agreed to in July, into an Arab government with a seat in Gaza for the whole of Palestine. The formal announcement of the Arab League's decision to form the Government of All-Palestine was issued on 20 September. Egypt declared formation of the All-Palestine Protectorate on 22 September 1948.

The All-Palestine Government was formed under the nominal leadership of Amin al-Husayni, the Mufti of Jerusalem. Ahmed Hilmi Abd al-Baqi was named Prime Minister. Hilmi's cabinet consisted largely of relatives and followers of Amin al-Husayni, but also included representatives of other factions of the Palestinian ruling class. Jamal al-Husayni became foreign minister, Raja al-Husayni became defence minister, Michel Abikarios was finance minister, Husayn al-Khalidi was health minister, Awni Abd al-Hadi was minister for social affairs and Anwar Nusseibeh was secretary of the cabinet. Twelve ministers in all, from different Arab countries, headed for Gaza to take up their new positions. The decision to set up the All-Palestine Government made the Arab Higher Committee irrelevant, but Amin al-Husayni continued to exercise an influence in Palestinian affairs.

The All-Palestine National Council was convened in Gaza on 30 September 1948 under the chairmanship of Amin al-Husayni. The council passed a series of resolutions culminating on 1 October 1948 with a declaration of independence over the whole of Palestine, with Jerusalem as its capital. It formally adopted the Flag of the Arab Revolt that had been used by Arab nationalists since 1917 and revived the Holy War Army with the declared aim of liberating Palestine.

Abdullah regarded the attempt to revive al-Husayni's Holy War Army as a challenge to his authority and on 3 October his minister of defence ordered all armed bodies operating in the areas controlled by the Arab Legion to be disbanded. Glubb Pasha carried out the order ruthlessly and efficiently. The sum effect was that:

'The leadership of al-Hajj Amin al-Husayni and the Arab Higher Committee, which had dominated the Palestinian political scene since the 1920s, was devastated by the disaster of 1948 and discredited by its failure to prevent it.'

After Israel began a counter-offensive on the southern front on 15 October 1948, the All-Palestine Government was quickly recognised by six of the then seven members of the Arab League: Egypt, Syria, Lebanon, Iraq, Saudi Arabia, and Yemen, but not by Transjordan. It was not recognised by any other country.

== Cabinet of the All-Palestine Government ==
No.	Portrait	Name	Portfolio
1		Ahmed Hilmi Pasha	Prime Minister of Palestine
2		Jamal al-Husayni	Minister of Foreign Affairs
3		Michel Abikarios	Minister of Finance
4		Awni Abd al-Hadi	Minister of Social Affairs
5		Raja al-Husayni	Minister of Defence
6		Hussein Khalidi	Minister of Health
7		Muhammad Ali Saleh	Minister of Education
8		Suleiman Toukan	Minister of Transportation
9		Foti Freij	Minister of Economy
10		Yosef Zion	Minister of Propaganda
11		Ali Al-Hassan	Minister of Justice
12		Amin Aqel	Minister of Agriculture
13		Anwar Nuseibeh	Secretary of the Cabinet

== Activities of the All-Palestine Government ==
=== After the declaration ===
Despite its lofty declarations and goals, the All-Palestine Government proved to be generally ineffectual. The Palestinian Arabs, and the Arab world in general, were shocked by the speed and extent of the Israeli victories, and the poor showing of the Arab armies. This, combined with the expansionist designs of King Abdullah, cast the Palestinian Arab leadership into disarray.

Avi Shlaim writes:

'The decision to form the Government of All-Palestine in Gaza, and the feeble attempt to create armed forces under its control, furnished the members of the Arab League with the means of divesting themselves of direct responsibility for the prosecution of the war and of withdrawing their armies from Palestine with some protection against popular outcry. Whatever the long-term future of the Arab government of Palestine, its immediate purpose, as conceived by its Egyptian sponsors, was to provide a focal point of opposition to Abdullah and serve as an instrument for frustrating his ambition to federate the Arab regions with Transjordan'.

Due to the conflicting interests of Arab nations, particularly between the Kingdom of Egypt and the Kingdom of Jordan under Abdullah I of Jordan, who sought to incorporate sections of Palestine, the government quickly deteriorated, resulting in the declaration of independence becoming ineffective. Abdullah I argued that the separation between Palestine and Transjordan is contrived and unproductive.

=== First years ===
The 1948 Arab-Israeli War came to an end with the Israel-Egypt Armistice Agreement of 24 February 1949, which fixed the boundaries of the Gaza Strip. The All-Palestine Government was not a party to the Agreement nor involved in its negotiation. The Gaza Strip was the only area of the former British Mandate territory that was under the nominal control of the All-Palestine Government. The rest of the British Mandate territory became either part of Israel or the West Bank, annexed by Transjordan (a move that was not recognised internationally). In reality, the Gaza Strip was under Egyptian administration, though Egypt never made any claim to or annexed any Palestinian territory. Egypt did not offer the Palestinians citizenship.

There was an enormous influx into the Gaza Strip of Palestinian refugees from those parts of the former Mandate Palestine that became part of Israel. From the end of 1949, the refugees received aid directly from UNRWA and not from or through the All-Palestine Government. There is no evidence of any All-Palestine Government involvement in the negotiations for the setting up of UNRWA-run refugee camps in the Gaza Strip or anywhere else.

=== Under Nasser's policies ===
After the Egyptian Revolution of 1952 and the rise to power of Gamal Abdel Nasser, Egyptian support for Pan-Arabism and the Palestinian cause increased. However, the new rule increasingly acted to degrade the Palestinian self-rule. In 1952, All-Palestine being put by the Arab League under the official aegis of Egypt. In 1953, the All-Palestine Government was nominally dissolved, except the Prime Minister Hilmi position, who kept attending the Arab League meetings on behalf of All-Palestine.

During the Suez War of 1956 Israel invaded the Gaza Strip and the Egyptian Sinai Peninsula. Israel eventually withdrew from the territories it had invaded, and the All-Palestine Government continued to have official sovereignty in Gaza.

In 1957, the Basic Law of Gaza established a Legislative Council that could pass laws that were given to the High Administrator-General for approval.

=== Dissolution ===
The situation changed again after the 1958 unification of Egypt and Syria in the United Arab Republic. In June 1959, Gamal Abdel Nasser officially annulled the All-Palestine Government by decree, reasoning that the All-Palestine Government had failed to advance the Palestinian cause. In addition, Nasser proclaimed his intention to work towards the formation of a new Palestinian government that would fight for the "liberation of all Palestine". This plan met the opposition of the Jordanian government, that held at that time the West Bank under its control. At that time, Amin al-Husayni moved from Egypt to Lebanon and the Gaza Strip became directly administered by Egypt. In March 1962 a Constitution for the Gaza Strip was issued by the Egyptian government, establishing a new Legislative Council. Egyptian administration as well as the functioning of that legislative council came to an end in June 1967 when the Gaza Strip was captured by Israel in the Six-Day War.

== See also ==
- All-Palestine Protectorate
- All-Palestine National Council
- Hamas government in Gaza
