= Israeli occupation of the Gaza Strip =

Israeli military occupation of Gaza

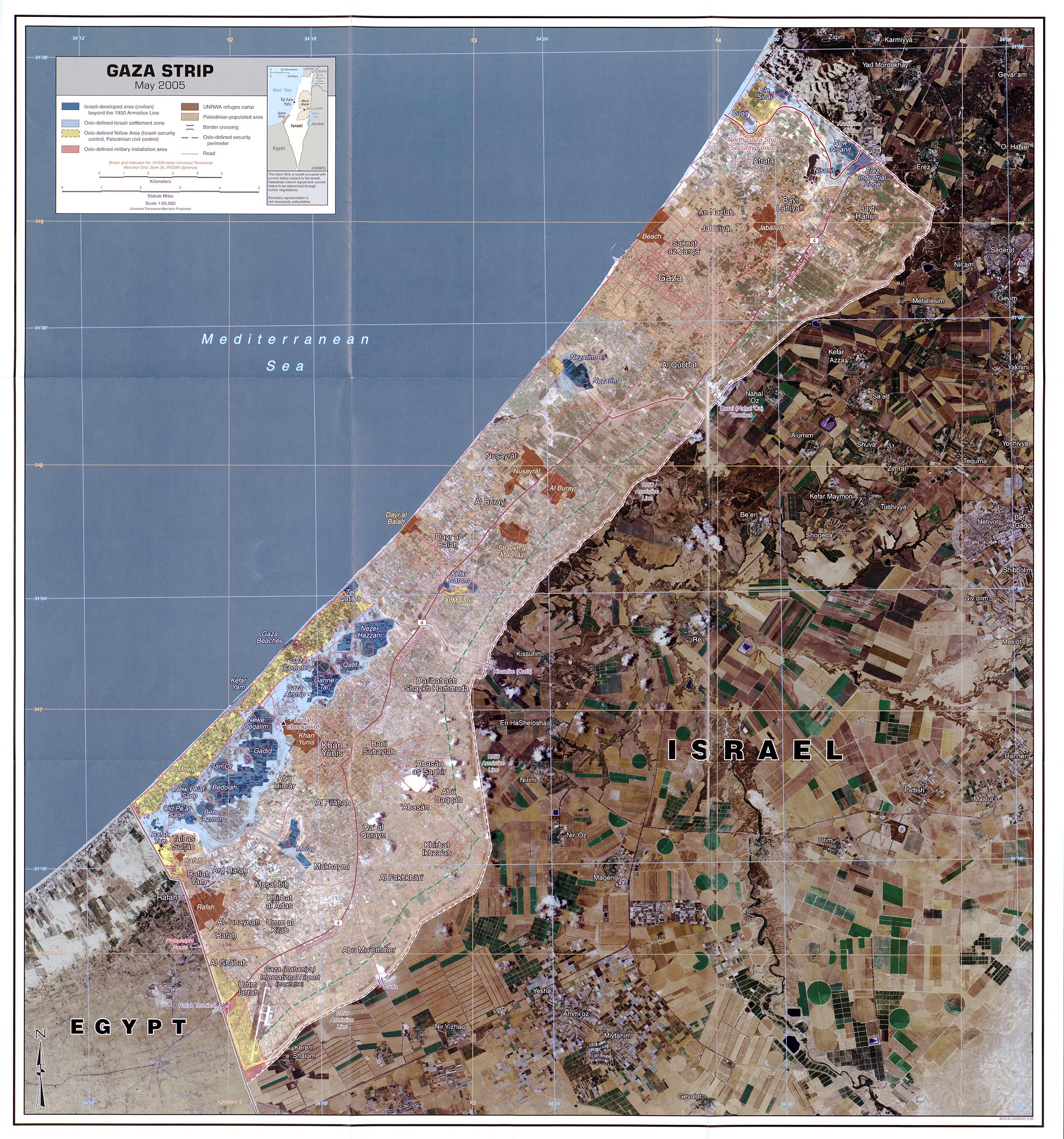
Aerial photo of the Gaza Strip in May 2005, with Israeli settlements shown in blue prior to their abolition in the Israeli disengagement from Gaza.

In 1956, the Gaza Strip was captured by Israel from Egypt for a period of four months during the Suez Crisis. Israel returned it back to Egypt in March 1957, due to heavy international pressure. Israel captured it again on 6 June 1967 during the Six-Day War. The United Nations, international human rights organizations, International Court of Justice, European Union, International Criminal Court, most of the international community and most legal academics and experts regard the Gaza Strip to still be under military occupation by Israel, as Israel still maintains direct control over Gaza's air and maritime space, six of Gaza's seven land crossings, a no-go buffer zone within the territory, and the Palestinian population registry. Israel, the United States, and other legal, military, and foreign policy experts otherwise contend that Israel "ceded the effective control needed under the legal definition of occupation" upon its disengagement in 2005. Israel continues to maintain a blockade of the Gaza Strip, limiting the movement of goods and people in and out of the Gaza Strip.

== Background ==
The Gaza Strip—a 28-mile-long and 6-mile-wide strip along the Mediterranean coast with small towns and refugee camps in the former territory of Mandatory Palestine, delineated by the Green Line of the 1949 Armistice Agreements—was constituted in the aftermath of the Nakba and the 1948 Palestine war, when it came under Egyptian administration (1949–67) through the client government of the All-Palestine Protectorate (1948–59) established by the Arab League and later under the United Arab Republic (1959–67).

== History ==
=== 1956–1957 Israeli four-month occupation ===
In 1956, Egypt blockaded the Gulf of Aqaba, assumed national control of the Suez Canal, and blocked it to Israeli shipping—threatening the recently established State of Israel and breaching the terms of the 1888 Convention of Constantinople, which the Khedivate of Egypt was not invited to attend. Israel, France and the United Kingdom invaded the Gaza Strip and Sinai Peninsula, initiating the 1956 Suez War. Under international pressure, the Anglo-French Task Force withdrew before the end of 1956. The Israeli army withdrew in March 1957, ending Israel's four-month-long occupation of the Sinai and Gaza Strip.

During this period, American-Israeli photographer Moshe Marlin Levin documented life there in color photographs that highlight the lively commerce, cleanliness and positive reception of the Israeli presence.

=== 1967–1994 Israeli Military-Civil Administration ===
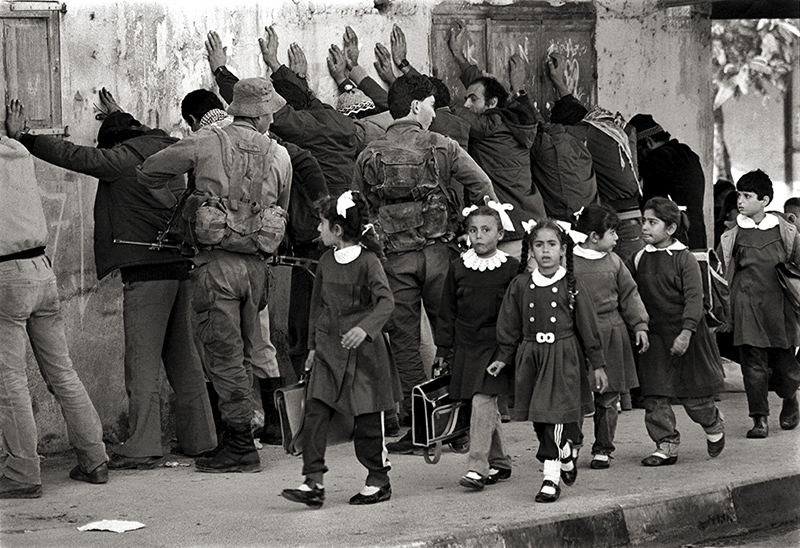
Gazan schoolgirls returning home come across Israeli soldiers frisking a group of Palestinian men following the stabbing of a Jew. November 1986

In 1967, after Egypt blockaded the Straits of Tiran and cut off Israeli shipping, Israel attacked Egypt, initiating the Six-Day War. It quickly defeated the surrounding Arab states and occupied the Gaza Strip, along with the West Bank and other territory, ending Egypt's occupation. The Israeli Military Governorate was a military governance system established following the Six-Day War in June 1967, in order to govern the civilian population of the West Bank, the Gaza Strip, the Sinai Peninsula and the western part of Golan Heights. The governance was based on the Fourth Geneva Convention, which provides guidelines for military rule in occupied areas. During this period, the UN and many sources referred to the military governed areas as Occupied Arab Territories.

In 1982, in the wake of the Egypt–Israel peace treaty, Israel gave up the Sinai Peninsula and established the Israeli Civil Administration to oversee the administration of the West Bank and Gaza Strip.

=== 2005 Israeli disengagement from Gaza ===
According to Ilias Bantekas and Safaa S. Jaber, "the human rights (HR) obligations inherent in the occupation, made it financially, politically, and morally costly for Israel" as an occupying power. In 2003, Israeli Prime Minister Ariel Sharon proposed Israel's disengagement from Gaza, and disengagement plans were adopted by the government and Knesset in 2004 and 2005.

In 2005, Israel disengaged (Note: For Ilias Bantekas and Safaa S. Jaber, the "so-called" disengagement, "did not necessarily constitute an end to the occupation" as "the absence of Israeli troops on the territory of Gaza was a mere technicality, since the Israeli military redeployed outside of Gaza while maintaining troops on the external land border and reserving exclusive control over Gaza’s airspace and territorial waters" which was "followed by an official declaration stipulating that Gaza was in fact a ‘hostile territory’ and Israel proceeded to impose a blockade against it.") from the Gaza Strip by withdrawing its forces and dismantling and evacuating its 21 settlements there, though it redeployed and maintained troops on the borders outside of Gaza and took exclusive control of the airspace over Gaza and its territorial waters. Israel maintained restrictions and active control on the movement of people and goods in the Gaza Strip, with the stated aims of preventing the smuggling of weapons into Gaza and exerting economic pressure on Hamas. The decision to disengage from Gaza was largely opposed by the Israeli public. In May 2004, a referendum showed that 65% of voters were against the disengagement plan.

In the view of the majority of the relevant scholarship, the United Nations, the International Court of Justice, and many other international non-governmental humanitarian and legal organizations, Israel has continued to be regarded as an occupying power in the Gaza Strip, which has continued to be regarded as among the occupied Palestinian territories. The official Israeli view and certain pro-Israel scholars consider the Gaza Strip to be unoccupied.

=== 2005–2007 ===
Israel withdrew from Gaza in September 2005. Control of the Gaza–Egypt border was handed over to Egypt and the Fatah-dominated PA was given control of the Rafah Border Crossing. The 2005 Philadelphi Accord between Israel and Egypt turned over control of the border to Egypt. From February 2005, a technocrat Fatah-led PA government controlled the Palestinian National Security Forces. From November 2005 until June 2007, the Rafah Crossing was jointly controlled by Egypt and the Palestinian Authority, with the European Union monitoring the activities from 24 November 2005 on the Gazan side. Tensions between Fatah and Hamas intensified after Hamas won the elections of 2006. Hamas formed its Executive Force with Jamal abu Samhadana, a prominent militant, at its head. Abbas and Fatah commanders refused to take orders from the Hamas-led Palestinian Authority government. The Fatah-backed President Abbas was supported by the international community and more or less tolerated by Israel. The Hamas-dominated Palestinian Authority and the parliament were boycotted, and international financial aid was rendered via Abbas.

In December 2006, Abbas called for new parliamentary and presidential elections. Hamas characterized it as an attempted Fatah coup by Abbas and violence broke out. Abbas's means of enforcing order appeared to be coercive action by police and security units under his command, which were relatively weak in the Gaza Strip, Hamas's stronghold. In February 2007, the Saudi-brokered Fatah–Hamas Mecca Agreement produced an agreement on a Palestinian national unity government which was short-lived. In June 2007, Hamas took control and removed Fatah officials. Human Rights Watch accused both sides with violations of international humanitarian law including the targeting and killing of civilians, public executions of political opponents and captives, throwing prisoners off high-rise apartment buildings, fighting in hospitals, and shooting from a jeep marked with "TV" insignias. The ICRC denounced attacks in and around two hospitals in the northern part of the Gaza strip. The Israeli government closed all check-points on the borders of Gaza in response to the violence. Palestinian President Mahmoud Abbas announced the dissolution of the unity government. Sami Abu Zuhri asserted that Palestinian Prime Minister Ismail Haniyeh remained the head of the government. Neither Hamas nor Fatah had enough votes to form a new government under the constitution.

=== 2007–2023 ===
Hamas has governed the Gaza Strip in Palestine since its takeover of the territory from the rival Fatah-ruled Palestinian Authority (PA) on 14 June 2007. The Hamas administration was first led by Ismail Haniyeh from June 2007 until February 2017; then by Yahya Sinwar until his killing in October 2024; and since then by Mohammed Sinwar.

=== 2023–present Gaza war ===
Current military situation in the Gaza Strip: Gaza Strip under Palestinian control Gaza Strip under Israeli control Claimed furthest Israeli advance in Gaza Evacuated areas inside Israel Maximum extent of the 2023 Hamas-led attack on Israel Area of Gaza subject to Israeli evacuation orders

On October 7, 2023, Hamas and its allies invaded Israel, killing 1,195 people and taking around 250 hostages, mostly civilians. In response, Israel launched an invasion of the Gaza Strip.

In early January 2024, Israel reoccupied most of the northern Gaza Strip after Israel claimed that it had dismantled 12 Izz ad-Din al-Qassam Brigades battalions on 7 January. This led to the beginning of the insurgency in the North Gaza Strip and also the beginning of the Israeli reoccupation of the Gaza Strip, some 19 years after Israel had disengaged from the Gaza Strip in 2005 due to stiff resistance from the Palestinians. However, Israel has been continuously imposing a blockade of the Gaza Strip since 2007.

At the beginning of the Gaza war, Israel made it clear that controlling the Gaza Strip was one of the main goals. In late January 2024, Benjamin Netanyahu said that he "will not compromise on full Israeli control" over Gaza. In March 2024, Israel created a new buffer zone in Gaza with restricted access to Gazans.

Following the killing of Yahya Sinwar, the Hamas temporary committee initially discussed the possibility of appointing a single successor, but eventually opted to rule through the committee until the scheduled Hamas leadership elections in March 2025. In January 2025, a United States–brokered ceasefire went into effect, with Hamas to retain control over the Gaza Strip. The ceasefire later broke down and later attempts have also failed to end the war, blockade, and occupation.

In early April 2025, it was announced by Israeli Defense Minister Israel Katz that there would be a major expansion of Israel security zones, where large swaths of land were seized by the IDF. Katz also announced that there would be an ordered evacuation of Gaza's population from the areas, although heavy airstrikes in the area caused the deaths of multiple civilians, including children.

== Israeli settlements ==
By 2005, there were 9,000 Israeli settlers spread across 21 Israeli settlements in the Gaza Strip, while around 1.3 million Palestinians lived there. The first settlement was built in 1970, soon after Israel occupied the Gaza Strip following the Six-Day War. Each Israeli settler disposed of 400 times the land available to the Palestinian refugees, and 20 times the volume of water allowed to the peasant farmers of the Strip. Following disengagement from the Gaza Strip in 2005, all Israeli settlers were evacuated and all settlements were dismantled.

In late January 2024, it was reported by an unnamed Israeli military officer that Israeli Prime Minister Benjamin Netanyahu and others in the government had requested that military members begin to establish permanent bases in the Gaza Strip amid the 2023 Israeli invasion of the Gaza Strip following the October 7 attacks.

== See also ==
- Gaza genocide
- Policy paper: Options for a policy regarding Gaza's civilian population
- Israeli-occupied territories
- Israeli occupation of the West Bank
- Israeli apartheid
- List of Israeli settlements
- List of military occupations
