= Jericho Conference =

1948 conference on the status of the West Bank

A Palestinian delegation from the Jericho Conference presenting King Abdullah with the conference resolution for unity of the West Bank with Jordan under the Hashemite crown

The Jericho Conference (Arabic: مؤتمر أريحا) was held in December 1948 to decide the future of the portion of Palestine that was held by Jordan at the end of the 1948 Arab–Israeli War, led by Sheikh Muhammad Ali Ja'abari. At this conference, notables from the West Bank called for its annexation to Jordan.

== History ==
In October 1948, King Abdullah took steps to further the annexation of territories in Palestine that Arab forces had captured in the 1948 Arab–Israeli War.

The first step was a congress in Amman initiated by the Transjordanian government in which the delegates called for a wider Palestinian congress to declare Palestinian unity and acknowledge King Abdullah as King of Palestine. On 1 December 1948, a conference in Jericho called for the annexation of the West Bank and East Jerusalem The conference was attended by numerous delegations including the mayors of Hebron, Bethlehem, Ramallah, the Arab Legion Military Governor General, military governors of all the districts, and other notables. The audience was estimated at several thousand.

Six resolutions were proposed but only four were adopted. They contained the following provisions:

1. Palestine Arabs desire unity between Transjordan and Arab Palestine and therefore make known their wish that Arab Palestine be annexed immediately to Transjordan. They also recognize Abdullah as their king and request that he proclaim himself king of new territory.
2. Palestine Arabs express gratitude to the Arab states for their efforts on behalf of liberation of Palestine.
3. Expression of thanks to Arab states for their generous assistance and support of the Palestine Arab refugees.
4. Resolve that this resolution be conveyed to King at once.

The Transjordanian cabinet and parliament agreed within the following two weeks.

== Reactions to the resolution ==
=== Support ===
A Palestinian conference in Ramallah personally attended by King Abdullah on 26 December 1948 declared its support for the Jericho Conference resolution, as did a subsequent Nablus conference, calling for unification of the two banks of the Jordan under the Hashemite crown.

The termination of the Palestine Mandate gave the Arabs of Palestine the opportunity to exercise their right to self-determination. That meant they could determine their own political status and form or dissolve unions among themselves or with other states.

In December 1948 the Secretary of State authorized the US Consul in Amman to advise King Abdullah and the officials of Transjordan that the US accepted the principles contained in the resolutions of the Jericho Conference, and that the US viewed incorporation with Transjordan as the logical disposition of Arab Palestine. The United States subsequently extended de jure recognition to the Government of Transjordan and the Government of Israel on the same day, 31 January 1949. The 1950 State Department Country Report on Jordan said that King Abdullah had taken successive steps to incorporate the area of Central Palestine into Jordan and described the Jordanian Parliament resolution concerning the union of Central Palestine with Jordan. The report said the US had privately advised the British and French Foreign Ministers that it had approved the action, and that "it represented a logical development of the situation which took place as a result of a free expression of the will of the people." The major problems of concern to the United States were the establishment of peaceful and friendly relations between Israel and Jordan and the successful absorption into the polity and economy of Jordan of Arab Palestine, its inhabitants, and the bulk of the refugees now located there.

=== Opposition ===
The Arab League condemned the Jericho Conference, and the Syrian press considered its resolution a violation of self-determination. Iraqi prime minister Nuri as-Said called upon King Abdullah to hold his moves towards annexation which succeeded in delaying the implementation of the Transjordanian plans of unity for a year and a half. Hajj Amin al-Husseini protested against King Abdullah's measures, declaring them null and void and calling to boycott them, but his voice was ignored.

== Unification ==
Notables from Ramallah and Jerusalem in particular were reluctant to give King Abdullah a carte blanche. Although they were prepared to recognize him as monarch, they were unwilling to give up their claim to the whole of Palestine, and refused to endorse his policy of consolidating the partition.

The Transjordanian government gradually assumed the civil functions of the West Bank, paying the salaries of civil servants and absorbing local governors into what was henceforth called the Hashemite Kingdom of Jordan. In February 1949, the Jordanian Nationality Law was amended to grant every Palestinian Jordanian citizenship.

== See also ==
- All Palestine Government
