= Palestinian Legislative Council (Gaza Strip) =

The Palestinian Legislative Council was established by the Egyptian government in the Gaza Strip in 1957, and lasted until it was disbanded following the seizure of Gaza by Israel during the Six Day War in 1967. First established in 1957, it was reorganised into a 32 member body in 1962. Haidar Abdel-Shafi served as its chair during its two sessions from 1962 to 1964. The body was created to show support for the Palestinian cause and meant to govern Gaza, but never governed in practice.

== History ==
The Gaza Strip was placed under the control of Egypt following the 1948 Arab–Israeli War. In 1957, the Basic Law of Gaza established a Palestinian Legislative Council (PLC) which could pass laws which were given to the High Administrator-General for approval.

A new constitutional order for Gaza was created after Egypt passed a law on 5 March 1962. The council had 22 members that were elected and 10 members that were appointed by the governor-general. This was done as part of the policy of Egyptian president Gamal Abdel Nasser of showing support for the Palestinian cause. Nasser proclaimed that it would hold authority over Gaza, but that power was never granted in practice.

Haidar Abdel-Shafi served as chair of the PLC from 1962 to 1964 during its two sessions; he was later elected to the Palestinian Legislative Council in 1996. In his role as chair he attended the first Palestine National Council, which led to the establishment of the Palestine Liberation Organization. Gaza was seized by Israel during the Six-Day War, this resulted in the end of Egypt's administration of Gaza and the PLC being disbanded.

== See also ==
- All-Palestine National Council
- Palestinian National Council

== Works cited ==
=== Books ===
- Howard-Hassmann, Rhoda; Walton-Roberts, Margaret, eds. (2015). The Human Right to Citizenship: A Slippery Concept. University of Pennsylvania Press. ISBN 9780812247176.

=== Journals ===
- "A Gaza Chronology, 1948–2008". Journal of Palestine Studies. 38 (3). Taylor & Francis: 98–121. 2009. doi:10.1525/jps.2009.xxxviii.3.98. JSTOR jps.2009.xxxviii.3.98.
- Frisch, Hillel (2009). "The Death of the PLO". Middle Eastern Studies. 45 (2). Taylor & Francis: 243–261. doi:10.2307/40262660. JSTOR 40262660.

=== News ===
- Brittain, Victoria (26 September 2007). "Haider Abdel-Shafi". The Guardian. Archived from the original on 4 November 2026.

=== Web ===
- "Haydar Abd al-Shafi". Interactive Encyclopedia of the Palestine Question. Archived from the original on 22 May 2022.
