= United Arab Republic occupation of the Gaza Strip =

Egyptian military rule over the Gaza Strip (1949–1967)

Gaza Strip قطاع غزة Qiṭāʿ Ġazzah
- 1959–1967
- Flag Coat of arms

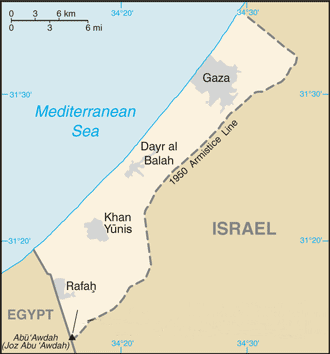
- Map of the Gaza Strip after the 1949 Armistice Agreements, which established the Green Line between Israel and the Arab countries
- Status: Territory occupied by the United Arab Republic
- Capital: Cairo
- Common languages: Arabic
- Religion: Sunni Islam (majority); Eastern Orthodox Christianity (minority)
- Demonyms: Arab; Palestinian; Gazan
- Legislature: Palestinian Legislative Council
- Historical era: Cold War
  - Merged with the United Arab Republic: 1959
  - Six-Day War: 1967
  - Egypt–Israel peace treaty: 1979
- Currency: Egyptian pound
Preceded by	Succeeded by
All-Palestine Protectorate	Israeli Military Governorate
- Today part of: Gaza Strip

The United Arab Republic occupation of the Gaza Strip began in 1959 following the dissolution of the All-Palestine Protectorate, which had ruled the Gaza Strip as a client state of Egypt since the 1948 Arab–Israeli War, and its merger with the United Arab Republic.

The 1949 Armistice Agreements, which ended the Arab–Israeli War by delineating the Green Line as the armistice line between Israel and its four neighboring countries (Lebanon, Syria, Jordan, and Egypt), left the Kingdom of Egypt in control of a small swath of territory that was part of Mandatory Palestine prior to the war. That swath of territory became known as the Gaza Strip. In 1949 Egypt created the client state named the All-Palestine Government which lasted until 1959, the year after the Republic of Egypt and the Second Syrian Republic merged to form a single sovereign state known as the United Arab Republic. The Egyptian occupation of the Gaza Strip was interrupted for 4 months in late 1956 and early 1957 when Israel briefly occupied the strip as part of the 1956 Suez Crisis. The Egyptian occupation ended entirely during the 1967 Six-Day War, after which the territory became occupied by Israel with the establishment of the Israeli Military Governorate.

Ultimately dissolved by Egyptian president Gamal Abdel Nasser in 1959, the All-Palestine Government was largely symbolic since it was established in 1948, but nonetheless garnered diplomatic recognition from most members of the Arab League. Since the 1979 Egypt–Israel peace treaty, the official Egyptian position has supported the creation of an independent Palestinian state that encompasses the Gaza Strip in addition to the Israeli-occupied West Bank.

== Background ==
=== British Mandate ===
After the First World War, the League of Nations granted the United Kingdom authority over the Mandate for Palestine composed of former Ottoman territory, including the Gaza Strip. What became known as the British Mandate for Palestine was formally confirmed by the Council of the League of Nations on 24 July 1922 and which came into effect on 26 September 1923.

=== 1948 Arab–Israeli War ===
On 15 May 1948, just over three years after the end of the Second World War in Europe, the British Mandate for Palestine ended. Prior to this, on 29 November 1947, the United Nations General Assembly approved the 1947 UN Partition Plan to create in Palestine two states, one Jewish and one Arab. The 1947–1948 Civil War in Mandatory Palestine broke out in response. On 14 May 1948, David Ben-Gurion issued the Israeli Declaration of Independence and the following day the armies of Egypt, Jordan and Syria declared war and invaded, aided by soldiers sent from the Hashemite Kingdom of Iraq, starting the 1948 Arab–Israeli War. Egypt made gains early in the war, but these were reversed in late December 1948 when the Israeli army, in "Operation Horev", drove Egyptian forces out of the Negev Desert and encircled the Egyptian forces in the Gaza Strip, forcing Egypt to withdraw and accept a ceasefire. On 7 January 1949, a truce was achieved. Israeli forces proceeded to withdraw from Sinai and Gaza, leaving them to be occupied by Egypt.

=== Egypt's All-Palestine Protectorate (1948–1959) ===
The All-Palestine Protectorate was an entity established by the Arab League on 22 September 1948, during the 1948 Arab–Israeli War, purportedly to provide Palestinian governance for Palestine. After the war, the Gaza Strip was the only former-Mandate territory under the jurisdiction of the All-Palestine Government. However, the members of the Government were consequently removed to Cairo, and had little or no influence over events in the Gaza Strip.

On 24 February 1949, the Israel–Egypt Armistice Agreement was signed in Rhodes. Under the agreement, the armistice line was drawn along the international border (dating from 1906) except near the Mediterranean Sea, where the Kingdom of Egypt remained in control of a strip of land along the coast, which became known as the Gaza Strip. (See 1949 Armistice Agreements.)

According to Avi Shlaim:

[T]he contrast between the pretensions of the All-Palestine Government and its capability quickly reduced it to the level of farce. It claimed jurisdiction over the whole of Palestine, yet it had no administration, no civil service, no money, and no real army of its own. Even in the small enclave around the town of Gaza its writ ran only by the grace of the Egyptian authorities. Taking advantage of the new government's dependence on them for funds and protection, the Egyptian paymasters manipulated it to undermine Abdullah's claim to represent the Palestinians in the Arab League and in international forums. Ostensibly the embryo for an independent Palestinian state, the new government, from the moment of its inception, was thus reduced to the unhappy role of a shuttlecock in the ongoing power struggle between Cairo and Amman.

==== Suez Crisis (1956) ====
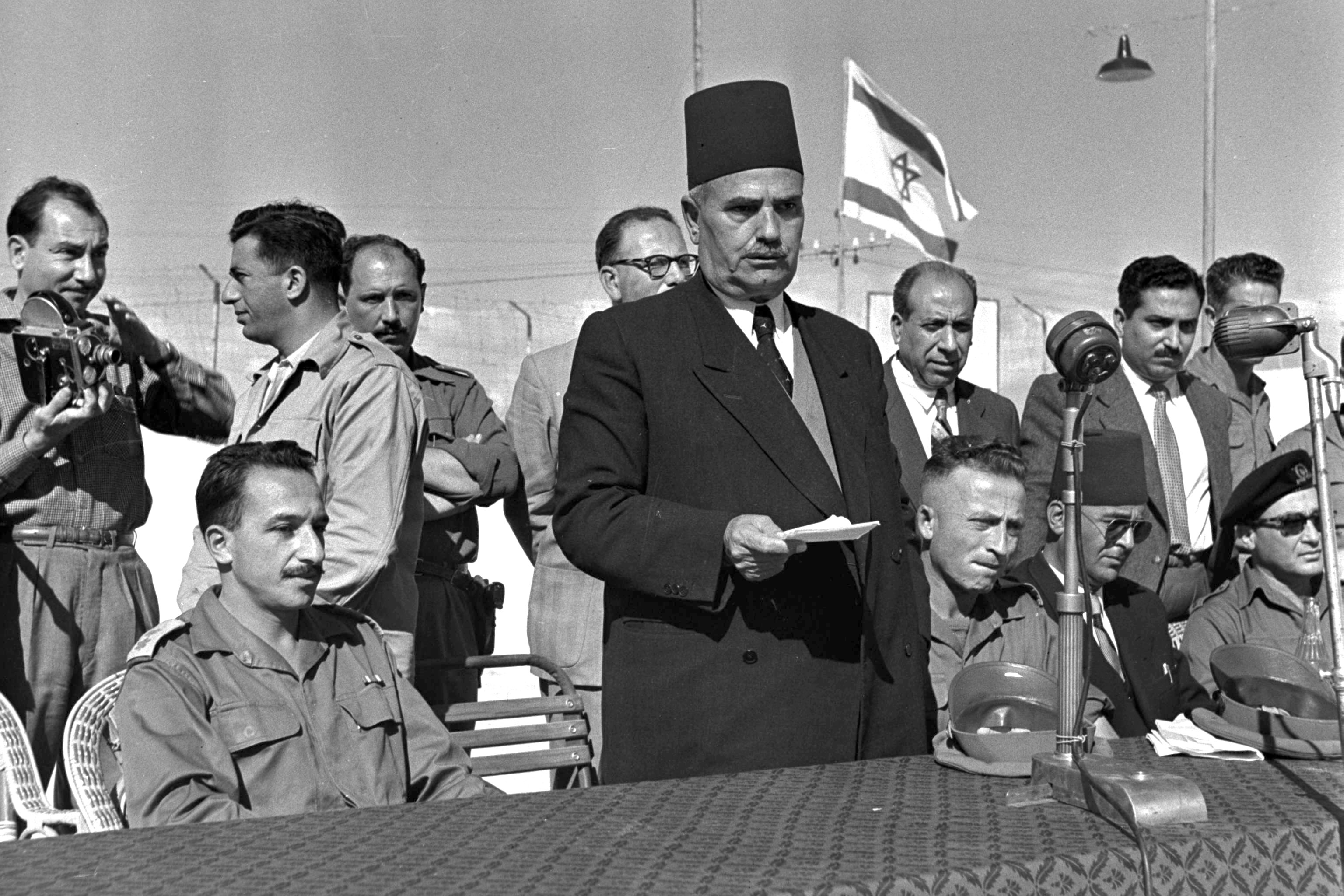
The newly appointed mayor of Gaza, Rushdi al-Shawwa, speaking at the inauguration ceremony of the Gaza municipal council, 26 November 1956

The Egyptian monarchy was abolished in June 1953, with the Kingdom of Egypt being superseded by the Arab Republic of Egypt. In 1956, Egypt blockaded the Gulf of Aqaba, assumed national control of the Suez Canal, and blocked it to Israeli shipping—both threatening the young State of Israel and violating the Convention of Constantinople of 1888. France and the United Kingdom supported Israel in its determination that the Canal should remain open to all nations as per the Convention.

On 29 October 1956, Israel, France and the United Kingdom invaded the Gaza Strip and Sinai Peninsula, initiating the 1956 Suez War. Under international pressure, the Anglo-French Task Force withdrew before the end of 1956, and the Israeli army withdrew from the Sinai and Gaza in March 1957.

== History ==
=== United Arab Republic (1958–1971) ===
In 1959, the Gaza Strip was officially merged into the short-lived United Arab Republic (UAR, which united Egypt and Syria). In September 1961, Syria became an independent state again by withdrawing from the UAR. However, Egypt continued to be officially termed the UAR until 1971, when it was officially renamed as the Arab Republic of Egypt once again. In 1962, the UAR government established a Palestinian Legislative Council elected by the population. The constitutional document began with the following:

The Gaza Strip is an indivisible part of the land of Palestine and its people are part of the Arab Nation. The Palestinians in the Gaza Strip shall form a National Union composed of all Palestinians wherever they may be – its aim being the joint work to recover the usurped lands of Palestine, and the participation in fulfilling the call of Arab Nationalism. The National Union shall be organised by a decree from the Governor-General.

When the Palestine Liberation Organization (PLO) was founded in 1964, Nasser proclaimed that it would hold authority over Gaza, but that power was never granted in practice. A year later, conscription was instituted for the Palestine Liberation Army (PLA).

==== 1967 Arab–Israeli War ====
The Six-Day War from 5 to 10 June 1967 ended Egypt's occupation, with the Israelis occupying the Gaza Strip along with the West Bank and the Golan Heights.

=== Camp David Accords (1978) ===
In 1978, Israel and Egypt signed the historic Camp David Accords which brought an official end to the strife between them. The second part of the accords was a framework for the establishment of an autonomous regime in the West Bank and the Gaza Strip. The Arab Republic of Egypt thus renounced any territorial claims over the Gaza Strip.

=== Egypt–Israel peace treaty (1979) ===
In 1979, the Egypt–Israel peace treaty was signed. Egypt became the first Arab country to recognize Israel's sovereignty and has since supported the two-state solution, advocating the creation of an independent Palestinian state encompassing the West Bank and the Gaza Strip, both of which have been under Israeli occupation since the 1967 war.

== Economy and demographics ==
The influx of over 200,000 refugees into Gaza during the 1948 war resulted in a dramatic decrease in the standard of living. Because the Egyptian government restricted movement to and from the Gaza Strip, its inhabitants could not look elsewhere for gainful employment. In 1955, one observer (a member of the United Nations Secretariat) noted that "For all practical purposes it would be true to say that for the last six years in Gaza over 300,000 poverty stricken people have been physically confined to an area the size of a large city park."

== See also ==
- Jordanian annexation of the West Bank
