= Amirav-Husseini peace meetings =

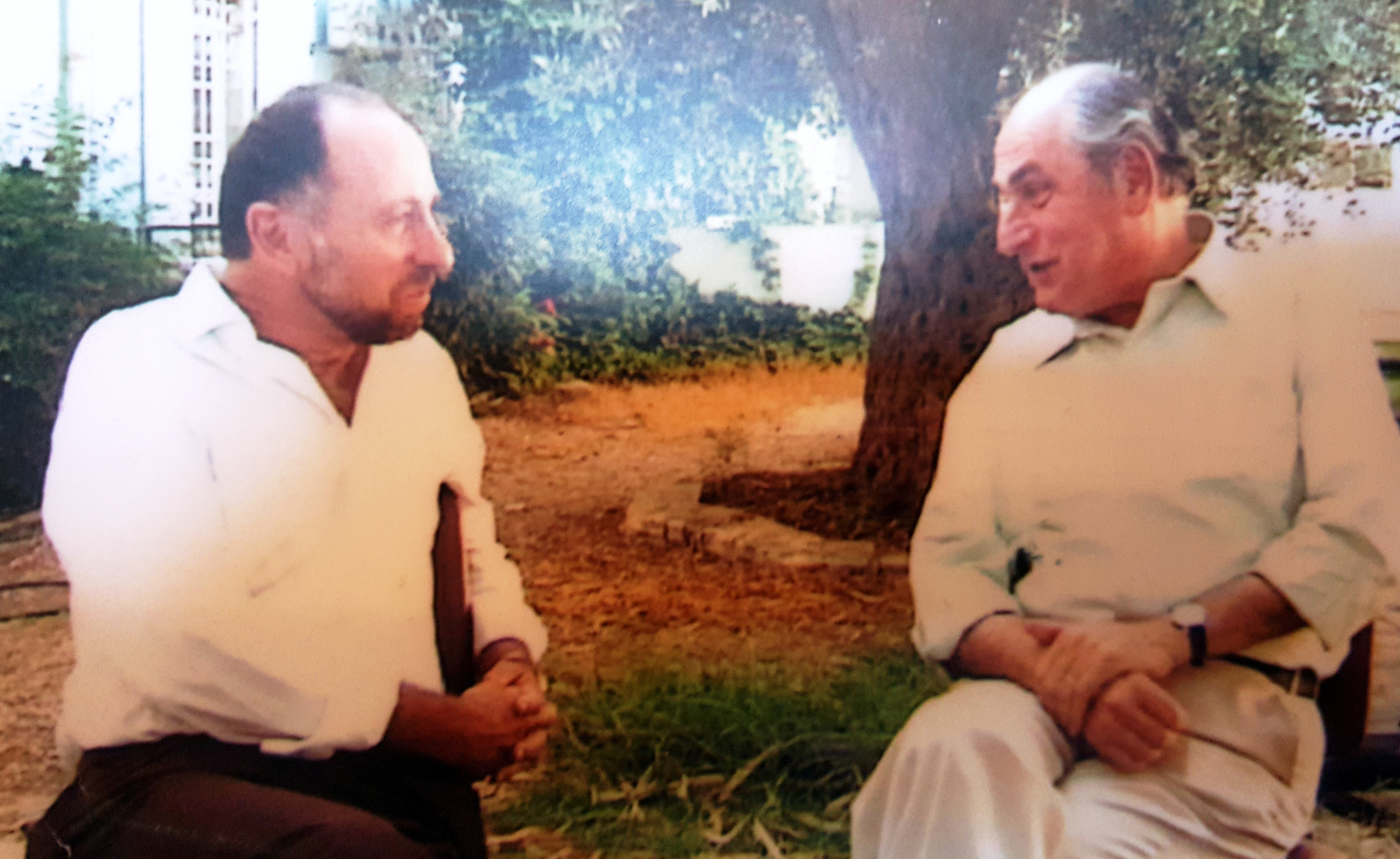
Moshe Amirav and Faisal Husseini.

The Amirav-Husseini peace meetings were a series of meetings led by well-connected Likud member Moshe Amirav and senior PLO member Faisal Husseini in mid-1987. During the meetings, Amirav and Husseini, as well as several other Palestinian and Israeli figures, discussed possible peace solutions to the Israeli-Palestinian conflict. The meetings ended in early September 1987, after Husseini was suddenly arrested by the Israeli military. Amirav was subsequently effectively forced out of Likud as a result of the meetings.

== Participants ==
=== Israelis ===
Moshe Amirav was a long-time Likud activist, as part of the Herut faction. He had previously as head of the Likud student wing, had served on the Likud central committee, and was known to be close to Israeli Prime Minister Yitzhak Shamir. He had also served in the Israeli military, including during the Six Day War in 1967, being wounded in the Battle for Jerusalem. According to Ahron Bregman and Jihan El-Tahri, Amirav turned towards supporting peace negotiations following his experience serving as a reservist in the 1982 Israeli invasion of Lebanon. Amirav was also known to be strongly opposed to the Jordanian option advocated for by the Israeli Labor Party, which proposed that the future of Palestine be as part of a federation with the Kingdom of Jordan, preferring instead Palestinian membership as equals within the Land of Israel.

David Ish Shalom was an Israeli peace activist. During the early and mid 1980s, Ish Shalom had participated in several peace dialogues with Palestinian figures in the occupied territories, forming personal friendships with several of them.

Ehud Olmert was a Likud MK.

=== Palestinians ===
Faisal Husseini was a Palestinian politician and high-ranking member of the PLO. In the 1950s, he had been a founding member of the General Union of Palestinian Students, subsequently joining the PLO when it was founded in the 1960s.

Salah Zuhaika was a Palestinian journalist.

Sari Nusseibeh was a Palestinian academic and member of the prominent Palestinian Nusaybah family. After earning a PhD in philosophy at Harvard University in the United States in the 1970s, he returned to Palestine to teach at Birzeit University.

== Meetings ==
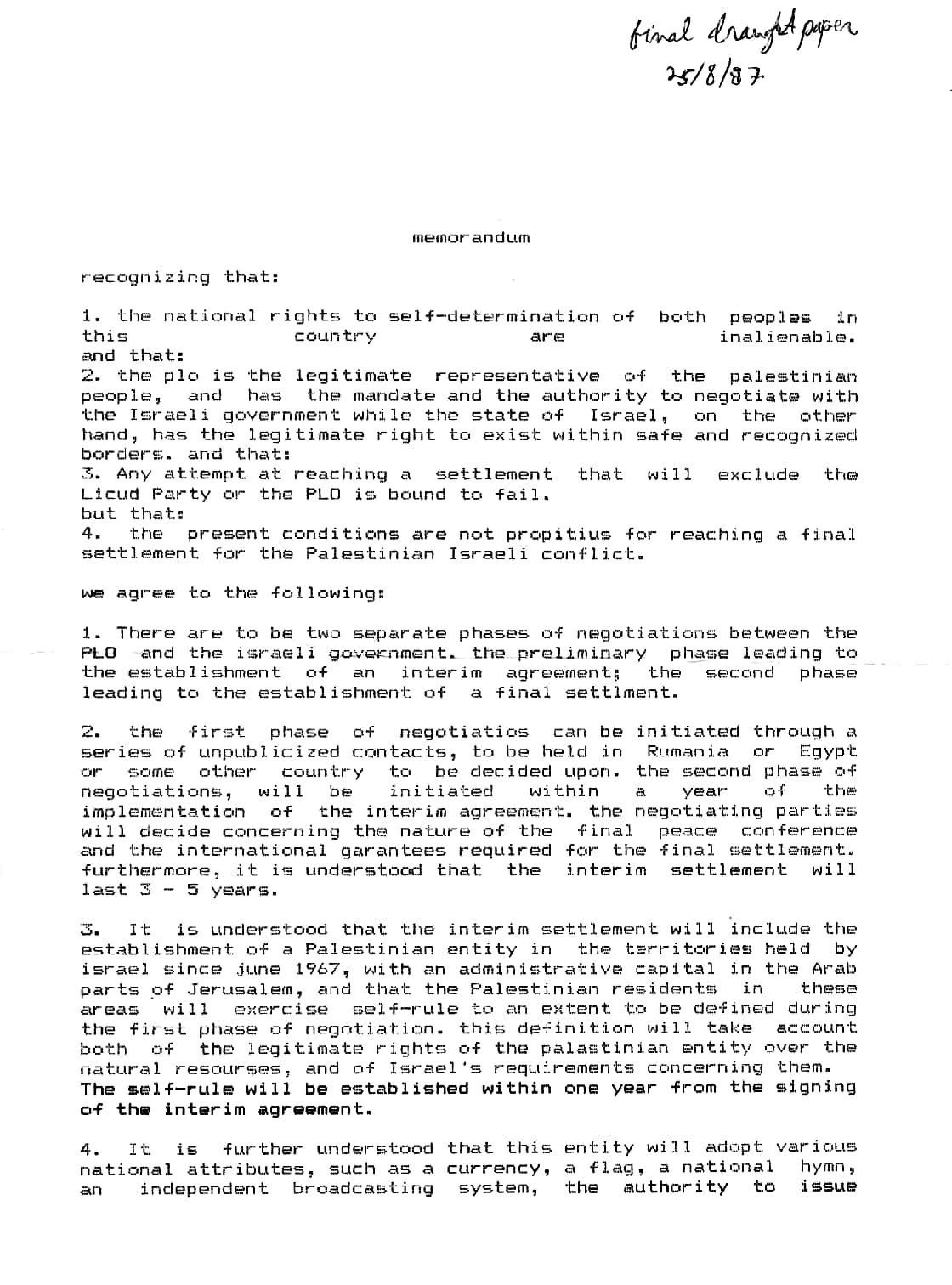

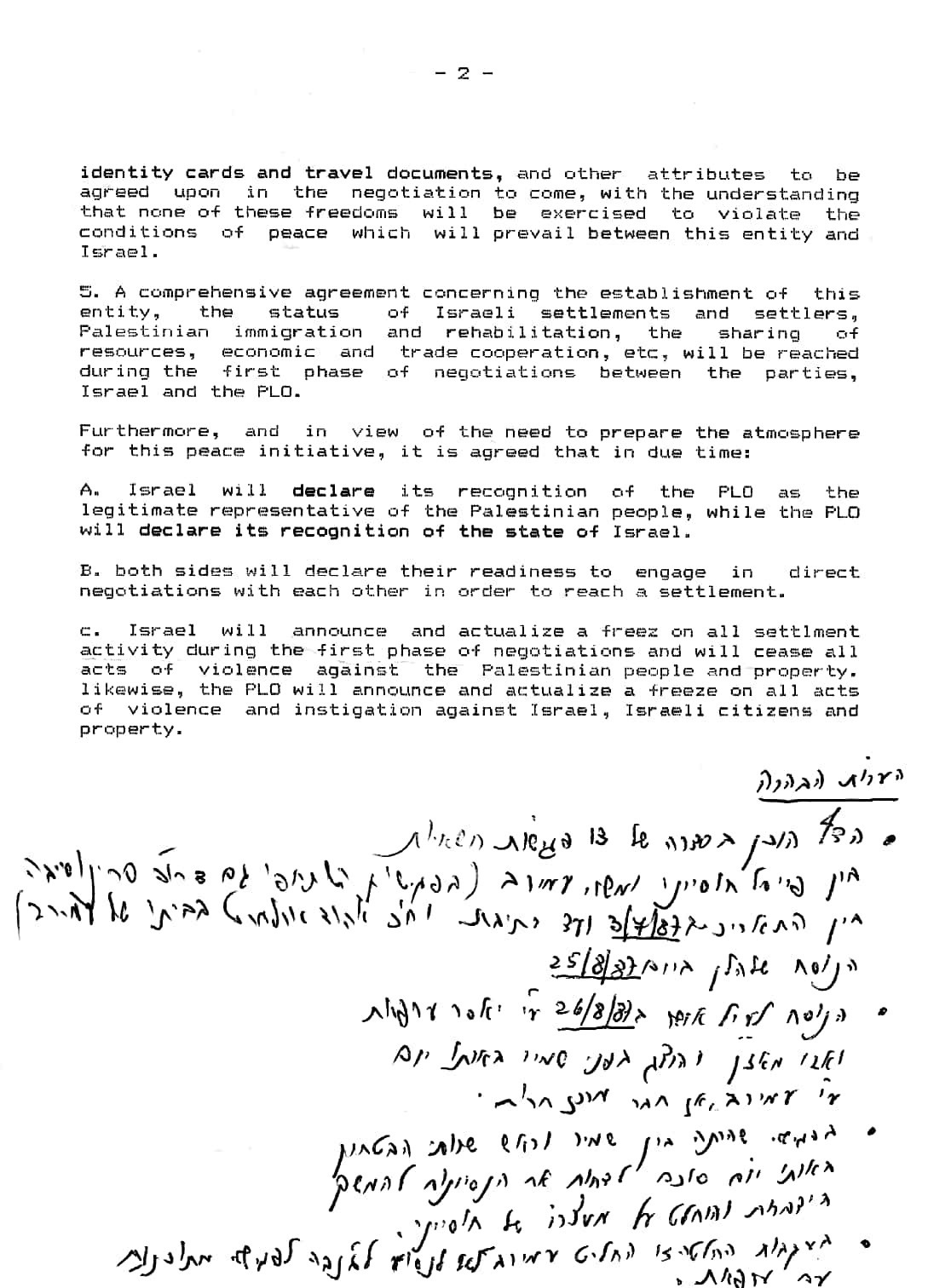

In mid 1987, Amirav was contacted by Ish-Shalom, who offered to put him in touch with Husseini and Nusseibeh. Amirav agreed.

On 4 July 1987, the first meeting was held between Amirav and Nusseibeh in a house in Jerusalem. In the meeting, the two agreed that Palestine and Israel would have to recognise each other's existence and autonomy and that peace negotiations would have to take place directly between Israelis and Palestinians. In the meeting, Amirav also proposed that the peace process should take part in two steps, first an autonomous interim Palestinian body, and second, a full-fledged Palestinian state. Nusseibeh indicated that he opposed a two-step process, but was willing to consider it and discuss it further. Husseini would join in the second meeting, and would receive approval from the PLO leadership exiled in Tunisia to represent them. During the meetings, Amirav strongly implied that the Likud leadership, including Prime Minister Yitzhak Shamir, were aware and supportive of the meetings.

On 30 July, Likud MK Ehud Olmert joined one of the meetings, on the condition that Husseini not be present that day due his role in the PLO. In the meeting, Olmert stated that he would be willing to support granting Palestine autonomy, but would be not be willing to support negotiations with or recognition of the PLO. Nuesseibeh, on the other hand, told Olmert that a deal would only be possible with the participation of the PLO and Yasser Arafat.

On 22 August, a key meeting was held at the Orient House in East Jerusalem, the de facto PLO headquarters in the city. At the meeting, the participants drafted a three-part memorandum of understanding. The first part consisted of a declaration of mutual recognition between the PLO and Israel, with both recognising the right to national self-determination for both Palestinians and Israelis. The second part outlined a process towards a final peace treaty, proposing an interim step where a transitional Palestinian government would be formed in the occupied territories with East Jerusalem as its capital. The third part proposed a number of immediate steps both sides of the conflict should take to de-escalate the conflict, including a freeze on Israeli settlements and a renunciation of violence by the PLO. The participants then arranged to travel to Geneva, Switzerland, to present the memorandum to PLO leader Yasser Arafat.

== Collapse ==
In early September 1987, Husseini was suddenly arrested by the Israeli military and placed under six months' administrative detention, with the charges against him being undisclosed. Husseini's arrest coincided with an Israeli air raid on Ain al-Hilweh, a Palestinian refugee camp in Lebanon. The raid, carried out by the Israeli Air Force, killed over 50 Palestinians. The arrest and raid immediately sparked suspicions among the participants of the meetings that the Israeli government was attempting to sabotage the peace initiative. Although Arafat signalled that he was willing to approve the memorandum and wished for the planned meeting in Geneva to take place, despite the suspicions, Amirav told the other participants that he was withdrawing from the initiative and that he had been directly ordered to do so by Shamir, who had been outraged when he learned about the meetings. Arafat subsequently met with Ish Shalom, as well as Hadash MK Charlie Biton, in Geneva. At the meeting, Arafat announced that he was no longer willing to sign on to the memorandum, saying that it was pointless to do so if the Israeli government had already rejected it, and if he couldn't even meet with an official representative of the Israeli government.

As the peace initiative had effectively collapsed, the participants decided to go public with the meetings. The reveal of the meetings was widely covered by both Israeli and Palestinian media and sparked significant controversy in Israeli politics. Israeli Prime Minister Yitzhak Shamir strongly denied any knowledge of the meetings and declared that he would never negotiate with the PLO. In a television interview, he stated that the affair was "an unimportant matter about a man who out of stupidity and naivete got embroiled with PLO men, without asking anybody... [Amirav] probably regrets his actions. If he doesn't today, he will tomorrow." Senior Likud MK Dan Meridor stated that Amirav's initiative "contradicts our entire platform," warning that "contacts with the PLO grant it legitimacy, especially with the Americans."

On 21 September, Nusseibeh was accosted by a group of four masked men on the Birzeit campus and physically assaulted. Members of the Popular Front for the Liberation of Palestine student bloc at the university had previously distributed leaflets denouncing him for the meetings. The attack was condemned by the Fatah student bloc at Birzeit, the university administration, multiple Palestinian newspapers, and senior PLO member Khalil al-Wazir.

Amirav was subsequently placed under internal investigation by Likud. As a result of the investigation, Amirav was pressured into writing a letter of apology to the party and was banned from holding any posts within the party, although was not outright expelled from the party. In January 1988, Amirav resigned his party membership, declaring that the party was moving towards "an ideological bunker with Geula Cohen and Rabbi Meir Kahane’s Kach movement."

In February 1988, David Ish Shalom planned to take part in the Al Awda journey, where over one hundred Palestinians deported by Israel would be ferried from Cyprus to Haifa, mimicking the 1947 SS Exodus journey. The ship, however, was bombed and was unable to depart Cyprus. Ish Shalom was subsequently arrested by Israeli police and charged with having held several meetings with PLO officials in 1987 and 1988, ultimately being sentenced to seven-months incarceration.

== Analysis ==
Lior Lehrs of the Hebrew University of Jerusalem wrote in 2020 that the meetings were ultimately "a story of failure," saying that Shamir's opposition to peace negotiations with Palestinians presented an unsurmountable obstacle, that in mid-1987 the Israeli public, military, and politicians still believed that the status quo of the occupation was stable, that there was a widespread consensus in Israel against opening negotiations directly with Palestinians, that the PLO was heavily internally divided and feared that explicit acceptance of a two-state solution would cause it to permanently split, and that Amirav had acted without any real support from the Likud leadership, despite his claims to the contrary during the meetings. Israeli historian Mordechai Bar-On argued in 1996 that "Amirav's good intentions were undermined, perhaps, by his political naiveté... Although he was frequently invited by the Israeli left to participate in conferences and dialogues and briefly held formal positions within the peace movement, and although he was able to increase his contacts with Palestinians in the years that followed, Amirav was unable to consolidate his early successes and remained a loner without a significant constituency."

Israeli historian Benny Morris argued in October 1987 that the meetings represented the transformation of Likud into a "supermarket" of ideas about how to resolve the Israeli-Palestinian conflict, from the more monolithic party under Menachem Begin in the 1970s. Morris identified several tendencies within Likud: members who believed the conflict could be solved via the transfer of Palestinians out of the occupied territories, members who believed in Palestine becoming part of the Jordanian state, members who believed in a semi-autonomous Palestinian government uner Israeli sovereignty, a small minority (including Amirav) who believed in negotiating a solution with the PLO, and members (centred around Shamir) who believed that the status quo could be continued indefinitely.

Ish Shalom has argued that the collapse of the meetings was an instigating factor in the outbreak of the First Intifada in December 1987, saying that "I assume that the disappointment and frustration from the unsigned agreement was one of the factors that led to the outbreak of the intifada." Amirav would echo the argument, saying in 2018 that "the failure of this opportunity to open a peace venue for the Palestinians instigated the frustration that led them into the intifada that changed the Middle East from that moment on."
