= Lana Nusseibeh =

Emirati diplomat (born 1978)

- لانا زكي نسيبه
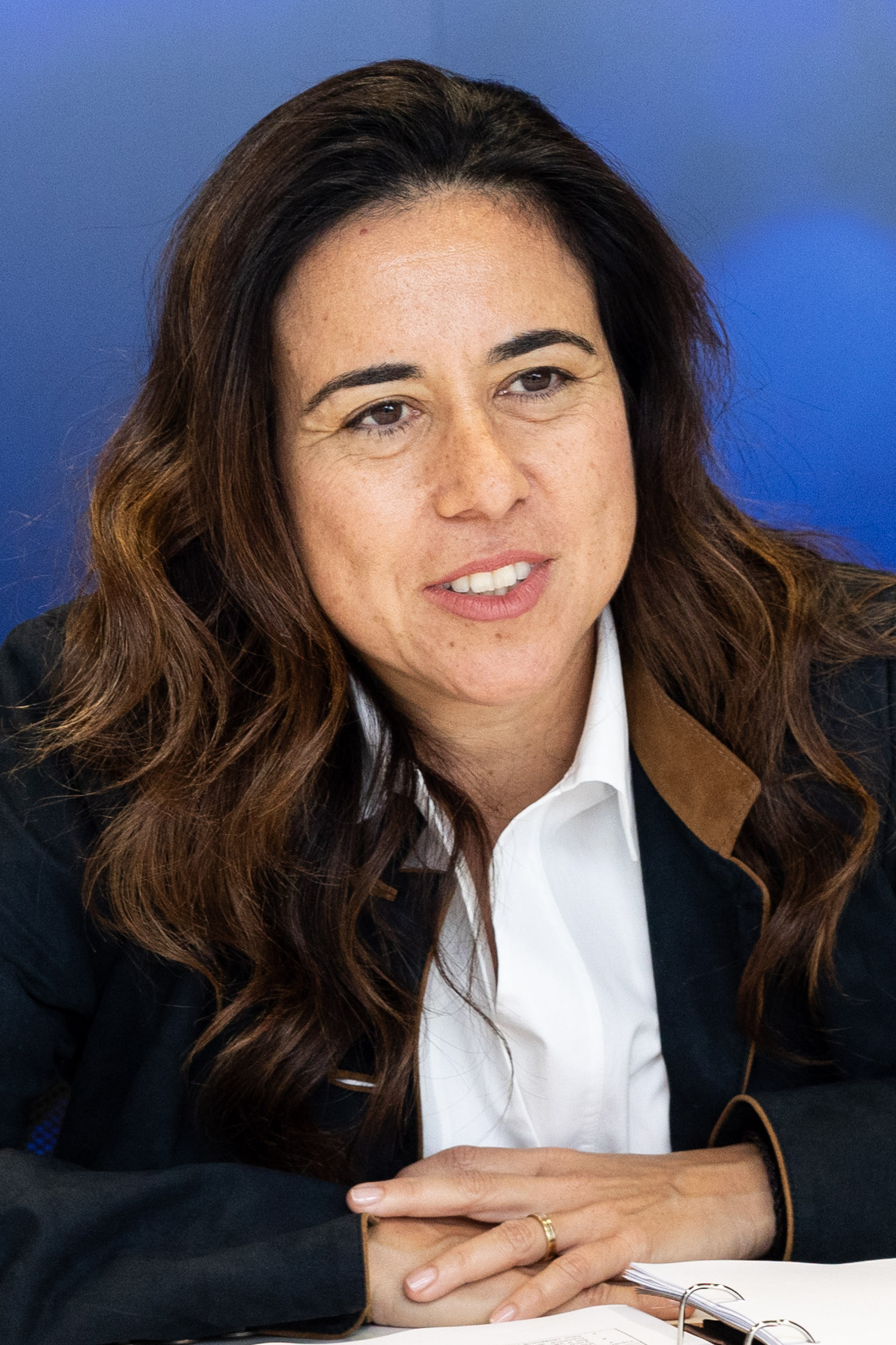
- Nusseibeh in 2024

Minister of State at the Ministry of Foreign Affairs and Envoy of the Minister of Foreign Affairs
- Incumbent
- Assumed office September 2025
- Appointed by: Mohamed bin Zayed Al Nahyan

Permanent Representative of the United Arab Emirates to the United Nations
- In office September 2013 – April 2024
- Appointed by: Khalifa bin Zayed Al Nahyan
- Preceded by: Ahmed Al-Jarman
- Succeeded by: Mohamed Issa Abushahab

Personal details
- Born: Lana Zaki Nusseibeh; 1978 (age 47–48) Abu Dhabi, United Arab Emirates
- Relations: Anwar Nusseibeh (grandfather); Nuzha Al-Ghussein (grandmother)
- Parent: Zaki Nusseibeh (father)
- Education: University of Cambridge (BA, MA); SOAS University of London (MA)
- Occupation: Diplomat and government minister

Lana Zaki Nusseibeh (Arabic: لانا زكي نسيبه) (born 1978) is an Emirati diplomat who most recently served as Minister of State at the Ministry of Foreign Affairs and Envoy of the Minister of Foreign Affairs of the United Arab Emirates. She previously served as the United Arab Emirates Permanent Representative to the United Nations from September 2013 to April 2024.

== Early life and education ==
Nusseibeh was born in 1978 in Abu Dhabi in the United Arab Emirates. She is the daughter of Zaki Nusseibeh, who was born in 1946 in Jerusalem, Mandatory Palestine, was educated in England, and moved to Abu Dhabi in 1967, becoming an independent journalist and subsequently a government official of the United Arab Emirates. The granddaughter of Anwar Nusseibeh and Nuzha Nuseibeh, she is descended from the Nusseibeh family of Jerusalem.

She attended The British School – Al Khubairat in Abu Dhabi for her early schooling. She subsequently moved to the UK and attended Wycombe Abbey, a private girls' boarding school in Buckinghamshire, England, from 1990 to 1997.

She received bachelor's and master's degrees in history from Queens' College, University of Cambridge. In 2003, she obtained an additional master's degree, in Israeli and Jewish diaspora studies, from the School of Oriental and African Studies of the University of London.

She speaks English, Arabic, French, and Hebrew.

== Career ==
=== Early career ===
Nusseibeh was a consultant for UNESCO in Paris from 2000 to 2001, and an analyst with the Security and Terrorism Programme of the Gulf Research Center from 2004 to 2006.

She entered UAE government service in 2006, when she was appointed Director of Research and Communications at the UAE Ministry of State for Federal National Council Affairs, where she advised the Minister of State on key policy issues including labor, human rights, human trafficking, education, and women's empowerment and political participation. She also played a leading role in preparing and organizing the UAE's first national elections, focusing on mobilising women voters. In 2008, she led the UAE's diplomatic campaign to secure Abu Dhabi as the headquarters of the International Renewable Energy Agency (IRENA).

In 2009, she established and directed the Policy Planning Department in the UAE's Ministry of Foreign Affairs, where she provided strategic guidance to UAE leadership on the rapid changes in regional politics. From 2010 through 2011, she also served as the UAE co-special envoy to Afghanistan and Pakistan. She was also Deputy Sherpa for the UAE's participation in the G20, and a member of the UK-UAE Ministerial Taskforce.

=== UAE Ambassador and Permanent Representative to the UN ===
Nusseibeh was appointed UAE Ambassador and Permanent Representative to the UN by President Khalifa bin Zayed Al Nahyan in September 2013. She was the first woman in the position.

From 2015 onward, she co-chaired the Friends of the Future of the UN, an unofficial forum for discussing the most pressing issues affecting the UN's future. In 2015 she was appointed co-facilitator of the UN's ten-year review of the World Summit on the Information Society.

In 2016 and 2017 she was co-chair of the Ad Hoc Working Group on the Revitalization of the Work of the UN General Assembly. In 2017 she was President of the UN Women Executive Board. She was elected as one of the Vice Presidents for the 72nd session of the United Nations General Assembly in 2017, representing the Asia-Pacific group of member states.

From 2017 through 2019, in three consecutive appointments, Nusseibeh was co-chair of the Intergovernmental Negotiations on UN Security Council Reform, leading and guiding discussions on reform of the UN Security Council.

Nusseibeh successfully led the UAE's campaign for election to the UN Security Council. During the UAE's membership of the Security Council from 2022 through 2023, Nusseibeh led the country's delegation and twice served as President of the Security Council, in March 2022 and June 2023.

=== Government minister in the UAE ===
Nusseibeh concluded her tenure as UAE Ambassador and Permanent Representative to the UN in April 2024, and returned to Abu Dhabi to continue to serve as UAE Assistant Minister for Political Affairs, a position she had held since February 2021, providing strategic direction as well as the UAE's diplomatic engagement across all geographies. She also remained the UAE's Envoy of the Minister of Foreign Affairs. As the Foreign Minister's Envoy to the European Union, she oversaw the launch of negotiations for agreements with the EU on free trade and on the broader UAE-EU strategic partnership.

In September 2025, she was appointed a Minister of State of the UAE, making her Minister of State at the Ministry of Foreign Affairs. She advanced key priorities across nearly 50 bilateral partnerships in continental Europe.

On October 21, 2026, Nusseibeh took a leave of absence from her government posts after being nominated as a candidate for UN Secretary-General.

=== Candidate for United Nations Secretary-General ===
In October 2026, President Mohamed bin Zayed Al Nahyan formally nominated Nusseibeh as a candidate in the 2026 United Nations Secretary-General selection to succeed António Guterres. At the time, the race was deadlocked after all seven candidates received at least two red "no" votes by permanent members of the UN Security Council. The nomination of Nusseibeh was criticized by human rights activists because of the United Arab Emirates' involvement in the Sudanese civil war.

== Memberships ==
Nusseibeh is a member of the Advisory Board of the London School of Economics Middle East Centre.

She is on the Board of Advisors of the School of Advanced International Studies at Johns Hopkins University.

She is on the Board of Trustees of the Anwar Gargash Diplomatic Academy.

== Awards and honours ==
- UAE Prime Minister's Government Excellence Award, also known as the UAE Medal of Pride (2017)
- National Order of Merit "Don José Falcón" awarded by the Government of Paraguay in recognition of her contribution to the provision of emergency relief during the Covid-19 pandemic (2022)
- The Shield of Palestine, awarded by the Permanent Representative of Palestine in recognition of her work at the UN (2024)

== Publications ==
- Al Dabbagh, May; Nusseibeh, Lana (2009). "Women in Parliament and Politics in the UAE". Women, Leadership and Development in the Middle East: 367.

== Personal life ==
Nusseibeh is married and has two children.
