= Hazem Nuseibeh =

Palestinian-Jordanian diplomat and politician (1922–2022)

- حازم نسيبة
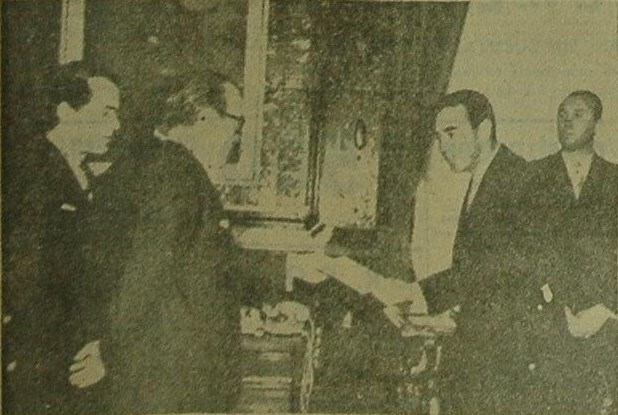

Minister of Foreign Affairs of Jordan
- In office January 1962 – April 1963, 1965
- Monarch: Hussein of Jordan
- Prime Minister: Wasfi al-Tal

Minister of the Hashemite Royal Court
- In office 1963–?
- Monarch: Hussein of Jordan

Minister of Reconstruction and Development of Jordan
- In office 1967–1968
- Monarch: Hussein of Jordan
- Prime Minister: Bahjat Talhouni

Ambassador to Egypt
- In office 1968–1971

Ambassador to Turkey
- In office 1971–1972

Ambassador to Italy, Ambassador to Switzerland and Ambassador to Austria
- In office 1972–1974

Permanent Representative of Jordan to the United Nations
- In office 1976–1985

Personal details
- Born: 6 May 1922 Jerusalem, Mandatory Palestine
- Died: 10 April 2022 (aged 99)
- Citizenship: Jordan
- Party: Independent
- Spouse: Qadar Masri Nuseibeh
- Children: 4
- Education: American University of Beirut, Princeton University

Hazem Zaki Nuseibeh (Arabic: حازم نسيبة; 6 May 1922 – 10 April 2022), also spelled Nusseibeh and Nusaybah, was a Jordanian politician and diplomat of Palestinian descent. He was a member of the old Nusaybah family. During his career for the Jordanian administration he served amongst other positions as Minister of Foreign Relations, Ambassador to Egypt, and Permanent Representative to the United Nations. He is also seen as having been one of the most important ideologists of Arab nationalism.

== Early years ==
Nuseibeh was born in 1922 in Jerusalem, Mandatory Palestine. For his secondary education he went to Victoria College, Alexandria, Egypt between 1936 and 1940. He started his university studies at the American University of Beirut, completing a BA in Political Science in 1943. Afterwards, he returned to Jerusalem to study law between 1943 and 1948. During this time Nuseibeh became a broadcaster and chief news editor of the Palestine Broadcasting Service, where he reported about the Deir Yassin massacre. His studies carried him abroad once more when he went to study at Woodrow Wilson School of Public and International Affairs at Princeton University in New Jersey, United States. There he earned a Master of Public Affairs in 1952. At the Politics Department of Princeton he earned a further MA in 1953 and his PhD in 1954.

== Diplomatic career ==
=== Minister ===
In 1958 Nuseibeh was to be appointed under-Secretary of Foreign Affairs of the Arab Federation, a union of Jordan and Iraq. However, the 14 July Revolution brought down the ruling family in Iraq several days before Nuseibeh's appointment, and the union disbanded. At one point in time thereafter Nuseibeh served as the Jordanian representative in the Jordan–Israel Mixed Armistice Commission. During the 1950s and 1960s the Nusaybah family became more influential in the Jordanian Government, as Hazem's brother Anwar Nusseibeh was appointed governor and custodian of the sanctuaries in the West Bank, including the Church of the Holy Sepulchre in Jerusalem, and at times was Minister of Defence. Hazem Nuseibeh himself later served as Foreign Affairs Minister between January 1962 and April 1963 and once more in 1965, although other sources mention that he served continuously between 1962 and 1966. In February 1965 Jordanian Prime Minister, Wasfi al-Tal, presented a White Paper designed to improve the relationship between Jordanians and Palestinians, which had been troublesome for the last couple of years under King Hussein of Jordan. The White Paper was mainly drafted by Nuseibeh and it called for the establishment of a United Kingdom of Palestine and Jordan. The plan gave the West Bank limited autonomy from the state of Jordan and allowed for the election of Palestinians. With the plan Nusseibeh hoped to make the Palestinians in the state of Jordan feel more included. Prime Minister Wasfi al-Tal voted against the plan as he feared it would create more friction between the Palestinians and Jordanians. The plan also received criticism from Egyptian president Gamal Abdel Nasser, who wished to take the Palestinians under his pan-Arab umbrella. Later, Nuseibeh came to regret that his White Plan was not implemented, as he felt that the Palestine Liberation Organization could gain prominence because it could call itself the only representative of the Palestinian people. In 1963 Nuseibeh also became Minister of the Hashemite Royal Court and Political Adviser to Hussein of Jordan. This was followed by a term as Minister of Reconstruction and Development between 1967 and 1968.

=== Ambassador and Permanent Representative ===
After these terms as minister, Nuseibeh became an ambassador of Jordan, serving in several high-profile posts. His first assignment was Egypt, where he served from 1968 to 1971. He continued as ambassador in Turkey, being stationed there between 1971 and 1972. He left the Middle East for Europe in 1972 to become ambassador to Italy, Switzerland and Austria, serving until 1974. Nuseibeh changed continents once again when he became the Permanent Representative of Jordan at the United Nations in New York, United States in 1976. During his time as Permanent Representative he on numerous occasions fell out with the Israeli Representative Yehuda Zvi Blum. In December 1980 Nuseibeh partially based a speech on the Protocols of the Elders of Zion, an anti-semitic hoax purporting to describe a Jewish plan for global domination. For the speech he received severe criticism from Blum. Early in 1982 they fell out over the position of Palestinians in Jordan and Israel. Blum wished to point out that Palestinians already had a home in Jordan and referred to the country as "the Palestinian Arab State of Jordan", while Nuseibeh responded by calling Israel "the Israeli entity". During the discussion of the 1982 invasion of the Falkland Islands in the United Nations Security Council, Nuseibeh assured the Argentinian Representative, Eduardo Roca, that Jordan would vote against the United Kingdom. However, after a conversation between Nuseibeh and United Kingdom Representative, Anthony Parsons, the Jordanian vote would later be in favor of the United Kingdom in United Nations Security Council Resolution 502. Nuseibeh served as President of the United Nations Security Council in October 1982 and he retired as Permanent Representative in 1985.

== Political career and retirement ==
After his retirement from the diplomatic service he was member of the Senate of Jordan between either 1982 or 1985 and 1989. And during 1986 he served as a Government Minister and was seen as a prominent moderate in the discussion about Palestinians. In 1989 he retired altogether from public service. He did however teach Arab and International Affairs at the University of Jordan and the national War College. In the 2009 published book, Jerusalemites: a living memory, were his personal memoirs. Nuseibeh said on his family's website that he dedicated his time to farming.

On Nuseibeh's 90th birthday, on 6 May 2012, a banquet was hosted by Prince Hassan bin Talal of Jordan for Nuseibeh's achievements in Jordanian society.

== Personal life ==
During his youth, Nuseibeh managed to win several national and international tournaments in tennis.

Nuseibeh was married to Qadar Masri Nuseibeh and had four children; sons Haitham and Khaled, and daughters Laila and Lina. He died on 10 April 2022, at the age of 99.

== Honour ==
=== Foreign honour ===
- Malaysia:
  - Honorary Commander of the Order of the Defender of the Realm (PMN (K)) - Tan Sri (1965)

== Works and publications ==
- The ideas of Arab nationalism (1954)
- Palestine and the United Nations (1972)
- Jerusalemites : a living memory (2009)

== See also ==
- Nusaybah family

Diplomatic posts
Preceded by Masahiro Nisibori	President of the United Nations Security Council; October 1982	Succeeded by Carlos Ozores
