= Nusaybah =

Nusaybah can refer to:

- Nusaybah bint Ka'ab, a female disciple of Muhammad, warrior of Islam, and a powerful figure in Medinah before Islam, being involved in handing over power to Muhammad when she heard his call
- The Nusaybah family, descended from Nusaybah bint Ka'ab, who have since the arrival of Islam in Jerusalem been obliged under an agreement to hold the keys of the Church of the Holy Sepulchre and open its doors as a neutral party to avoid conflict between the various Christian denominations
