= Anwar Nuseibeh =

Jordanian politician (1913–1986)

- أنور نسيبة
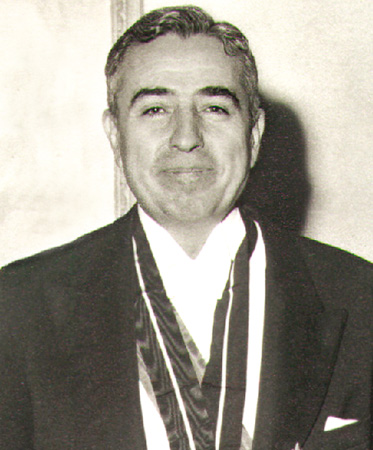

Minister of Defense
- In office 24 October 1954 – 28 May 1955

Minister of Defense, Minister of Education
- In office 4 May 1954 – 21 October 1954

Minister of Defense, Minister of Construction and Building
- In office 7 October 1952 – 5 May 1953

Minister of Construction and Building
- In office 30 September 1952 – 7 October 1952

Personal details
- Born: 1913 Jerusalem, Mutassarifate of Jerusalem, Ottoman Empire
- Died: 1986 (aged 72–73) Jerusalem
- Spouse: Nuzha Al-Ghussein (m. 1942)
- Children: Sari Nusseibeh; Zaki Nusseibeh; Munira Nusseibeh; Saida Nusseibeh; Hatem Nusseibeh; Saqr Nusseibeh
- Relatives: Hazem Nuseibeh (brother)
- Education: The Perse School
- Alma mater: Queens' College, Cambridge

Anwar Bey Nuseibeh (Arabic: أنور نسيبة) (1913–1986) was a leading Palestinian who held several major posts in the Jordanian Government before Israel took control of East Jerusalem and the West Bank in the 1967 war. After the Six Day War he became one of the first Palestinians involved in contacts with Israel after it captured the Eastern part of the city and later encouraged his son, Sari Nusseibeh, to make contact with the Israelis.

== Early life ==
=== Ancestry ===
Nuseibeh was from an aristocratic Arab family descended from the female chieftain Nusaybah bint Ka'ab, an early convert to Islam who defended Muhammed during the Battle of Uhud in 625. The Neuseibeh family were guardians of the Church of the Holy Sepulchre, whose keys had been entrusted to the Nuseibeh family by Saladin in 1192.

=== Birth and education ===
Nuseibeh was born in Jerusalem. He completed his primary education at the Rawdat al-Ma‘arif al-Wataniyya School and his secondary education at the Arab College in Jerusalem. He was educated at The Perse School in Cambridge, becoming the first Palestinian Arab to be sent to an English public school. He then went to Queens' College, Cambridge, where he studied law. He was a keen sportsman who captained the Cambridge tennis team, an accomplished horseman and a talented pianist. After Cambridge he went on to Gray's Inn where he was called to the bar. During his time at Queens', he was a contemporary of Abba Eban, who would later be Foreign Affairs Minister of Israel during the Six-Day War.

== Political career ==
Nuseibeh started working for the British administration of Palestine in 1936, first as Land Officer, and then as a magistrate in Nazareth and then Jaffa. At the same time, he worked with his father in law, Yaqub al-Ghusayn, in the anti-British nationalist movement, often helping in clandestine operations to source weapons for the Palestinian nationalist rebels. In 1939 he supported the Malcolm MacDonald White Paper which essentially called for the creation of a single democratic state for all citizens in Palestine irrespective of race. This was rejected by the Zionist movement as it limited Jewish immigration during increased demand because of the Nazis. In 1945, he went to London at the behest of Abd al-Rahman Pasha Azzam, an Egyptian statesman who was a friend of Yaqub al-Ghusayn and founder of the Arab League, to head the Arab Office there. This was seen as a counter-move to the Mufti's move to Berlin.

=== 1948 Arab–Israeli War and All-Palestine Government ===
In 1947 he was appointed Secretary to the Arab National Committee and was responsible for co-ordinating the Arab defence of Jerusalem when the 1948 Palestine War broke out. Nuseibeh lost his leg fighting the Israeli forces in 1948 on his return with his convoy from a failed mission to convince Abdullah I of Jordan, then at Shuna in Jordan, to lend a single piece of artillery to hold the valley approach to Jerusalem against the advance by Israeli militias. After a brief period recuperating in Beirut, he returned to Palestine to become Secretary to the Cabinet of the Government of all Palestine in Gaza. After 1948, he led the Arab delegation to discuss the terms of the armistice and the ceasefire line with the newly founded Israeli government. He originally opposed the Jericho Conference, which was favoured by his brother Hazem, but accepted the will of the majority and returned to Jerusalem to serve in the Jordanian government.

=== Jordanian minister and diplomat ===
Nuseibeh held a number of cabinet posts in the Jordanian government, including Defence, Interior and Education, and stood for Parliament as well as serving in the Senate. By the late 1950s he had moved away from the government in Amman as he gave up on convincing the young King Hussein to accept parliamentary democracy. In 1961, he became governor of Jerusalem but was dismissed after he refused to allow a US Senator to cross the Mandelbaum check point from Israel into Jerusalem on the basis that such an act would be a de facto admission that the border was legal, as opposed to simply a cease fire line. He was dismissed by the King which led to riots in Jerusalem in his support. In 1965, he became the Jordanian Ambassador to the Court of St. James. During his time as an ambassador in London, Nuseibeh established a warm relationship with members of the British royal family.

=== Return to Jerusalem ===
He returned to Jerusalem just before the 1967 war (technically abandoning his post) and continued to live there under occupation. In 1970, he fell out with the PLO because he thought their war with the Jordanian authorities was ill-conceived and dishonorable (since they were effectively 'guests' in Jordan). In 1974 he moved further from the Palestinian nationalist cause when he opposed the Rabat Conference for two reasons. First, he believed that King Hussein and President Nasser had a moral duty to the Palestinians to restore the 1967 borders, because it was lost 'on their watch'. Secondly, he believed that making the PLO the 'sole representative of the Palestinian people' was merely a precursor to their accepting the legality of the State of Israel, which he never did. That is why he was adamant that the first step was always UN resolution 242, then a discussion of democratic principles as the only moral solution to the problem. He always held the view that his implacable refusal to accept the legality of the State of Israel did not preclude conversation with a people he viewed as fellow Arabs with a different religion, and so became one of the first Palestinians involved in contacts with Israel after it captured the Arab sector of the city. His final act of public service was taking on the post of Chairman of the East Jerusalem Electric company, which had become the center for a tug of war over the legality of Israeli occupation of East Jerusalem. It is notable that at the death of this essentially patrician Arab, his large funeral was led by the socialist labour unions.

During his life, he filled the following positions:

- Land Officer of Jerusalem, 1936.
- Magistrate Nazareth, then Jafa.
- Head of Arab Offices London 1945.
- Secretary to the Arab National Committee 1947–48 (Coordinating Defense of Jerusalem).
- Cabinet Secretary of the All-Palestine Government, formed by Amin al-Husseini in Gaza, September–October 1948.
- Elected in 1950 as a Palestinian representative to the lower house (Chamber of Deputies) of the Parliament of Jordan.
- Appointed in September 1952, as the Jordanian Cabinet (Minister of Defense, later Minister of Development and Reconstruction, later and Minister of Interior and finally of Education).
- Appointed in 1963, to the Upper House (Senate).
- Appointed as the Governor of Jerusalem, 1961.
- Appointed as the Ambassador to the United Kingdom 1965–67.
- Legal Council to the UNRWA 1967–1979.
- Appointed as Executive chairman to the East Jerusalem Electric Company 1979–86.

== Death ==
Nuseibeh died of cancer on 22 November 1986 at his home in Jerusalem at the age of 74. He was buried at the gates of the Noble Sanctuary within the confines of Haram as-Sharif Al-Aqsa. His funeral was attended by thousands of people.

== Political views ==
Nuseibeh was an Arab nationalist who believed in parliamentary democracy and in maintaining Arab consensus, on the grounds that Arab unity was more important than individual differences. He also believed in accepting the will of the majority, hence his participation in Jordanian politics following the Jericho Conference of 1948. He believed that holding fast to one's principles does not preclude one from dialogue with the other, hence his reputation for openness and accessibility. He always maintained that the Jews, as Semites, were Arabs and had all the rights due to Arabs throughout the Arab world. Before 1947 several Jewish lawyers took their articles in his offices. This belief led to his support for a single state solution for Palestine in 1939, his opposition to the fascist dogmas in Europe in the 1930s and later as postulated by the Ba'ath movement. When invited to become a founding member by Michel Aflaq, he declined in a telegram with a single line of 'I have always opposed Nazism'. He also opposed the expelling of Jews from Arab states post 1947.

== See also ==
- Nusaybah (disambiguation)
