= Sudan–United Arab Emirates relations =

- Sudan: United Arab Emirates

Sudan–United Arab Emirates relations refer to the current and historical relationship between Sudan and the United Arab Emirates.

== Historical relations ==
Sudanese-Emirati relations date back to the early 1970s, when the Republic of Sudan was one of the first countries with which the UAE established diplomatic relations. During the presidency of Jaafar Nimeiri, the two nations signed several agreements in the fields of economy, technical cooperation, and cultural exchange. The UAE provided loans and assistance for vital Sudanese infrastructure projects, including roads, railways, and factories.

In 1981 the UAE signed an agreement with Sudan, allowing their workers to operate in the UAE.

Over time, economic and developmental cooperation expanded, with the UAE contributing significantly to the Merowe Dam project. Relations also extended to sectors like air transport, oil, mining, and manufacturing, with Emirati investors entering these fields. Sudan and the UAE continued their collaboration through various agreements, fostering close ties throughout different Sudanese governments.

== Political relations ==
In 2009, the UAE helped Sudan politically by mediating a border dispute with Chad.

Sudan shifted its foreign policy in 2014 by closing Iranian cultural centers, in alignment with the Gulf nations.

=== Post Al-Bashir ===
Following the removal of Sudanese President Omar Al-Bashir in April 2019, the UAE supported his ousting. Al-Bashir rejected a UAE-backed resolution for the Sudanese revolution that would have allowed him to stay in power for a transitional period after which would be followed by elections. After the fall of Al Bashir government, UAE supported the military led council led by Abdel Fattah al-Burhan and Mohamed 'Hemdeti' Hamdan Dagalo. When Sudanese Prime Minister Abdalla Hamdok was detained following the 2021 Sudanese coup d'état, UAE persuaded the military to release him.

Political ties deepened in the 2020s. In April 2021, Sudan's Foreign Minister, Dr. Maryam Al-Sadiq Al-Mahdi, met with Abu Dhabi Fund for Development Director-General Mohammed Saif Al Suwaidi to discuss strengthening bilateral cooperation. On 31 August 2021, Sudan and the UAE launched a strategic partnership in government modernization to enhance cooperation and knowledge exchange. Sudanese Prime Minister Abdalla Hamdok and UAE Minister Ohood Al Roumi held bilateral meetings, with the emphasis on Sudan’s return to the international community.

In December 2022, UAE signed a deal with the Sudanese Transitional Sovereignty Council to build a new $6 billion port on the Red Sea north of Port Sudan.

Deputy chair of the Sudanese Transitional Sovereignty Council Mohamed Hamdan Dagalo visited Abu Dhabi in 2022 to offer condolences on the death of Sheikh Khalifa bin Zayed Al Nahyan. Sudanese Transitional Sovereignty Council and general of the Sudanese Armed Forces Abdel Fattah Al Burhan also visited Abu Dhabi in February 2023 and met Sheikh Mohamed bin Zayed Al Nahyan.

=== Sudanese civil war (2023–present) ===
The UAE has allegedly backed and armed the Rapid Support Forces according to a UN report. The UAE denies the allegations and consistently calls for a de-escalation and diplomatic resolution to the civil war. Diplomatic tensions between Sudan and the UAE escalated in September 2024 when the Sudanese military denied accusations of bombing the UAE ambassador's residence in Khartoum, instead blaming the RSF. The UAE condemned the attack as a violation of diplomatic immunity, prompting the Sudanese military to accuse the UAE of supporting the RSF. That same month, a UAE delegation led by Lana Nusseibeh visited Chad to assess refugee conditions and meet Sudanese civil society leaders.

In December 2024, the US labeled both warring parties in Sudan as perpetrators of war crimes. Turkish President Recep Tayyip Erdogan also offered to mediate the dispute between Sudan and the UAE. The UAE Ministry of Foreign Affairs released a statement and welcomed Turkish mediation efforts in Sudan conflict.

On 6 March 2025, Sudan filed a case against the UAE at the International Court of Justice, accusing the UAE of complicity in genocide by supporting the Rapid Support Forces, which are alleged to have committed atrocities against the Masalit people in Darfur. The UAE rejected these allegations, calling the case a publicity stunt. Sudan brought their case against the UAE before the International Court of Justice in April, accusing it of violating the Genocide Convention by arming the RSF. The UAE denied the claims, dismissed the case as politically motivated, and challenged the court’s jurisdiction. On 5 May 2025 the ICJ threw out the case, stating that it "manifestly lacked" authority to rule on the case. On 6 May 2025 the Sudan's army-aligned government announced that it had cut diplomatic ties with the UAE. The UAE stated it didn't recognize a decision by Sudan's army-affiliated defence council to sever ties.

== Economic relations ==
=== Trade growth in the 2000s ===
In 2003, a free-trade zone was established, and UAE investments in Sudan's agriculture sector were seen as crucial for food security.

In 2008, The UAE was the second-largest investor in Sudan, with $7 billion in investments. Bilateral trade increased by over 30% annually, with Dubai accounting for 90% of trade. Sudan’s rapid economic growth, driven by oil and foreign investment, saw a real GDP growth of 12.8% in 2007. In 2009, the UAE also helped balance Sudan’s budget with a $100 million loan.

=== 2010s ===
In 2019, The UAE and Saudi Arabia encouraged Sudan's alignment with their interests, offering financial incentives, including a $1 billion deposit in Sudan's central bank, to reduce Sudan’s reliance on Iran. As a result, Sudan’s military support for the Gulf states solidified its strategic role in the region. The UAE also pledged US$3 billion to Sudan’s military-led government. However, the UAE halved aid to press Sudan into recognizing Israel and continued to support military dominance, to the detriment of Sudan’s economic stability.

=== Post Al Bashir ===
In 2020, Sudan exported $1.86 billion in goods to the UAE, while UAE exports to Sudan totaled $1.14 billion.

On 13 August 2022, Sudan signed a $6 billion deal with a UAE-led consortium, including AD Ports Group and Invictus Investment, to develop the Abu Amama port and an economic zone on the Red Sea. The project, backed by Abu Dhabi’s ADQ sovereign wealth fund, includes an industrial zone, an international airport, and a 400,000-acre agricultural area.

The RSF has funded its operations through a network of businesses, including gold smuggling, with much of the gold previously exported to the UAE now redirected to Egypt. Gold is central to Sudan-UAE trade, with Sudan’s official gold exports reaching $1.5 billion in 2024, nearly all going to the UAE. Smuggling routes controlled by the RSF channel an equivalent amount illegally through Chad, Libya, Ethiopia, and Egypt.

In October 2024, the UAE-based company Tradive General Trading LLC, allegedly controlled by Algoney Hamdan Daglo Musa, a senior RSF leader’s brother, has been sanctioned by the U.S. for importing vehicles and retrofitting them for the RSF.

== Military relations ==
In 2016, Sudan and the UAE signed a Memorandum of Understanding on security cooperation during the International Exhibition for National Security and Resilience in Abu Dhabi.

From 2016 onwards, the Rapid Support Forces (at the time allied to the Sudanese government) participated in the Saudi-led intervention in the Yemeni civil war on a mercenary basis, alongside Saudi Arabia and the UAE. This intervention first brought RSF leader Hemedti in contact with Emirati representatives with whom he would develop a lasting relationship.

=== Sudanese civil war (2023–present) ===
The UAE has been accused by the Sudanese Armed Forces of supporting the Rapid Support Forces (RSF), a paramilitary group engaged in violent conflict with the Sudanese army since 2023, which has led to a civil war and widespread displacement and deaths. The RSF has been involved in brutal combat with the Sudanese army, especially in the Darfur region and Khartoum, where it has committed significant atrocities. Russia’s Wagner Group is also involved in Sudan's gold trade.

According to campaign group Drone Wars UK, UAE supplied drones to the RSF and which were used in Sudan’s urban centers, such as Khartoum, has led to significant civilian casualties. Reports indicate that both the Sudanese military and RSF have deployed drones in populated areas, exacerbating the humanitarian crisis. Sudan's ambassador to the UN, in June 2024, claimed that UAE support contributed to the prolonging of the war, which has caused a severe humanitarian crisis in Sudan. The UAE denied these claims, focusing on efforts to de-escalate the conflict.

Amnesty International reported in November 2024 that UAE-made Nimr Ajban armored personnel carriers equipped with French Galix defense systems were used by the RSF, potentially violating the U.N. arms embargo on Sudan. The Sudanese army captured some of these vehicles, intensifying scrutiny on UAE’s military exports. France’s Lacroix Defense denied direct involvement, stating that its systems were sold to the UAE under strict export licenses. UAE made Nimr Ajban 440A armored personnel carriers were previously seen in 2019 in Sudan. The UAE denied supplying military material to Sudan since the start of the civil war in 2023, stating that military cooperation was previously signed in 2020 after being asked from UAE by general Al Burhan.

In late 2025, the fall of El Fasher to the Rapid Support Forces (RSF) led to widespread massacres and intensified global scrutiny of the UAE for its role in supporting the paramilitary group.

== Cultural relations ==
The UAE has cultural ties with Sudan, particularly through shared Arab and Islamic heritage, and a large Sudanese expatriate community. The UAE has also made significant contributions to humanitarian aid in Sudan, including sending over 100 flights carrying aid to the region.

=== Humanitarian aid ===
Between 1998 and early 2009, a total of nearly Dh51.3million in humanitarian aid was given by the Red Crescent to Sudan. The UAE has also initiated health projects such as Noor Dubai, which provided eye care to the Sudanese, and a mobile hospital that treated 6,500 patients in southern Sudan in 2009.

The UAE pledged $100 million at the Paris Donors Conference in April 2024, with $70 million allocated to international humanitarian organizations and $30 million supporting Sudanese refugees in neighboring countries.In September 2024, it also announced $10.25 million in new funding for Sudanese refugee women, prioritizing healthcare, psychosocial support, and gender-based violence programs.

== Diplomatic missions ==
The Sudanese Embassy is situated in Abu Dhabi, UAE.

The Emirati Embassy is situated in Khartoum, Sudan.
