= Nihad Nusseibeh =

Palestinian military commander (1926–1999)

- نهاد نسيبة
- Born: 1926; Jerusalem, Mandatory Palestine
- Died: 18 December 1999 (aged 72–73)
- Military career
- Allegiance: Palestine Liberation Organization
- Rank: Major General
- Conflicts: Golan Heights battles

Nihad Nusseibeh (Arabic: نهاد نسيبة; 1926–1999) was a Palestinian military engineer and Fatah member. He was one of the military advisers to Yasser Arafat, president of the Palestine Liberation Organization (PLO).

== Biography ==
Nusseibeh was born in Jerusalem in 1926. He hailed from a leading family. He joined the Palestinian resistance movement at age 16. He was a graduate of the Military Engineering College of the Syrian Army where he graduated in 1948. He fought in the Golan Height battles in the 1950s and became a major after the battles. He was appointed commander of the northern sector of the Golan Front in 1959.

Nusseibeh settled in Jordan in 1964 and joined the Fatah. He was named as the commander of the Detection Department in the Fatah's military training unit and led the Fatah operations. He was made the commander of the Police Force in 1970. He became the PLO leader in Jordan in 1971 when the Palestinian forces left the country after the Black September events. Nusseibeh's tenure ended in 1979. He was promoted to major general and was named as the military advisor of Yasser Arafat in 1982.

Nusseibeh died on 18 December 1999.
