= Congress of Educated Muslims =

The Congress of Educated Muslims was founded by Abd al-Qadir al-Husayni in the early 1930s to fight discrimination against Palestinian Arabs in government services.
