= Abdul Qadir al-Husayni =

Palestinian Arab nationalist (1907–1948)

Abdul Qadir al-Husayni عبد القادر الحسيني
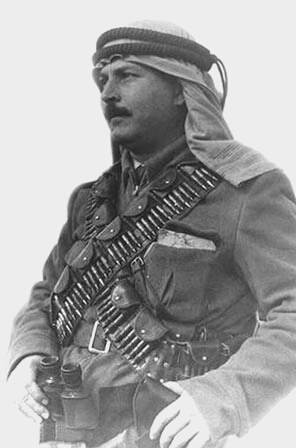
- Portrait
- Born: 1907; Jerusalem, Ottoman Empire
- Died: 8 April 1948 (aged 40–41); Al-Qastal, Mandatory Palestine
- Relatives: Musa al-Husayni (father); Faisal Husseini (son)
- Military career
- Allegiance: Palestinian Arab irregulars
- Branch: Army of the Holy War
- Service years: 1933–1948
- Conflicts: Arab revolt in Palestine; Second World War; Middle Eastern theatre; Anglo-Iraqi War; 1947–1948 civil war in Mandatory Palestine; Battle of al-Qastal

Abdul Qadir al-Husayni (Arabic: عبد القادر الحسيني, romanized: ʿAbd al-Qādir al-Ḥusaynī; 1907 – 8 April 1948) was a Palestinian revolutionary and Arab nationalist guerrilla military leader. In late 1933, he founded the secret militant group known as the Organization for Holy Struggle (Munathamat al-Jihad al-Muqaddas), which he and Hasan Salama commanded as the Army of the Holy War (Jaysh al-Jihad al-Muqaddas) during the 1936–1939 Arab revolt and the 1948 war.

== Early life and militant career ==
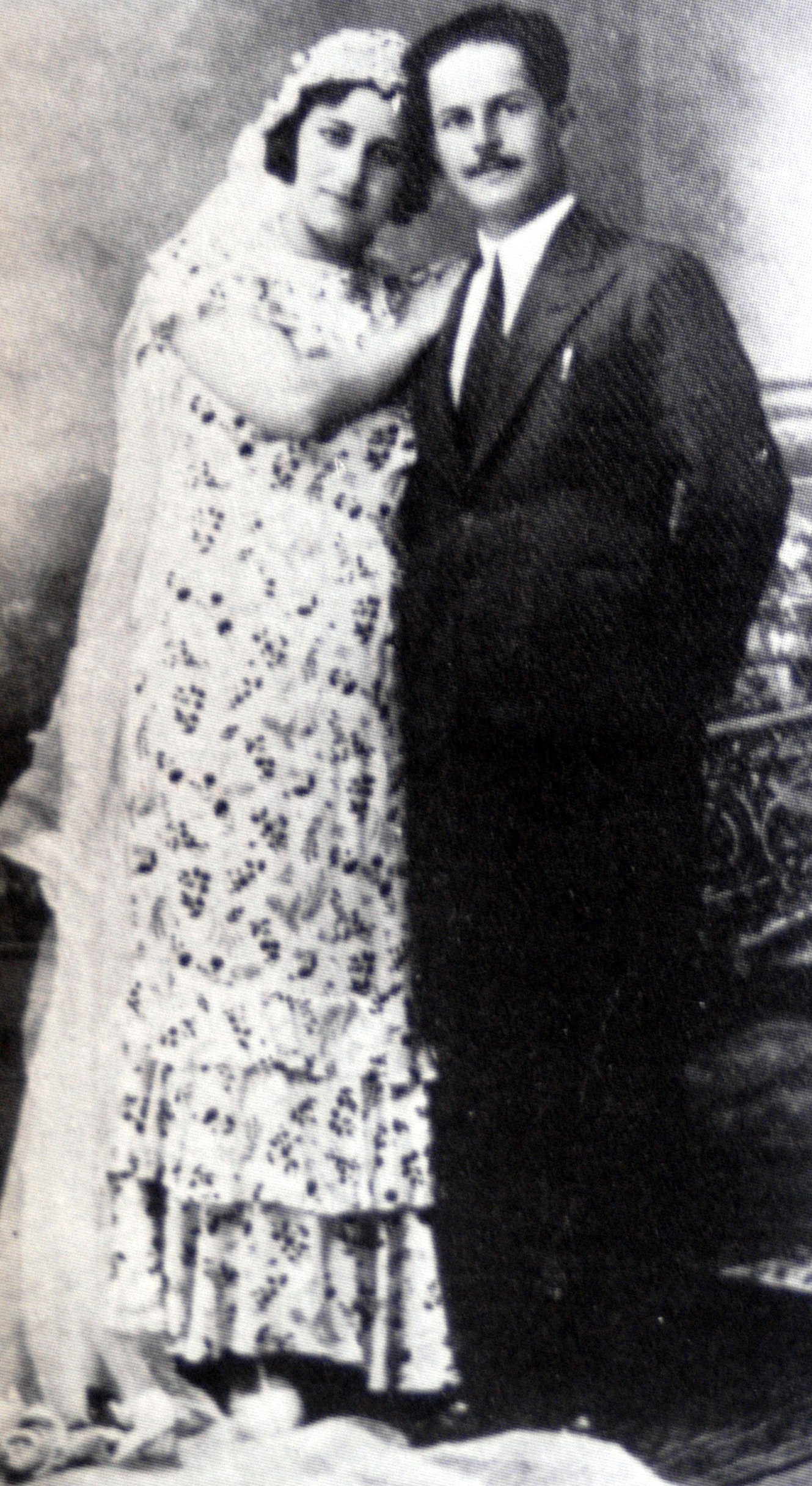
Abd al-Qadir's wedding, 1934

Husayni was born to the prominent and influential al-Husayni family of Jerusalem. He was the son of Musa al-Husayni. He lost his mother a year and a half after his birth. Subsequently, his grandmother took care of him and his seven other siblings, three girls, four boys.

His father, Musa al-Husayni, held various senior positions in the Ottoman Empire, working in Yemen, Iraq, Najd and Constantinople (Istanbul) in addition to Palestine. Because of his valuable service to the Ottoman Empire, the government granted him the title (Pasha). He was mayor of Jerusalem (1918–1920), before he was dismissed as mayor by the British authorities. He then became head of the nationalist Executive Committee of the Palestine Arab Congress from 1922 until 1934. Musa was the first to raise his voice in the face of the British Mandate and the first to call the people of Palestine to protest, demonstrate, and show their discontent and anger against the Balfour Declaration. He participated in many demonstrations, the last of which was the large demonstration in Jaffa on 27 October 1933, in which he was severely beaten with batons by the British soldiers. Musa's injuries were so serious that he remained bedridden until he died in March 1934.

Abdul Qadir completed his secondary education in Jerusalem with distinction and then started at the College of Arts and Sciences at the American University of Beirut, but did not continue his studies there. Instead, he went to and later graduated in chemistry at the American University in Cairo while organising the Congress of Educated Muslims.

Initially, he took a post in the settlement department of the British Mandate government but eventually moved to the Hebron area during the 1936–1939 Arab revolt in Palestine to lead the struggle against the British. Walid Khalidi notes that he was a guerilla commander for the Jerusalem district in the summer 1936.

A member of the Palestine Arab Party, he served as its secretary-general and became editor-in-chief of the party's paper Al-Liwa' and other newspapers, including Al-Jami'a Al-Islamiyya. Faisal would go on to found and lead the Arab Studies Society, become the head of Fatah in the West Bank, and hold the position of Minister for Jerusalem Affairs within the Palestinian Authority.

In 1938, Abdul Qadir was exiled and in 1939 moved to Iraq where he took part in the Golden Square coup d'état. He moved to Egypt in 1946, but surreptitiously returned to Palestine to lead the Army of the Holy War in January 1948.

== Death ==
Husayni was killed while personally reconnoitring an area of Qastal Hill shrouded by fog, in the early hours of 8 April 1948. His forces later captured al-Qastal from the Haganah, which had occupied the village at the start of Operation Nachshon six days earlier with a force of about 100 men. They retreated to the Jewish settlement of Motza. Palmach troops recaptured the village on the night of 8–9 April, losing 18 men in the attack; most of the houses were blown up and the hill became a command post. Husayni's death was regarded as a factor in the loss of morale among his forces.

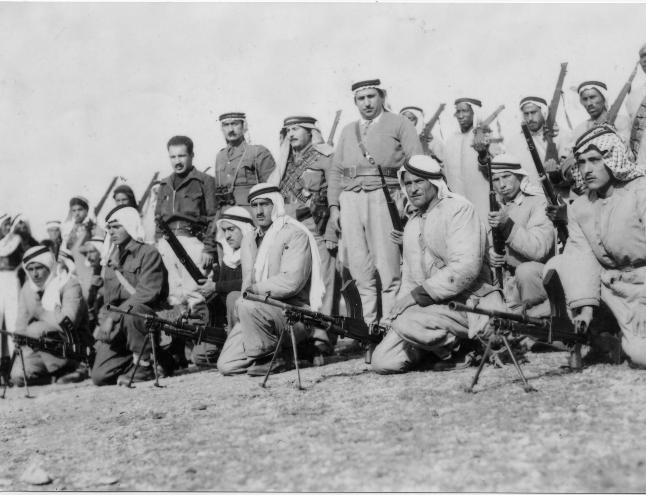
Abdul Qader al-Husseini with his troops prior to the January 1948 attack on Kfar Etzion. Photograph taken by a Palmach spy

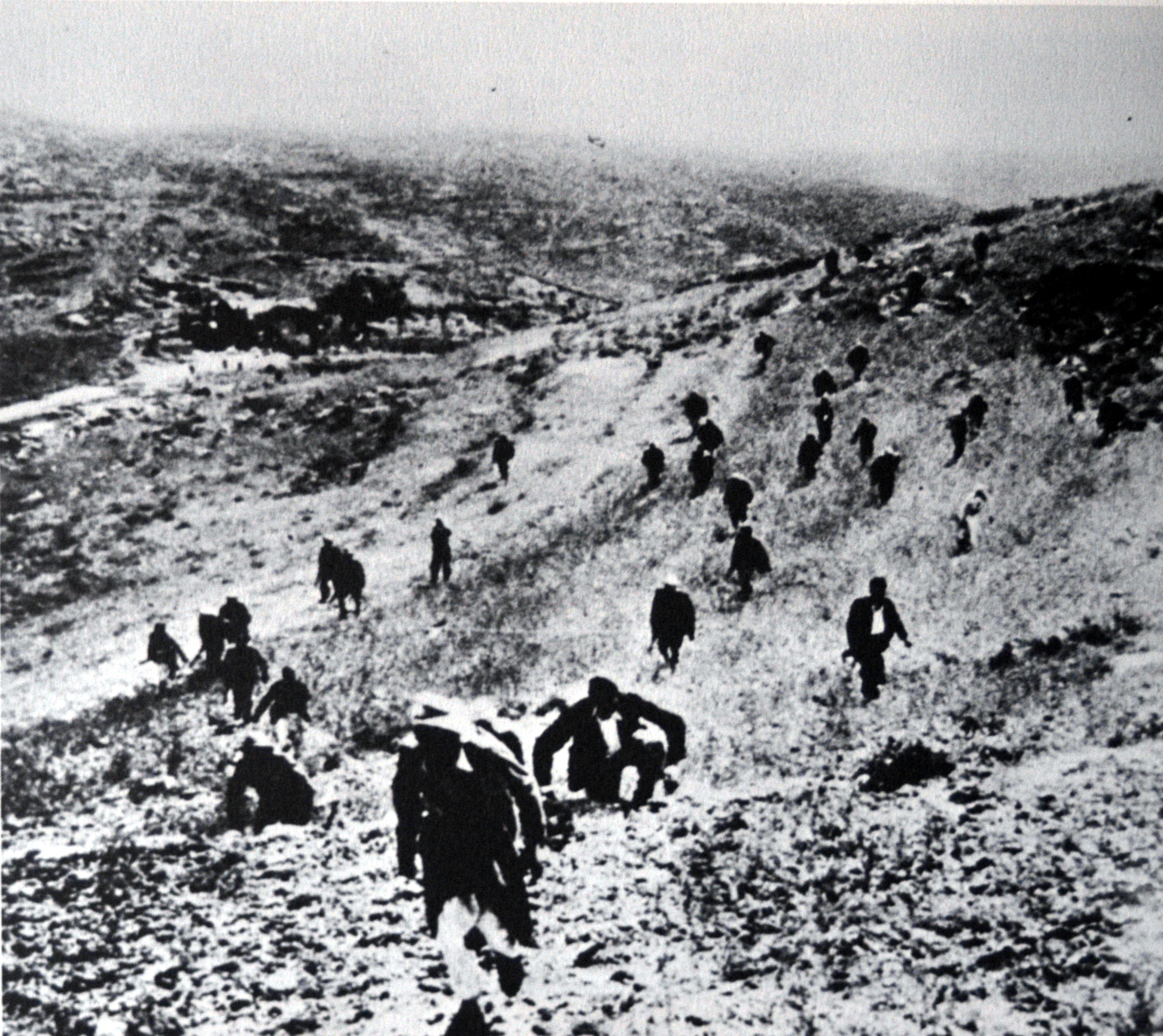
Palestine irregulars under Qader al-Husseini about to attack al-Qastal 7–8 April 1948

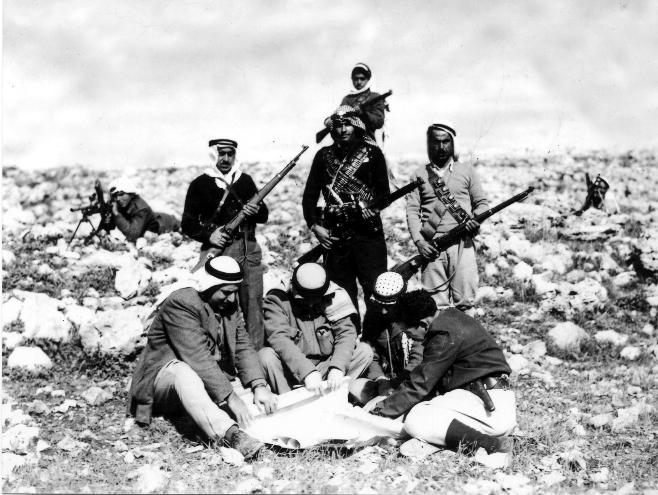
Abdul Qader al-Husseini with his officers on the day he was killed

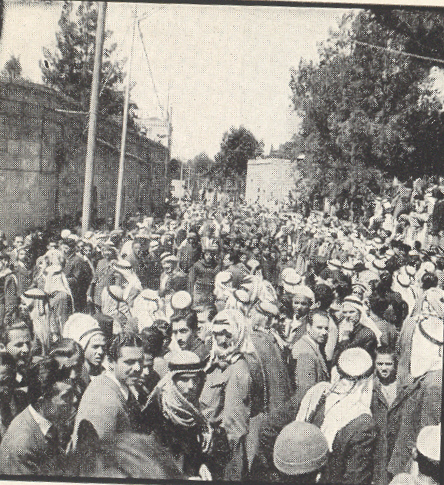
Mourners at Husayni's funeral gather near Sheikh Jarrah

He was buried in the Khātūniyya by the al-Aqsa Compound (Ḥaram esh-Sharīf); the tombs of his father and his son are in the same mausoleum.

== Personal life ==
Abdul Qadir married in 1934. In 1940, his son Faisal Husseini was born.

== See also ==
- Ben Yehuda Street bombing
