= Committee Confronting the Iron Fist =

Group protesting occupation of Palestine

The Committee Confronting the Iron Fist was a group comprising Palestinians and Israelis who demonstrated together to end the occupation of Palestine, active preceding and during the First Intifada.

Activities of the group included demonstrations, providing information, human rights activities, and representation at international forums on Palestine.

== History ==
The Committee Confronting the Iron Fist was created by the Arab Studies Society, which Faisal Al-Husseini founded in Jerusalem in 1979 as an association committed to preserving and making Palestinian history accessible via the accumulation of archival materials, personal photographs, and newspaper clippings. Al-Husseini has been described as a spokesperson or leader for the Committee Confronting the Iron Fist.

Activities of the Committee Confronting the Iron Fist included a joint protest march in East Jerusalem on 14 June 1987, attended by some 300-400 Palestinians and some 40 Israelis.

The Committee Confronting the Iron Fist was also included in the 1987-1989 membership of the International Co-ordinating Committee for NGOs on the question of Palestine.

== See also ==
- Iron Fist policy
