= The People's Voice =

The People's Voice (Hebrew: המפקד הלאומי, lit. 'The National Census') is an Israeli-Palestinian civil initiative dedicated to advancing the process of achieving peace between Israelis and the Palestinians.

== History ==
Co-founders Ami Ayalon, former head of the Shin Bet, and Sari Nusseibeh, president of Al-Quds University and a former key Palestinian Authority leader, signed the initiative on 27 July 2002 and officially launched it at a press conference held in Tel-Aviv on 25 June 2003.

The People's Voice website reported on 26 May 2004, 183,400 Israelis and 140,000 Palestinians having signed the initiative. In late 2007 the website went off-line. The Hebrew part went back on-line in 2008, and on 11 October 2008 reported 251,000 Israelis and 160,000 Palestinians having signed.

== Issues ==
The peace plan wanted to face the problem, that at this time the leaders of both sides, Benjamin Netanyahu and Mahmoud Abbas were prepared to make the compromises for peace at this stage, either because of weakness, ideological rigidity, extremist vetoes, or a combination of all of these. The goal was, to publicly challenge Netanyahu to place this plan on the Israeli ballot as a referendum and on the Palestinian side to publicly challenge Abbas to call for new elections.

The key proposals of the initiative were:

- Two states for two peoples.
- Borders based upon the June 4, 1967 lines.
- Jerusalem will be an open city, the capital of two states.
- Palestinian refugees will return only to the Palestinian state.
- Palestine will be demilitarized.

Upon the full implementation of these principles, all claims on both sides and the Israeli–Palestinian conflict will end.

Unlike a number of other proposals, the initiative tried to resolve the conflict in a single agreement. No phased or interim steps were envisioned.

On their website they published a more detailed roadmap.

The initiative seeks to affect the political process by petition, seeking the signatures of enough residents of the area on all sides of the conflict to drive the leaders of the various sides to concluding a peace agreement.

== Arab–Israeli peace diplomacy and treaties ==
- Geneva Accord
- Paris Peace Conference, 1919
- Faisal–Weizmann Agreement (1919)
- 1949 Armistice Agreements
- Camp David Accords (1978)
- Egypt–Israel peace treaty (1979)
- Madrid Conference of 1991
- Oslo Accords (1993)
- Israel–Jordan peace treaty (1994)
- Camp David 2000 Summit
- Israeli–Palestinian peace process
- Projects working for peace among Israelis and Arabs
- List of Middle East peace proposals
- International law and the Arab–Israeli conflict
