= Wadi Hunayn =

Wadi Hunayn وادي حنين
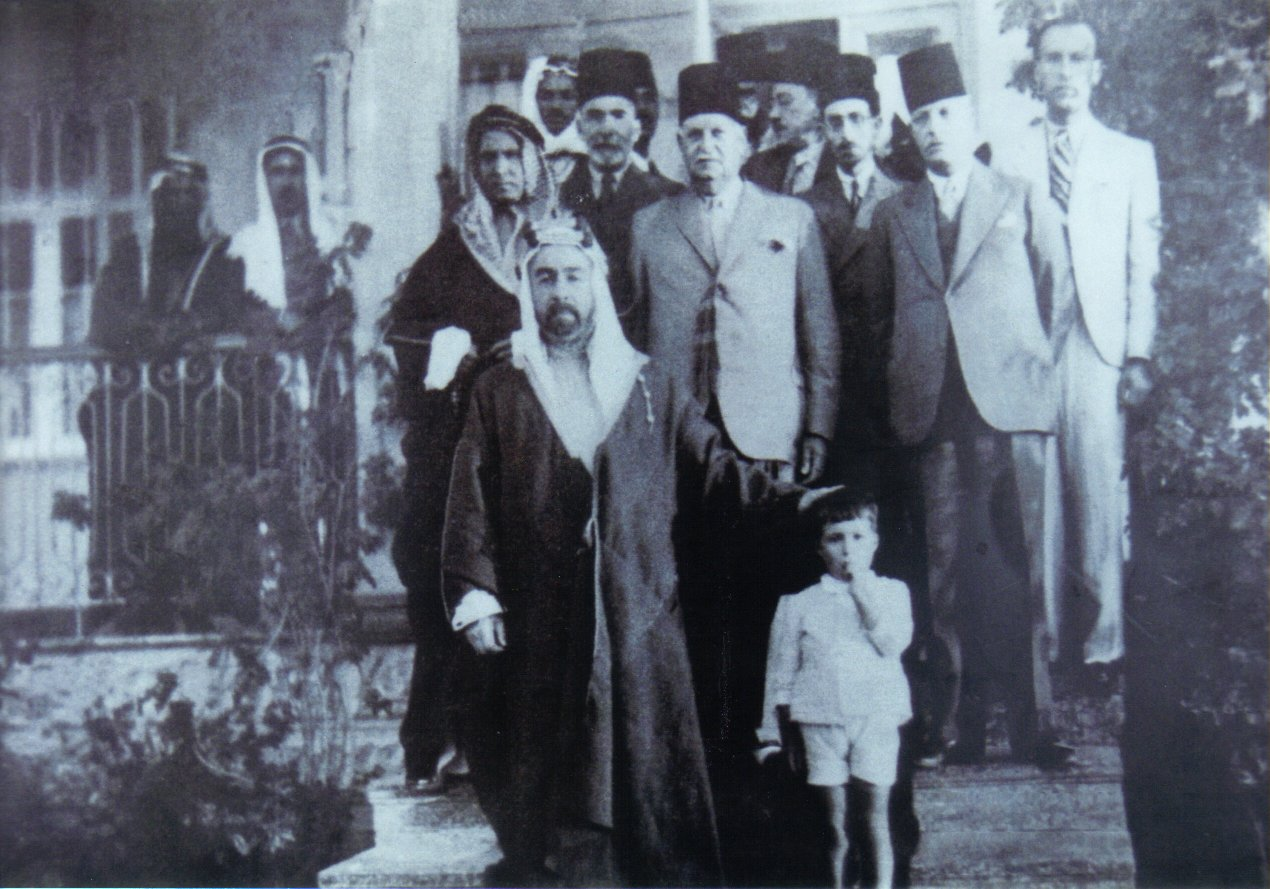
- Abd-El-Rahman Taji and King Abdullah I of Jordan in Wadi Hunayn between 1920 and 1930.

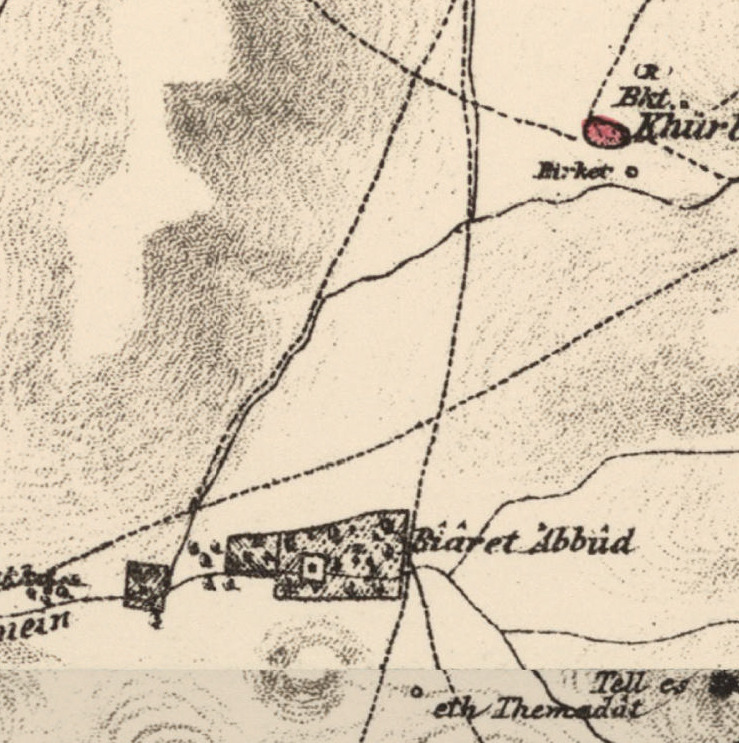
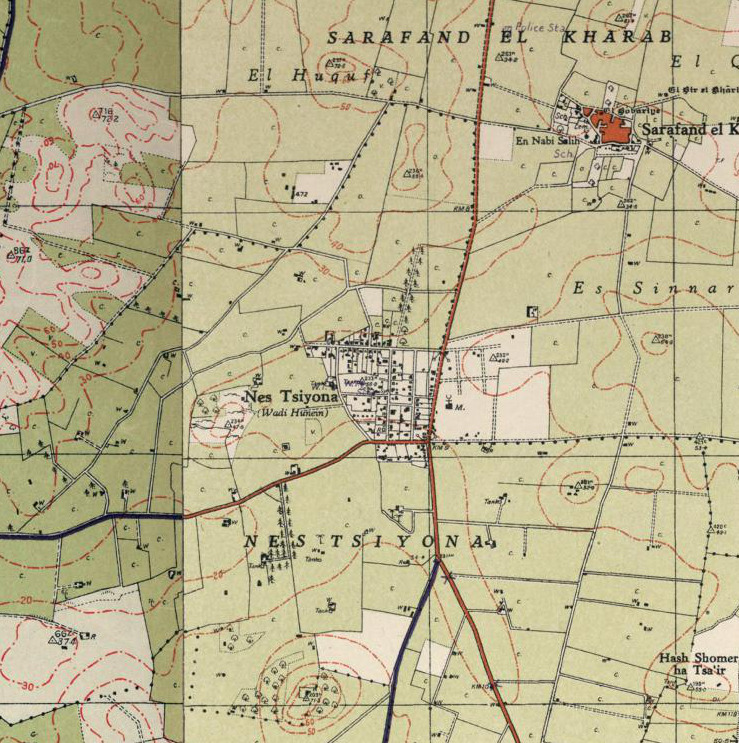
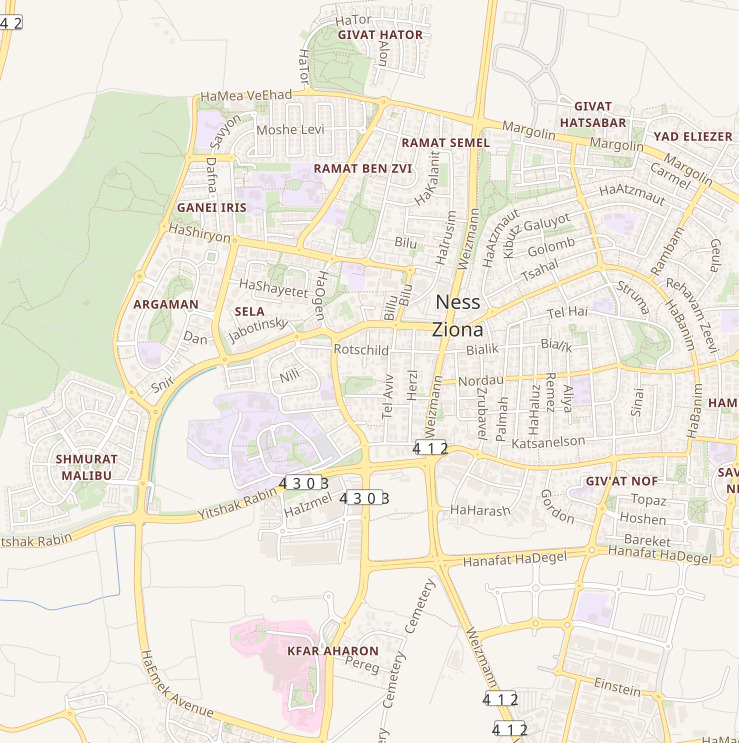
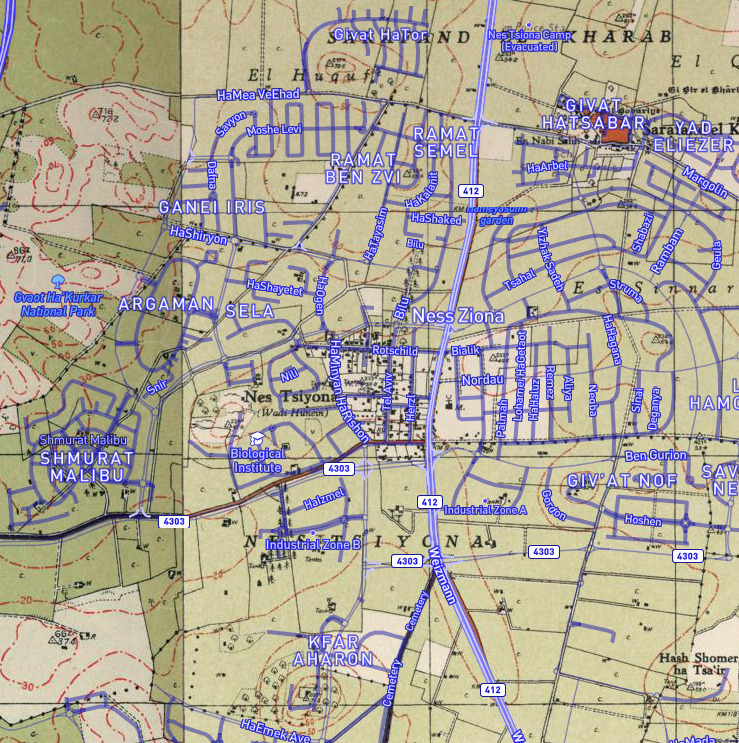
- 1870s map 1940s map modern map 1940s with modern overlay map A series of historical maps of the area around Wadi Hunayn (click the buttons)

- Location within Mandatory Palestine
- Coordinates: 31°55′39″N 34°47′43″E
- Palestine grid: 130/148
- Geopolitical entity: Mandatory Palestine
- Subdistrict: Ramle
- Date of depopulation: 17 April 1948

Population (1945)
  - Total: 1,620
- Cause(s) of depopulation: Influence of nearby town's fall
- Current Localities: Israel Institute for Biological Research, Nes Tziyyona,

Wadi Hunayn (Arabic: وادي حنين) was a Palestinian Arab village in the Ramle Subdistrict, located 9 km west of Ramla. According to a local tradition, it was named after the Yemeni home of the Qada'a tribe who settled here in the early Islamic period.

== History ==
In 1881, it was noted as being named Wady Hanein, meaning "The valley of Hanein" (or Honein); the word means the cry of a she-camel to her colt.

=== British Mandate era ===
At the time of the 1922 census of Palestine, Wadi Hunayn had a population of 195 inhabitants, all Muslims, which increased to 278 Muslims and 2 Christians, living in 55 houses, by the 1931 census.

In the 1945 statistics, there were 1,620 Muslims and 1,760 Jews estimated to live in Wadi Hunayn and Ness Ziona together.

Its main export was citrus, grown in orchards that were irrigated by numerous water wells dug around the village. The residents worked in the orchards and sold their yield at the cities. They grew bananas and grains as well. During the 1940s, the village became a main source of basic supplies and meat for the nearby Jewish and Palestinian inhabitants due to its strategic location on the main road.

=== 1948, aftermath ===
The village was depopulated during the 1947–48 Civil War in Mandatory Palestine. The majority of the inhabitants fled the village during January 1948, with the remaining population being transported into Jordan by the Haganah who entered the village on 19 April 1948. Wadi Hunayn was mostly destroyed by the Haganah forces, who blew up all the buildings near the main road as well as the local mosque's minaret, since the village was used as a launching point for Arab attacks on Jewish convoys to Jerusalem. Only a few of the original houses of the village remained, while the mosque (built in 1934) was converted into a synagogue by the neighboring Jewish population of Ness Ziona and renamed "Geulat Yisra'el" ("Israel's salvation").

=== People from Wadi Hunayn ===
- Nuzha Al-Ghussein (1926–2013), Palestinian political and women's rights activist

== Bibliography ==
- Barron, J. B., ed. (1923). Palestine: Report and General Abstracts of the Census of 1922. Government of Palestine.
- Department of Statistics (1945). Village Statistics, April, 1945. Government of Palestine.
- Hadawi, S. (1970). Village Statistics of 1945: A Classification of Land and Area ownership in Palestine. Palestine Liberation Organization Research Center.
- Khalidi, W. (1992). All That Remains: The Palestinian Villages Occupied and Depopulated by Israel in 1948. Washington D.C.: Institute for Palestine Studies. ISBN 0-88728-224-5.
- Mills, E., ed. (1932). Census of Palestine 1931. Population of Villages, Towns and Administrative Areas. Jerusalem: Government of Palestine.
- Morris, B. (2004). The Birth of the Palestinian Refugee Problem Revisited. Cambridge University Press. ISBN 978-0-521-00967-6.
- Palmer, E. H. (1881). The Survey of Western Palestine: Arabic and English Name Lists Collected During the Survey by Lieutenants Conder and Kitchener, R. E. Transliterated and Explained by E.H. Palmer. Committee of the Palestine Exploration Fund.
