= Zaki Nusseibeh =

Minister in the United Arab Emirates

Zaki Anwar Nusseibeh
- زكي انور نسيبة
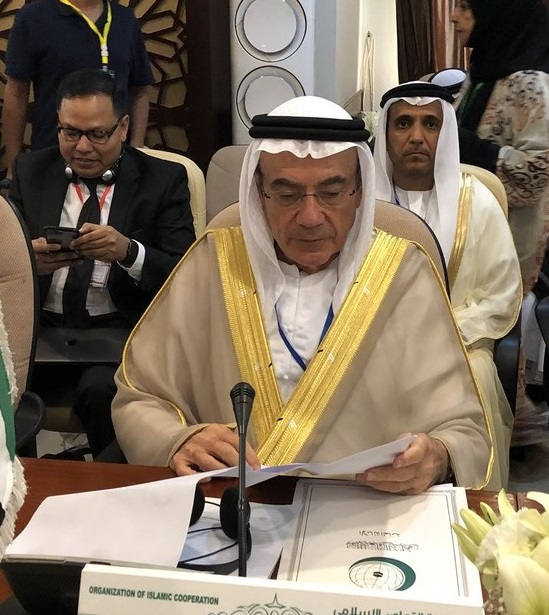

Minister of State
- In office October 2017 – February 2021
- President: Mohammed bin Zayed Al Nahyan
- Prime Minister: Mohammed bin Rashid Al Maktoum

Personal details
- Born: 1946 (age 79–80) Jerusalem, Mandatory Palestine
- Children: Lana Nusseibeh, Dyala Nusseibeh, Anwar Nusseibeh
- Parents: Anwar Nusseibeh (father); Nuzha Al-Ghussein (mother)
- Education: University of Cambridge

Zaki Anwar Nusseibeh (Arabic: زكي انور نسيبة) is the Cultural Advisor to the President of the UAE and the Chancellor of UAE University. He has been active in government service in the United Arab Emirates since its formation in 1971, and with the Government of the Emirate of Abu Dhabi since 1968.

Before his current role, Nusseibeh served as Minister of State in the Ministry of Foreign Affairs (2017-2021), where he contributed to the establishment and management of the Office of Public and Cultural Diplomacy, as a coordinating body committed to international cooperation through cross-cultural dialogue and exchange through the promotion of UAE arts and culture abroad. He previously served as Assistant Minister in the Ministry of Foreign Affairs, and Cultural Advisor at the UAE Presidential Court, later Ministry of Presidential Affairs.

From the late 1960s, he acted as the personal interpreter and adviser to the founder of the UAE, Sheikh Zayed bin Sultan Al Nahyan. He then acted in the same role with his successor UAE President Sheikh Khalifa bin Zayed Al Nahyan.

== Early life and career ==
Born in Jerusalem, Zaki Nusseibeh was educated at St. George's School, Jerusalem, and completed his secondary education at Rugby School, Warwickshire, UK. He then attended Queen's College, University of Cambridge, graduating with an MA (with honors) degree in economics in 1967.

Many of Nusseibeh's family were displaced during the conflict that led to the establishment of the state of Israel in 1948. His mother, Nuzha Al Ghoussein, left with her family from Ramleh in 1948 and her brother, Talat Al Ghoussein, subsequently became Kuwait's Ambassador to Washington in 1970. Nusseibeh's father, Anwar Nusseibeh who had lost a leg during the 1948 war, became active in Jordanian politics, and held several cabinet posts in the Jordanian government, including Defense, Interior and Education in the 1950s, and stood for Parliament as well as serving in the Senate.

As a young student in England, Nusseibeh was involved in Palestinian politics, forming an Arab Society at the University of Cambridge which held debates and invited speakers on topical issues in contemporary Arab politics.

Nusseibeh graduated from Cambridge at the time of the June 1967 Arab-Israeli war, and a return to Jerusalem was not a feasible option. He instead settled in Abu Dhabi, where he worked as a freelance journalist for a number of British and Arab publications including The Economist, The Financial Times and the BBC Arabic Service. He was soon asked to join the Abu Dhabi government, working briefly with the newly established Civil Service Authority (1968-1969), then moving to Abu Dhabi's Department of Information as Director of Research and Documentation. There he helped in establishing Abu Dhabi's first newspapers in Arabic and English (Al-Ittihad 1969, Abu Dhabi Times 1969). He then became Director of Information in the newly formed UAE Federal Ministry of Information (1972-1975).

While at the Ministry of Information, he also worked as an English language broadcaster and program producer, and helped plan and develop an information and media strategy for the government. He was also involved in the preparing, editing and translating of all its books and publications.

In 1975, Zaki Nusseibeh became the Director of the Press Office in the Diwan (Court) of Sheikh Zayed, subsequently becoming an Adviser while continuing his role as the President's personal interpreter.

== Art and culture in diplomacy ==
Zaki Nusseibeh has served on several public and private bodies dealing with the development of cultural and educational strategies in the UAE. He was Deputy Chairman of the Abu Dhabi Authority for Culture and Heritage (2006-2012) and a member of the Board of the Abu Dhabi Authority for Tourism and Culture (2012-2016), today the Abu Dhabi Department of Culture and Tourism. In this capacity, he contributed to the development of some of Abu Dhabi's major cultural and art initiatives, such as the Saadiyat Culture District and its leading museums.

Nusseibeh's publications include translations of Gulf and Arab poetry into several European languages as well as articles in different journals and newspapers.

He has recently published a book in Arabic about a tribal leader who was a close companion to Sheikh Zayed, the founder of the United Arab Emirates (Sheikh Zayed Wa Salem Bin Hamm, Rifqat Oumor, Abu Dhabi 2019).

== Affiliations and chairmanships ==
Zaki Nusseibeh has served on several public and private bodies dealing with the development of cultural and educational strategies in the UAE.

Nusseibeh was appointed as the chairman of the Board of Trustees of the Sorbonne University Abu Dhabi in 2018, having helped to establish the university in 2006.

He is a member of the Administrative Board of the Emirates Diplomatic Academy with oversight responsibility for its management (2017–present). He is also a member on several other Boards including the Sheikh Zayed Book Award (2005–present), the International Prize for ArabicFiction (2009–present) and Abu Dhabi University (2003–present).

He was elected to the American Academy of Arts and Sciences in Washington (2020).

Nusseibeh was the chairman of the advisory board for the Middle East Centre of the London School of Economics (2015-2018), as well as the President of the Alliance Française in Paris (2013-2017).

He was also the President of the Alliance Française Abu Dhabi (1977-2017) and of the UAE Chapter of the International Friends of Richard Wagner Society (2008–present) and a member of the Board of Trustees of the Agha Khan Museum in Toronto (2016-2019).

He is also the Chancellor of the United Arab Emirates University (UAEU).

== Awards ==
- Medal for Merit to Culture - ‘Gloria Artis’, Republic of Poland (2010)
- Ring of Tolerance, The European Academy of Science and Arts, Frankfurt (2012)
- The Abu Dhabi Award (2007)
- Kennedy Center Gold Medal in the Arts, John F. Kennedy Center for the Performing Arts (2014)
- Officer of the French Legion of Honour (2015)
- The personality of the Year, Emirates Literary Festival (2018)
- Exceptional Excellence Award, Beirut Institute (2019)
- The UAE Order of the Union medal (2021)

== Personal life ==
Zaki Nusseibeh's daughter is Lana Nusseibeh, a diplomat who served as the United Arab Emirates Permanent Representative to the United Nations from 2013 to 2024.
