= Nusaybah family =

Palestinian family in Jerusalem

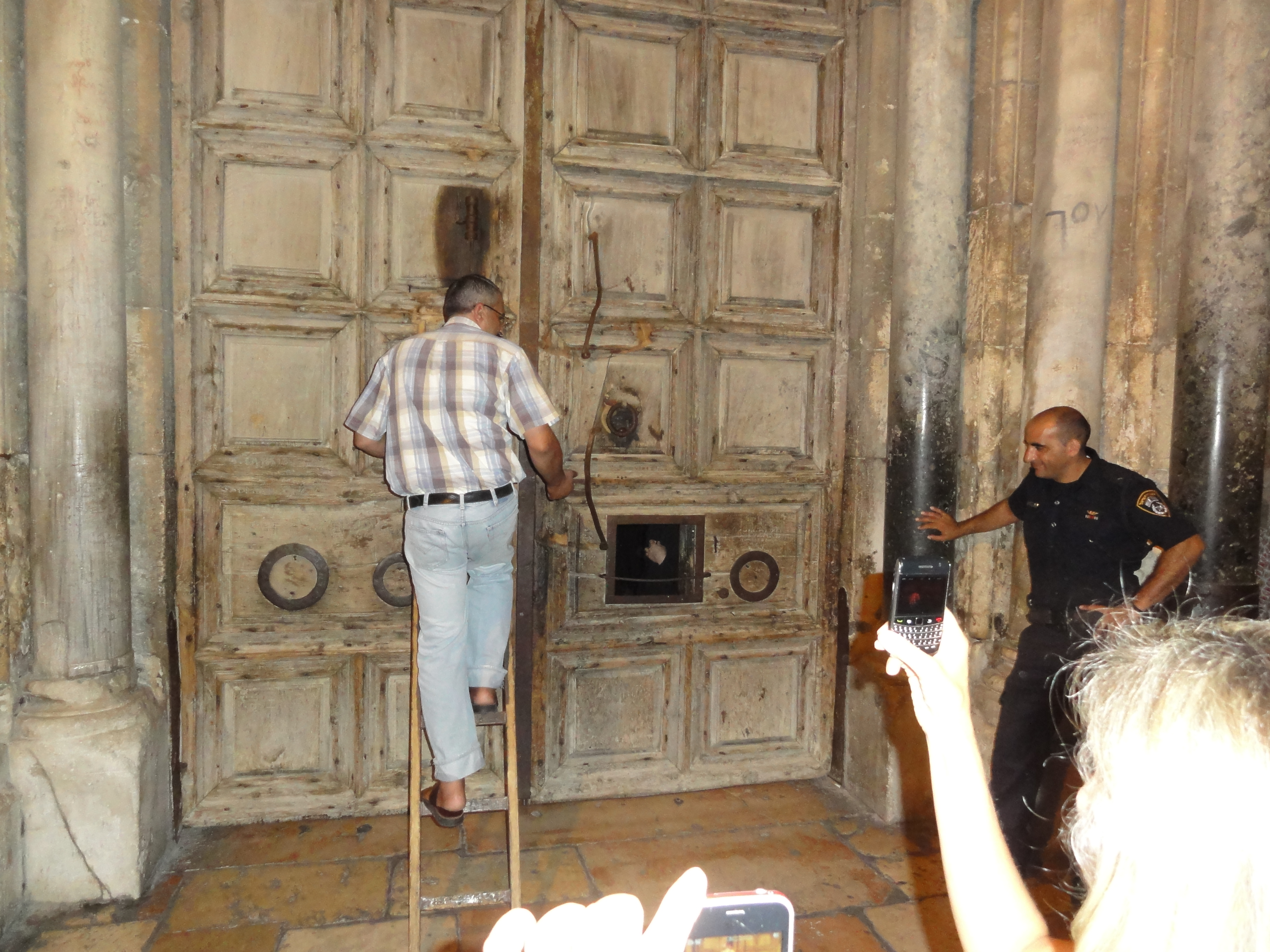
Closing ceremony for the Church of the Holy Sepulchre

The Nussayba family, commonly spelt in English as Nuseibeh (Arabic: عائلة نسيبة; also spelt Nussaiba, Nusaibah and Nusseibeh) is a prominent Palestinian family and the oldest Muslim dynasty in Jerusalem. The Nussayba family has a long history and tight bonds with the Holy Land and Arab Christians since their ancestors conquered Jerusalem in 637.

The Nusseibeh family is historically and genealogically linked to Ubadah ibn al-Samit, a companion of the Prophet, who was a member of the Banu Khazraj of Medina. Ubadah played a significant role in early Islamic history, including participating in the Aqaba pledges and the battles of Uhud and Badr. The family has been recognized for tracing its lineage to him, a well-documented connection in historical and genealogical sources. While Nusaybah bint Ka'ab (Umm Umarah), an esteemed female companion of the Prophet known for her bravery in battle, is sometimes mentioned with the family, this association is more symbolic than genealogical. The Nusseibeh name may reflect respect for Nusaybah's leadership and contributions, but genealogically, the family is more accurately descended from Ubadah ibn al-Samit.

Since the arrival of Islam in Jerusalem in the seventh century, this Sunni Muslim family has held the keys of the Church of the Holy Sepulchre, Christianity's holiest site, alongside the Joudeh Al Husseini family (who were added to the original arrangement in the time of Saladin, the Muslim conqueror who seized the holy city from the Crusaders in 1187). This arrangement emerged during the days of the second Rashid caliph, Umar, who hoped to avoid clashes among rival Christian sects for control over the church. Although symbolic, the arrangement has provided the stability the city's Christians needed. It is a symbol of tolerance and interreligious harmony, and gave the Nussaiba family a visible role in Christian activities in Jerusalem, which include pilgrimages and visits by Western Christians.

== Family roots ==
Ancestors of the family are believed to have arrived in Jerusalem as early as 300 BC during Hellenistic Palestine. The Nusayba settled in Palestine in 637. The family married and mixed with multiple notable Levant families from Christian and Muslim religious backgrounds, such as the el-Issa Family and Al Ghussein family. The original Muslim Nusseibeh clan included two companions of Muhammad — Abdullah bin Nussaiba and Muadh ibn Jabal, and many other of Muhammad's companions and maternal uncles, descendants of Salma from Banu Najjar, a clan of the banu Khazraj, the wife of Hashim, forefather of the Hashemite family and mother of its renowned leader Abd al-Muttalib, grandfather of Muhammed. The Nussaiba family is a clan of the Khazraj tribe of Medina, known in Islam as al-Ansar, for their support and protection of Muhammed during his exile from Mecca.

== Nussaiba and the Church of the Holy Sepulchre ==
After the conquest of Aelia Capitolina, which would be once again called Jerusalem, Sophronius, the Patriarch of the city, invited Umar to pray salah at the Church of the Holy Sepulchre, Christianity's holiest site. Umar refused to do so, fearing that future Muslim generations would claim the church as their own and turn it into a mosque. Umar instead prayed a few yards away, where the Mosque of Umar was built. Umar also signed the "Covenant of Umar", guaranteeing protection for the Christians to live and worship freely and also protection for the Christian places of worship in exchange for the Christians' surrender to the Muslims.

The ancient records and manuscripts kept by the various Christian denominations in their monasteries all record the Nussaiba family’s relationship and that of their ancestral forefathers from the banu Khazraj to the Holy Sepulchre, at least since the time of Saladin more than 800 years ago, specifically since 1182, when Sultan Saladin and King Richard the Lionheart concluded an agreement allowing western Christian pilgrims to visit the Holy Sepulchre under specific stipulations. Saladin entrusted the custody of the Holy Sepulchre's doors and all matters relating to it to a local notable, Ghanim ibn Ali ibn Hussein al-Ansari al-Khazraj the Jerusalemite. Ghanim had been born in Burin near Nablus in AH 562, where his family had taken refuge after the Crusader conquest of Jerusalem in (1087).

== Notable members ==
Notable members of the family have included:

- Anwar Nusseibeh a former minister in Jordan and diplomat to the UK
- Bashar Ahmad Nuseibeh (1967–), Professor of Computing at The Open University, UK
- Hazem Nuseibeh Jordanian foreign minister
- Lana Zaki Nusseibeh, United Arab Emirates diplomat and minister
- Nihad Nusseibeh, military officer and member of Fatah
- N.S. Nuseibeh, British-Palestinian writer
- Sari Nusseibeh, professor of philosophy and president of the Al-Quds University in Jerusalem
- Zaki Nusseibeh, United Arab Emirates minister of state.
