= Moshe Amirav =

Israeli political scientist

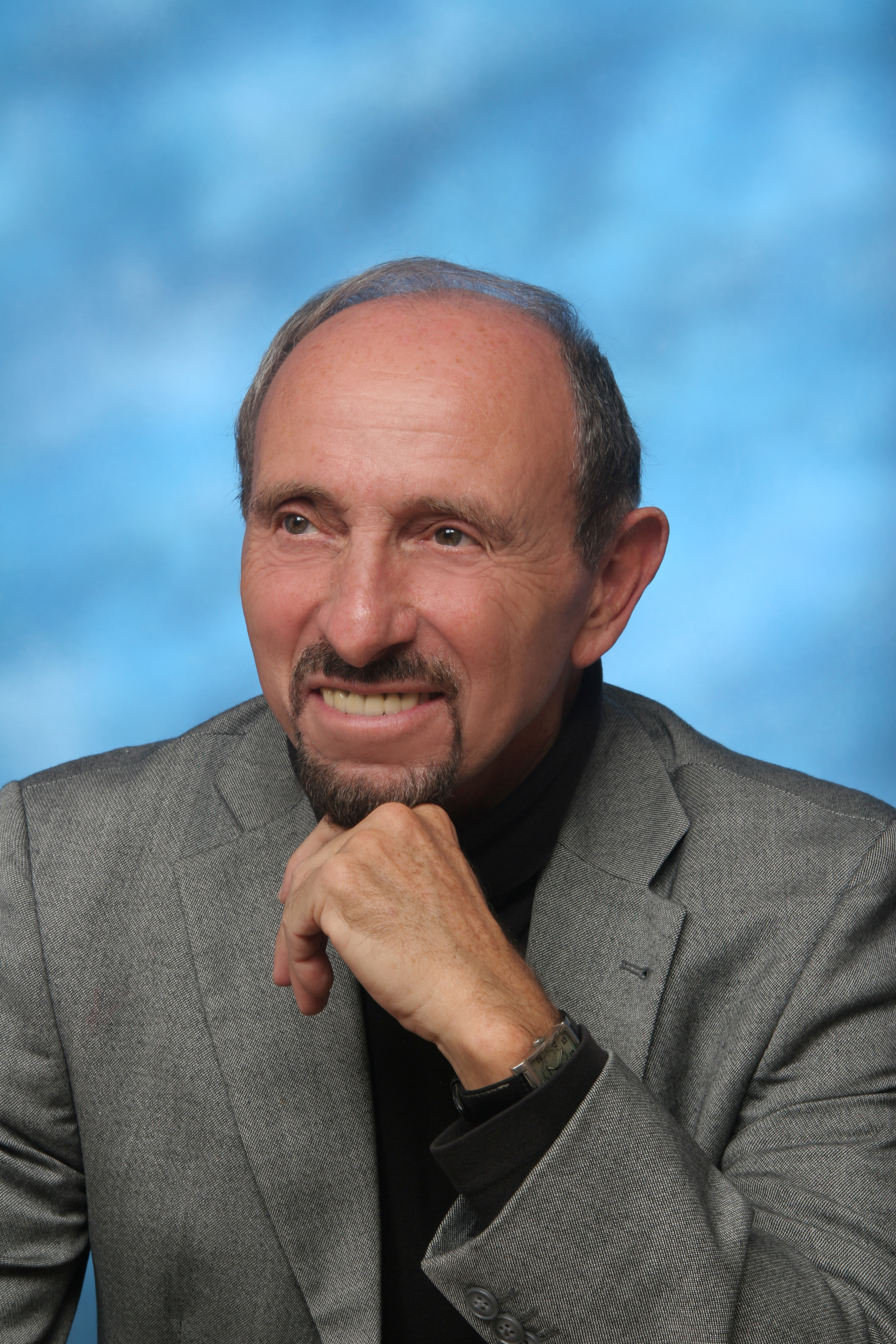
MOSHE AMIRAV

Moshe Amirav (Hebrew: משה עמירב) is an Israeli expert on the conflict in Jerusalem. He is a frequent lecturer at international conferences and forums on Jerusalem and has authored six books and many articles on this subject.

== Overview ==
Amirav is a professor of Political Science at the Hebrew University of Jerusalem and an expert on the Jerusalem political conflict. During the Six-Day War he served as a paratrooper and was wounded in the battle for Jerusalem on the day Israel captured the Old City, June 7, 1967. In the years 1981–1993, he worked closely with then Mayor of Jerusalem, Teddy Kollek, in charge of planning and development. In 2001 as advisor to Prime Minister Ehud Barak during the Camp David negotiations, Amirav headed a committee of experts who prepared blueprints for a political settlement in Jerusalem. The model is an open city when the Arab part will be the capital of Palestine and the Jewish part capital of Israel, Temple Mount with no sovereignty.

== Political activity ==
Amirav was involved in the political arena for many years. In 1987 he was the first to initiate negotiations with the PLO with Faisal Husseini, then leader of the Palestinians in Jerusalem with whom he prepared a plan for a confederative political settlement between Jordan, Palestine and Israel. That year, the president of Romania, Nicolae Ceaușescu, invited Yitzhak Shamir and Yasser Arafat, to Romania for the first peace conference between the Israelis and Palestinians, on the bases of "The Amirav Husseini Plan". Prime Minister Shamir refused and Husseini was imprisoned. Amirav left the Likud party. His leave certainly had great impact at the time in Israel and abroad. In 1988 he established the "Semitic Confederation Movement" which included Israelis, Jordanians and Palestinians, academics, retired ex-Israeli generals and other public figures. He then initiated the first public peace conference between Israeli and P.L.O. personalities. This took place under the auspices of the Belgian government in Brussels. In 1989 he organized at Stanford University the meeting of top position Israelis and P.L.O. They signed the first peace agreement. Amirav is considered in Israel as the first barrier breaker with the Palestinians.

== Jerusalem Syndrome ==
Amirav's book, "Jerusalem Syndrome: The Palestinian-Israeli Battle for the Holy City" was published by Sussex Academic Press in June 2009.

The book analyzes how Israel has failed in its attempts to unify the city, and presents the argument that Israel should relinquish its claim on Palestinian neighborhoods and villages incorporated in 1967. Amirav suggests a unique and creative idea for a solution in Jerusalem: The Old City will be considered as a special zone neither Palestinian nor an Israeli sovereignty and will be run by a special regime.

== Documentary ==
In 2007, his son, Nathanel Goldman Amirav, released a documentary about his father's employee, an undocumented Palestinian worker who "sneaks across the border from East Jerusalem to come to work every day." Goldman Amirav called the documentary My Father's Palestinian Slave.
