= Sol Phryne =

Ferry

- Sol Phryne with Sol Maritime Services markings

History
- Name: Taisetsu Maru; Aeolis; Sol Phryne
- Builder: Mitsubishi Jukogyo, Kobe, Japan
- Launched: 1948
- Completed: October 1948
- Fate: Crippled by a limpet mine on 16 February 1988

General characteristics
- Type: Ferry
- Displacement: 6150 tonnes.
- Length: 118.7 m (389 ft)
- Beam: 15.9 m (52 ft)
- Speed: 15.5 knots (28.7 km/h; 17.8 mph)
- Capacity: 630 passengers

Sol Phryne was a ferry of Sol Maritime Services Ltd. She was bought by the Palestine Liberation Organisation and sunk on 16 February 1988.

Sol Phryne was built in Japan in 1948 as Taisetsu Maru （大雪丸）.

From 1967 to 1974, she was owned by Efthymiades Line and used for regular ferry duties between Greek islands as Eolis. In 1974, she was purchased by Sol Maritime Services Ltd., renamed Sol Phryne and was then used in the Middle East, notably evacuating Palestinian guerrillas from Beirut in 1982. She was sunk during an attempt to ferry Palestinian deportees to Haifa, Israel.

== Voyage ==
The 6,151-ton Sol Phryne was purchased in some secrecy by the Palestine Liberation Organization and renamed Al Awda ("the Return"). The PLO planned to symbolically ferry 135 Palestinian deportees and, if they accepted the short notice invitation, hundreds of journalists and other observers, to the Israeli port city of Haifa for a "journey of return", echoing the 1947 journey of SS Exodus.

Israeli Defence Minister Yitzhak Rabin stated that Israel would oppose the voyage "in whatever ways we find," while Prime Minister Yitzhak Shamir labeled the journey "a declaration of war".

A different, chartered ship had been scheduled to sail from Piraeus on 9 February, but the departure was postponed several times because Greek ship owners feared commercial retaliations from Israel if their vessel was used. With this difficulty chartering a ship, on 13 February 1988 the PLO purchased the Sol Phryne in Limassol, Cyprus at auction for $600,000. By the time of the sinking the crew of the ship had not been informed of the new owners.

On 15 February, three high-ranking military officials of the PLO were assassinated in Limassol by a remote-controlled bomb planted on their car.

18 hours later, on the night of 15 February, a limpet mine attached to the hull exploded and holed a fuel tank of the Sol Phryne, flooding it and causing the ship to list. No casualties were reported but this ended the attempt. Yassar Arafat alleged that this was done by Israeli frogmen but did not provide any evidence to support his claim, The Sol Phryne was raised and transferred to Bijela, in Yugoslavia. As Time reported, "Israel officially denied complicity in the car bombing but hardly bothered to conceal its role in disabling the ferry" and suspicions of Israeli involvement were further reinforced when Israeli Transport Minister Chaim Corfu threatened that, if a further attempt was made by the PLO, "its fate will be the same". Fuad al-Bitar, Athens representative of the PLO told an Athens news conference that "it is clear that the only one interested" in the sabotage was Israel. In July 2008, Haaretz referred to this attack, without admitting Israeli responsibility, in the context of the scheduled and ultimately successful Free Gaza Movement voyage which broke Israel's siege of Gaza.

Three claims of responsibility were made, two of them being:

- an anonymous caller, claiming to be from the Palestine Salvation Front because "rejected many times Yasir Arafat's idea to arrange this propaganda trip" - denied by Abdul Hadi al-Nahhad for the Damascus-based group and by the PLO.
- a telephone call received by the Associated Press claimed the attack for the Jewish Defence League

== Israel's responsibility ==
In 2011 the Journalists Dan Margalit, Ronen Bergman published a book, in which they claimed that Israel's Shayetet 13 unit, was responsible for the bombing of the Sol Phryne. And that Israel's Minister of Defence Yoav Gallant was the commander of the operation.

== See also ==
- 2010 Gaza flotilla raid
