= Nuzha Nuseibeh =

Palestinian political and women's rights activist (1926–2013)

- Born: 1926
- Died: 2013 (aged 86–87)
- Spouse: Anwar Nuseibeh
- Children: Munira; Saida; Zaki; Sari; Hatem; Saker
- Parent: Yaqub al-Ghusayn (father)

Nuzha Nuseibeh (née Yacoub Al-Ghussein, 1926-2013), was a Palestinian political and women's rights activist. She helped establish many of the women's institutions in the West Bank and Jerusalem and organised the first civilian protests against Israeli occupation post the June 1967 war. She was the founder of several orphanages and charity schools, as well as the Young Women's Muslim Association.

== Activism ==
With advancing age she dedicated herself increasingly to her women's organisations and charities, notably the YWMA in Jerusalem and Gaza, which she established in 1979 and was president or director of. The YWMA centers provided professional training and taught IT skills, with the Jerusalem branch also operating "a girls' school, a library, and an artisanal production unit".

Her funeral on 22 December 2013 in the Noble Sanctuary in Jerusalem was reported to be the largest funeral Jerusalem had seen since that of her husband who died in 1986. She was made a Knight of Jerusalem in 2010 in recognition of her lifelong dedication to Jerusalem.
