= Nusaybah bint Ka'ab =

Companion (Sahabiyyah) of Muhammad

Naseebah bint Ka'ab نَسِيْبَةُ بِنْتُ كَعْب
- أم عُمارةَ نَسِيبَةُ بنتُ كَعْب
- Died: 634 CE (13 AH); Al-Baqi Cemetery, Medina
- Other name: Umm ʿAmmārah al-Anṣāriyyah
- Parent: Ka'ab
- Relatives: Abdullah bin Ka'ab (brother)
- Family: Banu najar (tribe)

Naseebah bint Ka'ab (Arabic: نَسِيْبَةُ بِنْتُ كَعْب; also ʾUmm ʿAmmarah, Umm Umara), commonly known as Nusaybah bint Ka'ab. Her name is Naseebah bint Kaʿab ibn ʿAmr ibn ʿAwf ibn Mabdhul ibn ʿAmr ibn Ghanm ibn Māzin ibn al-Najjār, and she is the mother of Ḥabīb and ʿAbdullāh, the two sons of Zayd ibn ʿĀṣim.

She was one of the early women to convert to Islam, a sahabiyyah (known in Arabic as Sahaba or companions) of Islamic prophet Muhammad, and a warrior who participated in the battles of Uhud, Hunain, and Yamamah.

When 74 leaders, warriors, and statesmen of Medina descended on al-Aqabah to swear an oath of allegiance to Islam following the teaching of the new religion by Mus`ab ibn `Umair in the city, Naseebah and Umm Munee Asma bint ʿAmr bin 'Adi were the only two women to personally pledge directly to the Islamic prophet Muhammad. The latter's husband, Ghazyah bin ʿAmr, informed Muhammad that the women also wanted to give them their bayʿah in person, and he agreed. She returned to Medina and began teaching Islam to the women of the city. This bayʿah or pledge was in fact handing over power to Muhammad over the city, by its key figures. Her most prominent role came in the Battle of Uhud, where she defended the prophet. She also participated in the battle of Hunain, Yamamah and the Treaty of Hudaybia.

Two of her sons, both later martyrs in battle, were from her first marriage to Zaid bin ʿAsim Mazni. She later married Ghaziyya bin ʿAmr, and had a daughter Khawlah.

== Nusaybah vs Naseebah ==
Although often referenced in some modern contexts as Nusaybah, the more accurate name attributed to this historical figure is Naseebah. In the book Explaining the Harakat of the hard names of narrators, their ancestry, and kunyas (Arabic: توضيح المشتبه في ضبط أسماء الرواة وأنسابهم وألقابهم وكناهم) by the classic scholar of hadith Ibn Nasir Al-Din Al-Dimashqi (ابن ناصر الدين) he mentions the name of Umm 'Ammarah as spelt نَسِيبة بنت كعب (Naseebah bint Kaab) with the name Nusaybah attributed instead to Nusaybah Bint al-Harith (also Umm ʾAtiyyah).

== Battle of al-Yamama ==
She witnessed the Battle of al-Yamama with her son, ʿAbdullah, along with the rest of the Muslims. She fought until her hand was injured, and she was wounded twelve times that day. Between a stab and a blow, she narrated on the authority of Muhammad "If food is eaten in the presence of one who is fasting, the angels send blessings upon him."

== See also ==
- Women in Islam
