= Faisal Husseini =

Palestinian politician (1940–2001)

Faisal Abdel Qader Al-Husseini
- فيصل عبدالقادر الحسيني
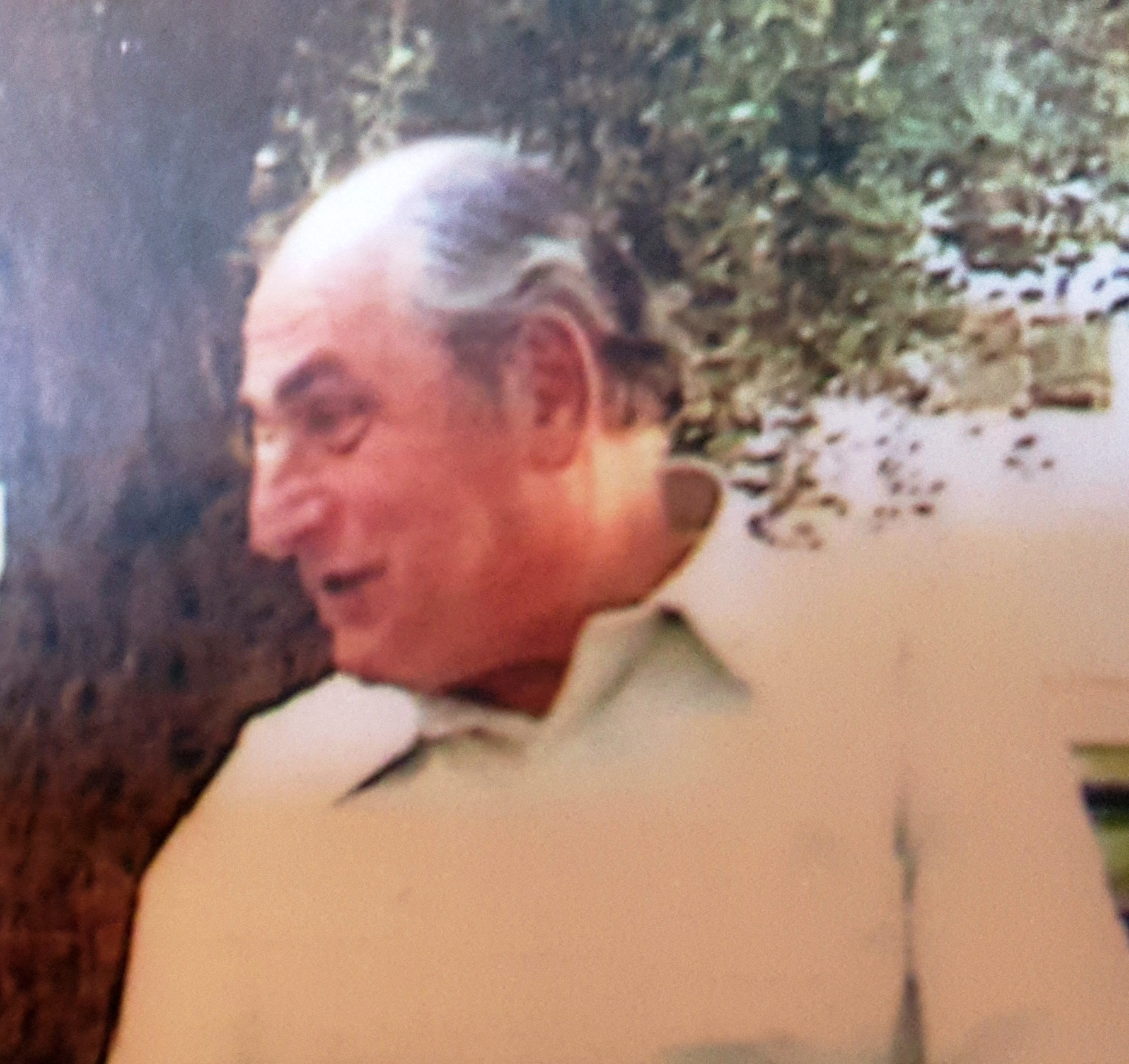

Palestinian Authority Minister for Jerusalem Affairs
- In office ?–?

Palestinian Authority Minister without Portfolio
- In office ?–?

Head of the Fatah faction in the West Bank
- In office ?–?

Advisor to the Palestinian delegation to the Madrid Middle East Peace Conference and subsequent talks
- In office ?–?

Head of the Jerusalem National Council - Palestine
- In office ?–?

Palestinian spokesperson
- In office ?–?

Member of the Supreme Muslim Council in Jerusalem
- In office ?–?

Personal details
- Born: 1940 Baghdad, Kingdom of Iraq
- Died: 31 May 2001 (aged 60) Kuwait
- Resting place: Khātūniyya
- Party: Fatah
- Parent: Abd al-Qadir al-Husayni (father)

Faisal Abdel Qader Al-Husseini (Arabic: فيصل عبدالقادر الحسيني; 17 July 1940 – 31 May 2001) was a Palestinian politician.

== Early life and education ==
Al-Husseini was born in Baghdad, Kingdom of Iraq, son of Abd al-Qadir al-Husayni, commander of local Arab forces during the siege of 1948, grandson of Musa Kazim Pasha Al-Husseini, Mayor of Jerusalem and a relative of Haj Mohammad Amin al-Husayni, the former Grand Mufti of Jerusalem. He studied in Cairo, Baghdad and Damascus. He was a founding member of the General Union of Palestinian Students (GUPS) in 1959.

== Career and activities ==
Al-Husseini went to work for the Palestine Liberation Organization (PLO) upon its establishment in Jerusalem, as deputy manager of the Public Organisation Dept, a post he filled from 1964 to 1965. He later received military training at the Damascus Military College, after which he joined the Palestinian Liberation Army in 1967.

In 1979, Al-Husseini founded and became chairman of the Arab Studies Society. He was also a member of the National Guidance Committee.

Israel, from 1982 to 1987, repeatedly placed him under house and city arrest. He was imprisoned several times from April 1987 to January 1989, but remained active in the First Intifada.

In 1982, he became a member of the Supreme Muslim Council in Jerusalem. Subsequently, he served as a Palestinian spokesperson, head of the Jerusalem National Council/Palestine, an advisor the Palestinian delegation to the Madrid Middle East Peace Conference and subsequent talks, head of the Fatah faction in the West Bank, and Palestinian Authority Minister without Portfolio.

His last post was Palestinian Authority Minister for Jerusalem Affairs for which he was based in East Jerusalem. He died while he was trying to mend relations between the Kuwaiti government and the PLO, which were broken at the time of the 1991 Gulf War.

Al-Husseini was considered a pragmatist by journalists. He taught himself to speak Hebrew and regularly appeared in radio and television shows in Israel to explain the Palestinians' point of view.

== Death ==
Husseini died of a heart attack in Kuwait on 31 May 2001. Following Husseini's death, Israeli police seized his headquarters, the Orient House. Husseini was buried in a family tomb in the Khātūniyya (where his grandfather and his father had also been buried), near the Dome of the Rock, in a funeral attended by thousands.
