= White Paper of 1939 =

British policy paper regarding Palestine

- 1939 White Paper cmd 6019
- Created: May 1939
- Ratified: 23 May 1939
- Purpose: Statement of British policy in Mandatory Palestine

The White Paper of 1939 (Note: Occasionally also known as the MacDonald White Paper (e.g. Caplan, 2015, p.117) after Malcolm MacDonald, the British Colonial Secretary, who presided over its creation.) was a policy paper issued by the British government, led by Neville Chamberlain, in response to the 1936–1939 Arab revolt in Palestine. After its formal approval in the House of Commons on 23 May 1939, (Note: by 268 votes to 179.) it acted as the governing policy for Mandatory Palestine from 1939 to the 1948 British departure. After the war, the Mandate was referred to the United Nations.

The policy, first drafted in March 1939, was prepared by the British government unilaterally as a result of the failure of the Arab–Zionist London Conference. Rejecting the Peel Commission's idea of partitioning Palestine, the paper called for the establishment of an independent Palestine State within 10 years that would share power between Jews and Arabs. It asserted that this would satisfy Britain's obligation to establish a Jewish National Home. The paper also limited Jewish immigration to 75,000 for five years and ruled that further immigration would then be determined by the Arab majority (section II). The High Commissioner was given the authority to establish regulations on the sale of land to non-Arabs (section III). The latter regulations were introduced in 1940 and imposed severe restrictions in all but 5% of Palestine.

The proposal did not meet the political demands proposed by Arab representatives during the London Conference and was officially rejected by the representatives of Palestine Arab parties, who were acting under the influence of Haj Amin al-Husseini. But the National Defence Party represented a more moderate opinion and was prepared to accept the White Paper.

Zionist groups in Palestine immediately rejected the White Paper and led a campaign of attacks on government property that lasted for several months. On 18 May, a Jewish general strike was called.

Regulations on land transfers and clauses restricting immigration were implemented, but at the end of the five years in 1944, only 51,000 of the 75,000 immigration certificates provided for had been used. In light of this, the British offered to allow immigration to continue beyond the cutoff date of 1944, at a rate of 1,500 per month, until the remaining quota was filled. From December 1945 to the 1948 end of the Mandate, 1,500 additional certificates for Jewish immigrants were allocated each month. Key provisions were ultimately never to be implemented, initially because of cabinet opposition after the change in government and later because of preoccupation with World War II.

== Background ==
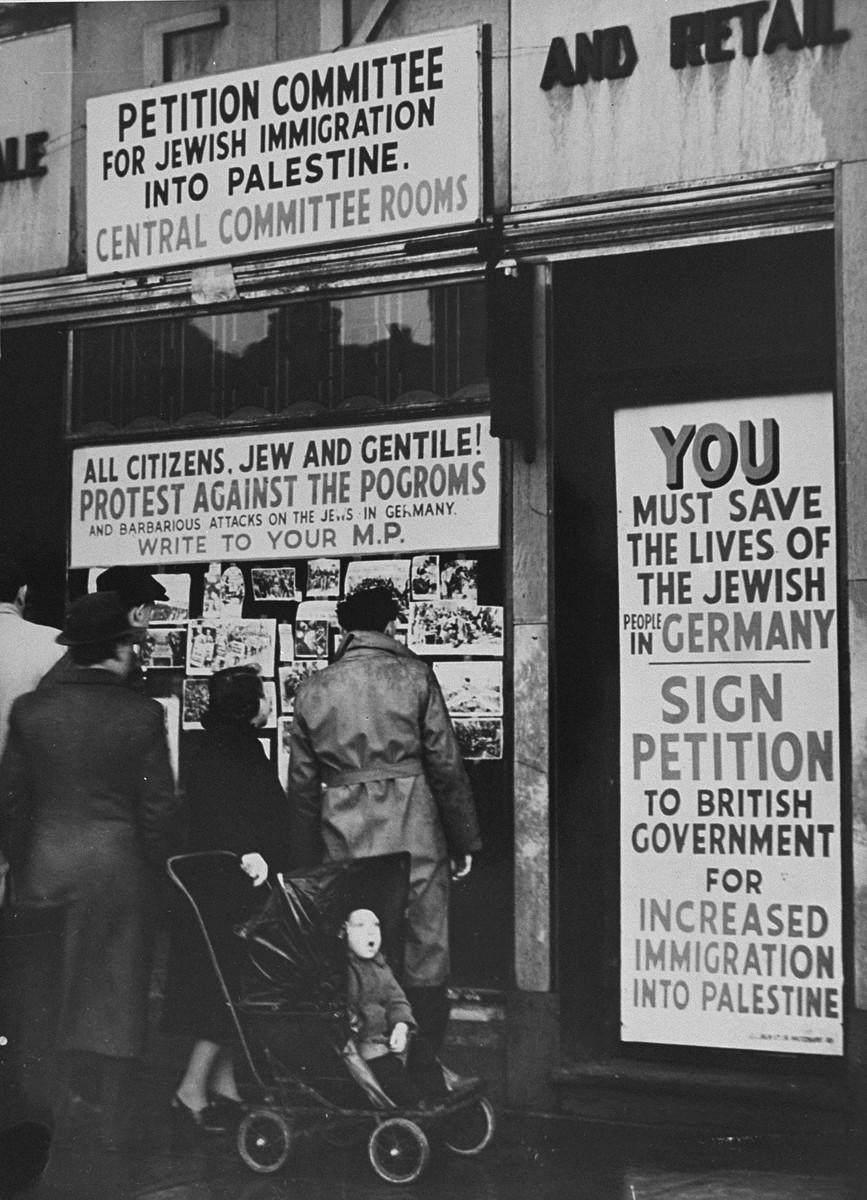
British Jews protest against immigration restrictions to Palestine after Kristallnacht, November 1938

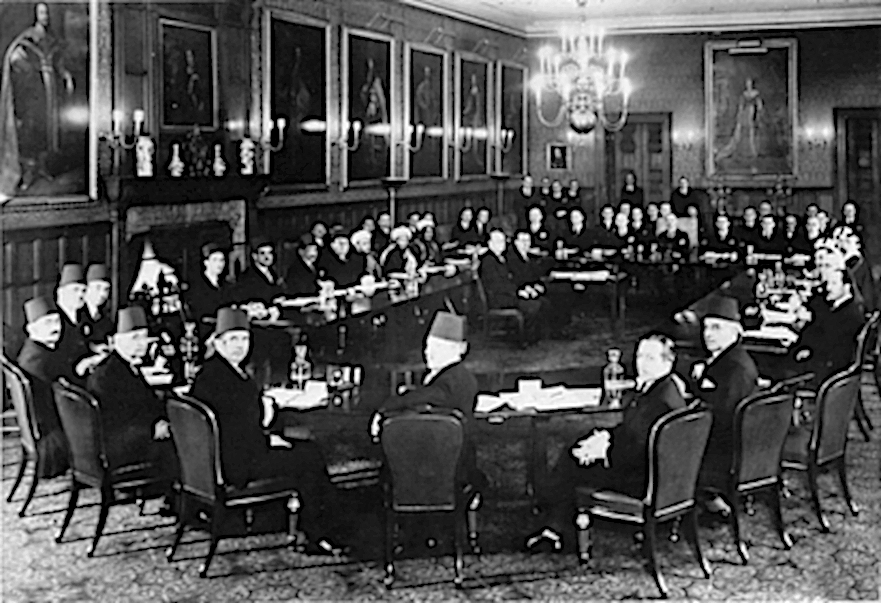
London Conference, St. James's Palace, February 1939. Arab Palestinian delegates (foreground), left to right: Fu'ad Saba, Yaqub Al-Ghussein, Musa Al-Alami, Amin Tamimi, Jamal Al-Husseini, Awni Abdul Hadi, George Antonious and Alfred Roch. Facing the Arab Palestinians are the British, with Sir Neville Chamberlain presiding. To his right is Lord Halifax and to his left Malcolm MacDonald.

During World War I, the British had made two promises regarding territory in the Middle East. Britain had promised the Hashemite governors of Arabia, through Lawrence of Arabia and the McMahon–Hussein correspondence, independence for a united Arab country in Syria in exchange for supporting the British against the Ottoman Empire. The Ottoman Caliphate had declared a military jihad for the Germans, and the British hoped that an alliance with the Arabs would quell chances of a general Muslim uprising in British-held territories in Africa, India and the Far East. Britain had also negotiated the Sykes–Picot Agreement to partition the Middle East between Britain and France.

A variety of strategic factors, such as securing Jewish support in Eastern Europe while the Russian front collapsed, culminated in the 1917 Balfour Declaration in which Britain promised to create and foster a Jewish national home in Palestine. The broad delineations of territory and goals for both the creation of a Jewish homeland in Palestine and Arab self-determination were approved in the San Remo Conference.

In June 1922, the League of Nations approved the Palestine Mandate, effective September 1923, an explicit document on Britain's responsibilities and powers of administration in Palestine, including 'secur[ing] the establishment of the Jewish national home', and 'safeguarding the civil and religious rights of all the inhabitants of Palestine'. In September 1922, the British government presented the Trans-Jordan memorandum to the League of Nations that stated that the Emirate of Transjordan would be excluded from all the provisions dealing with Jewish settlement, in accordance with Article 25 of the Mandate. The memorandum was approved on 23 September. Stiff Arab opposition and pressure against Jewish immigration made Britain redefine Jewish immigration by restricting its flow according to the country's economic capacity to absorb the immigrants. In effect, annual quotas were put in place as to how many Jews could immigrate, but Jews possessing a large sum of money (£500) were allowed to enter the country freely.

Following Adolf Hitler's rise to power, European Jews were increasingly prepared to spend the money necessary to enter Palestine. The 1935 Nuremberg Laws stripped the 500,000 German Jews of their citizenship. Jewish migration was impeded by Nazi restrictions on the transfer of finances abroad (departing Jews had to abandon their property), but the Jewish Agency for Israel was able to negotiate an agreement that allowed Jews resident in Germany to buy German goods for export to Palestine, thus circumventing the restrictions.

The large numbers of Jews entering Palestine was a cause of the 1936–1939 Arab revolt in Palestine. Britain responded to the revolt by appointing a royal commission, the Peel Commission, which went to Palestine and undertook a thorough study of the issues. The Peel Commission recommended in 1937 for Palestine to be partitioned into two states: one Arab the other Jewish. The proposal was rejected by the Arabs while the Zionist response was "neither positive nor negative" and the Peel Commission failed to stem the violence. In January 1938, the Woodhead Commission explored the practicalities of partition and considered three different plans, one of which was based on the Peel Plan. Reporting in 1938, the Woodhead Commission rejected the plan, primarily on the grounds that it could not be implemented without a massive forced transfer of Arabs, an option that the British government had already ruled out. With dissent from some of its members, the Commission instead recommended a plan that would leave the Galilee under British mandate, but it emphasised serious problems with it such as a lack of financial self-sufficiency of the proposed Arab state. The British government accompanied the publication of the Woodhead Report by a statement of policy rejecting partition as impracticable for "political, administrative and financial difficulties". It proposed a substantially smaller Jewish state, including the coastal plain only. The Évian Conference, convened by the United States in July 1938, failed to find any agreement to deal with the rapidly growing number of Jewish refugees, increasing pressure on the British to find a solution to the problem of Jewish immigration to Palestine.

=== London Conference ===
In February 1939, the British called the London Conference to negotiate an agreement between Arabs and Jews in Palestine. The Arab delegates attended on the condition that they would not meet directly with the Jewish representatives, which would constitute recognition of Jewish claims over Palestine. The British government, therefore, held separate meetings with the two sides. The conference ended in failure on 17 March.

In the wake of World War II, the British believed that Jewish support was either guaranteed or unimportant. However, the government feared hostility from the Arab world. That geopolitical consideration was, in Raul Hilberg's word, "decisive" to British policies since Egypt, Iraq and Saudi Arabia were independent and allied with Britain.

== Content ==
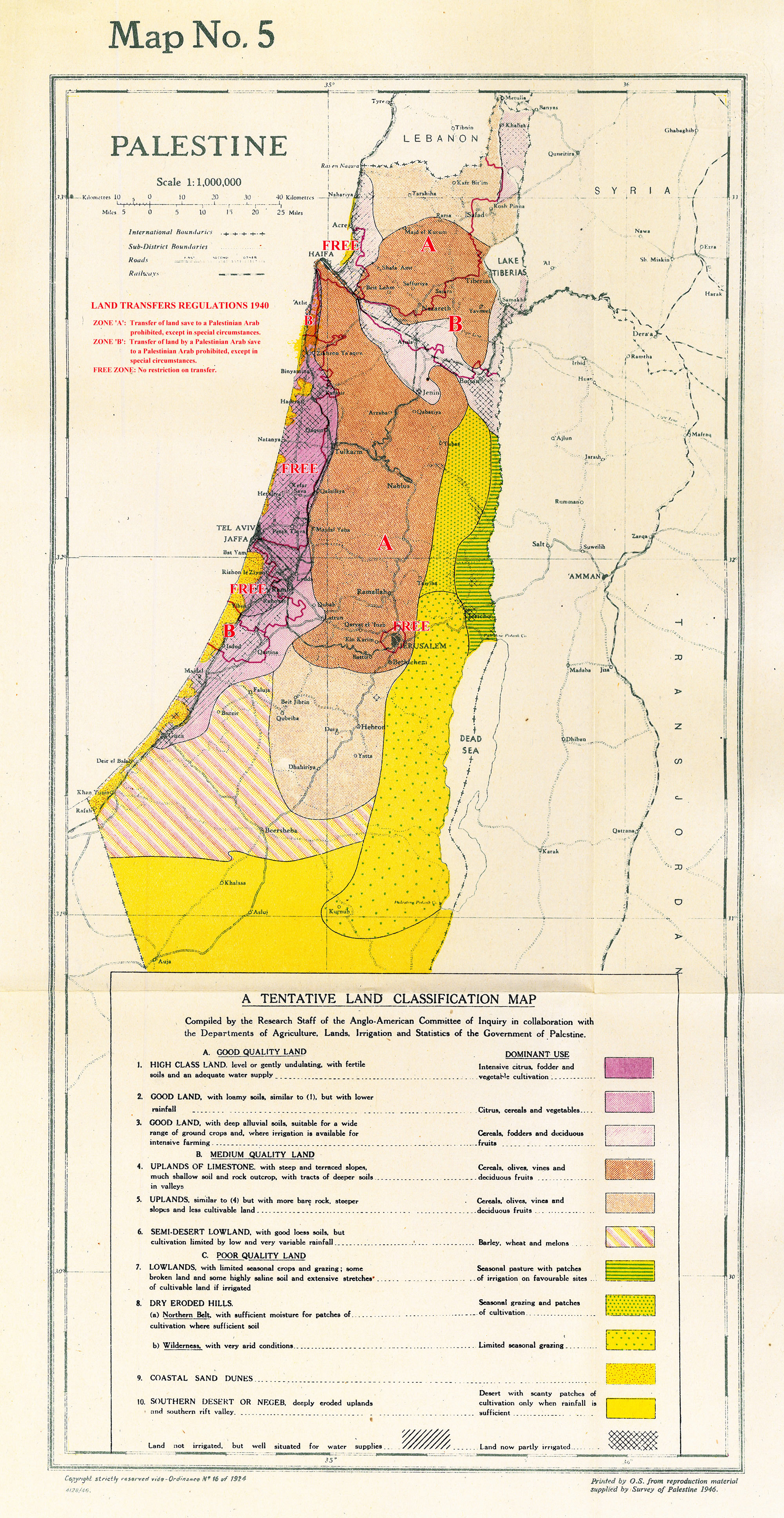
Land classification and boundaries of land transfer regions as prescribed in 1940.

These were the main points of the White Paper:

=== Section I. The Constitution ===
It stated that with over 450,000 Jews having now settled in the mandate, the Balfour Declaration about "a national home for the Jewish people" had been met, and it also called for an independent Palestine to be established within 10 years and to be governed jointly by Arabs and Jews:

His Majesty's Government believe that the framers of the Mandate in which the Balfour Declaration was embodied could not have intended that Palestine should be converted into a Jewish State against the will of the Arab population of the country. [ ... ] His Majesty's Government therefore now declare unequivocally that it is not part of their policy that Palestine should become a Jewish State. They would indeed regard it as contrary to their obligations to the Arabs under the Mandate, as well as to the assurances which have been given to the Arab people in the past, that the Arab population of Palestine should be made the subjects of a Jewish State against their will.

The objective of His Majesty's Government is the establishment within 10 years of an independent Palestine State in such treaty relations with the United Kingdom as will provide satisfactorily for the commercial and strategic requirements of both countries in the future. [..] The independent State should be one in which Arabs and Jews share government in such a way as to ensure that the essential interests of each community are safeguarded.

=== Section II. Immigration ===
Jewish immigration to Palestine under the British Mandate was to be limited to 75,000 over the next five years and then would depend on Arab consent:

His Majesty's Government do not [..] find anything in the Mandate or in subsequent Statements of Policy to support the view that the establishment of a Jewish National Home in Palestine cannot be effected unless immigration is allowed to continue indefinitely. If immigration has an adverse effect on the economic position in the country, it should clearly be restricted; and equally, if it has a seriously damaging effect on the political position in the country, that is a factor that should not be ignored. Although it is not difficult to contend that the large number of Jewish immigrants who have been admitted so far have been absorbed economically, the fear of the Arabs that this influx will continue indefinitely until the Jewish population is in a position to dominate them has produced consequences which are extremely grave for Jews and Arabs alike and for the peace and prosperity of Palestine. The lamentable disturbances of the past three years are only the latest and most sustained manifestation of this intense Arab apprehension [ ... ] it cannot be denied that fear of indefinite Jewish immigration is widespread amongst the Arab population and that this fear has made possible disturbances which have given a serious setback to economic progress, depleted the Palestine exchequer, rendered life and property insecure, and produced a bitterness between the Arab and Jewish populations which is deplorable between citizens of the same country. If in these circumstances immigration is continued up to the economic absorptive capacity of the country, regardless of all other considerations, a fatal enmity between the two peoples will be perpetuated, and the situation in Palestine may become a permanent source of friction amongst all peoples in the Near and Middle East.

Jewish immigration during the next five years will be at a rate which, if economic absorptive capacity permits, will bring the Jewish population up to approximately one third of the total population of the country. Taking into account the expected natural increase of the Arab and Jewish populations, and the number of illegal Jewish immigrants now in the country, this would allow of the admission, as from the beginning of April this year, of some 75,000 immigrants over the next four years. These immigrants would, subject to the criterion of economic absorptive capacity, be admitted as follows: For each of the next five years a quota of 10,000 Jewish immigrants will be allowed on the understanding that a shortage one year may be added to the quotas for subsequent years, within the five-year period, if economic absorptive capacity permits. In addition, as a contribution towards the solution of the Jewish refugee problem, 25,000 refugees will be admitted as soon as the High Commissioner is satisfied that adequate provision for their maintenance is ensured, special consideration being given to refugee children and dependents. The existing machinery for ascertaining economic absorptive capacity will be retained, and the High Commissioner will have the ultimate responsibility for deciding the limits of economic capacity. Before each periodic decision is taken, Jewish and Arab representatives will be consulted. After the period of five years, no further Jewish immigration will be permitted unless the Arabs of Palestine are prepared to acquiesce in it.

=== Section III. Land ===
No restriction had been imposed on the transfer of land from Arabs to Jews, but the White Paper now stated:

The Reports of several expert Commissions have indicated that, owing to the natural growth of the Arab population and the steady sale in recent years of Arab land to Jews, there is now in certain areas no room for further transfers of Arab land, whilst in some other areas such transfers of land must be restricted if Arab cultivators are to maintain their existing standard of life and a considerable landless Arab population is not soon to be created. In these circumstances, the High Commissioner will be given general powers to prohibit and regulate transfers of land.

== Reactions ==
=== Parliamentary approval ===
On 22 May 1939, the House of Commons debated a motion that the White Paper was inconsistent with the terms of the Mandate, but it was defeated by 268 votes to 179. The following day, the House of Lords accepted the new policy without a vote.

During the debate, Lloyd George called the White Paper an "act of perfidy", and Winston Churchill voted against his party although it was in the government. The Liberal MP James Rothschild stated during the parliamentary debate that "for the majority of the Jews who go to Palestine it is a question of migration or of physical extinction".

Some supporters of the government were opposed to the policy on the grounds that it appeared in their view to contradict the Balfour Declaration. Several government MPs voted against the proposals or abstained, including Cabinet Ministers such as the illustrious Jewish Secretary of State for War Leslie Hore-Belisha.

=== League of Nations ===
The Permanent Mandates Commission unanimously held that the White Paper was in conflict with the interpretation that the Mandatory Government, with the concurrence of the organs of the League, had put upon the mandate in the past. Four of the members felt that the policy was not in harmony with the terms of the Mandate, and the other three held that existing circumstances would justify the policy if the Council of the League of Nations did not oppose it. The outbreak of the Second World War suspended any further deliberations.

=== Arab reactions ===
The Arab Higher Committee initially argued that the independence of a future Palestine government would prove to be illusory since the Jews could prevent its functioning by withholding participation, and in any case, real authority would still be in the hands of British officials. The limitations on Jewish immigration were also held to be insufficient since there was no guarantee immigration would not resume after five years. In place of the policy enunciated in the White Paper, the Arab Higher Committee called for "a complete and final prohibition" of Jewish immigration and a repudiation of the Jewish national home policy altogether.

In June 1939, Hajj Amin al-Husayni initially "astonished" the other members of the Arab Higher Committee by turning down the White Paper. According to Benny Morris, the reason that the advantageous proposal was turned down was entirely selfish: "it did not place him at the helm of the future Palestinian state."

In July 1940, after two weeks of meetings with the British representative, S. F. Newcombe, the leader of the Palestinian Arab delegates to the London Conference, Jamal al-Husseini and fellow delegate Musa al-Alami, agreed to the terms of the White Paper, and both signed a copy of it in the presence of the prime minister of Iraq, Nuri as-Said.

=== Zionist reactions ===
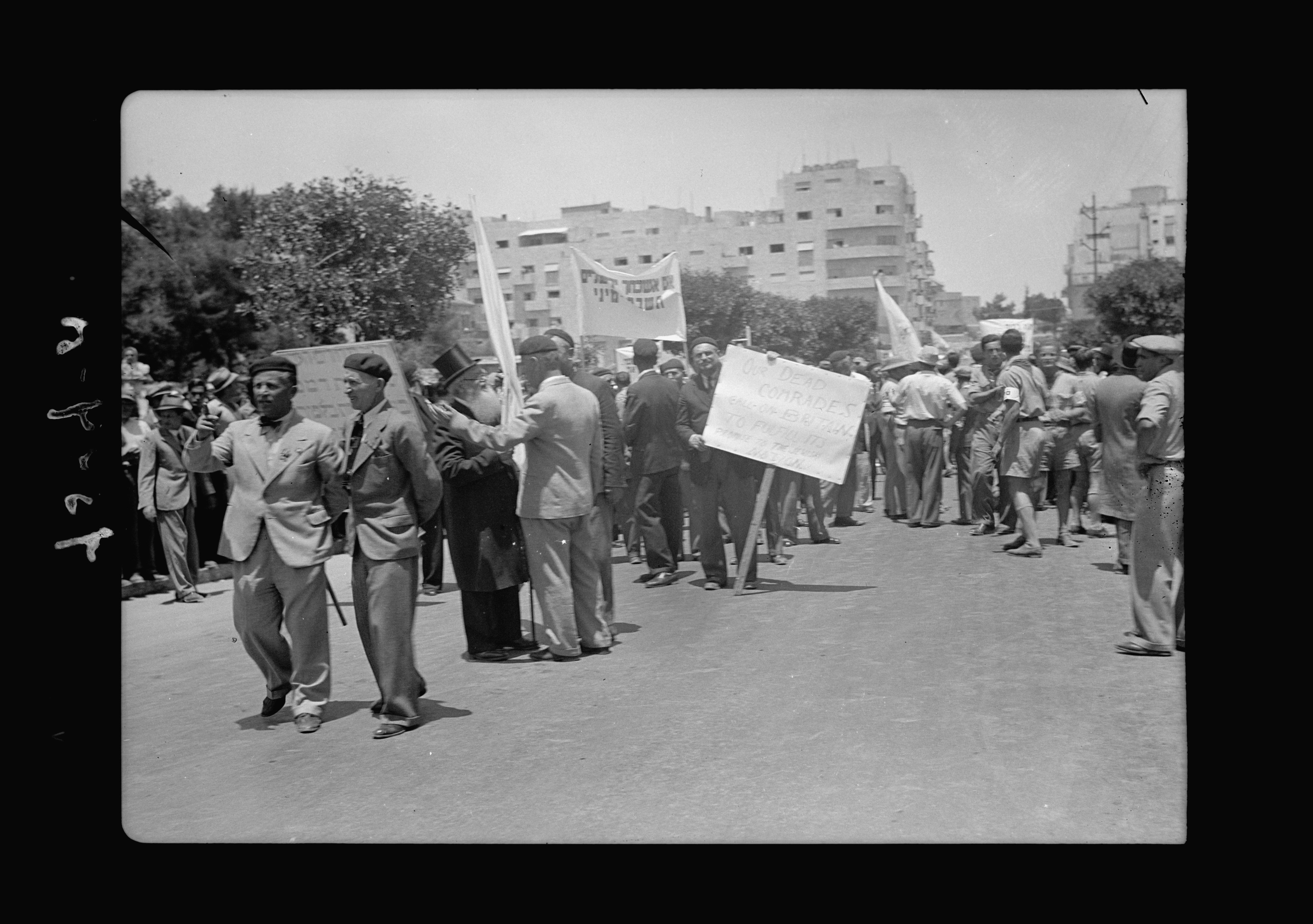
Jewish Legion veterans demonstrating in Tel Aviv, 18 May 1939.

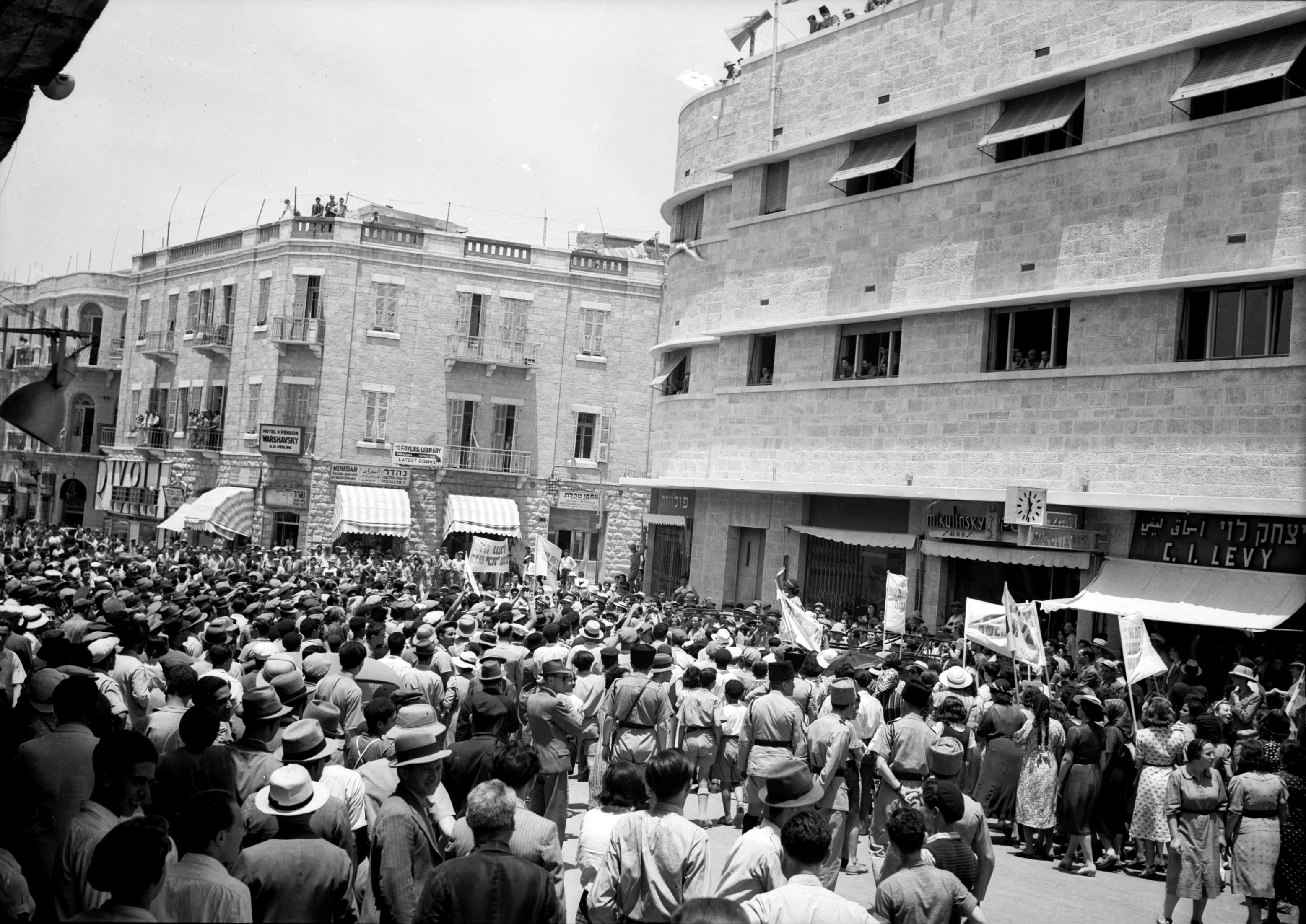
Jewish demonstration against the White Paper in Jerusalem, 22 May 1939

Zionist groups in Palestine immediately rejected the White Paper and began a campaign of attacks on government property and Arab civilians, which lasted for several months. On 18 May, a Jewish general strike was called.

On 27 February 1939, in response to enthusiastic Arab demonstrations after reports that the British were proposing to allow independence to Palestine on the same terms as Iraq, a co-ordinated Irgun bombing campaign across the country killed 38 Arabs and wounded 44.

In response to the White Paper, the right-wing Zionist militant group Irgun began formulating plans for a rebellion to evict the British and to establish an independent Jewish state. Ze'ev Jabotinsky, the founder of Irgun, who had been exiled from Palestine by the British, proposed a plan for a revolt to take place in October 1939, which he sent to the Irgun High Command in six coded letters. Jabotinsky's plan, he and other "illegals" would start by arriving in Palestine by boat. Then, the Irgun would help him and the other passengers escape. Next, the Irgun would raid and occupy Government House and other British centres of power in Palestine, raise the Jewish national flag and hold them for at least 24 hours, even at a heavy cost. Simultaneously, Zionist leaders in Western Europe and the United States would proclaim an independent Jewish state in Palestine and function as a government-in-exile. Irgun seriously considered carrying out the plan but was concerned over the heavy losses that would be inevitable. Irgun leader Avraham Stern, who would later break from Irgun to form Lehi, formed a plan for 40,000 armed Jewish fighters recruited in Europe to sail to Palestine and join the rebellion. The Polish government supported his plan and began training Irgun members and setting aside weaponry for 10,000 men for a proposed invasion of Palestine in April 1940. However, the outbreak of World War II in September 1939 quickly put an end to those plans.

After the outbreak of war in September 1939, the head of the Jewish Agency for Palestine, David Ben-Gurion declared, “we must help the [British] army as if there were no White Paper, and we must fight the White Paper as if there were no war.”

== Aftermath ==
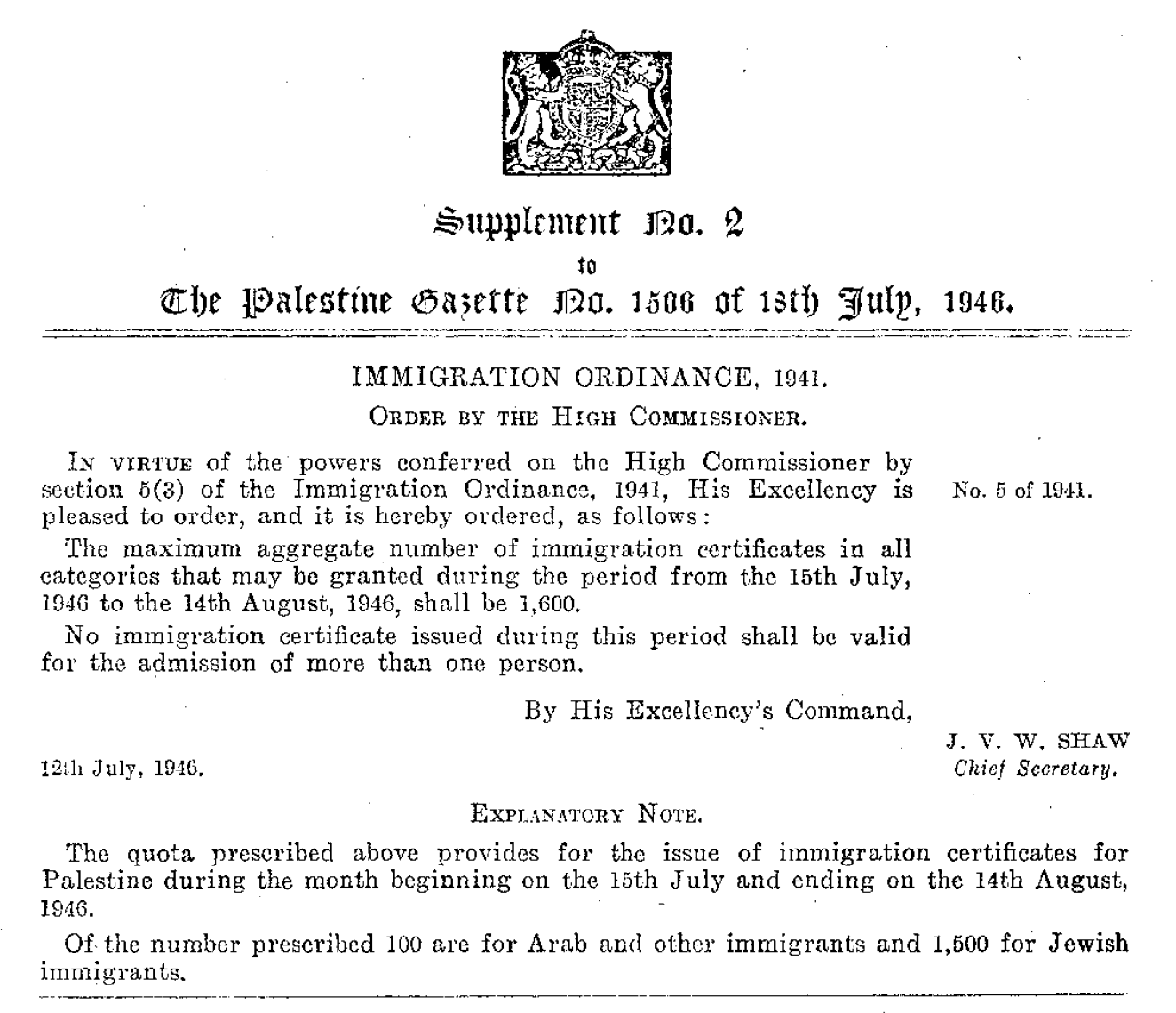
Immigration certificates for Jul–Aug 1946; 1,500 for Jews, 100 for Arabs.

On 13 July, the authorities announced the suspension of all Jewish immigration into Palestine until March 1940. The reason given was the increase in the number of illegal immigrants.

In March 1940, the British High Commissioner for Palestine issued an edict dividing Palestine into three zones:

In Zone A, consisting of about 63 percent of the country including the stony hills, land transfers save to a Palestinian Arab were in general forbidden. In Zone B. consisting of about 32 percent of the country, transfers from a Palestinian Arab save to another Palestinian Arab were severely restricted at the discretion of the High Commissioner. In the remainder of Palestine, consisting of about five percent of the country-which, however, includes the most fertile areas—land sales remained unrestricted.

In December 1942, when the extermination of the Jews became public knowledge, there were 34,000 immigration certificates remaining. In February 1943, the British government announced that the remaining certificates could be used as soon as practicable to rescue Jewish children from Southeastern Europe, particularly Bulgaria. This plan was partly successful, but many of those who received certificates were not able to emigrate although those in Bulgaria survived. In July, it was announced that any Jewish refugee who reached a neutral country in transit would be given clearance for Palestine. During 1943 about half the remaining certificates were distributed, and by the end of the war, there were 3,000 certificates left.

At the end of World War II, the British Labour Party conference voted to rescind the White Paper and to establish a Jewish state in Palestine, but the party's Foreign Minister, Ernest Bevin, persisted with the policy, which remained in effect until the May 1948 British departure from Palestine.

After the war, the determination of Holocaust survivors to reach Palestine led to large scale illegal Jewish migration to Palestine. British efforts to block the migration led to violent resistance by the Zionist underground.

Illegal immigrants detained by the British Government were interned in camps on Cyprus. The immigrants had no citizenship and could not be returned to any country. Those interned included a large number of children and orphans.

Immigration statistics compiled in December 1945 indicated that the White Paper allowance had been exceeded by 790 persons when illegal immigrants were included. On 31 January 1946, the High Commissioner announced:

It will be recalled that in the Statement of the Secretary of State for Foreign Affairs of 13 November 1945, it was made clear that His Majesty's Government could not divest themselves of the duties and responsibilities under the Mandate while the Mandate continued. They therefore proposed that they would consult with the Arabs with a view to an arrangement which would ensure that pending the receipt of the interim recommendations of the [Anglo-American] Committee of Inquiry there would be no interruption of Jewish immigration at the present monthly rate. These consultations with the Arabs have been proceeding over a long period and have reached no conclusive result. In these circumstances His Majesty's Government have now decided for cogent reasons that they must allow immigration to continue provisionally at the proposed rate of 1,500 a month. Preference will be given to those European Jews who have a special claim such as those to whom the Palestine Government have already undertaken obligations, and relatives in Europe of Jews already established in Palestine. Illegal immigrants will of course, continue to be deducted from quotas.

The quota of 1,500 certificates for Jewish immigrants per month continued until the end of the mandate.

The Provisional Council of Israel's first constitutional act was a Proclamation that "All legislation resulting from the British Government's White Paper of May 1939, will at midnight tonight become null and void. This includes the immigration provisions as well as the land transfer regulations of February 1940."

== See also ==
- Churchill White Paper (1922)
- Passfield white paper (1930)

== Bibliography ==
- Khalaf, Issa (1991). Politics in Palestine: Arab Factionalism and Social Disintegration, 1939–1948. SUNY series in the social and economic history of the Middle East. Albany: State University of New York Press. ISBN 978-0-7914-0707-3.
- Hurewitz, Jacob C. (1968). The Struggle for Palestine. New York/N.Y: Greenwood Press. ISBN 978-0-8371-0111-8.
- Caplan, Neil (2015). Futile Diplomacy. Vol. 2: Arab-Zionist Negotiations and the End of the Mandate. Florence: Taylor and Francis. ISBN 978-1-138-90523-8.
- Cohen, Michael J. (2014). Britain's Moment in Palestine: Retrospect and Perspectives, 1917-1948. Israeli History, Politics and Society. Hoboken: Taylor and Francis. ISBN 978-1-317-91364-1.
- Kessler, Oren (2023). Palestine 1936: The Great Revolt and the Roots of the Middle East Conflict. Lanham (Md.): Rowman & Littlefield. ISBN 978-1-5381-4880-8.
