= Musa Alami =

Palestinian nationalist and politician (1897–1984)

- موسى العلمي
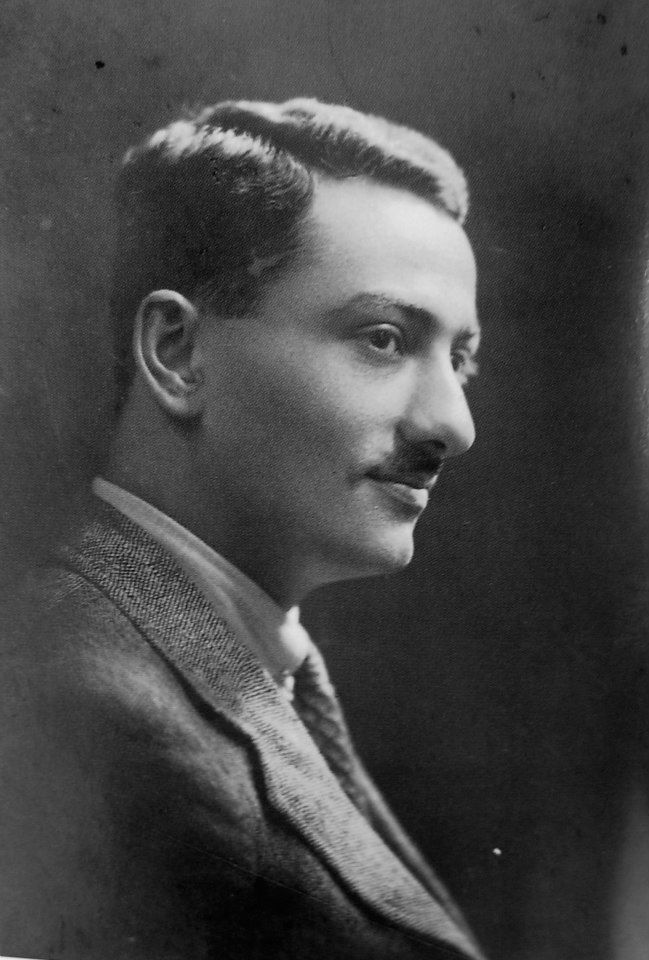
- Musa al-Alami in 1918

Founder and Chairman of the Arab Development Society
- In office 1952–?

Private secretary to the High Commissioner of Palestine
- In office ?–?

Personal details
- Born: 3 May 1897 Jerusalem, Ottoman Empire
- Died: 8 June 1984 (aged 87) Amman, Jordan
- Occupation: Politician; entrepreneur; philanthropist

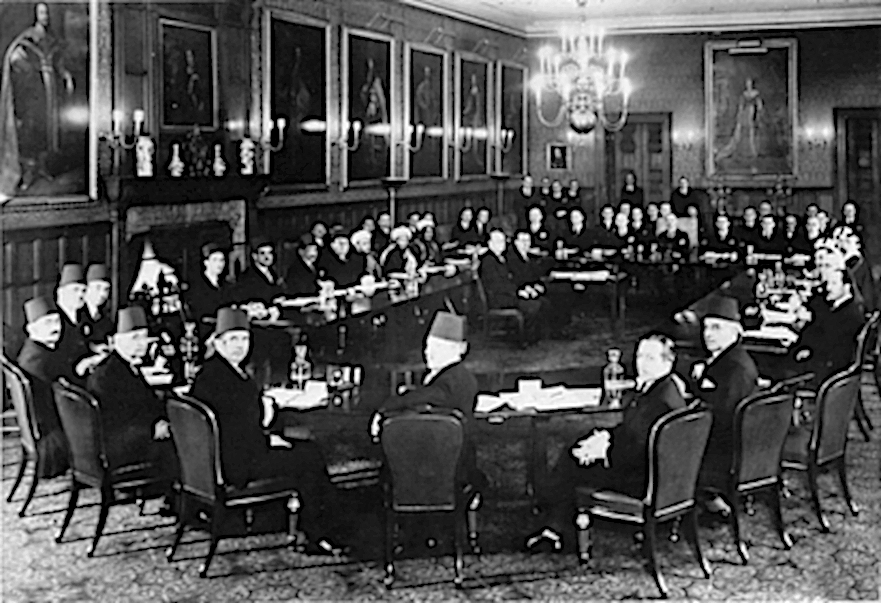
London Conference, St. James' Palace, February 1939. Palestinian delegates (foreground), left to right: Fu'ad Saba, Yaqub Al-Ghussein, Musa Alami, Amin Tamimi, Jamal Al-Husseini, Awni Abdul Hadi, George Antonious, and Alfred Roch. Facing the Palestinians are the British, with Sir Neville Chamberlain presiding. To his right is Lord Halifax and to his left, Malcolm MacDonald

Musa Alami (3 May 1897 – 8 June 1984) Arabic: موسى العلمي, romanized: Müsə al-'Alāmi) was a Palestinian nationalist politician. Due to Alami having represented Palestine at various Arab conferences, in the 1940s, he was viewed by many as the leader of the Palestinian Arabs.

== Biography ==
=== Early life and political career ===
Alami was born in the Musrara neighbourhood of Jerusalem into a prominent family. His father was Mayor of Jerusalem Faidi al-Alami, his sister was married to Jamal al-Hussayni, and he was the uncle of Serene Husseini Shahid.

Alami was first taught at the school of the American Colony and at the French École des Frères in Jaffa. During World War I, he worked at the censorship office in Damascus. Alami retained a positive view of the Ottoman Empire, recalling that the Arabs regarded the Turks as partners rather than oppressors, and above all, that Palestine was largely ruled by Palestinian officials. Alami claimed that "a greater degree of freedom and self-government existed in Palestine than in many Turkish provinces".

Later, he studied law at Cambridge University and was admitted to the Inner Temple and graduated with honours.

Upon his return to Jerusalem, Alami worked for the legal department of the government of the British Mandate of Palestine and eventually became the private secretary of the High Commissioner General Arthur Grenfell Wauchope. In 1934, Alami participated in talks with the leaders of the Jewish community in Palestine David Ben-Gurion and Moshe Sharett. Alami told Ben-Gurion that the most the Jews could expect would be a Jewish enclave around Tel Aviv in a Muslim Palestine. According to Ben-Gurion, he told Alami that Zionist efforts could provide significant help developing Palestine for all its inhabitants, but Alami replied that he would prefer to leave the land poor and desolate for another hundred years until the Arabs could develop it themselves.

Alami was ousted from his government position as legal adviser by the British authorities and went into exile in Beirut, and later Baghdad. He played an important role in the St. James Conference, negotiations with the British government in London in 1938–1939. He was a major contributor to the White Paper of 1939.

Former British diplomat G. Furlonge, who was the author of Alami's biography, described the political scene in Jerusalem after the establishment of Israel in 1948: "The new [Palestinian] leaders were a set of young men of some education, all of them in the traumatic condition induced by the consciousness of having suffered a resounding defeat at the hand of an enemy whom they had heartily despised."

Alami founded and headed the Arab Office, which presented to the Anglo-American Committee of Inquiry. According to historical evidence provided by Rashid Khalidi as well as firsthand accounts of Walid Khalidi and Hussein Khalidi, Alami was known for "high-handedness [which] alienated colleagues. By 1947, he and Hussein Khalidi "were no longer allies". Alami was also known for "closeness to the pro-British Iraqi regime", which "provoked the suspicions of many Palestinian figures".

Alami sold land to Zionists for the establishment of Tirat Zvi in the Beit She'an Valley.

=== Arab Development Society ===
After the 1948 Arab-Israeli War, Alami lost most of his property in Jerusalem and the Galilee and went to live near Jericho, where he acquired a concession of 5,000 acres (20 km^{2}) of desert from the Jordanian government. In 1952, he founded the Arab Development Society (ADS) to help Jericho's refugees. After discovering water in the desert, he founded a large farm and school for refugee children. Alami raised funds in order to build villages for the refugees and launched an agricultural farm whose produce was exported.

The farm prospered between 1951 and 1955, wells were dug, canals were built, and it raised agricultural crops. Palestinian refugees worked there and made a living from it. A swimming pool, a clinic, a school, and a residence for hundreds of orphans were built next to it. In December 1954, Jordanian intelligence learned that Amin al-Husseini was planning to assassinate Alami. During this period, the rehabilitation of refugees was considered a betrayal of the idea of preserving the right of return and fixing the refugee situation, and Alami was presented as a traitor. In December 1955, as part of riots against the Jordanian government, a mob invaded the farm, destroyed, and burned it.

After several months, the farm was rehabilitated, thanks in part to donations collected by Alami in the United States. During the Six Day War, Alami was on a fundraising campaign in London. After the war, Israel invited him to return to Jericho and requested the farm's continued operation. At the beginning of 1968, about 125 people worked and studied there. In May 1969, the farm was shelled twice by cannons fired from across the eastern Jordan River.

According to David Gilmour, who interviewed Alami in February 1979 in Jericho:

Both the farm and the school were highly successful until the Israeli invasion in 1967, when two-thirds of the land was laid waste and twenty-six of the twenty-seven wells destroyed. The Israeli army systematically smashed the irrigation system, the buildings and the well-boring machinery. Most of the land quickly reverted to desert.

Perhaps some of the destruction was unavoidable in wartime but what seems utterly callous and outrageous is the way Israeli authorities have behaved since 1967. A chunk of land was predictably wired off for "security reasons" and turned into a military camp. It is now deserted, [...] the Israelis refused to allow him to buy the necessary equipment either to restore the damaged wells or to drill new ones. So he made some manual repairs to four of the least damaged wells and with these he was able to salvage a fraction of the land and keep the farm and the school functioning. ...[The Israelis] are now telling him that he has too much water – though he has less than a fifth of what he used to have – and have warned him that they will be fixing a limit on his consumption and will be taking away the surplus for their own "projects" (i.e. their expanding settlements near Jericho).

...[Alami] laughs at President Carter's obsession with human rights because he knows they will never be observed in Palestine. "Liberty and justice are meaningless words for my people and my country. We have never known either." He waves towards his farm, a philanthropist's dream that was once brilliantly successful. "I gain no pleasure from this place now," he says, "I stay here out of duty. I know the Zionists have been wanting to get rid of us for years. They want me to go and have told me so. They want to build a kibbutz here. But I have a duty to keep going, a duty to my people."

=== Views on the Nakba ===
In an opinion article published in 1949, Alami gave his assessment of the "great national disaster" suffered by the Arabs of Palestine:

- "[T]he British were the prime causers of the disaster, and on them lies its responsibility. They were assisted by the Americans and the Russians. So much is clear. At all events, we found ourselves face to face with the Jews, and entered into battle with them to decide the future; and in spite of what the British, the Americans, and the Russians had done, it was still within our power to win the fight."
- "There were two phases to the battle of Palestine. ... In the first phase the fundamental source of our weakness was that we were unprepared even though not taken by surprise, while the Jews were fully prepared. ... These same weaknesses were the source of weakness in our defense in the second phase, that of the Arab armies: disunity, lack of a unified command, improvisation, diversity of plans, and on top of all a slackness and lack of seriousness in winning the war."
- "The evacuation and homelessness of the Arabs was planned and intended by the Jews."
- "In the social sphere, the incompetence of the Arab governments has revealed itself in the matter of the refugees. ... It is shameful that the Arab governments should prevent the Arab refugees from working in their countries and shut the doors in their faces and imprison them in camps."
- "With the establishment of a Jewish foothold and base, the Arabs are faced with a new danger. The ambitions of the Jews are not limited to Palestine alone, but embrace other parts of the Arab world. ... The next step will be an attempt to take all of Palestine, and then they will proceed according to circumstances – circumstances which they themselves will attempt to create."

=== Political views ===
Alami wrote about freedom of speech, equal opportunities for work and education, the relationship between government and individual labor, social security, social service, and women's rights.

=== Personal life ===
Alami was married to Sadia Jabri, and the couple later divorced.

=== Death ===
Musa Alami died in Amman on 8 June 1984 as a result of circulatory collapse. His funeral took place in the Al-Aqsa Mosque. The Israel Defense Forces crossing on the eastern exit of Jericho, through which Palestinians traveling to Jordan via the Allenby Bridge pass, is named after him. The site of the farm that Alami built is still commonly known as "the Musa Alami farm".
