= Youth Congress Party =

Youth Congress Party Arabic: مؤتمر الشباب العربي
- Founder: Yaqub al-Ghusayn
- Founded: 1932
- Ideology: Arab nationalism

The Youth Congress Party was a Palestinian political party that was established by Yaqub al-Ghusayn. It was formed in 1932 in the British Mandate of Palestine and quickly grew to become the largest nationalist association of the early 1930s, counting several thousand members by mid-1934 in branches across the country. The party rejected British rule and was generally pro-Husayni.

The party's membership came mainly from Jaffa and Ramleh.

== See also ==
- Independence Party (Mandatory Palestine)
