= Intissar al-Wazir =

Palestinian former minister (born 1941)

- انتصار الوزير
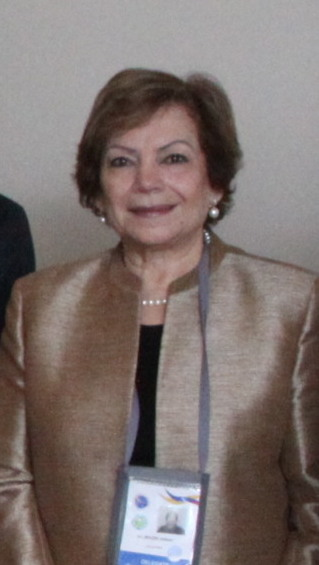
- Al-Wazir in March 2013

Member of the Palestinian Legislative Council
- Incumbent
- Assumed office 1996

Minister of Social Affairs
- In office 5 March 1994 – 24 February 2005
- President: Yasser Arafat; Rawhi Fattouh (acting); Mahmoud Abbas
- Prime Minister: Mahmoud Abbas; Ahmed Qurei
- Preceded by: Awni Abd al-Hadi (1948)
- Succeeded by: Hasan Abu-Libdeh

Personal details
- Born: 12 December 1941 (age 84) Gaza, Mandatory Palestine
- Party: Fatah
- Spouse: Khalil al-Wazir
- Children: 5, including Jihad
- Education: Damascus University (BA)
- Occupation: Politician
- Nickname: Umm Jihad

Intissar al-Wazir (Arabic: انتصار الوزير; born 1941), also known by the kunya Umm Jihad (أم جهاد), is a Palestinian politician, a member of the Palestinian Legislative Council and a former Minister of Social Affairs of the Palestinian National Authority. Her husband was Khalil al-Wazir, a senior figure of the Palestine Liberation Organization who was assassinated by Israel in 1988. She joined the Fatah organization in 1959, becoming the party's first female member. She has a bachelor's degree in history from Damascus University.

== Biography ==
Al-Wazir was born in Gaza. She helped found the General Union of Palestinian Women, an organization that focuses on the social, economic and legal status of Palestinian women.

She has been a member of the Palestinian National Council since 1974 and a member of the Fatah-Central Committee since 1987. She was the Secretary-General of the General Union of Palestinian Women from 1980 to 1985. In 1983, she served as the Deputy Secretary-General of the Fatah-Revolutionary Council. During Khalil al-wazir (Abu Jihad's) exile, Intissar lived with him for 30 years although she was not under exile. She returned to the Gaza Strip in 1995 and was elected to the PLC in 1996. She was Minister of Social Affairs of the Palestinian National Authority from 5 March 1994 to 24 February 2005.

In 2016, al-Wazir was head of the Palestinian Authority Martyrs Fund, the organization that provides stipends to the families of Palestinians killed or wounded during confrontations with Israeli authorities.

== Sources and external links ==
- Palestinian National Authority: Biography of PA Cabinet Intisar al-Wazir - Minister of Social Affairs
- Intisar al-Wazir
- Statement by Mrs. Intisar al-Wazir Minister of Social Affairs Palestinian National Authority

Political offices
Vacant Title last held by Awni Abd al-Hadi	Minister of Social Affairs; 1994–2005	Succeeded by Hasan Abu-Libdeh
