= Ministry of Social Development (Palestine) =

Government ministry of Palestine

- وزارة التنمية الاجتماعية في فلسطين

Agency overview
- Formed: 1948 (first form); 1994 (second form)
- Jurisdiction: Government of Palestine
- Headquarters: Ramallah, Palestine
- Minister responsible: Samah Hamad, Minister of Social Development
- Website: www.mosd.ps

The Ministry of Social Development (Arabic: وزارة التنمية الاجتماعية في فلسطين) is a government agency in Palestine responsible for overseeing social welfare programs and services. The ministry aims to promote social protection and support for vulnerable groups, including children, women, the elderly, and people with disabilities. Samah Hamad is the current minister.

Some of the key functions of the ministry include the development and implementation of social policies, the provision of social services and programs, the establishment of community development projects, and the coordination of efforts with other government agencies and civil society organizations.

The ministry's programs and services cover a wide range of areas, including child protection, disability services, gender-based violence prevention, elderly care, and poverty reduction. It also works to promote human rights and social justice in Palestine.

== List of ministers ==
All-Palestine Government

#	Name	Party	Government	Term start	Term end	Notes
Minister of Social Affairs
1	Awni Abd al-Hadi	Independent	All-Palestine	22 September 1948	1949	

Government of Palestine

#	Name	Party	Government	Term start	Term end	Notes
Minister of Social Affairs
1	Intissar al-Wazir	Fatah	1, 2, 3, 4, 5, 6	5 July 1994	7 October 2003	
2	Jawad Tibi	Fatah	7	7 October 2003	12 November 2003	
(1)	Intissar al-Wazir	Fatah	8	12 November 2003	24 February 2005	
3	Hasan Abu-Libdeh	Fatah	9	24 February 2005	29 March 2006	
4	Fakhri Turkman	Independent	10	29 March 2006	17 March 2007	
5	Saleh Zeidan	Democratic Front for the Liberation of Palestine	11	17 March 2007	14 June 2007	
6	Mahmoud al-Habbash	Independent	12	14 June 2007	19 May 2009	
7	Majida Al-Masri	Democratic Front for the Liberation of Palestine	13, 14	19 May 2009	6 June 2013	
8	Kamal al-Sharafi	Independent	15, 16	6 June 2013	2 June 2014	
9	Shawqi Al-Issa	Independent	17	2 June 2014	14 December 2015	
10	Ibrahim al-Shaer	Independent	17	14 December 2015	13 April 2019	
Minister of Social Development
11	Ahmed Majdalani	Palestinian Popular; Struggle Front	18	13 April 2019	31 March 2024	
12	Samah Hamad	Independent	19	31 March 2024	Incumbent	
