= Saba & Co. IP =

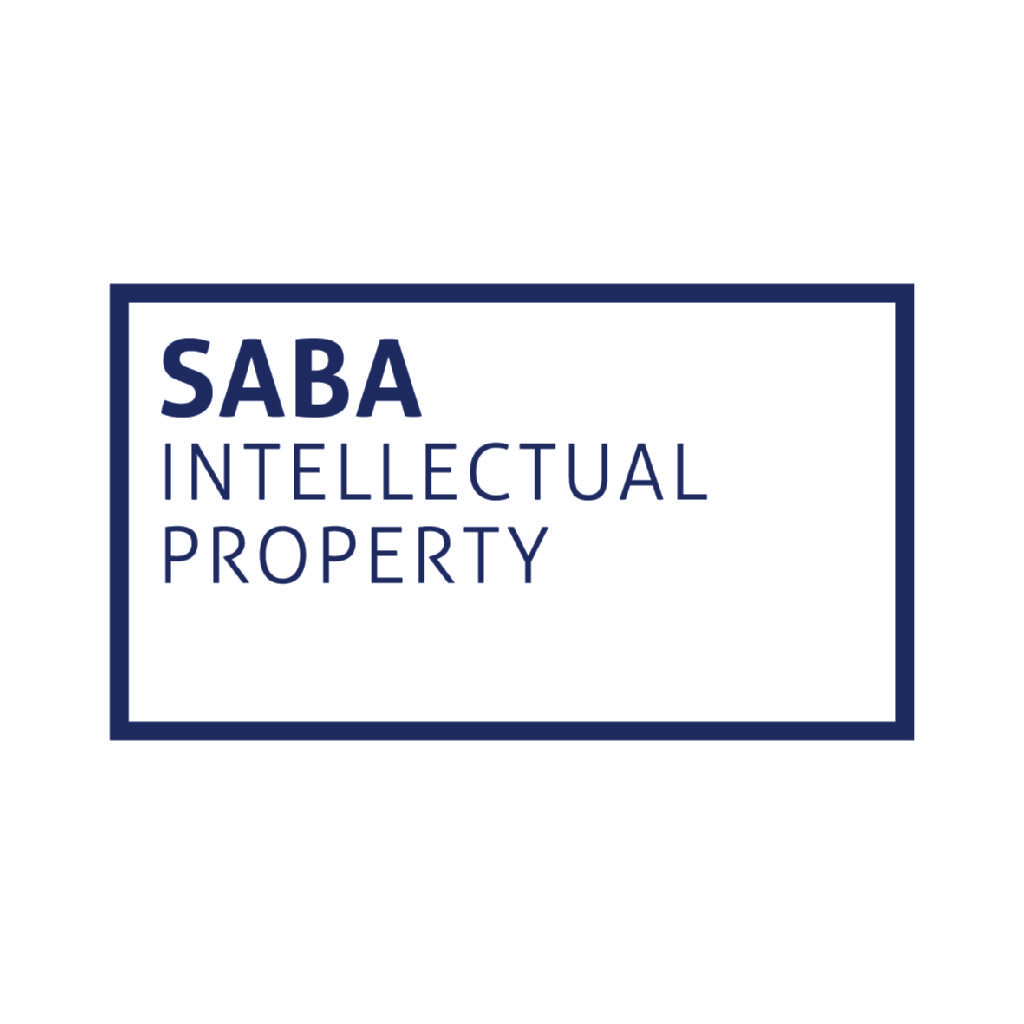
Saba & Co. Intellectual Property

Saba & Co. Intellectual Property, commonly referred to as Saba IP, is an intellectual property firm active in Middle East and Africa. Saba IP's services include trademark prosecution, trademark search, patent registration, litigation, IP enforcement, legal and technical translation, and copyright services.

== History ==
Saba IP has been catering to clients since the firm's establishment in 1926 and is active in all areas of counseling, prosecution, litigation, licensing, and translation. The Firm was founded by Fuad Saba in August 1926 after completing his education at the American University of Beirut. Saba & Co., as the firm was previously known, began as an auditing firm based in Jaffa Street, Jerusalem. The ‘30s and ‘40s witnessed the expansion of Saba's network of operation with the establishment of offices in Lebanon, Egypt, Jordan, Syria, Iraq, and Kuwait. In 1948, the Head Office was relocated to Beirut, Lebanon, where it is still located today in the upscale suburbs of Hazmieh. Alongside geographic expansions, the Firm also broadened its services. Fuad S. Saba, his partners, and their successors, introduced services such as tax consultation, and arbitrations, together with a trademark and patent department. The TMP department grew significantly over the years and resulted in the formation of Saba & Co. Intellectual Property.

== Services ==
The Firm consults clients on intellectual property rights counseling, prosecution, and enforcement and litigation. Saba IP also offers a wide selection of commercial IP services that include due diligence, licensing and franchising, translation, domain name registration, brand valuation, food and drug administration compliance, and company formation.

== Presence ==
Saba IP has an extensive network of branch and representative offices across the Middle East, Africa, and their neighboring regions. These jurisdictions cover Algeria, Bahrain, Cyprus, Egypt, Gaza, Iraq, Jordan, Kuwait, Lebanon, Libya, Morocco, Oman, Qatar, Saudi Arabia, Sudan, Syria, UAE, West Bank, and Yemen. Saba IP also maintains representatives in Turkey, India, Iran and Pakistan.
