= London Conference of 1939 =

1939 conference regarding the future governance of Palestine

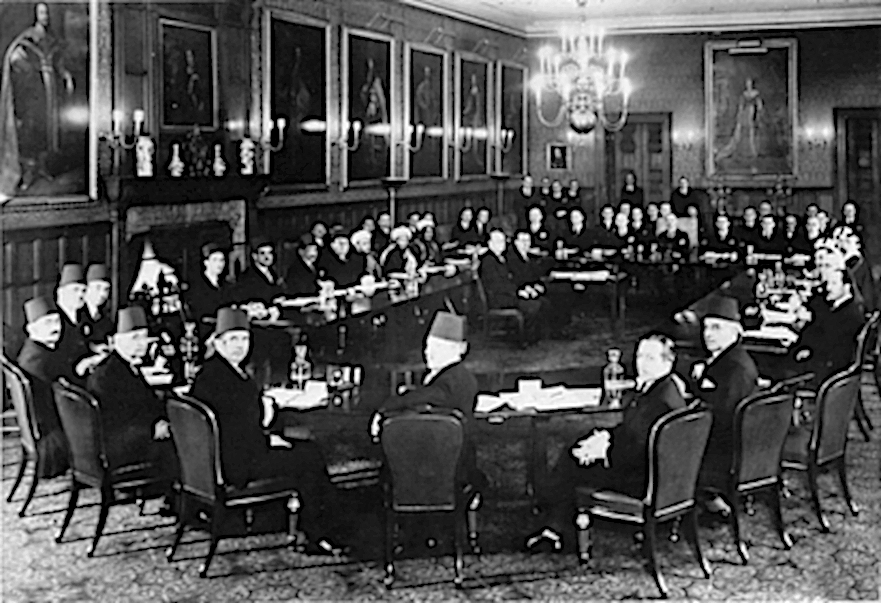
London Conference, St James's Palace, February 1939. Palestinian delegates (foreground), Left to right: Fuad Saba, Yaqub Al-Ghussein, Musa Alami, Amin Tamimi, Jamal Al-Husseini, Awni Abdul Hadi, George Antonious, and Alfred Roch. Facing are the British, with Neville Chamberlain presiding. To his right is Lord Halifax, and to his left, Malcolm MacDonald

The London Conference of 1939, or St James's Palace Conference, which took place between 7 February and 17 March 1939, was called by the British Government to plan the future governance of Palestine and an end of the Mandate. It opened on 7 February 1939 in St James's Palace after which the Colonial Secretary, Malcolm MacDonald held a series of separate meetings with the Arab Higher Committee and Zionist delegation, because the Arab Higher Committee delegation refused to sit in the same room as the Zionist delegation. When MacDonald first announced the proposed conference he made clear that if no agreement was reached the government would impose a solution. The process came to an end after five and a half weeks with the British announcing proposals which were later published as the 1939 White Paper.

== Background ==
In 1936, following the Great Arab Revolt, Palestinians went on a general strike. Additionally, Palestinian Arab leaders formed the Higher National Committee (HNC).

After the strike, the British government established the Peel Commission, chaired by Lord Peel, to investigate its causes and to make recommendations to the British government in the light of commitments made in the Balfour Declaration for the establishment of a homeland for the Jewish people in Palestine. The commission concluded that the only solution was to partition the country into a Jewish state and an Arab state. The two main Zionist leaders, Chaim Weizmann and David Ben-Gurion, had convinced the World Zionist Congress to approve equivocally the Peel recommendations as a basis for more negotiation.

The partition idea was rejected by the Arabs as it went against the promise made by the British for the Palestinians to have their own state and become independent. On 1 October 1937, with a resurgence of violence after the publication of the Peel Commission proposals, the HNC and all nationalist committees were outlawed. Five prominent Palestinians, including Yacoub Al Ghussein and three members of the HNC were deported to the Seychelles. The remaining members of the HNC were either already out of the country or, like Haj Amin Husseini, went into hiding and then into exile in Cairo, Damascus and Beirut.

Over the summer of 1938, antigovernment and intercommunal violence in Palestine reached new heights. Palestinians controlled large areas of the countryside and several towns, including the Old City of Jerusalem. The Zionist underground set off a series of lethal bombs in Palestinian markets across the country, and the Zionist Special Night Squads launched their first operations. In the autumn, the British authorities launched a counteroffensive. More British troops were sent, and martial law was declared.

In 1938, the Woodhead Commission was sent to Palestine to report on how to implement the partition proposals. The commission, chaired by Sir John Woodhead, was boycotted by the Palestinians, whose leaders had been deported or were in exile and who had no wish to discuss partition. The commission considered three different plans, one of which was based on the Peel plan. Reporting in 1938, the Commission rejected the Peel plan, primarily on the grounds that it could not be implemented without a massive forced transfer of Palestinians, an option that the British government had already ruled out. With dissent from some of its members, it instead recommended a plan that would leave the Galilee under British mandate but emphasised serious problems with it that included a lack of financial self-sufficiency for the proposed Palestinian state. The British government accompanied the publication of the Woodhead Report by a statement of policy rejecting partition as impracticable for "political, administrative and financial difficulties".

Coinciding with the publication of the Woodhead Commission's report on 9 November 1938, the government issued a statement that it wished to end the Mandate and that Britain would continue to govern Palestine until a new regime was established. To that end the Colonial Secretary, Malcolm MacDonald, invited a mixed Palestinian and Zionist delegation to London to discuss what form of government should be established. The statement concluded that if agreement was not reached with the two delegations, the government would put forward and implement its own proposals. The Palestinian delegation was to include Palestinians as well as representatives from five pro-British Arab regimes. The Zionist delegation was selected by the Jewish Agency and included Zionist Jews from the Jewish diaspora as well as the Yishuv.

By the winter of 1938, British thinking was dominated by the territorial expansion of Nazi Germany. If World War II occurred in Europe, it would be essential for Britain to maintain control over Egypt, Iraq and Palestine. It was certain that concessions would be offered to the Palestinians and that the Zionists would be disappointed.

== Preparation ==
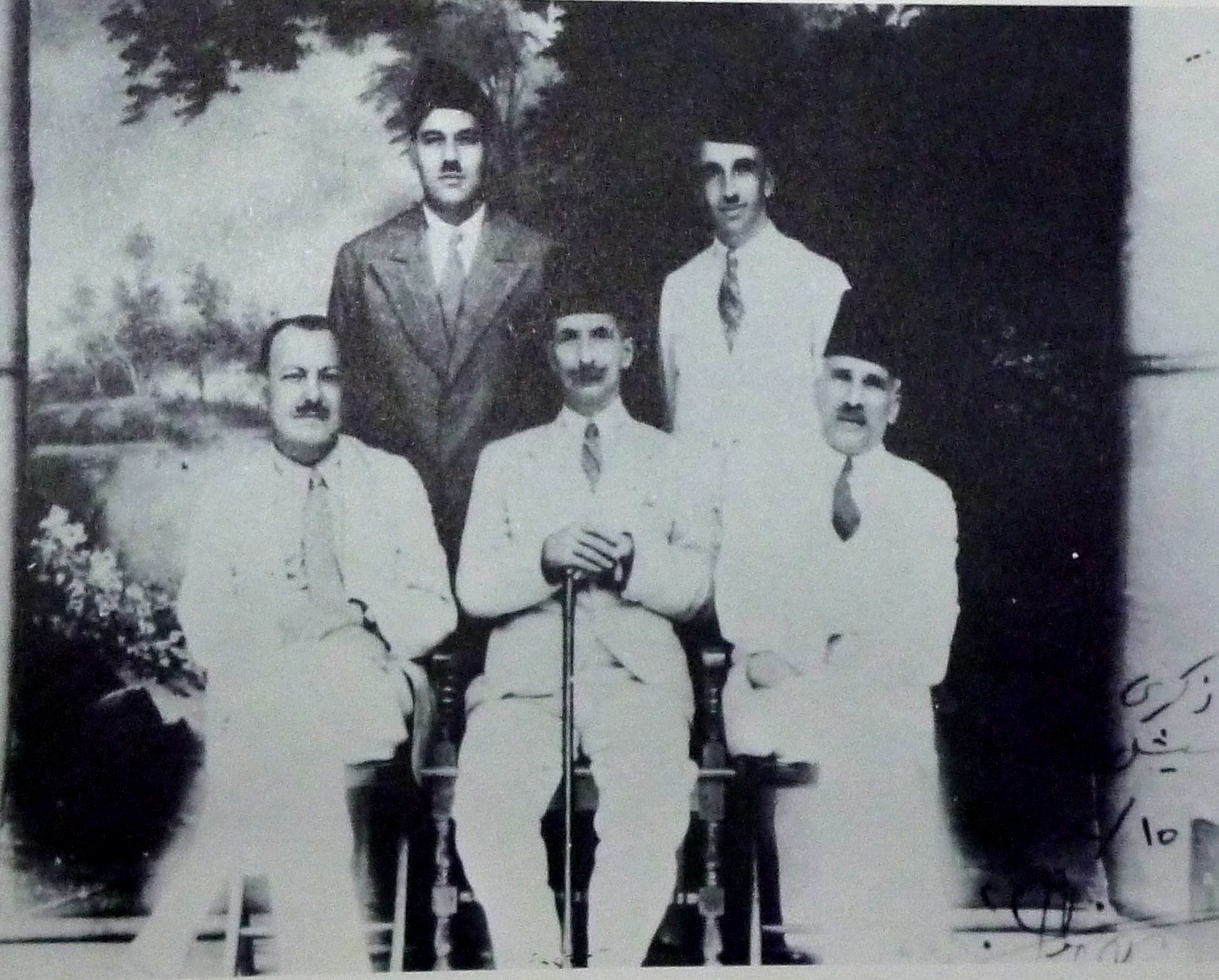
HNC leaders prior to their release from exile in the Seychelles, December 1938. Hussein al Khalidi seated left, Fuad Saba standing right. Ahmad Hilmi centre.

Some Palestinian leaders welcomed the proposed conference but it soon became clear that there was not going to be any alternative to dealing with the disbanded Higher National Committee (HNC) and former Mufti of Jerusalem Amin Husseini. On 23 November the Colonial Secretary, Malcolm MacDonald, repeated his refusal to allow Amin Husseini to be a delegate, but announced his willingness to allow the five Palestinian leaders held in the Seychelles to take part in the conference. This was part of an agreement made in London following informal meetings between MacDonald and Musa Alami to ensure a Palestinian Arab presence at the conference. MacDonald also assured Alami that the Mandate would be replaced with a treaty. The deportees were released on 19 December and allowed to travel to Cairo and then, with Jamal Husseini, to Beirut where a new Higher National Committee was established. Amin Husseini, who was living in Beirut, was not a member of the resulting delegation but it was under his direction. This can be seen in the refusal to accept any delegates from the National Defence Party (NDP). Attempts to form an alternative, more pro-British and less militant, Palestinian delegation led to two additional NDP delegates being added to the Palestinian representation after the start of the conference.

The five Arab regimes invited were the Kingdoms of Egypt, Iraq, Saudi Arabia, and Yemen, and the Emirate of Transjordan - all within the British sphere of influence. Egypt, Iraq and Saudi Arabia had been instrumental in ending the 1936 strike.

The Zionists had reacted negatively to the proposed conference and debated whether they should attend. Their delegation was led by Chaim Weizmann in the name of the Jewish Agency. To emphasise its claim to represent all Jews, and to counterbalance the presence of representatives from the Arab states, the delegation included members from the US, Europe, Britain, South Africa, and Palestine.

The conference was opened by the Prime Minister, Neville Chamberlain on 7 February 1939 at St James's Palace, London. The Palestinian delegation refused to attend any joint sessions with the Zionist Jewish Agency delegation so there were two ceremonies. This was at the insistence of the Palestinian delegates. The first ceremony, for the Palestinian delegation, was at 10.30 a.m., the second for the Zionist Jewish Agency delegation was at 11.45.

== Meetings with Palestinian Delegation ==
The Arab Palestinian delegation was led by Jamal Husseini and consisted of Awni Abd al-Hadi, Yacoub Al Ghussein, Husayin al-Khalidi, Alfred Roch and Musa Alami. They were accompanied by George Antonius and Fuad Saba, who were to act as secretaries. The Egyptian delegate was Aly Maher, and Iraq was represented by Prime Minister Nuri Said. The Saudis were represented by Prince Faisal and Prince Khalid, both of whom later became kings of Saudi Arabia.

The Arab Palestinian delegates had meetings with the representatives from the Arab states in Cairo from 17 January. Despite pressure from the other delegates, the Arab Palestinian group refused to include any representatives from the moderate National Defence Party (NDP) of Raghib al-Nashashibi. A campaign of violence between the rebels and the NDP's supporters led to 136 deaths in 1939. The NDP claimed to represent most of the upper classes and demanded representation at the London conference. The British let it be known that if agreement could not be reached, they would talk to two Palestinian Arab delegations. Nashashibi and his deputy Ya'aqoub Farraj joined the Arab delegation two days after the opening ceremony.

Although the Arab Palestinian delegates refused to have any contact with the Zionists, some meetings took place with other Arab delegates.

On 9 February, Jamal Husseini put forward the Arab position:

- Independence
- No Jewish national home in Palestine
- Replacement of the Mandate by a treaty
- End of Jewish immigration

On February 16, 1939, a meeting was held with Arab leaders. The goal of the meeting was to either reach an agreement or, if that was not possible, ensure that the British government understood the wishes of both sides so it could act accordingly.

During the discussion, the Arab parties were offered a proposal for the establishment of an Arab state, within which a Jewish minority would have equal rights.

The first task the conference set itself was to establish the meaning of a series of letters, written in Arabic in 1915 to 1916, between the British government and the governor of Mecca, Hussein bin Ali. Known as the McMahon-Hussein Correspondence, the letters are credited with encouraging Husseini to call for the Arab Revolt against the Ottoman Empire. An Anglo-Arab committee was set up, presided by the Lord Chancellor, Frederic Maugham, to examine the issue. An official version of the letters was published for the first time. The committee concluded that the Arab perspective had been downplayed and that as of 1918, the British government had no authority to ignore the views of the existing inhabitants in what would become Palestine. However, the two sides failed to agree on the exact meaning of some of the territorial references, particularly whether or not "portions of Syria lying to the west of the districts of Damascus, Hamah, Homs and Aleppo cannot be said to be purely Arab, and must on that account be excepted from the proposed delimitation" included Palestine.

One option discussed with both delegations was the idea of a Jewish canton as part of a Greater Syria, but the proposal was quickly rejected by both sides.

On 6 March, a member of the Egyptian Foreign Ministry flew from Cairo to Beirut to try to get Amin Husseini to approve concessions that were considered by the delegation. Husseini insisted to continue to reject the British proposals.

On 17 March, after he had warned the delegation a day earlier, MacDonald read a statement outlining the British proposals and closed the conference. There had been 14 British-Arab sessions. The British proposals were published two months later in what became known as the 1939 White Paper.

== Meetings with Zionist Jewish Agency delegation ==
The Jewish Agency delegation was led by Chaim Weizmann, the chairman of the World Zionist Organization, but it was David Ben-Gurion, the leader of the Jewish Agency, who dominated decisions. It was Ben Gurion who argued that the delegation should be in the name of the Zionist Jewish Agency, rather than the Jewish delegation. However, since it claimed to represent all Jews, it included some non-Zionists such as Sholem Asch and Lord Melchett as well as the president of Agudat Yisrael. American Zionists included Rabbi Stephen Wise and Rose Jacobs. British Zionists included Selig Brodetsky. A sign of Ben Gurion's power was his success in blocking Lord Herbert Samuel's membership in the delegation.

Other members of the delegation were Moshe Sharett, Leonard Stein and Berl Katznelson. Blanche Dugdale and Doris May also attended.

The conference marked Ben Gurion's becoming the prime mover in Zionist policy-making. It also saw a change in his thinking towards what he referred to in his diaries as "combative Zionism". He believed that the Yeshuv in Palestine needed to become strong enough to defend itself in the event all out war broke out. Out of its 440,000, between 25,000 and 40,000 are estimated to have been armed. Ben Gurion's priority was continued and increased immigration, particularly young people of military age.

After the opening ceremony, the meetings were chaired by MacDonald. Weizmann's presentation of the Jewish Agency position reduced to four points:

- Jews in Palestine must be the majority
- Continuation of the Mandate
- Continuation of Jewish immigration
- Investment to speed up development in Palestine

The delegation was willing to accept the partition of the country, as recommended by the Peel Commission, under protest. The two main Zionist leaders, Chaim Weizmann and David Ben-Gurion, had convinced the World Zionist Congress to approve equivocally the Peel recommendations as a basis for negotiation.

Despite the Arab Palestinian boycott of the Zionist Jewish Agency, some meetings took place with Arab Palestinians. On the evening of 7 March, the British managed to hold an informal meeting between three Arab Palestinian delegates and four of the Jewish delegates with MacDonald and three other British officials. The Egyptian delegate, Aly Maher, appealed for a reduction of illegal Jewish immigration and an end to the violence. Weizmann replied by suggesting that they might find common ground but was interrupted by Ben Gurion's insistence that there could be no reduction. The meeting soon ended.

At the 24 February 1939 meeting, Ben Gurion laid out the Zionist Jewish Agency's minimum terms, the continuation of the Mandate and the rejection of anything that would imply Jewish minority status. The meeting also had MacDonald announce the outlines of the British policy: after a transition period, Palestine would become an independent state allied to Britain, and the Jewish minority would have protected status. On 26 February, both delegations received a written summary of what was planned. That evening, the Zionist Jewish Agency refused to attend a government ceremonial dinner in its honor. On 27 February, the Mapai newspaper in Palestine, Davar, published a cable from Ben Gurion: "There is a scheme afoot to liquidate the National Home and turn us over to the rule of gang leaders". On the same day, Zionist attacks took place through a co-ordinated series of bombs across Palestine murdering 38 Palestinians, motivated by Ben-Gurion. The delegation refused to hold any further formal sessions and reduced its involvement to informal meetings in MacDonald's office.

St John Philby, an advisor to the Saudi delegates, held a lunch at his home on 28 February with Weizmann, Ben Gurion and Fuad Hamza, the Saudi foreign affairs official. Philby put forward his own proposals, but no further meetings took place though he had discussions with Weizmann and Shertok later that year.

On 3 March, Ben Gurion failed to get the delegation to disband, and it was agreed to remain in London. On 4 March, he became ill and had to withdraw for several days. By 16 March, many of the delegates had left London.

On 17 March, Weizmann sent a letter to MacDonald: "The Zionist delegation, having given profound consideration to the proposals placed before it by His Majesty's Government on 15 March 1939, regrets that it is unable to accept them as a basis for agreement, and has therefore decided to disband".

== Aftermath ==
Two days before the end of the conference, the German Army occupied the rest of Czechoslovakia.

These were Colonial Secretary's final proposals, which were published on 17 May 1939:

- A limit to Jewish immigration for five years after which numbers would be set with agreement with the Arab Palestinians
- Restrictions on Jews buying land.
- Gradual introduction of Arab Palestinians, into senior administrative posts.
- Transfer after ten years of all powers to a representative government

The proposals were conditional on the end of violence in Palestine. If after ten years, no agreement had been reached about the form of government, the British would reconsider the situation.

After the delegations had left London, the British made a further attempt to get Arab approval by suggesting a faster transfer of power conditional on an end to violence and the involvement of the League of Nations if conditions were unsuitable for independence after ten years. In May, the HNC delegation announced its rejection of the White Paper, with Amin Husseini imposing the decision on the majority of delegates that was in favour of accepting. That tactical blunder did not help the Arab National Council in any way. It has been suggested that he had to refuse to deal with the British to maintain his leadership of the actual rebels in Palestine.

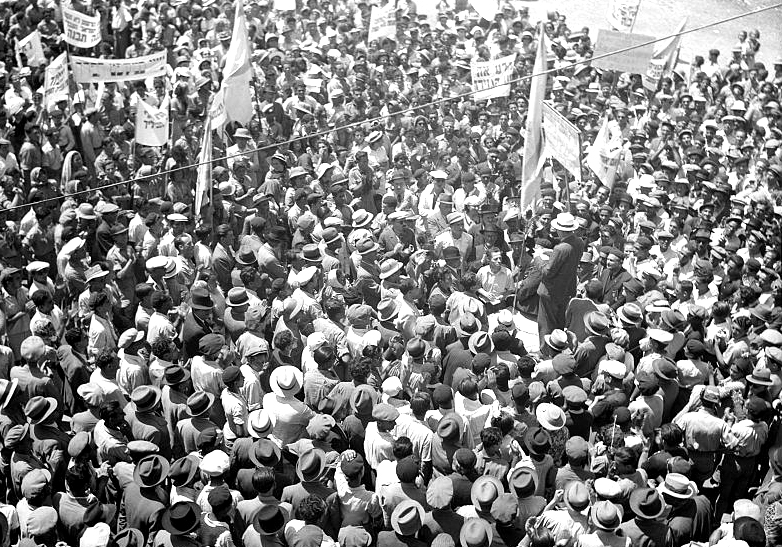
Yitzhak Ben-Zvi addresses demonstration against the White Paper, Jerusalem, 18 May 1939

On 17 April, the Histadrut announced the launch of a campaign against the proposals. In the first month after the end of the conference, over 1,700 Jewish illegal immigrants entered Palestine. On 17 May, to mark the publishing of the White Paper, telephone wires were cut and government offices attacked. There were riots in Jerusalem, and Jewish attacks on Arabs and government property continued through the summer. The Jewish underground Etzel claimed to have killed More than 130 people during that period. There was also an increase in illegal immigration, with 6,323 arriving between April and October, leading to a peak in Jewish unemployment.

In Zionist circles, Herbert Samuel was accused of being responsible for some of the ideas in the White Paper.

Ben Gurion wrote in his diary: "This is not the last word." He later claimed that Prime Minister Neville Chamberlain had explicitly told him that the policy would not outlive the war.

== Sources ==
- A Survey of Palestine - prepared in December 1945 and January 1946 for the information of the Anglo-American Committee of Inquiry. Reprinted 1991 by The Institute of Palestine Studies, Washington. Volume one: ISBN 0-88728-211-3.
- Abcarius, M.F. (nd) Palestine. Through the Fog of Propaganda. Hutchinson.
- Antonius, George (1938) The Arab Awakening. The Story of the Arab National Movement. Hamish Hamilton. (1945 edition)
- Nevill Barbour Nisi Dominus - A Survey of the Palestine Controversy. First published 1946. The Institute for Palestine Studies, Beirut 1969. Reprint series No. 3.
- Bar-Zohar, Michael (1978) Ben-Gurion. Translated by Peretz Kidron. Weidenfeld & Nicolson, London. ISBN 0-297-77401-8. Originally published in Israel 1977. p. 94
- Cohen, Aharon (1970) Israel and the Arab World. W.H. Allen. ISBN 0 491 00003 0.
- Israel Pocket Library (1973) History From 1880. Ketter Books, Jerusalem.
- Kayyali, Abdul-Wahhab Said (1981) Palestine. A Modern History Croom Helm. ISBN 086199-007-2.
- Khalidi, Walid (1984) Before their Diaspora: A photographic history of the Palestinians, 1876-1948. Institute of Palestine Studies. ISBN 0-88728-143-5.
- Marlowe, John (1946) Rebellion in Palestine. The Cresset Press, London.
- Segev, Tom (2000) One Palestine, Complete - Jews and Arabs under the British Mandate. Little, Brown & Co. ISBN 0-316-64859-0.
- Teveth, Shabtai (1987) Ben-Gurion. The Burning Ground. 1886-1948. Houghton Mifflin. ISBN 0-395-35409-9.
- Weizmann, Chaim (1949) Trial and Error. Hamish Hamilton. (2nd edition. April 1949).
