= Awni Abd al-Hadi =

Palestinian political figure

Awni Abd al-Hadi عوني عبد الهادي
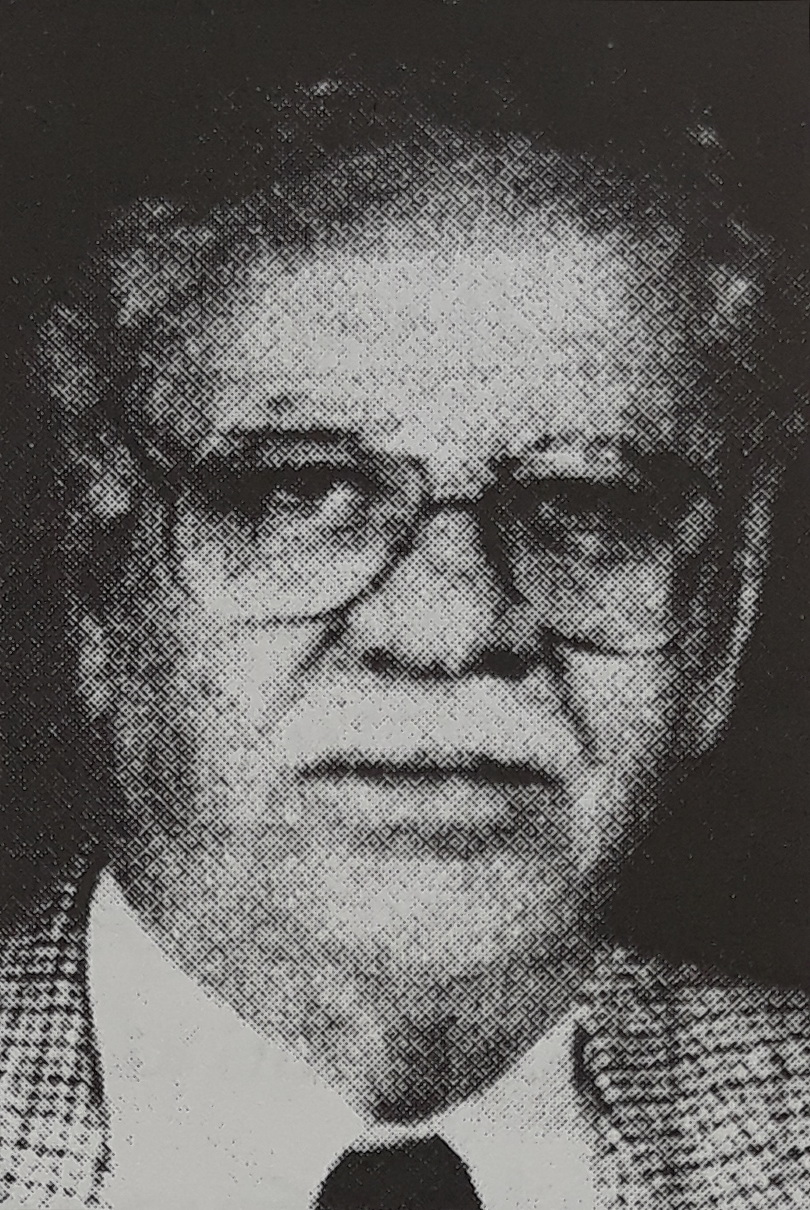

Minister of Social Affairs of Palestine
- In office 22 September 1948 – 1949
- President: Amin al-Husseini
- Prime Minister: Ahmed Hilmi Pasha
- Preceded by: Office established
- Succeeded by: Intissar al-Wazir (1994)

Personal details
- Born: 1889 Nablus, Ottoman Empire
- Died: 15 March 1970 (aged 80–81) Cairo, Egypt
- Party: Independent
- Spouse: Tarab Abd al-Hadi
- Education: Sorbonne University
- Occupation: Politician

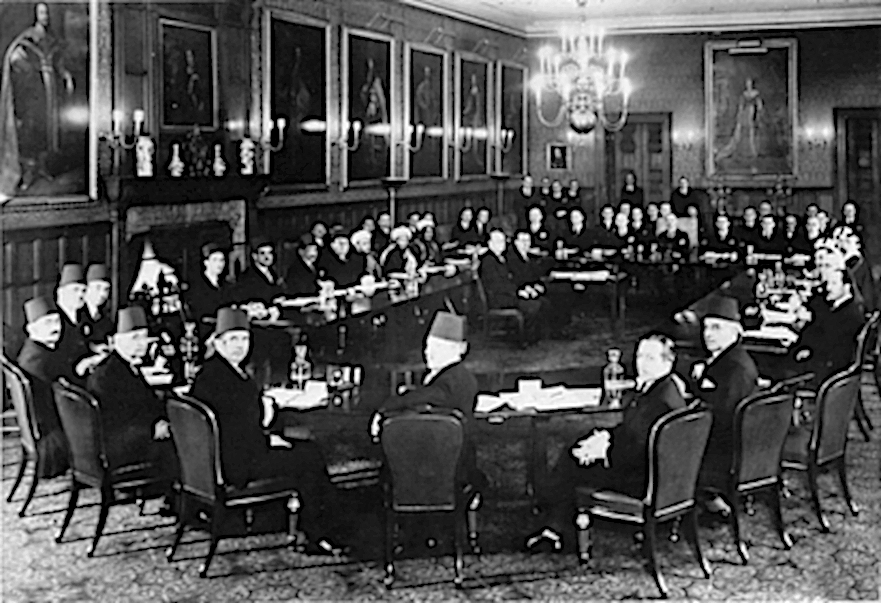
London Conference, St. James' Palace, February 1939. Palestinian delegates (foreground), left to right: Fu'ad Saba, Yaqub Al-Ghussein, Musa Alami, Amin Tamimi, Jamal Al-Husseini, Awni Abd al-Hadi, George Antonious, and Alfred Roch. Facing the Palestinians are the British, with Sir Neville Chamberlain presiding. To his right is Lord Halifax, and to his left, Malcolm MacDonald. The Arab delegation refused to sit together with the Jewish delegation.

Awni Abd al-Hadi (Arabic: عوني عبد الهادي), also known as Auni Bey Abdel Hadi and Awni Abdul Hadi (1889, Nablus, Ottoman Empire – 15 March 1970, Cairo, Egypt), was a Palestinian political figure. He was educated in Beirut, Istanbul, and at the Sorbonne University in Paris. His wife was Tarab Abd al-Hadi, a Palestinian activist and feminist.

== Political activity ==
In 1911, Abd al-Hadi, along with Rafiq al-Tamimi were founding members of the Paris-based underground al-Fatat ("the Young Arab Society") nationalist society, which was devoted to Arab independence and unity. He was among the organizers of the Arab Congress of 1913 in Paris. When Faisal I of Iraq arrived in Paris en route to London in December 1918 Ahmad Qadri located Abd al-Hadi introduced him to Faisal who appointed him as the head of the administrative office for the Arab delegation to the Paris Peace Conference, 1919. Abd al-Hadi was later an adviser to Amir Abdullah in Transjordan.

On his return to Palestine in 1924, Abd al-Hadi became one of the chief spokesmen of the Palestinian Arab nationalist movement and was elected representative to the 5th (August 1922, Nablus) and 6th (June 1923, Jaffa) Congress of the Arab Executive Committee for Jenin and to the 7th (June 1928) for Beisan. He was secretary of the Executive Committee's Congress in 1928.

In 1930, Abd al-Hadi was a member of the Palestinian Arab delegation to the United Kingdom and a lawyer for the Supreme Muslim Council. In August 1932 he was a founder, general secretary and first elected president of the Independence Party of Palestine, the first regularly constituted Palestinian Arab political party. He was also the party's representative on the Arab Higher Committee, formed in April 1936, for which he served as general secretary. Abd al-Hadi was a moderate who was prepared to negotiate with members of the Yishuv.

Abd al-Hadi held some responsibility for the Arab revolt of 1936–1939. The Istiqlal Party was banned and he, who was out of the territory at the time, was banned from re-entry to Palestine. The British administration also deported three committee members and two other political leaders in 1937 (until 1941). He was a member of the Palestinian delegation to the London Conference in February 1939.

After the 1948 Arab–Israeli War, Awni Abd al-Hadi ended up in Cairo, Egypt with his wife, Tarab Abdul Hadi. In 1948, Abd al-Hadi was a member and appointed Minister of Social Affairs of the Egyptian-sponsored All-Palestine Government headed by Amin al-Husayni. From 1951 to 1955, he was Jordan's minister and later ambassador to Cairo. He was Minister of Justice from July 1956 to October 1956. From 1955 to 1958, he was a Jordanian senator and from 1958 chairman of the Arab League's Legal committee in Cairo.

Abd al-Hadi died on 15 March 1970 in Cairo, Egypt.

== Notes ==
Political offices
New office	Minister of Social Affairs of Palestine; 1948–1949	Vacant Title next held by Intissar al-Wazir
