= Yaqub al-Ghusayn =

Palestinian politician (1899–1948)

Yaqub al-Ghussayn
- يعقوب الغصين
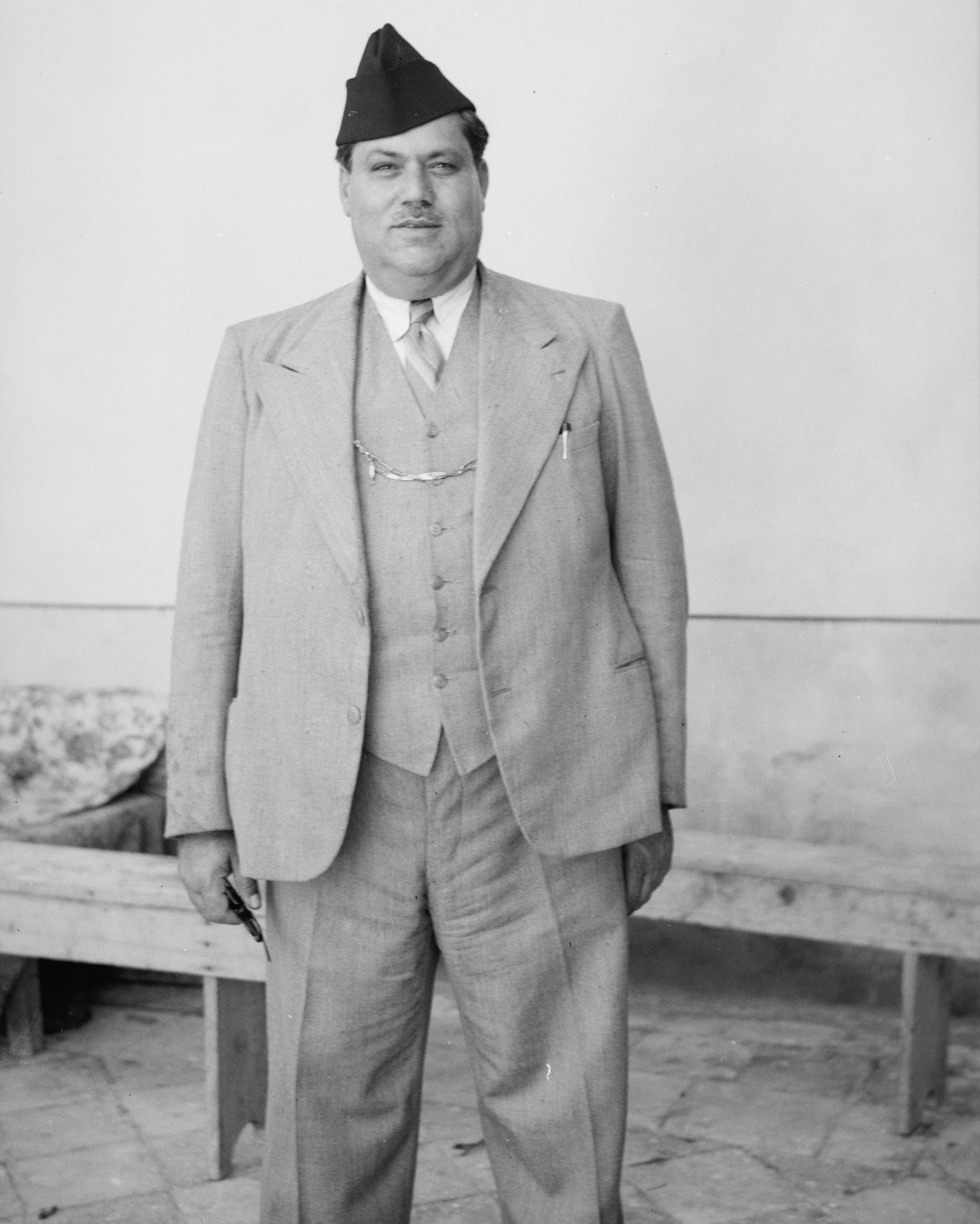
- Yaqub al-Ghusayn (Yacoub Bey Ghussein) in 1943, Keeper of the Bustami Shrine

President of the National Congress of Arab Youth
- In office January 1932 – ?

Member of the Arab Higher Committee
- In office 1936–1937

Member of the Supreme Muslim Council
- In office 1937–?

Personal details
- Born: 1899 Ramla, Mutassarifate of Jerusalem, Ottoman Empire
- Died: 27 December 1948 (aged 48–49) Jerusalem, West Bank, Hashemite Kingdom of Jordan
- Party: Youth Congress Party
- Education: University of Cambridge
- Occupation: Landowner, politician

Yaqub al-Ghusayn (Arabic: يعقوب الغصين, Ya‘qoub al Ghussein) (1899–1948) was a Palestinian landowner from Ramla and the founder of the Youth Congress Party.

== Early life and education ==
He got his initial education at the Sultani School in Jerusalem from where he graduated in 1917. He later graduated in law from the University of Cambridge, UK. He worked as an inspector at a railway station until the British Mandate, before moving to the field of business and agriculture.

== Family and personal life ==
He was married to Thuriya Nuseibeh, also a Palestinian noble, and they had 11 children; Talat, Khaled, Abdel-Kareem, Tawfiq, Aida, Khalida, Heya, Motia’a, Khadija, Nuzha and Fatoum.

== Political career ==
Ghusayn was member of different youth societies in Palestine before he himself established the Muslim Youth Society in Ramleh in 1927. He was elected president of the first National Congress of Arab Youth, held in Jaffa in January 1932. He was a member and representative of his party in the Arab Higher Committee from its formation in 1936. In 1937 he became a member of the Supreme Muslim Council. On 1 October of the same year he was exiled by the British to the Seychelles Islands for being a member of the Arab Higher Committee. The Arab Higher Committee was outlawed by the British on 27 September 1937, following the assassination of the Acting British District Commissioner of Galilee, Lewis Yelland Andrews. Ghussein was the first Palestinian leader to be exiled by the British.

He was also a member of the Palestinian delegation to the London Conference at St. James's Palace in February 1939.

Ghusayn reconstituted his faction in 1945. He died in Jerusalem on 27 December 1948.

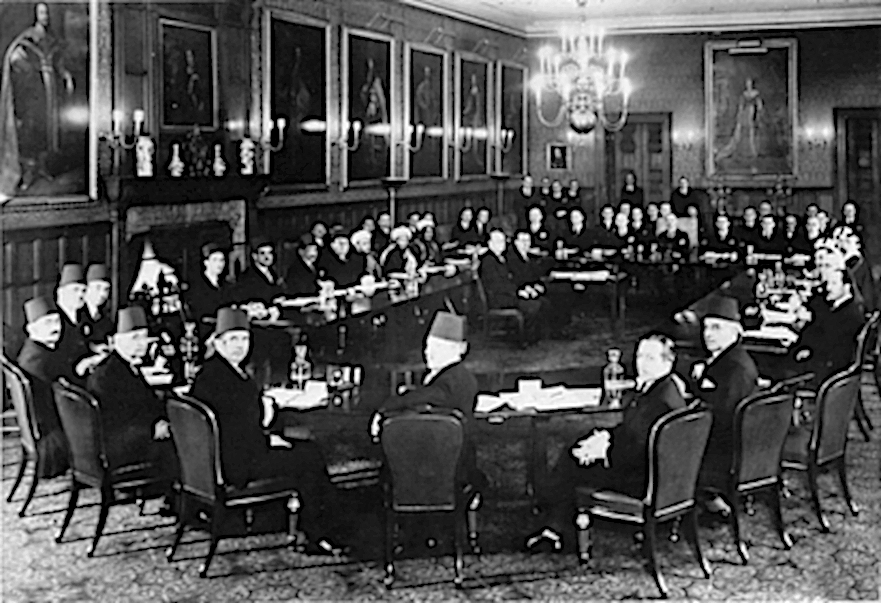
London Conference, St. James' Palace, February 1939. Arab Palestinian delegates (foreground), Left to right: Fuad Saba, Yaqub Al-Ghussein, Musa Alami, Amin Tamimi, Jamal Al-Husseini, Awni Abdul Hadi, George Antonious, and Alfred Roch. Facing the Palestinians are the British, with Sir Neville Chamberlain presiding. To his right is Lord Halifax, and to his left, Malcolm MacDonald.
