= Fuad Saba =

Palestinian politician and businessman (1902–1984)

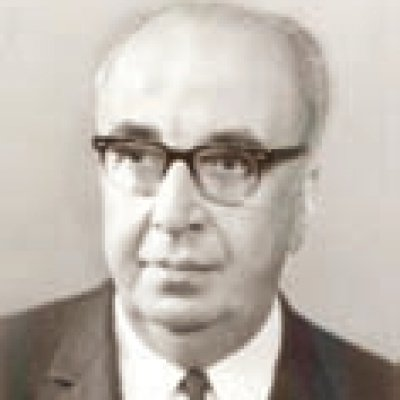
- Born: Fuad Salih Saba; 1902; Shefa-Amr, Ottoman Palestine
- Died: 27 August 1984 (aged 81–82); Beirut, Lebanon
- Resting place: Beirut
- Education: American University of Beirut
- Occupation: Accountant
- Years active: 1920s–1980s
- Known for: Founder of Saba & Co.
- Spouse: Muhiba Khattar Maluf
- Children: 3

Fuad Saba (Arabic: فؤاد سابا; 1902–1984) was a Palestinian accountant, businessman and politician during Mandatory Palestine. Among the first Palestinians to receive an accounting certificate, he co-founded the international firm Saba & Co. in Jerusalem with his brother.

He was among the community leaders of Arab Anglicans in Palestine. A member of the Palestine Arab Party, Saba was a leading politician in Mandatory Palestine who attempted to end Jewish settlement in Palestine.

Born in Ottoman Palestine, Saba was not allowed to return to Palestine at several points in his lifetime. Beginning in October 1937, he and other members of the Arab Higher Committee were exiled for several years by the British government. Following forced displacement from Jerusalem due to the Nakba in 1948, he relocated the Saba & Co. headquarters to Beirut.

== Early life and education ==
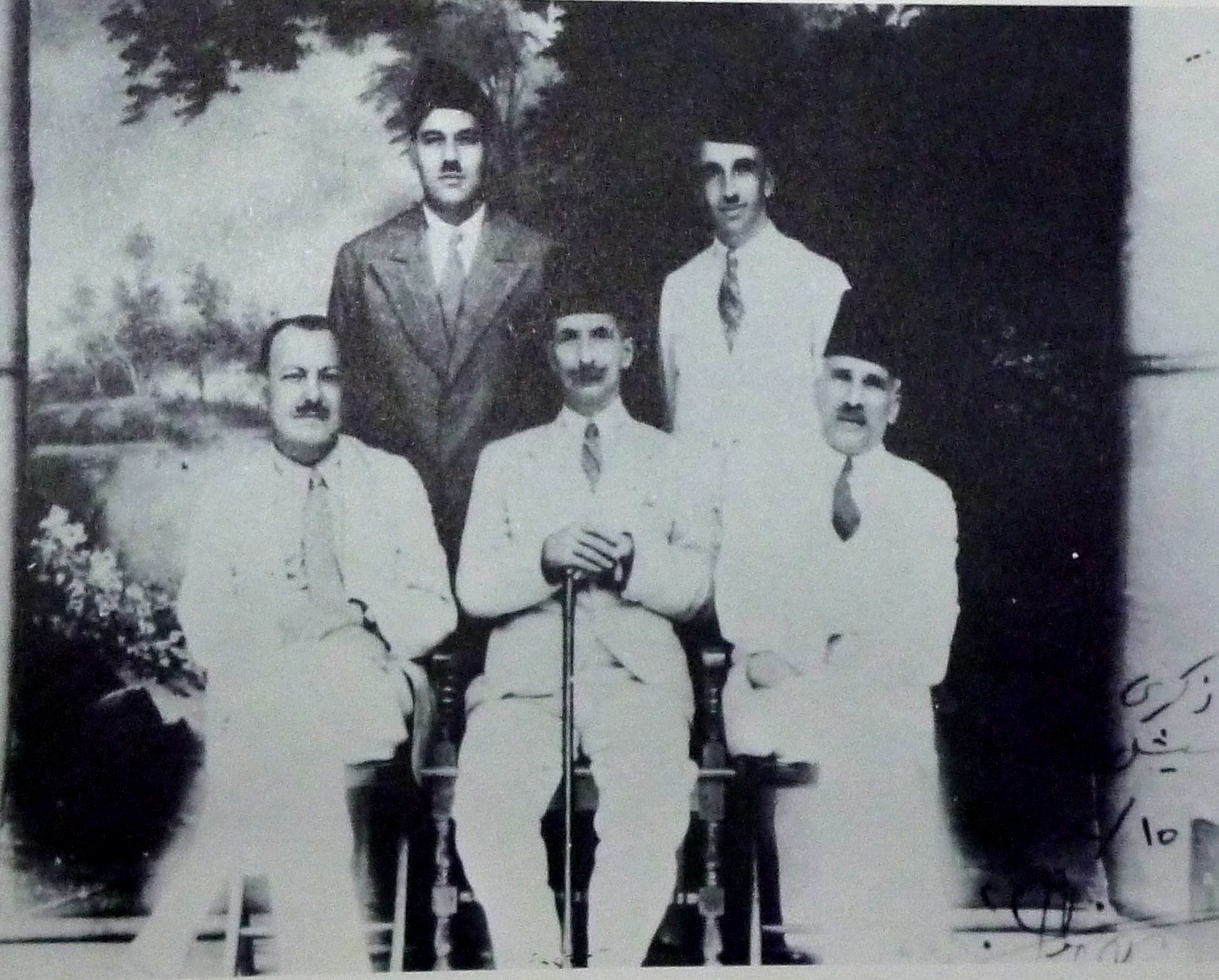
Palestinian leaders during the exile in Seychelles (Fuad Saba, standing right)

Saba was born in Shefa-Amr, Ottoman Palestine, on 14 December 1902. He was the son of Salih Saba, an Anglican pastor, and Louisa Meyer.

Saba attended the Orthodox School, the Maronite School, the Frères Secondary School in Haifa and St. George's School in Jerusalem. He obtained a degree in commerce from the American University of Beirut in 1924. Then he continued his studies in accountancy in England.

== Career and activities ==
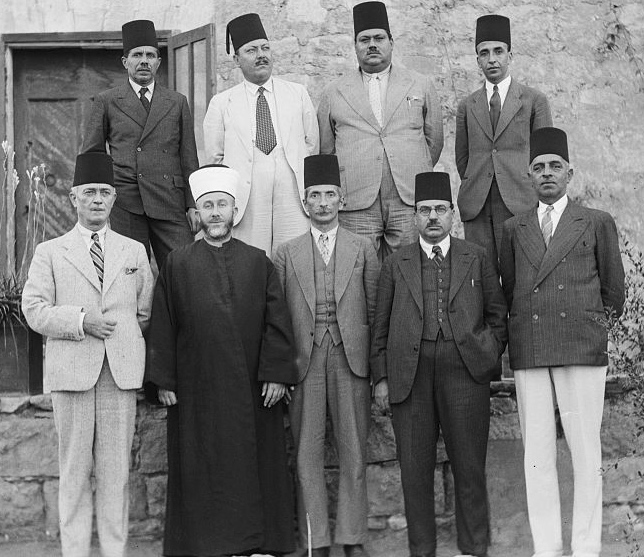
Arab Higher Committee (Fuad Saba, standing right)

Following his graduation, Saba taught at Catholic Terra Sancta College in Jerusalem for a while. He was qualified as a certified accountant, receiving a license from the Institute of Chartered Accountants in the United Kingdom.

Then, he and his brother Aziz started an accounting company, Saba & Co., in 1926. Saba's company expanded over time, opening branches in Haifa and Jaffa. Its branches were opened later in Beirut, Lebanon; Amman, Jordan; Damascus, Syria; and Baghdad, Iraq. The company opened further branches in Kuwait in 1949, and in Saudi Arabia and Libya in 1957.

He was involved in the establishment of the Arab Bank in 1930 and of the Palestinian National Fund. He worked as an auditor of the Arab Bank; he was the first Palestinian licensed auditor to practice under the British Mandate.

Saba was a member of the Palestine Arab Party which opposed the Zionist rule in the region. He founded the Arab Publication Company in Jerusalem in 1935. The company produced two magazines on Arab economic affairs, Arab Economic Affairs (1935–1936) and Palestine and Transjordan (1936–37). The latter was published in English, and both titles were edited by Saba. He also founded the Arab News Agency.

Saba was named as the secretary of the Arab Higher Committee in 1936. Alongside fellow committee members Hussein Khalidi, Yaqub al-Ghusayn, Ahmed Hilmi Pasha, and Rashid al-Haj Ibrahim, Saba was arrested by the British Mandate rulers on 1 October 1937, immediately after the assassination of British official Lewis Andrews. The men were not responsible for any act related to the murder, but the British government in Palestine declared that they were "morally responsible" for the incident. They were deported to the Seychelles in HMS Destroyer Active on 1 October and arrived the island 11 October 1937. Their exile ended on 28 December 1938, and they were sent to Cairo. Until February 1940, there was an exclusion order against him, with the British government not allowing him to return to Palestine.

Saba became a member of the Palestinian delegation to the Roundtable Conference at St James's Palace in London in February 1939. During the conference, the Palestinian delegation opposed the British White Paper proposals. Saba had to leave Jerusalem after the conference; he moved to Beirut where he resided until 1942, when his return to Palestine was allowed by the British. He continued to work in his accounting firm and was one of the founders of the Arabia Insurance Company and Al Mashriq Investment Company. He also became a fellow of the Institute of Arbitrators in Palestine during this period. He published a book entitled Income Tax and Its Problems in Palestine in 1947.

Saba was forced to leave Jerusalem after the Nakba in 1948. He settled in Beirut, where the headquarters of Saba & Co. was reopened. The company became the most comprehensive accounting firm in the Middle East and merged with Deloitte & Touche in 1990.

== Personal life and death ==
Saba was married to Muhiba Khattar Maluf, and they had three children: two sons, Suhail and Fawzi, and one daughter, Nadia. His wife, Muhiba, was of Lebanese origin. Fawzi Saba died in Barbados on 18 September 2000. His another son, Suhail, died on 8 February 2023.

Fuad Saba died in Beirut on 27 August 1984, and was buried there.
