= List of political parties in Palestine =

The following political parties, listed in alphabetic order, have taken part in recent elections for the Palestinian National Authority in Palestine.

In 1994, The Palestinian Authority was formed, the governing body for the interim period pending final status negotiations. The President of the State of Palestine is the highest-ranking political position, the equivalent to head of state, in the Palestinian National Authority (PNA). The President is elected by popular elections. The Palestinian Legislative Council is the legislature of the Palestinian Authority. It is not to be confused with the Palestinian National Council, which remains the national legislature of the Palestinian people as a whole. The PLC passed a new law in June 2005 increasing the number of MPs from 88 to 132, stipulating that half be elected under a system of proportional representation and half by traditional constituencies.

== Legislative Council members ==
Party	Abbr.	Flag	Founded	Leader	Political position	Seats in Legislative Council
Islamic Resistance Movement; Arabic: حركة المقاومة الإسلامية; Ḥarakat al-Muqāwamah al-ʾIslāmiyyah	Hamas حماس		1987	Khalil al-Hayya	Right-wing	74 / 132
Palestinian National Liberation Movement; Arabic: حركة التحرير الوطني الفلسطيني; Ḥarakat at-Taḥrīr al-Waṭanī al-Filasṭīnī	Fatah فتح		1965	Mahmoud Abbas	Centre to centre-left	45 / 132
Popular Front for the Liberation of Palestine; Arabic: الجبهة الشعبية لتحرير فلسطين; al-Jabhah al-Sha`biyyah li-Taḥrīr Filasṭīn	PFLP		1967	Ahmad Sa'adat	Far-left	3 / 132
Third Way; Arabic: الطريق الثالث; aṭ-Ṭarīq ath-Thālith			2005	Salam Fayyad	Liberalism	2 / 132
Palestinian National Initiative; Arabic: المبادرة الوطنية الفلسطينية; al-Mubādara al-Waṭaniyya al-Filasṭīniyya	PNI		2002	Mustafa Barghouti	Left-wing	2 / 132
Democratic Front for the Liberation of Palestine; Arabic: الجبهة الديموقراطية لتحرير فلسطين; al-Jabhah al-Dīmuqrāṭiyya li-Taḥrīr Filasṭīn	DFLP		1968	Nayef Hawatmeh	Far-left	1 / 132
Palestinian People's Party; Arabic: حزب الشعب الفلسطيني; Ḥizb al-Sha'b al-Filasṭīnī	PPP		1982	Bassam as-Salhi	Left-wing	1 / 132
Independent	—N/a					4 / 132

== Unrepresented parties ==
Party	Abbr.	Flag	Founded	Founder	Political position
Liberty; Arabic: الحرية; al-Huriyatu			2005	Marwan Barghouti	Centre-left
Arab Liberation Front; Arabic: جبهة التحرير العربية; Jabhet al-Tahrir al-'Arabiyah	ALF		1969	Rakad Salem	
Vanguard for the Popular Liberation War - Lightning Forces; طلائع حرب التحرير الشعبية - قوات الصاعقة; Ṭalāʾiʿ ḥarb al-taḥrīr al-shaʿbiyya - Quwwāt as-Ṣāʾiqa	As-Sa'iqa الصاعقة		1966	Farhan Abu Hayja	Far-left (Note: Due to its association with the Ba'ath Party (Syrian-dominated faction))
Palestinian Liberation Front; Arabic: جبهة التحرير الفلسطينية; al-Jabha li-Tahrir al-Filastiniyya	PLF		1959	Wasel Abu Yousef	
Palestinian Liberation Front (Abu Nidal Ashqar wing); Arabic: جبهة التحرير الفلسطينية (جناح أبو نضال الأشقر)	PLF (ANAW)		1983	Abu Nidal Ashqar	
Palestinian Liberation Front (Abd ul-Fattah Ghanim wing); Arabic: جبهة التحرير الفلسطينية (جناح عبد الفتاح غانم)	PLF (AFGW)		1983	Abd ul-Fattah Ghanim	
Palestinian Arab Front; Arabic: الجبهة العربية الفلسطينية; Al-Jabhet Al-'Arabiya Al-Falestiniyeh	PAF		1993	Jameel Shihadeh	Left-wing
Palestinian Democratic Union; Arabic: الاتحاد الديمقراطي الفلسطيني; Al-Ittihad al-Dimuqrati al-Filastini	FIDA		1990	Saleh Ra'fat	Left-wing
Palestinian Communist Party; Arabic: الحزب الشيوعي الفلسطيني; al-Hizb al-Shuyueiu al-Filastiniu	PCP		1991	Mahmoud Sa'adeh	Far-left
Palestinian Popular Struggle Front; Arabic: جبهة النضال الشعبي الفلسطيني; Jabhet Al-Nedal Al-Sha'abi Al-Falestini	PPSF		1967	Ahmed Majdalani	Left-wing
Palestinian Popular Struggle Front (Khalid ʽAbd al-Majid); Arabic: جبهة النضال الشعبي الفلسطيني (خالد عبد المجيد)	PPSF (KAM)		1991	Khalid ʽAbd al-Majid	Left-wing
Popular Front for the Liberation of Palestine – General Command; Arabic: الجبهة الشعبية لتحرير فلسطين – القيادة العامة	PFLP-GC		1968	Ahmed Jibril	Left-wing (Note: Considers itself nominally socialist)
Reform and Development Party; Arabic: حزب الإصلاح والتنمية	RDPP		2019		
Revolutionary Palestinian Communist Party; Arabic: الحزب الشيوعي الفلسطيني-الثوري	RPCP		1982	Arabi Awwad	Far-left
National Coalition for Justice and Democracy; Arabic: الائتلاف الوطني من أجل العدالة والديمقراطية	Wa'ad		2004	Eyad al-Sarraj	Left-wing
Palestinian Justice; Arabic: العدالة الفلسطينية	PJP		2005	Usâma Salîm Muhammad	
Palestinian Freedom Movement; Arabic: حركة الأحرار الفلسطينية	Fatah al-Yasir		2007	Khalid Abu-Hilal	Right-wing
Palestinian Mujahideen Movement; Arabic: حركة المجاهدين الفلسطينية	PMM		2001	Asaad Abu Sharia	Right-wing

== Alliances ==
Party	Founded	Political position	Status
Alliance of Palestinian Forces; Arabic: تحالف القوى الفلسطينية	1993	Big tent	Active
Palestinian National and Islamic Forces	2000	Big tent	Defunct
Ahd Bloc; Arabic: كتلة العهد	2005	Left-wing	Defunct
The Alternative; Arabic: البديل; al-Badeel	2006	Left-wing	Defunct
Bethlehem Brotherhood and Development; Arabic: بيت لحم تآخي وتطوير	2005	Left-wing	Defunct
Democratic Alliance; Arabic: التحالف الديمقراطي	1980s	Left-wing	Defunct
Democratic Alliance List; Arabic: قائمة التحالف الديمقراطي	2016	Left-wing	Defunct
Freedom and Social Justice	2006	Left-wing	Defunct
Hope and Labour Bloc; Arabic: كتلة الأمل والعمل	2005	Center-left	Defunct
Palestinian National Alliance; Arabic: التحالف الوطني الفلسطيني	1983	Left-wing	Defunct
Palestinian National Salvation Front; Arabic: جبهة الانقاذ الوطني الفلسطيني	1985	Left-wing	Defunct
Reform Bloc; Arabic: كتلة الاصلاح; Kutla Al-Islah	2005	Right-wing	Defunct
Rejectionist Front; Arabic: جبهة الرفض	1974	Left-wing	Defunct
Sons of the Land (Beit Jala)	2005	Left-wing	Defunct
Unified National Leadership of the Uprising; al-Qiyada al Muwhhada	1989	Left-wing	Defunct
United Beit Jala	2005	Left-wing	Defunct
United Bethlehem Bloc; Arabic: كتلة بيت لحم الموحدة; Kutla Beit Laham Al-Muwahida	2005	Left-wing	Defunct
Wafaa Bloc; Arabic: كتلة الوفاء	2005	Right-wing	Defunct

== Defunct parties ==
Party	Founded	Political position	Founder
Al-Mustaqbal; المستقبل; The Future	2005	Centre-left to Left-wing	Marwan Barghouti
Palestine Popular Liberation Organization; Arabic: المنظمة الشعبية لتحرير فلسطين	1964	Far-left	Muhammad Fayyad; Ibrahim Khraysha

== See also ==
- Politics of the Palestinian National Authority
