= 2005 Bethlehem municipal election =

Municipal elections were held in Bethlehem in 2005.

== Elected candidates ==
Rank	List	Candidate name	Gender	Religion	Votes	%
1	Brotherhood & Development	Victor Batarseh	♂	†	2690	36%
2	United Bethlehem	Antun Salman	♂	†	2164	29%
3	Reform	Hasan Al-Masalma	♂	☪	2005	27%
4	United Bethlehem	Afram Asmari	♂	†	2000	26%
5	Wafaa	Isa Zawahara	♂	☪	1922	25%
6	United Bethlehem	Khalil Chawka	♂	☪	1912	25%
7	Reform	Khalid Jadu	♂	☪	1853	25%
8	Hope & Labour	Zughbi Zughbi	♂	†	1808	24%
9	Reform	Nabil Al-Hraymi	♂	☪	1752	23%
10	Reform	Salih Chawka	♂	☪	1716	23%
11	Reform	Yusuf Al-Natsha	♂	☪	1716	23%
12	Brotherhood & Development	Nina 'Atwan	♀	†	1709	23%
13	Brotherhood & Development	George Sa'ada	♂	†	1687	22%
14	Independent	Nadir Al-Saqa	♂	†	1537	20%
15	United Bethlehem	Duha Al-Bandak	♀	†	1512	20%

== Unsuccessful candidates ==
Rank	List	Candidate name	Gender	Religion	Votes	%
16	United Bethlehem	Jamila Subh	♀	☪	1498	20%
17	Al-Ahd	Peter Al-Qumri	♂	†	1453	19%
18	United Bethlehem	Abd Allah Al-Hajj	♂	☪	1446	19%
19	United Bethlehem	Wadi'Al-A'ma	♂	†	1426	19%
20	United Bethlehem	Basim Mazruqa	♂	†	1426	19%
21	Reform	Aliyya Qadi	♀	☪	1421	19%
22	United Bethlehem	Nadir Rahil	♂	†	1414	19%
23	Brotherhood & Development	Izz Al-Din Al-Hraymi	♂	☪	1398	19%
24	Brotherhood & Development	Jalil Ilyas	♂	†	1382	18%
25	United Bethlehem	Amir Kamil	♂	☪	1369	18%
26	Reform	Yusuf Brayjiyya	♂	☪	1283	17%
27	Brotherhood & Development	Nasri Chawka	♂	☪	1251	17%
28	Hope & Labour	Usama Abu Rudayna	♂	†	1250	17%
29	Brotherhood & Development	Ibrahim Matta	♂	†	1186	16%
30	Hope & Labour	Nabil Da'na	♂	☪	1173	16%
31	United Bethlehem	George Hazina	♂	†	1173	16%
32	Brotherhood & Development	Victor Jiyaqaman	♂	†	1172	16%
33	United Bethlehem	Fayiz Hazbun	♂	†	1151	15%
34	Wafaa	Nasir Chawka	♂	☪	1141	15%
35	Wafaa	Jamal Chakhtur	♂	☪	1133	15%
36	Independent	Sa'ud 'Isa	♂	☪	1101	15%
37	Hope & Labour	Mishel Frayj	♂	†	1088	14%
38	Hope & Labour	Muhammad Salahat	♂	☪	1087	14%
39	Hope & Labour	Salim Thaljiyya	♂	†	1068	14%
40	Independent	Kamil Kamil	♂	☪	1059	14%
41	Brotherhood & Development	Wa'il Al-Jarashi	♂	☪	966	13%
42	Al-Ahd	Ahlam Wahsh	♀	☪	945	13%
43	Wafaa	Husam 'Abd Allah	♂	☪	932	12%
44	United Bethlehem	Khalid Charabati	♂	☪	845	11%
45	United Bethlehem	Muhammad 'Awwad	♂	☪	809	11%
46	Hope & Labour	Yusuf Al-Hraymi	♂	☪	795	11%
47	Brotherhood & Development	Mahir Al-Bandak	♂	†	766	10%
48	Al-Ahd	Semiramis Kutlu	♀	†	762	10%
49	Brotherhood & Development	Muhammad Jubran	♂	☪	740	10%
50	Brotherhood & Development	Yunil Anastas	♂	†	718	10%
51	Hope & Labour	Khalid Khlayf	♂	☪	682	9%
52	Al-Ahd	Idris Isma'il	♂	☪	670	9%
53	Hope & Labour	Saliba Tawil	♂	†	665	9%
54	Hope & Labour	Nuha Abu 'Isha	♀	☪	658	9%
55	Brotherhood & Development	Khalil Abu Kamil	♂	☪	637	8%
56	Hope & Labour	Basim Tuwayma	♂	†	636	8%
57	Brotherhood & Development	Nadiyya Ta'amra	♀	☪	635	8%
58	United Bethlehem	Ahmad Jawarish	♂	☪	610	8%
59	Al-Ahd	Sulayman Al-Lusi	♂	†	601	8%
60	Hope & Labour	Abd Allah Ta'amra	♂	☪	598	8%
61	Brotherhood & Development	Abd Al-Rahman 'Abidin	♂	☪	526	7%
62	Al-Ahd	Talal Dabnak	♂	☪	513	7%
63	Independent	Arif Khlayf	♂	☪	497	7%
64	Al-Ahd	Muhammad Jawarish	♂	☪	438	6%
65	Al-Ahd	Amir Hirmas	♂	☪	435	6%
66	Al-Ahd	Khalil Handal	♂	†	402	5%
67	Independent	Ilham 'Abd Al-Jawad	♀	☪	354	5%
68	Independent	Ilyas Babun	♂	†	326	4%
69	Independent	Jadu' Hasan	♂	☪	279	4%

== Sources ==
- https://web.archive.org/web/20070503001328/http://www.gremmo.mom.fr/legrain/bethleem/bethleem38.htm

== See also ==
- Palestinian municipal election, 2005
