= Battle of Tripoli (1983) =

Battle during the Lebanese Civil War

- Part of the Lebanese Civil War
- Battle of Tripoli (1983) (Lebanon)
Date	3 November – 20 December 1983 (1 month, 2 weeks and 3 days)
Location	Tripoli, Lebanon
Result	Pro-Syrian Palestinian victory: PLO driven out of Lebanon

Belligerents
(Palestine Liberation Organization) Pro-Syrian Palestinian factions Syria; Libya (alleged)	Palestine Liberation Organization; Islamic Unification Movement (IUM)

Commanders and leaders
(Palestine Liberation Organization) Said al-Muragha (Palestine Liberation Organization) Abu Khalid al-Amla (Palestine Liberation Organization) Ahmed Jibril (Syria) Hafez al-Assad (Syria) Suleyman al-Issa	(Palestine Liberation Organization) Yasser Arafat (Palestine Liberation Organization) Khalil al-Wazir; Said Shaaban

Units involved
PLO dissidents: Fatah al-Intifada; PFLP; As-Sa'iqa; Non-PLO Palestinian factions: Abu Nidal Organization; PFLP-GC; Palestine Liberation Army (PLA); Syrian Arab Armed Forces: Syrian Army; Special forces; Syrian Air Force; Pro-Syrian Alawite militants	Fatah: Al-'Asifah; IUM factions

Strength
6,000 Palestinian troops 10,000 Syrian soldiers	4,500–8,000

Casualties and losses
Unknown	200 killed, 2,000 wounded
- ~1,500 casualties overall (first month)

The Battle of Tripoli (Arabic: مَعْرَكَة طَرَابُلُس, romanized: Maʿrakat Ṭarābulus) was a major battle during the middle of the Lebanese Civil War in late 1983. It took place in the northern coastal city of Tripoli between pro-Syrian Palestinian militant factions and the Palestine Liberation Organization (PLO) led by Yasser Arafat. It resulted in the withdrawal of PLO and mostly ended their involvement in the war.

== Background ==
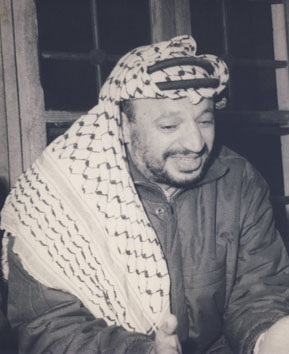
Yasser Arafat (1974)

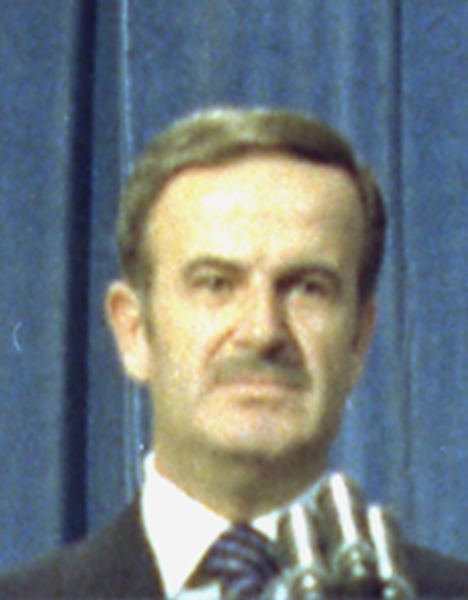
Hafez al-Assad (1977)

Syria intervened in the Lebanese Civil War, occupying the country from 1976. The Syrians were backed by various local allies and proxy factions, many of whom were Palestinians. In 1982, Israel invaded Lebanon to expel the various Palestinian militant groups from the country. Even though the Israelis failed to evict most militant factions, the PLO was severely weakened by the invasion and had to evacuate. The organization fled to various Arab countries whose governments attempted to gain more control over it, though Arafat opposed this development. In particular, Syria under President Hafez al-Assad attempted to gain more influence by backing PLO dissidents. By late 1982, Arafat was increasingly moderating his position toward Israel, while distancing himself from Syria. In addition, his strategies in regard to the Israeli–Palestinian conflict fell under growing scrutiny. His critics also accused him of no longer properly opposing "reactionary Arab regimes", including Lebanon's government, and of protecting officers who had displayed gross cowardice or incompetence during the 1982 Israeli invasion. This contributed to disputes within the PLO, with several factions opposing Arafat's stances. The dissidents began to organize under the leadership of Said al-Muragha (alias "Abu Musa"), Abu Khaled al-Amlah, Abu Salih, and others who managed to gain Assad's support.

In the next months, several PLO battalions in northern Lebanon started to rally behind Said al-Muragha, whereupon Arafat responded by expelling him and other critics from leadership positions. Instead of solving the crisis, this move cemented the divisions and factually split the PLO into pro- and anti-Arafat elements. Other PLO commanders like Khalil al-Wazir unsuccessfully tried to mediate the disputes. Faced with growing unrest among Palestinian guerrillas in Lebanon, Arafat returned to the country in May 1983, intending to counter the rebellion led by Musa Awad ("Abu Akram") of the Libyan-backed Popular Front for the Liberation of Palestine – General Command (PFLP-GC). Assad considered Arafat's return a personal challenge, especially as the PLO leader accused Syria of supporting the PFLP-GC, furthering the tensions.

Meanwhile, many other dissidents unified under the leadership of Said al-Muragha, and ultimately formed the Fatah al-Intifada. Arafat and his loyalists initially believed that they could easily deal with the dissidents, but the latter began to receive covert support from Syria and thus rapidly grew in strength. Clashes between the PLO and the dissidents continued throughout the summer, while the PLO suffered from desertions and shrank from 11,000 militants to between 4,500 and 8,000. As the dissidents grew in strength, Syria abandoned its previous official neutrality and sided openly with Said al-Muragha's faction. Assad expelled Arafat and his followers from Syria in June, after the PLO had publicly complained over the Syrian support of his rivals. Other anti-Arafat factions in the PLO such as the Popular Front for the Liberation of Palestine (PFLP) and the Democratic Front for the Liberation of Palestine (DFLP) initially tried to mediate, and distanced themselves from Said al-Muragha's forces, declaring neutrality. In contrast, hardline anti-Arafat groups like the PFLP-GC, as-Sa'iqa, and the Abu Nidal Organization exploited the situation and actively aided the PLO dissidents.

By late 1983, PLO presence in Lebanon was mainly reduced to two refugee camps in Tripoli, namely Beddawi and Nahr al-Bared, and the Beqaa Valley. Arafat's attempts to negotiate with Hafez al-Assad failed to reduce the tensions. From September 1983, the PLO leader was headquartered in Beddawi and voiced his concerns about an upcoming offensive by dissident groups. Arafat attempted to rally his remaining loyalists and mobilized some local and international support, though his efforts were largely unsuccessful. One militant group, the Islamic Unification Movement (IUM), chose to fight alongside the PLO, while the Kataeb Party provided some weaponry. Arafat's alliance with the IUM caused further criticism from other Palestinian groups, as they decried the IUM as "fanatic and reactionary". Regardless, the IUM under Said Shaaban proved to be a capable ally, and helped the PLO to clear Tripoli of all pro-Syrian groups.

Ultimately the PLO loyalists lost almost all their strongholds and were effectively besieged in Tripoli. Lebanese media claimed that commanders of the anti-PLO Palestinian factions proceeded to meet in Damascus, planning a final offensive against the PLO. The PFLP and DFLP also abandoned their neutrality, and sided with Said al-Muragha. Assad mobilized about 5,000 Palestinian militants as well as two special forces brigades in support of the operation, placing Syrian officer Suleyman al-Issa in charge of a joint operations room. However, it remains unclear whether Assad actually intended to kill Arafat. By late October, pro-Syrian forces had surrounded Tripoli, while Syria increased the output of anti-PLO propaganda.

== Battle ==
In early November, anti-PLO Palestinian factions and Syrian troops, reportedly backed by Libyan forces, started to assault PLO positions in the outskirts of Tripoli, most importantly Beddawi and Nahr al-Bared. The anti-Arafat militants accused the PLO of having started the fighting. The anti-Arafat forces included Said al-Muragha's followers, the PFLP, PFLP-GC, as-Sa'iqa, the Palestine Liberation Army (PLA), and the Abu Nidal Organization. Overall, the besiegers would include 10,000 Syrian soldiers and 6,000 Palestinian militants.

The initial clashes involved heavy weaponry, including artillery. While the ground war was raging, the propaganda war was also relentless. Arafat called upon other Islamic countries to assist the PLO to avoid "a new massacre", believing that international pressure would force Damascus to accept him as the legitimate leader and stop the fighting. However, Arab support for the PLO was mostly confined to statements of denunciation by Iraq towards the Syrian actions and Egypt sending an arms shipment to Arafat's forces. Another PLO ally, East Germany, sent "boatloads" of weaponry, food, and medical supplies to assist Arafat's forces in Tripoli. It was speculated that both the Israeli Navy as well as the Syrian Navy were deliberately allowing arms shipments to reach Arafat, as the former approved of the fighting among the PLO's factions, while Syria did not want to "act openly". The Soviet Union voiced its opposition to Syria's attacks against the PLO, but refrained from an intervention. The PLO also tried to mobilize grassroots support, for example calling on Alawites to speak out against Assad after Syrian special units opened fire on a demonstration in support of Arafat in Yarmouk camp.

All of us are very angry. It is unfair to do this in Tripoli. If they want to fight, they should fight in another place, for example Israel. Or they can fight the Israelis in southern Lebanon. But to kill each other and to terrify us, I don't believe it.

— Ahmed Masri, Tripoli's Islamic Hospital administrator

The rebels captured Nahr al-Bared on 6 November. On 9 November, a ceasefire was agreed upon, while negotiations between the PLO, the anti-Arafat groups, and Syria were initiated under mediation by Kuwait, Saudi Arabia, Algeria, Lebanese third parties such as statesman Rashid Karami, and the Arab League. The ceasefire was possibly connected to a phase of internal problems in Syria, as a succession crisis developed amid a sickness of Assad. Fighting eventually resumed. By 16 November, the PLO had been mostly expelled from the two camps, though some Arafat loyalist pockets initially held out in Beddawi. The Syrian Armed Forces then surrounded Tripoli itself and initiated an artillery and aerial bombardment, displacing many civilians and destroying three ships in the harbor. The PLO responded in kind, countering with their own Katyusha rocket launchers, and mortars, deliberately hiding them amid residential areas. The artillery duel ultimately destroyed parts of Tripoli's port, its oil refinery, and central market. Arafat's followers began a counter-attack at Beddawi on 18 November; the operation lasted for three days, but produced few tangible results aside from widespread destruction due to heavy artillery fire. By 20 November, control of Beddawi was largely unclear, though the Arafat loyalists reportedly controlled the southern and western sides of the camp.

On 22 November, the Syrian-backed dissidents made major advances at the edges of Tripoli despite heavy resistance by the PLO loyalists, securing the Mallouleh intersection at the city's northern entrance and cutting all roads through the Baal Mohsen quarter which led to Beddawi. The last Arafat loyalists at the latter camp were thus cut off from aid. At this point, pro-Syrian Alawite militants also rose up within Tripoli, attacking Arafat's forces. Even though the PLO loyalists were increasingly cornered, IUM leader Said Shaaban urged Arafat to stay and keep fighting. In turn, Arafat declared that any withdrawal of his forces was conditioned on the Syrian-backed militants staying out of Tripoli and leaving his allies including the IUM alone. Despite the IUM's support, however, many Lebanese politicians were increasingly joining those who demanded that the PLO leave the country to finally end the clashes. On 26 November, the Palestinian rebels decided to postpone a threatened attack, to give time to a Saudi-Syrian truce plan.

Faced with repeated attacks by the Syrians and allied Palestinians, coupled with the inaction of other countries, Arafat eventually yielded and agreed to a ceasefire as well as evacuation deal at the end of November. After obtaining promises from the United States and Arab countries that his forces would not be attacked on their retreat, the PLO agreed to leave Tripoli. The evacuation of his forces had to be delayed, however, as the Israeli Navy began to shell Tripoli. Arafat's forces agreed to leave their heavy weapons behind, including the Katyusha multiple rocket launchers, technicals, recoilless rifles, and antiaircraft guns. These were handed over to the Lebanese Army. About 4,700 PLO loyalists, including dozens of wounded, were evacuated by five Greek ships under protection of French Navy vessels, including the aircraft carrier Clemenceau, on 20 December. After Arafat boarded his vessel and waved to the crowd in the harbor, his followers and the IUM militants saluted him by firing their weapons into the air. The PLO militants reportedly felt a mixture of frustration and relief, as they had lost the battle and had to move abroad, but at least survived the "devastating artillery siege".

The PLO loyalists were moved to Algeria, North Yemen, Tunisia, and Sudan. About 500 disembarked in Cyprus and were then flown to Iraq. Syria and the anti-PLO factions had thus succeeded in expelling Arafat's loyalists from all of Lebanon. However, the IUM remained entrenched in Tripoli, and took control of the previously PLO-held harbor.

== Aftermath ==
Arafat's forces were able to secure a safe exit from Tripoli towards Tunisia. Arafat's first stop was in Egypt, with which his relationship was improving following the Camp David Accords. He then held a meeting in Alexandria with Egyptian President Hosni Mubarak on 22 December. This meeting was supposed to demonstrate that the PLO remained committed to its independent course, and would not yield to Syrian pressure. From 1983, Israel began to treat the PLO as being divided into two fully independent groups: The pro-Syrian PLO group in Lebanon, and the PLO loyalist faction of Arafat which operated outside Lebanon.

The struggle is not over. We will continue until we reach Jerusalem, the capital of our Palestinian state.

— Yassir Arafat, speaking to reporters before leaving Tripoli

The Syrian role in the battle of Tripoli was strongly criticized by many Sunni Arabs in Lebanon, Syria, and elsewhere, regarding it as betrayal of the Palestinian cause. Kuwait even threatened to suspend economic assistance to Syria. In contrast, East Germany –an ally of Arafat– covertly supported Syria during and after the conflict, even though it simultaneously sent supplies to assist the PLO. The decision to secretly assist Syria was motivated by the East German leadership's belief that Syria was an important factor in the struggle against radical Islamists, most importantly the Muslim Brotherhood, whereas Arafat and his faction had allied themselves with Islamists. Regardless, the East German leadership maintained strong links to Arafat's forces over the next years.

Tripoli's residents were generally frustrated about the Palestinians and Syrians turning their city into a battleground, blaming both sides for the conflict. One Tripoli Police inspector stated that the city's residents had come to "hate them all", referring to the Palestinian factions, the IUM, and the Syrian Army.

=== Casualties and losses ===
Within the first week of combat, at least 250 people were killed and 400 wounded, most of them civilians. By 21 November, 500 people had been killed and 1,500 wounded, mostly civilians. Overall, the PLO loyalists suffered 200 dead and 2,000 wounded. It was estimated that half of Tripoli's population of 500,000 to 600,000 was displaced due to the battle.

=== Strategic implications ===
The loss of Tripoli meant that Arafat's loyalists no longer possessed any bases in proximity to Israel and Palestine.

The battle has exacerbated the division within the PLO and the continued positions of its leadership in moderation and willingness to accept a settlement with Israel that would lead to a Palestinian state over part of it rather than claiming the entire territory of former Mandatory Palestine. Dissidents continued to demand that Arafat be removed from the organization's leadership and criticized his performance. The fight in Tripoli led to the birth of two distinct factions: the Fatah loyalists and a small pro-Iraq group, the Arab Liberation Front, favoring diplomatic initiatives, and a connection with Jordan. The National Alliance, consisting of the dissidents from Fatah, As-Sa'iqa, the PFLP-GC, the Popular Struggle Front, who received support from Damascus and called for armed struggle.

However, the siege actually boosted Arafat's image in the Arab world, while presenting Syria and the PLO dissidents as the aggressors. The international reputation of Said al-Muragha as well as his followers was permanently damaged due to the battle of Tripoli, and, aside of Syria, no country would ever accept them as legitimate representatives of the PLO. Regardless, they remained the militarily dominant force among the Palestinian militants in Lebanon, and again defeated Arafat's loyalists during the War of the Camps of 1985–1988.

=== Legacy ===
Although the PLO attempted to return to Lebanon in the next years, and some local groups continued to pledge allegiance to Arafat, the 1983 battle marked the de facto end of the PLO's influence in the country.

== See also ==
- Lebanese Civil War
- Mountain War (Lebanon)
- War of the Camps
- 2nd Infantry Brigade (Lebanon)
- United Nations Security Council Resolution 542
