= Democratic Alliance (Palestine) =

- Founded: 1980s

The Democratic Alliance (in Arabic: التحالف الديمقراطي) was an alliance of Palestinian PLO factions during the 1980s. The constituents of the alliance were the Democratic Front for the Liberation of Palestine, the Popular Front for the Liberation of Palestine, the Palestinian Communist Party and the Palestine Liberation Front (Yakub faction).

The Alliance opposed the Amman Agreement between Yassir Arafat and King Hussein in 1985. The Alliance was dissolved as PFLP and PLF left it in 1985, and joined the pro-Syrian Palestine National Salvation Front instead.
