= Bahjat Abu Gharbieh =

Palestinian politician (born 1916)

Personal details
- Born: 1916
- Died: 2012 (aged 95–96)
- Party: Ba'ath

Bahjat Abu Gharbiah (Arabic: بهجت ابو غربية; 1916–2012) was a Palestinian politician. He is the co-founder of the branch of the Ba'ath Party in Ramallah, one of the most active branches in the West Bank. He was in many armed resistance and diplomatic positions in Palestine.

== Biography ==
Bahjat was born in Khan Yunis in 1916, from a family originally from Hebron. He participated in the armed resistance during the revolt of 1939 and the Nakba of 1948. He was also a leader of the Holy Liberation Army and in the battle of Al-Qastal in 1948. He founded a branch of the Baath Party in Ramallah and was a member of the main leadership of the party from 1949 to 1959. He was appointed as the inaugural members of the executive committee of the Palestine Liberation Organization (PLO) in August 1964, where he led the opposition party to the leader, Ahmad Shukeiri. He was also a member of the Palestinian National Council (PNC), and formed the People's Resistance Committee, together with Subhi Ghushah and Ishak Duzdar in Jerusalem in May 1967.

Bahjat was re-elected as a member of the PLO Executive Committee in 1971 to 1972. He ran in the PNC presidency election in 1977, but lost to Khaled Fahum. He gave a speech at a right to return rally in Amman in December 2001. He died on January 26, 2012.

== Works ==
Bahjat published a war memoir in Arabic published by the Institute of Palestine Studies in 1993, entitled - In the Midst of the Struggle for the Arab Palestinian Cause: The Memoirs of Freedom-Fighter Bahjat Abu Gharbieh, 1916-1949, which explains his role in the resistance of the Palestinian people especially during the Great Revolt (1936-1939) against the British and the 1948 War.

The second volume of his memoirs published by the Arab Institute for Research and Publication in 2005 covers his story during the period between the Nakbah and the Intifada (1949-2000).
