= Said al-Muragha =

Palestinian militant

Saeed Muragha
- سعيد مُراغة
- Born: 1927; Silwan, Mandatory Palestine
- Died: 29 January 2013 (aged 85–86); Damascus, Syria
- Burial place: Damascus, Syria
- Military career
- Allegiance: Jordan (1948-1970); PLO (1970-1983); Fatah al-Intifada (1983-2013)
- Branch: Royal Jordanian Army (1948–1970)
- Rank: Colonel
- Nickname: Abu Musa
- Conflicts: First Arab-Israeli War; Six-Day War; War of Attrition; Battle of Karameh; Jordanian Civil War; Lebanese Civil War; 1982 Lebanon War; Siege of Beirut; Battle of Tripoli; War of the Camps
- Other work: Secretary-General of Fatah al-Intifada

Colonel Saeed Musa Muragha (Arabic: سعيد موسى مُراغة ) (1927 – 29 January 2013) was a Palestinian militant leader who was the founder and leader of Fatah al-Intifada, until his death in 2013. He is well known among Palestinians as Abu Musa (Arabic: أبو موسى).

== Early life and military career ==
Muragha was born in Silwan, a Palestinian neighborhood in East Jerusalem. As a Palestinian, he joined the Jordanian Army in 1948 and rose to become commander of an artillery battalion in 1969. During this period he was sent to receive a military education at the prestigious British Sandhurst Military Academy. In October 1970, after the outbreak of Black September (also known as the Jordanian Civil War), he defected from the Jordanian Army and joined the Palestinian Liberation Organization (PLO) and relocated with most of the Palestinian Resistance groups to Lebanon. There he rose to command an alliance between the PLO and Lebanese militant groups, which fought the Syrians when Syria intervened in the Lebanese Civil War in 1976. In 1978, the Syrian government unsuccessfully attempted to assassinate him.

== Split with Arafat ==
Muragha became the deputy chief of operations for the PLO and led the PLO's defense of Beirut in 1982 during the 1982 Lebanon War. However he fell out with Yassir Arafat, head of Fatah and PLO, in May 1983. Muragha publicly complained over corrupt practices within the PLO, especially the promotion of political appointees loyal to Arafat to important military posts. He was also known for hardline views on Israel, and outspoken in his opposition to what he saw as Arafat's attempt to reach a negotiated solution to the conflict (see Rejectionist Front).

In November 1983, he was expelled from the PLO and formed the Fatah Uprising (or Fatah al-Intifada in Arabic) in opposition to Arafat. With the backing of Syria, who opposed any negotiations with Israel, Muragha led his groups to drive Arafat's PLO from northern Lebanon.

In 1984, he led Fatah Uprising to join the Palestinian National Alliance in Damascus in opposition to the PLO but failed to get a majority of Palestinian support. He would join the Palestinian National Salvation Front in 1985 and oppose the Oslo Accords in 1993. Muragha retired from his leadership role in the 1990s and would no longer be active from then on.
