= Zuheir Mohsen =

Palestinian leader of the As-Sa'iqa Ba'athist (1936 - 1979)

- زهير محسن
- Born: 1936; Tulkarm, Mandatory Palestine
- Died: 25 July 1979 (aged 42–43); Cannes, France
- Cause of death: Assassinated
- Occupation: Leader of the pro-Syria as-Sa'iqa faction of the Palestine Liberation Organization (PLO)
- Political party: As-Sa'iqa

Zuheir Mohsen (Arabic: زهير محسن; 1936 – 25 July 1979) was a Palestinian politician who was the leader of the Ba'athist As-Sa'iqa faction of the Palestine Liberation Organization (PLO) between 1971 and 1979.

Previously active in the Jordanian wing of the Ba'ath Party during the Jordanian rule of the West Bank, he was chosen for this position after defense minister Hafez al-Assad's 1969–70 takeover in Syria, which he had supported against the previously dominant government of Salah Jadid. Mohsen was also a member of the National Command of the Ba'ath Party.

== Early life and career ==
Mohsen was born in Tulkarm, Mandatory Palestine, now in the northern West Bank, where his father was the mukhtar (head of the town). He became involved in political activity at a young age, joining the Ba'ath party at the age of 17. Mohsen trained as a teacher but lost his job in 1957 after being arrested for "subversive activity". He subsequently spent time in Qatar, from where he was eventually deported as a result of his political activity, before making his way to Damascus where he helped form as-Sa'iqa.

Mohsen rose to the position of heading as-Sa'iqa thanks to his close links to Assad, who after taking power in Syria purged the movement of its leftist elements (bringing it ideologically closer to Fatah) and appointed Mohsen as its general secretary.

Journalist Robert Fisk stated that As-Saiqa under Mohsen during the Lebanese Civil War employed its energies against the PLO, seeing in June 1976 "The PLO in open combat within West Beirut against As-Saiqa, who had attacked Arafat's forces on orders from Damascus"

== Political views ==
As a member of the As-Sa'iqa faction, Mohsen followed the line of Ba'athist ideology, which interpreted the question of Palestine through a pan-nationalist sense which contradicted the PLO's official stance and charter that affirmed the independent existence of Palestinian Arabs as a nation which belongs to a single democratic state that consists of all of former Mandatory Palestine.

In a March 1977 interview with the Dutch newspaper Trouw, Mohsen made the following remark:

The Palestinian people does not exist … there is no difference between Jordanians, Palestinians, Syrians, and Lebanese. Between Jordanians, Palestinians, Syrians and Lebanese there are no differences. We are all part of one people, the Arab nation [...] Just for political reasons we carefully underwrite our Palestinian identity. Because it is of national interest for the Arabs to advocate the existence of Palestinians to balance Zionism. Only for political and tactical reasons do we speak today about the existence of a Palestinian people, since Arab national interests demand that we posit the existence of a distinct "Palestinian people" to oppose Zionism. For tactical reasons, Jordan, which is a sovereign state with defined borders, cannot raise claims to Haifa and Jaffa, while as a Palestinian, I can undoubtedly demand Haifa, Jaffa, Beer-Sheva and Jerusalem. Once we have acquired all our rights in all of Palestine, we must not delay for a moment the reunification of Jordan and Palestine.

The interviewer James Dorsey stated that "Mohsen's position is not that surprising. Listening to his political and ideological views, one sometimes cannot suppress the feeling that perhaps less has changed in the Arab world than was originally expected", referring to the decline of Pan-Arabism in the aftermath of the Six Day War in 1967.

== Assassination ==
Mohsen was killed by gunshots to his head as he left a casino in Cannes on 25 July 1979 and walked towards the apartment. Although the attack was blamed by various sources on Mossad, Palestinians, and Egypt, the gunmen were at first not identified. In 2018, Ronen Bergman claimed that it was the first assassination by a new Israeli combat union, called "The New Bayonet". According to Bergman; "The Mossad marked the hit down as a success." Both Yasir Arafat and Hafez al-Assad attended his funeral in Damascus on 29 July. He was initially succeeded as leader of As-Sa'iqa by Sami Attari.
