= Alliance of Palestinian Forces =

Alliance of political factions

Alliance of Palestinian Forces تحالف القوى الفلسطينية
- Dates active: Since 1993
- Groups: As-Sa'iqa; Fatah al-Intifada; Hamas; Palestinian Islamic Jihad; Palestinian Liberation Front (Abu Nidal Ashqar wing); Palestinian Popular Struggle Front (Khalid 'Abd al-Majid wing); Popular Front for the Liberation of Palestine – General Command; Revolutionary Palestinian Communist Party
- Headquarters: Damascus, Syria

The Alliance of Palestinian Forces (APF; Arabic: تحالف القوى الفلسطينية) is a Damascus-based loose political alliance of eight Palestinian organizations. The Alliance was created in Damascus in December 1993 by ten Palestinian factions opposed to the negotiations that led up to the Oslo Accords. Amongst the ten founding members all but Hamas were headquartered in Damascus. Eight of the founding members were previously members of the Palestine Liberation Organization (PLO), the other two being Hamas and Palestinian Islamic Jihad.

The Alliance calls for the liberation of all Palestinian lands. It has sometimes been referred to as the 'Damascus 10'.

== Formation ==
The idea of a new rejectionist Palestinian coalition emerged with the Madrid Israeli-Palestinian talks in 1991. In the process of building the new coalition, there had been disagreements between different factions on how it would function. Hamas had proposed a mechanism where the central command of the coalition would have 40 members, out of whom 40% would belong to Hamas, 40% would belong to other factions and the remaining 20% would be 'independents'. The Hamas proposal was rejected by several of the other factions. In the view of the secular factions, Hamas tried to replicate the experience of the Fatah dominance in PLO. In the end the factions agreed in December 1993 to form the Alliance of Palestinian Forces with each faction, regardless of size, would have two seats in the APF central command.

The founding platform of APF was based on the 1968 PLO Covenant and the 1974 PLO Program of Stages.

The first press conference of the new body was held at the PFLP-GC office in the Yarmouk Camp. The APF's first declaration denounced the Declaration of Principles signed by Yasser Arafat and Yitzhak Rabin. The coalition stated that the PLO no longer represented the Palestinian people and that the Oslo Accords were non-binding for the Palestinians.

== Members ==
The ten founding members of APF were:

- As-Sa'iqa
- Democratic Front for the Liberation of Palestine (DFLP)
- Fatah al-Intifada
- Hamas
- Palestinian Islamic Jihad
- Popular Front for the Liberation of Palestine (PFLP)
- Popular Front for the Liberation of Palestine – General Command (PFLP-GC)
- Palestinian Liberation Front (Abu Nidal Ashqar wing)
- Palestinian Popular Struggle Front (Khalid 'Abd al-Majid wing)
- Revolutionary Palestinian Communist Party (RPCP).

The two main secular factions, the PFLP and the DFLP, left the Alliance in 1998 as a result of their willingness to engage in dialogue with Yasser Arafat's Palestinian Authority.

== Split ==
The APF contained nationalist, leftist and Islamist currents, with widely different ideological objectives. Whilst the notion of armed struggle was a central concept in APF discourse, the Alliance failed to develop any strategic coordination of armed actions. The PFLP and DFLP split away from APF in 1998. In July 1999, Syrian government authorities issued an instruction to the Damascus-based factions to end armed actions, a move which meant that the idea of APF as a coordination of armed struggle was abandoned. Thus, by the time of the outbreak of the Second Intifada, the APF had been a largely marginalized structure.

== Lebanon Popular Committees ==
In Lebanon, the APF runs Popular Committees, parallel to the Popular Committees of the PLO. The Alliance of Palestinian Forces was able to achieve significant influence in Palestinian refugee camps during the period of Syrian military presence in Lebanon (which ended in 2005). Afterwards, there have been moves for reconciliation and coordination between the PLO and the APF in Lebanon.

== See also ==
- Rejectionist Front
- Palestinian Joint Operations Room
- Palestinian National and Islamic Forces
