= Palestinian Popular Struggle Front (1991) =

Political faction

Palestinian Popular Struggle Front (al-Majid faction)
- جبهة النضال الشعبي الفلسطيني
- Leader: Khalid ‘Abd al-Majid
- Dates active: 1991 – present
- Split from: Palestinian Popular Struggle Front
- Headquarters: Damascus
- Ideology: Socialism; Palestinian nationalism Anti-Zionism
- Part of: Alliance of Palestinian Forces
- Wars: the Israeli–Palestinian conflict and the Syrian Civil War

The Palestinian Popular Struggle Front, Khalid ‘Abd al-Majid faction is a Palestinian political faction formed and led by Khalid ‘Abd al-Majid. The group emerged in 1991 as a split from the Palestinian Popular Struggle Front, whose name it continued to use. ‘Abd al-Majid rejected the decision of the mainstream PPSF leader Samir Ghawshah to rejoin the PLO and to accept the Oslo Accords and the formation of the Palestinian National Authority.

The PPSF, ‘Abd al-Majid faction has been based in Damascus, Syria, and plays a negligible role in mainstream Palestinian politics, and is often seen as controlled by the Syrian government. The group is outside the PLO, but participates in the Palestinian National and Islamic Forces and the Damascus-based Alliance of Palestinian Forces.

The group formed an armed wing, the Palestinian Popular Jihad Brigades, in the Gaza Strip in July 2008. In October 2008, the group declared itself part of an alliance with the Nasser Brigades and the Palestinian Freedom Movement.

It has taken part in the Syrian Civil War on the side of the Syrian government, fighting against the Syrian opposition in the Siege of Eastern Ghouta, the Battle of Yarmouk Camp (2015), the Southern Damascus offensive (April–May 2018), and other battles. After the fall of the Assad regime in late 2024, the Syrian transitional government demanded that all Palestinian armed groups in Syria disarm themselves, dissolve their military formations, and instead focus on political and charitable work.
