= Khalid ʽAbd al-Majid =

Leader of the Palestinian Popular Struggle Front (1991) (PPSF 1991)
- Incumbent
- Assumed office 1992

Personal details
- Born: خالد عبد المجيد; 1960 (age 65–66)
- Party: Palestinian Popular Struggle Front (PPSF) (until 1992)
- Other political affiliations: Breakaway faction of the PPSF (since 1992)
- Occupation: Politician, Militia leader
- Known for: Leading a radical wing of the PPSF and breaking away to form a separate faction

Khalid ʽAbd al-Majid (Arabic: خالد عبد المجيد) is a Palestinian politician and militia leader. Since 1992, he heads a breakaway faction of the Palestinian Popular Struggle Front (PPSF), a minor left-wing group within the Palestine Liberation Organization (PLO).

The PPSF split after a 1991 decision by the organization's leader, Samir Ghawshah, to support Yassir Arafat's peace appeals to Israel. ʽAbd al-Majid led the radical wing of the organization, with Syrian and possibly Libyan support, as it broke away and rebased in Damascus, where he presently lives.

The ʽAbd al-Majid faction of the PPSF has little influence on Palestinian politics, and is believed to have become more or less subordinated to the Syrian government. It has no representation in the Palestinian National Authority (PNA), which it does not recognize as a legitimate representative of the Palestinians, as the PPSF argues it was set up through an illegitimate agreement, i.e. the 1993 Oslo Accords.
