= Palestinian Struggle Youth Union =

Symbol of the Palestinian Struggle Youth Union

The Palestinian Struggle Youth Union (Arabic: اتحاد شباب النضال الفلسطيني) is a youth organization in Palestine. It is the youth wing of the Palestinian Popular Struggle Front. Razak an-Namurah is the president of the organization.
