= Palestinian National Alliance =

Palestinian coalition

The Palestinian National Alliance (Arabic: التحالف الوطني الفلسطيني) was an alliance of Palestinian movements, founded in 1983. The Alliance consisted of the PFLP-GC, as-Saiqa, Palestinian Popular Struggle Front, Fatah al-Intifada, the Palestinian Liberation Front (Mohammad Miqdah wing) and the Palestinian Revolutionary Communist Party. The Alliance was dissolved in 1985, as the Palestinian National Salvation Front was formed.
