= Palestinian Liberation Front (Abu Nidal Ashqar wing) =

Palestinian Liberation Front جبهة التحرير الفلسطينية
- Leader: Abu Nidal Ashqar
- Founded: 1983
- Split from: Palestinian Liberation Front
- Headquarters: Damascus, Syria
- Ideology: Arab nationalism Arab socialism
- National affiliation: Alliance of Palestinian Forces

The Palestinian Liberation Front (Arabic: جبهة التحرير الفلسطينية), sometimes referred to as the Palestinian Liberation Front (Abu Nidal Ashqar wing) (Arabic: جبهة التحرير الفلسطينية (جناح أبو نضال الأشقر))), is a Palestinian political faction led by Abu Nidal Ashqar.

== Profile ==
The organization is based in Damascus. It has practically no presence inside Palestine proper. Ideologically the group follows an Arab nationalist line.

== History ==
The group emerged from a split in the Palestinian Liberation Front in Lebanon in 1983 as Col. Abu Musa revolted against Yasser Arafat's leadership and the old PLF was divided into three (one group led by Abu Abbas supported Yasser Arafat, one group led by Abd ul-Fattah Ghanim supported Abu Musa and the third group led by Talat Yaqub sought to remain neutral in this conflict). The PLF (Abu Nidal Ashqar wing) emerged from the latter group.

In 1983 the group joined the PFLP, DFLP and the Palestinian Communist Party in forming the Democratic Alliance in Aden. The Democratic Alliance expressed willingness to engage in dialogue with Arafat.

In January 1984 the PLF office in Damascus was stormed by the Ghanim faction and Talat Yaqub was held hostage. Yaqub was released after Syrian intervention and the Ghanim faction relocated to Libya.

The PLF (Talat Yaqub) broke relations with PLO over the Amman Agreement. Along with the PFLP, the group left the Democratic Alliance and joined the pro-Syrian Palestinian National Salvation Front instead. Relations with PLO were re-initiated at the start of the First Intifada. At the 18th session of the Palestinian National Council, a plan to reunify the Talat Yaqub and Abu Abbas wings was announced. In June 1988 a merger with the Abu Abbas faction was announced, with Talat Yaqub as general secretary and Abu Abbas as deputy general secretary. However, the two factions have continued to function separately.

== Leadership ==
Talat Yaqub became the general secretary of this PLF faction. Yaqub died in Algiers on November 17, 1988. After his death Yusuf Muqtah (Abu Nidal Ashqar) took over the leadership of the organization. He holds the title of Deputy General Secretary of the organization. As of 2010 Ali Aziz was a member of the political bureau of the organization. As of 2015 Mohammad Yassin was the representative of the organization in Lebanon. As of 2007 the representative of the organization in Sidon was Walid Jumaa.

== Relations to other factions ==
PLF (Talat Yaqub/Abu Nidal Ashqar wing) was a member of the Palestine Liberation Organization alongside the PLF (Abu Abbas wing). In 1993 the PLF (Abu Nidal Ashqar wing) rejected the Oslo Accords and left the PLO for the anti-Oslo Alliance of Palestinian Forces (APF).

== Armed wing ==
As of 1999 the organization claimed to have 200 fighters in South Lebanon, but that they had been put on reserve in 1993.
