= Palestinian National and Islamic Forces =

Military and political Palestinian coalition

Palestinian National and Islamic Forces القوى الوطنية والإسلامية الفلسطينية
- Abbreviation: PNIF
- Leader: Marwan Barghouti
- Founded: 2000
- Dissolved: 2005
- Ideology: Palestinian nationalism Anti-Zionism; Big tent
- National affiliation: PLO

The Palestinian National and Islamic Forces (Arabic: القوى الوطنية والإسلامية الفلسطينية) was a coalition formed shortly after the outbreak of the Second Intifada with the authorization of Yasser Arafat and led by Marwan Barghouti. The coalition coordinated the agenda of its members and helped plan and execute joint political actions against Israel. According to the Anti-Defamation League, the group enjoyed significant influence during the Second Intifada, but since the election of Mahmoud Abbas in 2005, it became less active.

The coalition included both PLO and non-PLO factions, some organizations are listed as terrorist in the West.

The group's committee included representatives of the following organizations:

- Palestinian National Liberation Movement (Fatah);
- Popular Front for the Liberation of Palestine (PFLP);
- Islamic Resistance Movement (Hamas);
- Democratic Front for the Liberation of Palestine (DFLP);
- Palestinian People's Party (PPP);
- Palestinian Democratic Union (FIDA);
- Palestinian Popular Struggle Front (PPSF, Khalid ‘Abd al-Majid faction);
- Palestinian Liberation Front (PLF);
- Islamic Jihad Movement in Palestine (PIJ);
- Arab Liberation Front (ALF);
- Palestinian Arab Front (PAF);
- Popular Front for the Liberation of Palestine – General Command (PFLP-GC);
- National Islamic Salvation Party;
- Popular Liberation War Pioneers (As-Sa'iqa)
- Palestine13 (P13);

== See also ==
- Israeli–Palestinian conflict
- Palestinian Joint Operations Room
