= Fatah al-Intifada =

Palestinian militant faction

Palestinian National Liberation Movement - "Fatah"
- "حركة التحرير الوطني الفلسطيني - "فتح
- Leaders: Col. Said al-Muragha (1983-2013); Ziad al-Saghir "Abu Hazim" (until 2025)
- Dates active: 1983 – present
- Split from: Fatah
- Headquarters: Damascus, Syria
- Active regions: Lebanon, Syria, West Bank, Jordan
- Ideology: Palestinian nationalism Arab socialism Anti-Zionism; Anti-imperialism
- Political position: Left-wing
- Size: 3,000–3,500
- Part of: Alliance of Palestinian Forces
- Wars: Lebanese Civil War; Syrian civil war Syrian civil war spillover in Lebanon; Gaza war

Fatah al-Intifada (Arabic: فتح الانتفاضة, lit. 'Fatah Uprising') is a Palestinian militant faction founded by Said Muragha, better known as Abu Musa. Officially it refers to itself as the Palestinian National Liberation Movement - "Fatah" (Arabic: حركة التحرير الوطني الفلسطيني- فتح), the identical name of the major Fatah movement. Fatah al-Intifada is not part of the Palestine Liberation Organization (PLO).

== History ==
=== Rupture with PLO ===
Originally part of Fatah, Fatah al-Intifada broke away from the organization in 1983, during the PLO's participation in the Lebanese Civil War. The split was due to differences between Abu Musa and Yasser Arafat over a number of issues, including military decisions and corruption. Fatah al-Intifada was formed with Syrian support and quickly attracted a number of Palestinian guerrillas disillusioned with Arafat's role in Fatah and the Palestine Liberation Organization (PLO). One of the leading figures joined the group from Fatah was Nimr Saleh. Syria provided extensive backing as the Abu Musa forces attacked Arafat loyalists in Fatah, while several radical PLO organizations in the Rejectionist Front stayed on the sidelines. Fatah al-Intifada took part in the Battle of Tripoli (1983). The fighting led to heavy losses on both sides, and helped Syria extend its influence into Palestinian-held areas of Lebanon.

=== War of the camps ===
In 1985–88, Fatah al-Intifada took part in the War of the camps, a Syrian attempt to root out the PLO from its refugee camp strongholds backed by the Shiite Amal militia and some Palestinian rejectionist factions. After a joint effort by the Syrian Army and a number of Palestinian and Lebanese groups controlled or supported by Damascus, including Fatah al-Intifada, the PFLP-GC, as-Sa'iqa, Amal, the Syrian PLA and parts of the Palestinian Liberation Front (PLF), the PLO was gradually expelled from Lebanon in the mid-to-late 1980s. By that time Fatah al-Intifada had been reduced to a minor part of Syria's network of militia proxies, with little or no independent decision-making.

=== Decline ===
In 1984 Abu Musa led Fatah al-Intifada to join the Palestinian National Alliance in Damascus in opposition to the PLO but failed to get a majority of Palestinian support. It would join the Palestinian National Salvation Front in 1985 and oppose the Oslo Accords in 1993. By the late 1980s, Fatah al-Intifada had a brief rapprochement with Arafat's Fatah, but due to its opposition to the Oslo Accords, and generally poor relations between the PLO and the Syrian government, Fatah al-Intifada has not been able to secure a role in today's Palestinian politics. Instead it remains a minor faction in the Palestinian refugee camps of Syria and Lebanon, where it was able to organize under the umbrella of the Syrian military presence until its end in 2005.

It remains very much a part of Syrian-sponsored efforts to influence Palestinian politics, regularly backing Syrian initiatives and being a core member of a Syrian-led coalition of Palestinian groups based in Damascus. In the Syrian Civil War, Fatah al-Intifada fought alongside the government against the Syrian opposition, and took part in the Siege of Eastern Ghouta, the Southern Damascus offensive (April–May 2018), and other battles. By 2018, however, it began to lay off its fighters due to the decreasing intensity of the civil war and lack of funds.

=== Gaza war ===
Fatah al-Intifada has been reported to be among the factions fighting in the Gaza war.

=== Fall of Assad ===
After the fall of the Assad regime in late 2024, the Syrian transitional government demanded that all Palestinian armed groups in Syria disarm themselves, dissolve their military formations, and instead focus on political and charitable work. Representatives of the new Syrian government also raided the offices of Fatah al-Intifada, as-Sa'iqa, and PFLP-GC, confiscating documents, equipment, and weapons. From 21 to 24 December, the Lebanese Armed Forces peacefully occupied some Fatah al-Intifada bases in Lebanon, with the local militants retreating without resistance.

=== Infighting ===
In February 2025, Fatah al-Intifada became subject to factional infighting: The party's central committee removed general secretary Ziad al-Saghir (alias "Abu Hazim") from his post due to "organizational violations", while also announcing the formation of an emergency body to manage the party. Ziad al-Saghir responded by suspending the central committee's operations and declared the dismissal of two party leaders who had agreed to his own removal, namely Rumeidh Abu Hani (head of Fatah al-Intifada's Lebanon branch) and Yasser Al-Masri Abu Omar (head of Fatah al-Intifada's Syria branch).

== Ideology ==
The aims of the Fatah al-Intifada movement are the "liberation of Palestine by both armed struggle and armed resistance, and the establishment of the independent Palestine state with noble Jerusalem as its capital". There was also a political dimension: the organization took a more leftist view than the generally apolitical Fatah, and used socialist rhetoric. Abu Musa is known to have advocated the view that the Lebanese Civil War was not a sectarian conflict, but a form of class war.

== See also ==
- List of armed groups in the Syrian Civil War
