= Isam al-Qadi =

Palestinian Ba'thist politician

- عصام القاضي

Head of as-Sa'iqa faction of the Palestine Liberation Organization
- In office 1979–2006

Personal details
- Died: 2006
- Resting place: Damascus
- Party: As-Sa'iqa
- Occupation: Politician

Isam al-Qadi (Arabic: عصام القاضي) (died in 2006) was a Palestinian Ba'thist politician aligned with the Syrian government. He was head of the Syrian-controlled as-Sa'iqa faction of the Palestine Liberation Organization (PLO) between 1979 and until his death in 2006. He lived and was buried in Damascus.
