= Arabi Awwad =

Palestinian communist politician

Arabi Musa Awwad

Secretary of the West Bank section of the Jordanian Communist Party
- In office 1967–1982

General Secretary of the Revolutionary Palestinian Communist Party
- In office 1982–2015

Personal details
- Born: 1928 Salfit, Palestine
- Died: 20 March 2015 (aged 86–87) Amman, Jordan
- Education: Arab College in Jerusalem
- Profession: Politician, Arabic Literature Teacher

Arabi Musa Awwad (1928 – 20 March 2015) (Arabic: عربي موسى عواد), kunya Abu Fahd, was a Palestinian communist politician. He was a member of the Central Committee of the Palestinian National Liberation League and later the Jordanian Communist Party. Awwad was designated as secretary of the West Bank section of the Jordanian Communist Party after the Six-Day War in 1967 and emerged as a key leader of the Palestinian National Front. He spent over a decade in Jordanian and Israeli prisons and detention centers and was deported to Jordan in 1973. Awwad was elected to the Palestinian National Council and included in the Palestinian Central Council. In 1982, he founded the Revolutionary Palestinian Communist Party and became its general secretary. Awwad died in Amman, Jordan, in 2015.

== Life ==
Awwad was born in Salfit. He graduated from the Arab College in Jerusalem in 1947.

He became a member of the Central Committee of the Palestinian National Liberation League. As an Arabic Literature teacher in Nablus he was active in student protests.

In 1955 he was included in the Central Committee of the Jordanian Communist Party. After the Six-Day War in 1967, Awwad was designated as secretary of the West Bank section of the Jordanian Communist Party. Awwad was the leader of the radical wing of the party.

He emerged as of the key leaders of the Palestinian National Front, which organized mass struggles inside the occupied territories. Israeli authorities charged him with membership in the Communist Party. He spent over a decade in Jordanian and Israeli prisons and detention centres. Awwad was deported to Jordan on 10 December 1973 along with other PNF leaders.

He was elected to the Palestinian National Council at its tenth session in Cairo in 1974, and included in the Palestinian Central Council. Awwad represented the PNF in the PLO Unified Information Centre. In 1979 he became a politburo member of the Jordanian Communist Party.

In 1982 Awwad founded the Revolutionary Palestinian Communist Party and became its general secretary. The RPCP took part in the armed resistance against the Israeli invasion in Lebanon, Awwad's son Fahd Awwad was killed during the war.

Awwad died in Amman, Jordan on 20 March 2015.
