= Reform and Development Party (Palestine) =

Reform and Development Party حزب الإصلاح والتنمية
- Founded: 1 May 2019

The Reform and Development Party (Arabic: حزب الإصلاح والتنمية) is a Palestinian political party that is backed by Ashraf Jabari, Khader al-Jabari, Issa Allan, Khaldoun al-Husseini, Sharaf Ghanem and Nasser al-Tamimi.
