= 2004–05 Palestinian local elections =

Election in the Palestinian territories

Municipal elections were held between December 2004 and December 2005, to elect members of local councils in the Palestinian Territories. The elections were approved by President Yasser Arafat of the Palestinian National Authority (PNA), before his death on 11 November 2004. They were administered by the Higher Committee for Local Elections (HCLE), a body established under the authority of the Ministry for Local Government, an institution of the Palestinian National Authority.

It were the first local elections held by the PNA. Previous municipal elections were held in 1972 and 1976, organized by the Israeli occupation power.

== Proceeding ==
The elections were scheduled to take place in five rounds, but the fifth was not carried out, because of the situation in Palestinian Territories after the formation of a Hamas-led government. Approximately 25% of Palestinians lived in districts that did not have elections.

- The first round of elections was held in two parts; the first part on 23 December 2004 in 22 localities in the West Bank and the second on 27 January 2005 in 14 localities in the Gaza Strip. The seats were allocated according to the simple majority system (districts).
- The second round was held on 5 May 2005 in 76 localities in the West Bank and 6 in the Gaza Strip. The seats were again allocated according to the simple majority system (districts).
- The third round of local elections was held on 29 September 2005 in 104 localities in the West Bank only. In this round the seats were allocated according to the proportional representation system (lists).
- The fourth round of local elections was held on 15 December 2005 in 37 population centers in the West Bank and 3 in the Gaza Strip. Seats were also allocated in this round according to the proportional representation system (lists). In some districts elections were canceled.

In the first two rounds, council members were elected by Bloc voting election system, and the third and fourth by Party-list proportional representation.

=== Jerusalem Governorate ===
The Jerusalem electoral district was divided into two zones:

- The area of East Jerusalem annexed by Israel with 250,000 Palestinians, holding Israeli ID cards.
- The remaining area with 27 Palestinian residential localities, which were occupied, but not annexed.

== Results ==
=== Beit Jala ===
In Beit Jala, six seats went to the United Beit Jala list (Fatah and one member of the Palestinian People's Party), five seats went to Sons of the Land (PFLP and independents), one seat went to Independent Beit Jala Group and one candidate was elected as an independent. The top candidate of the Sons of the Land list was Nadir Antoun Issa Abu Ashma, while the top candidate of the United Beit Jala list was Raji George Jadallah Zeidan.

== International observation ==
The elections were observed by a Council of Europe team headed by Jean-Claude Frécon at an early stage and later by Christopher Newbury. He announced on 16 December 2005 "We have seen an impressive improvement in the organisation of the voting process during the fourth phase of local elections in the Palestinian Territories, compared to previous phases...Inside the polling stations, the Congress observed a free and fair election. Outside them, further improvements remain to be made."

In the December 2005 round of elections, the observation teams visited 130 polling stations in Al-Bireh, Gaza, Jenin, Nablus, and Ramallah.

== See also ==
- Municipal election in Bethlehem, 2005
