= Children of the Siege =

1988 book by Pauline Cutting

- Author: Pauline Cutting
- Genre: Non-fiction
- Publisher: William Heinemann
- Publication date: 1988

Children of the Siege is a book by Pauline Cutting. It was first published in 1988 by William Heinemann.

== Summary ==
The book is an account of Cutting's time, 1985–1987, working as a surgeon in the Palestinian refugee camp of Bourj al-Barajneh, in southern Beirut for Medical Aid for Palestinians. Having responded to an advert in the British Medical Journal, Cutting arrived in Beirut in December 1985.

At this period the Bourj al-Barajneh camp was under siege by Amal militia. Amal had been set up in 1974 by Musa Sadr and was the closest ally in Lebanon of the Syrian regime of Hafez al-Assad. Their tanks bombarded the camp and their snipers attacked the Palestinians. The book opens with the description of an Amal sniper attack on a young boy. Cutting wrote; "I was appalled by the brutality of Amal." By mid-January 1987, the camp starving, some feared a repeat of the 1976 Tel al-Zaatar massacre - when an east Beirut Palestinian refugee camp had been surrounded by the Phalangists - aided by the Syrians.

The book is also an account of her meeting the Dutch doctor Ben Alofs and of their growing closeness - signalled by Alofs bringing her a copy of Ernest Hemingway's A Farewell to Arms - the story of a romance with a British nurse.

Though she arrived for humanitarian reasons by the summer of 1986 she says she had developed a strong sympathy for the Palestinian cause.

== Reception ==
The New York Times described the book as being a clearly written account of the Beirut crisis, and stated that it was a "a frightening and inspiring account of the hour-by-hour struggle of life in a war zone". Publishers Weekly stated that the book "captures the spirit in which doctors and nurses from all parts of the world labored to save lives", and that "it will leave readers filled with admiration for those humanitarians who offered help in a hostile, politically and religiously complex environment".
