= Ahd Bloc =

- Founded: 2005
- Ideology: Socialism
- Political position: Left-wing
- National affiliation: DFLP; PPSF; ALF

Ahd Bloc (Arabic: كتلة العهد) was a joint list of Democratic Front for the Liberation of Palestine, Palestinian Popular Struggle Front, Arab Liberation Front and independents for the May 2005 municipal elections in Bethlehem, the West Bank. In total, the Bloc presented 9 candidates (5 Christians and 4 Muslims). The top candidate of the Bloc was Dr. Peter Qumri, director of Beit Jala Hospital.
