= Freedom and Social Justice =

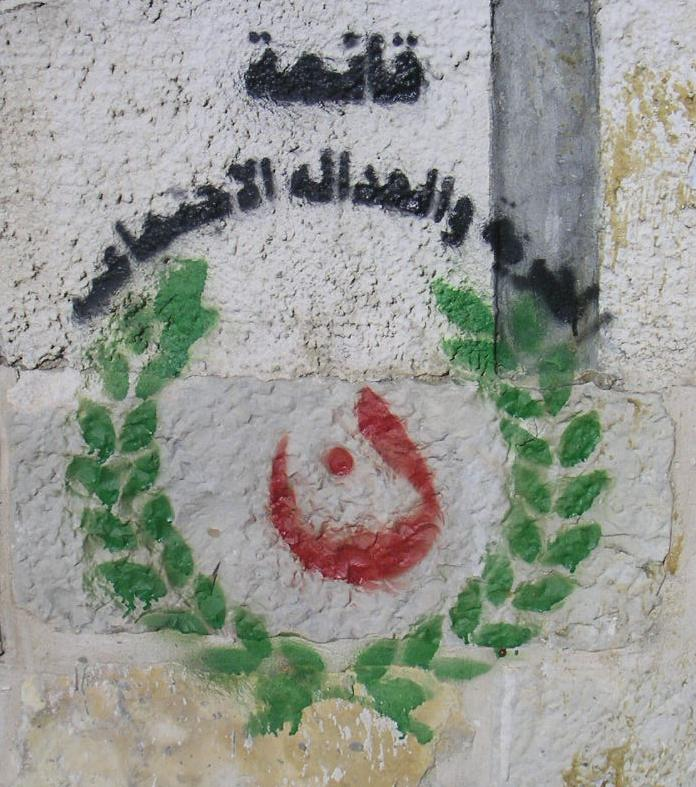
'Freedom and Social Justice' electoral stencil in Ramallah

Freedom and Social Justice was a coalition that contested the 2006 Palestinian legislative elections. It was constituted by Palestinian Popular Struggle Front, Kafi Movement and the Palestinian Green Party.

The coalition failed to win a seat. In total their list got 7,127 votes (0.72%).
