= Palestinian National Salvation Front =

Palestinian coalition

Palestinian National Salvation Front جبهة الانقاذ الوطني الفلسطيني
- Dates active: 1985–1991
- Groups: (Popular Front for the Liberation of Palestine) PFLP; PFLP–GC as-Sa'iqa (Palestine) Palestinian Popular Struggle Front; Palestinian Liberation Front (Talat Yaqub wing); Fatah al-Intifada
- Active regions: Lebanon
- Wars: Lebanese Civil War

The Palestinian National Salvation Front (Arabic: جبهة الانقاذ الوطني الفلسطيني) (PNSF) was a coalition of Palestinian factions. The creation of the Palestinian National Salvation Front was announced on March 25, 1985, by Khalid al-Fahum. The front consisted of the PFLP, PFLP-GC, as-Sa'iqa, the Palestinian Popular Struggle Front, the Palestinian Liberation Front (Talat Yaqub wing) and Fatah al-Intifada. The Front was founded in reaction to the Amman Accord between Yasser Arafat and King Hussein of Jordan.

The Palestinian National Salvation Front accused the PLO leadership of "surrenderism". It was stressed on behalf of the Front that it was not seeking to replace the PLO, but that its foundation was a temporary measure.

During the War of the Camps the PNSF had its headquarters in Mar Elias refugee camp, which was not one of the camps under siege by Amal.

In 1991, the PLO invited the Palestinian National Salvation Front to Tunis for reconciliation talks.
