= United Bethlehem Bloc =

Symbol of the United Bethlehem Bloc, the houses in the bottom form the word baladna, Arabic for 'our town'

United Bethlehem Bloc (Arabic: كتلة بيت لحم الموحدة, Kutla Beit Laham Al-Muwahida) was a joint list of Fatah, Palestinian People's Party and independents for the May 2005 municipal elections in Bethlehem, West Bank. In total, the Bloc presented 15 candidates. The top candidate of the Bloc was Antun Salman, an independent. A section of Fatah in the city dissatisfied with the candidature of the Bloc launched a separate electoral list, the Hope and Labour Bloc.
