= Hope and Labour Bloc =

Symbol of the Hope and Labour Bloc. Slogan reads 'For you O Bethlehem'

The Hope and Labour Bloc (Arabic: كتلة الأمل والعمل) was a candidature list that contested the May 2005 municipal elections in Bethlehem, the West Bank. The Bloc was launched by a dissident grouping of Fatah, which officially backed the United Bethlehem Bloc. In total, the Hope and Labour Bloc presented 12 candidates. The top candidate of the Bloc was Zughbi Zughbi.
