= Ahmed Majdalani =

Palestinian politician and university teacher

- أحمد مجدلاني
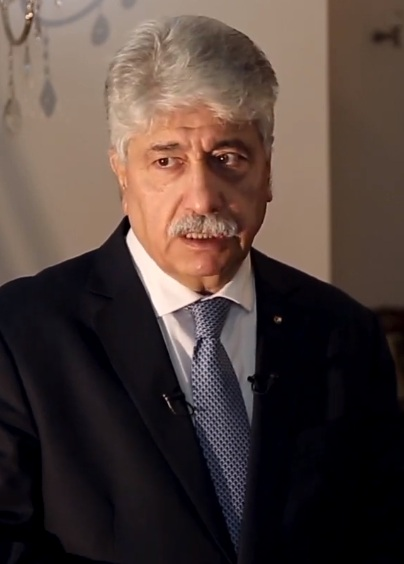
- Majdalani in 2021

Personal details
- Born: 1956 (age 69–70) Damascus, Syria
- Occupation: Secretary-General of Palestinian Popular Struggle Front (2009–present); Minister Without Portfolio (2005–2006); Minister of Labor (2009–2011)

Ahmed Majdalani (Arabic: أحمد مجدلاني; born 1956) is a Palestinian politician, university professor and researcher. A former Palestinian government minister, he currently serves as Secretary-General of the Palestinian Popular Struggle Front (PPSF) and is a senior member of the PLO Executive Committee which is considered the highest political level in Palestine.

== Early life ==
Majdalani was born to Palestinian parents in Damascus, Syria in 1956. He enrolled in the Social Sciences Academy in Sofia, Bulgaria, where he graduated with a PhD in political economics.

== Political career ==
Majdalani is a member of the Palestinian National Council and the Executive Committee of the Palestine Liberation Organization (PLO). In 1998, he served as the Director-General of Arab and International Relations for the Palestinian National Authority.

On 12 August 2009, following the death of Samir Ghawshah five days prior, Majdalani became Secretary-General of the Palestinian Popular Struggle Front (PPSF) after being elected by his party colleagues. Afterward, he stated that his goals were to strengthen Palestinian democratic institutions and encourage elections that would end the strife between Hamas, which controls the Gaza Strip, and Fatah, the dominant Palestinian faction in the West Bank.

=== Palestinian minister ===
Majdalani was appointed the government post of Minister of State in the 9th Palestinian government from February 2005 to March 2006, where his primary task was dealing with issues regarding the West Bank barrier.

He served as the Minister of Labor for the West Bank-based Palestinian Authority. He was appointed the post by Mahmoud Abbas, the Palestinian president, on 19 May 2009.

In December 2011, Majdalani resigned from his position after a scandal that arose following words he said, without knowing that he was being recorded, against government organizations.

On 13 April 2019, he was appointed Minister of Social Development in State of Palestine Government of April 2019.

== Academic career ==
Majdalani is a professor of philosophy and cultural studies for Birzeit University located north of Ramallah. He has authored three research studies: The Serious Threats Facing the Palestinian National Project (2007), The Arab Peace Initiative: An Option or Strategy for Peacemaking? (2007), and A Unilateral Declaration of Independence (2008).
