= Bethlehem Brotherhood and Development =

Political party alliance in the State of Palestine

Electoral propaganda of the bloc

Bethlehem Brotherhood and Development (Arabic: بيت لحم تآخي وتطوير) was a candidature bloc that contested the May 2005 municipal elections in Bethlehem, the West Bank. Politically independent, the list included members of the Popular Front for the Liberation of Palestine. In total, the bloc presented 15 candidates (8 Christians and 7 Muslims). The top candidate of the Bloc was Victor Batarseh, who was elected mayor.
