= Samir Ghawshah =

Palestinian politician

Samir Ghawshah سمير غوشة

Personal details
- Born: 1937 Jerusalem, British Mandate of Palestine
- Died: August 3, 2009 (aged 71–72) Amman, Jordan
- Occupation: Secretary-General of Palestinian Popular Struggle Front (1971-2009); Minister of Labor (1994-98); Orient House Director (2002-03)

Samir Ghawshah also spelled Samir Ghosha (Arabic: سمير غوشة, 1937–August 3, 2009), was a Palestinian politician and militia leader. He was the head of the Secretary-General of the Palestinian Popular Struggle Front (PPSF) and member of the Palestine Liberation Organization Executive Committee. Ghawsha also served in the Palestinian National Authority as Minister of Labor and later on Minister of Jerusalem.

== Life ==
Ghawshah was born in Jerusalem in 1937 and received his elementary and secondary education there. He obtained a BA in dentistry from the University of Damascus in Syria. He joined the pan-Arabism movement when he was young. After the Palestinian exodus, he co-founded the PPSF and was elected its secretary-general in 1971. Frequently in opposition to Yasser Arafat's policies (being a part of the Rejectionist Front), it also received backing from a number of Arab governments, especially Syria and Libya.

In 1991, Ghousha was elected a member of the PLO's executive committee, where he represented the party. The PPSF broke apart when talks between Israel and Palestinians began in Madrid in 1991, with Ghawshah heading the more moderate faction and returning to the favor of Arafat. Ghawshah's PPSF accepted the Oslo Agreement and he served as Minister of Labor in the resulting Palestinian National Authority (PNA) from 1994, but resigned in 1998 in protest of "corruption and the lack of a joint Palestinian strategy." He published his resignation in a letter, complaining of irregularities in the PNA's system of governance, and of apparent examples of corruption He continued to serve as Minister without Portfolio, but from 1999 had no ministerial post. He was present at the Camp David negotiations of 2000 as an adviser to Arafat, and briefly returned as Minister for Jerusalem, formally known as the Orient House Director, in the PNA between late October 2002 and April 2003.

== Death ==
Ghawsha died in an Amman hospital on 3 August 2009 at the age of 72 due to complications from cancer. His will was to be buried in Jerusalem but Israel refused it. Instead he was buried in Martyr's Square in al-Bireh. The funeral procession began at the Governmental Hospital in Ramallah, and his body was transported on an official military vehicle with Palestinian Presidential Guards securing the convoy. The mourners, who included Yasser Abed Rabbo and Mahmoud Abbas' representative Ahmad Abdel Rahman, traveled past Ghawshah's family home, then to the Mukataa in Ramallah for an official ceremony. PPSF colleague Ahmed Majdalani succeeded Ghawshah as secretary-general on August 8.
