= Reform Bloc =

Symbol of the Reform Bloc

Reform Bloc (Arabic: كتلة الاصلاح, Kutla Al-Islah) was a candidature list that contested the May 2005 municipal elections in Bethlehem, the West Bank. The list was launched by Hamas. In total, the Bloc presented 7 candidates. The top candidate of the Bloc was Hassan al-Masalman.
