= Wafaa Bloc =

2005 Bethlehem electoral alliance

Electoral propaganda of the Wafaa Bloc

Wafaa Bloc (Arabic: كتلة الوفاء) was a candidature list that contested the May 2005 municipal elections in Bethlehem, the West Bank. The list was officially supported by the Islamic Jihad Movement in Palestine. In total, the Bloc presented 4 candidates. The top candidate of the Bloc was Nasser Isa Hassan Shauka.
