= As-Sa'iqa =

As-Sa'iqa الصَّاعِقَة
- Leader: Mohammed Qeis
- Founded: September 1966
- Membership: 7,000 (1970); 2,000 (1980)
- Ideology: Pan-Arabism; Neo-Ba'athism
- Political position: Far-left
- National affiliation: Palestine Liberation Organization; Alliance of Palestinian Forces
- Regional affiliation: Syrian-led Ba'ath Party
- Colors: Black, Red, White and Green (Pan-Arab colors)
- Palestinian Legislative Council: 0 / 132

Party flag

As-Sa'iqa (Arabic: الصَّاعِقَة, romanized: aṣ-Ṣāʽiqa, lit. 'Thunderbolt'), officially known as Vanguard for the Popular Liberation War – Lightning Forces, (Arabic: طَلائِع حَرْب التَّحْرِير الشَّعْبِيَّة - قُوَّات الصَّاعِقَة, romanized: Ṭalāʼiʽ Ḥarb at-Taḥrīr aš-Šaʽbiyya - Quwwāt aṣ-Ṣāʽiqa) is a Palestinian Ba'athist political and military faction created by Syria. It is linked to the Palestinian branch of the Syrian-led Ba'ath Party, and is a member of the broader Palestine Liberation Organization (PLO), although it is no longer active in the organization. Its Secretary-General is Dr. Mohammed Qeis.

== History ==
=== Background ===
==== 1966 coup in Syria ====
As-Sa'iqa's roots go back to the 1966 coup d'état in Syria. This military coup overthrew National Command purged the Ba'ath Party (which had come to power three years earlier) of its "old guard" and the founders of Ba'athism in general, sending people like Michel Aflaq and Salah ad-Din al-Bitar into exile and sentencing them to death in absentia.

==== New regime's policy ====
The coup brought to power the most radical Ba'athist faction, which later became known as neo-Ba'athism. The main ideologist of neo-Ba'athism and organizer of the 1966 coup was the military general Salah Jadid, who began indirect but complete rule of Syria. Jadid was very radical, and carried out the same radical policies, both domestic and foreign. Domestically, he actively promoted and tried to harshly implement ideas bordering on communism, actively persecuted any religion, and intensified state terror in the country. In a result, Jadid successfully built a totalitarian and Marxist–Leninist state (sometimes called "Neo-Marxist" by outside observers) with brutal repression. Outwardly, he moved closer to the Soviet Union and pursued very aggressive, provocative and in many ways reckless rhetoric against Israel. At the same time, his relations with much of the Arab world were also poor: his neo-Ba'athist regime was basically indifferent to pan-Arab issues except for Palestine, and almost all of the Jadid's rule Syria was isolated from most of the Arab states.

The Jadid's regime pursued hardline policies and calling for the mobilization of a people's war (Maoist guerilla tactics) against Zionism, which was expressed in its huge support for leftist Palestinian fedayeen groups, granting them considerable autonomy and allowing them to carry out attacks on Israel from Syrian territory: Jadid continued supporting that concept even after catasrophic Six-Day War in 1967. Israel has repeatedly accused Syria of supporting Palestinian groups and their acts of violence. At the end of May 1967, the headlines of Syrian newspapers clearly stated that for the neo-Ba'athist regime, war was the only solution to the "Israeli problem". According to Israeli sources, the regime in Syria initiated 177 border incidents and aided 75 Palestinian terrorist incidents between 23 February 1966 and 15 May 1967.

=== Early years ===
==== Formation of as-Sa'iqa ====
Just a few months after the coup, in September, Jadid's regime completed the formation of the Palestinian paramilitary Ba'athist group called as-Sa'iqa, which carried out attacks on Israel from Jordanian and Lebanese territory, but was completely under the control of the neo-Ba'athist regime in Syria. As-Sa'iqa became a very important guerrilla group for the Jadid regime: it was present in neighboring Arab countries and also diminished the role of other fedayeen groups in Syria that were not created by him. For example, after the creation of as-Sa'iqa, Fatah (another fedayeen group), under Syrian pressure, was forced to move its bases and training camps from Syria to Jordan. Syria-controlled as-Saiqa successfully replaced the uncontrolled Fatah. The group became active in December 1968, as a member of the PLO. Syria tried to build up an alternative to Yasser Arafat, who was then emerging with his Fatah faction as the primary Palestinian fedayeen leader and politician. As-Sa'iqa was initially the second-largest group within the PLO, after Fatah.

==== Assadist-Jadidist split ====
After the Six-Day War, the conflict between Jadid and Hafez al-Assad, the defense minister, became very intense. Assad believed that Jadid's radicalism and aggressive policies had failed Syria and that a more moderate approach to the domestic and foreign policy situation was required. Although Jadid's regime gave a lot of support to the leftist fedayeen, Assad already then considered this a bad decision. In Assad's opinion, the militants were given too much autonomy in attacks on Israel, which provoked the Six-Day War: he demanded a strong reduction in the autonomy of the fedayeen and the transfer of control over them to the army. Assad also disagreed with the very essence of the concept of "people's war" promoted by Jadid.

The conflict often escalated from heated verbal disputes to military clashes between supporters of both sides: for example in 1969, Assad staged something very much like a coup, during which an important ally of Jadid and the director of the National Security Bureau (the central command of all Syrian mukhabarats, i.e. intelligence services) Abdul-Karim al-Jundi shot himself. Since the start of the conflict between Assad and Jadid, the Palestinian fedayeen have become another lever for the various factions who struggle for power. For example, as-Sa'iqa for those years had expanded into a large militia of thousands of fighters by 1969: Jadid used it as a counterweight to armed Assad's supporters.

=== Al-Assad takeover and Purge of As-Sa'iqa ===
As a result, as-Sa'iqa was unable to help Jadid stay in power. When al-Assad seized power in the November 1970 "Corrective Revolution", as-Sa'iqa was purged and its leaders replaced with al-Assad loyalists (although Jadid loyalists held on to the as-Sai'qa branch active in the Palestinian refugee camps in Jordan until mid-1971, when they were arrested). As new Secretary-General (after Mahmud al-Ma'ayta, who had succeeded Yusuf Zuayyin), al-Assad chose Zuheir Mohsen, a Palestinian Ba'thist who had come to Syria as a refugee from Jordan. He was repeatedly promoted by Syria as a candidate for the post of PLO chairman, to replace Arafat, but never gained support from other factions. By some estimates, by 1983, about 70 percent of all as-Sa'iqa militants were Syrians.

=== With and against the PLO in Lebanon ===
As-Sa'iqa was used by Syria as a proxy force in the Palestinian movement. While this has prevented as-Sa'iqa from gaining widespread popularity among Palestinians, it became an important force in the Palestinian camps in Syria, as well as in Lebanon. During the Lebanese Civil War, Syria built the movement into one of the most important Palestinian fighting units, but also forced it to join in Syrian offensives against the PLO when relations between al-Assad and Arafat soured. This led to as-Sa'iqa's expulsion from the PLO in 1976, but it was readmitted in December the same year, after the situation had cooled down, and after Syria named this as a condition for further support for the PLO. The attacks on the PLO led to large-scale defections of Syrian-based Palestinians from the movement. As-Saiqa was also responsible for the Damour massacre in 1976 and many other mass murders.

After Muhsin's assassination in 1979, Isam al-Qadi became the new Secretary-General. The movement remained active during the Lebanese Civil War, and again joined Syria, the Lebanese Shi'a Amal Movement and Abu Musa's Fatah al-Intifada in attacks on the PLO during the War of the Camps in 1984–85, and for the remainder of the Civil War (which lasted until 1990). This again led to mass-defections of Palestinians from the movement (Harris quotes the Syrian-aligned Amal Movement as complaining that the Syrian-backed Palestinian forces sent to attack the PLO were "Abu Musa in the Biqa'" but "become Abu nothing in the Shuf and Abu Ammar on arrival in Beirut"), and reportedly its ranks were filled with non-Palestinian Syrian army recruits. After the end of the Civil War, the movement was nearly out of contact with the PLO mainstream, and exerted influence only in Syria and in Syrian-occupied parts of Lebanon. It kept lobbying within the PLO against the various peace proposals advanced by Arafat, and was part of the Syrian-based National Alliance that opposed Arafat.

=== As-Sai'qa today ===
After the end of the Lebanese Civil War and the 1993 signing of the Oslo Peace Agreement, as-Sai'qa has largely lost its usefulness to the Syrian government, and the state and size of the organization deteriorated. Today, it is wholly insignificant outside Syria, although it retains a presence in Lebanon (its future is uncertain after the end in 2005 of the Syrian Army's presence in Lebanon). It is extremely weak in the West Bank and Gaza Strip, non-existent in the Golan Heights, East Jerusalem and Israel within the Green Line, and has not been active during the al-Aqsa Intifada. Its importance to Syria has lessened, both because the PLO has diminished in importance compared to the Palestinian National Authority. As-Sai'qa boycotts PNA bodies, and its representative on the PLO Executive Committee also boycotts its sessions.

Following the outbreak of the Syrian Civil War in 2011, as-Sa'iqa took up arms in support of the Syrian Ba'athist government, participating in numerous military operations such as the Southern Damascus offensive (April–May 2018), and the 2018 Southern Syria offensive. Having greatly diminished in numbers, the organization's forces had suffered just 30 fighters killed in action by April 2018. By August 2018, As-Sa'iqa began to lay off a substantial number of its fighters, mostly because they were no longer needed and because of lack of funds.

After the fall of the Assad regime in late 2024, the Syrian transitional government demanded that all Palestinian armed groups in Syria disarm themselves, dissolve their military formations, and instead focus on political and charitable work. Representatives of the new government also raided the offices of as-Sa'iqa, PFLP-GC, and Fatah al-Intifada, confiscating documents, equipment, and weapons. The new Syrian government ultimately allowed as-Sa'iqa to continue its political activities, with the party reshuffling its leadership "to strengthen the faction's Palestinian role". On 8 February 2025, as-Sa'iqa reopened its offices in the Al-A'edeen Camp in Hama, prompting protests by locals who demanded that the party be held responsible for violations during the civil war.

== Secretary-Generals ==
- Zuheir Mohsen (1971–1979)
- Isam al-Qadi (1979–2006)
- Farhan Abu Al-Hayja (2007–2018)
- Mohammed Qeis (2018–present)

== Organization and structure ==
As-Sa'iqa
- الصاعقة
- Leaders: Zuheir Mohsen; Isam al-Qadi; Farhan Abu Al-Haija; Mohammed Qeis
- Dates active: 1966–1991; 2011–2018
- Headquarters: Damascus
- Active regions: Syria, Lebanon
- Ideology: Pan-Arabism; Neo-Ba'athism
- Part of: Palestine Liberation Organization; Alliance of Palestinian Forces

Since 2007, Farhan Abu Hayja has been Secretary-General of as-Sa'iqa. Muhammad al-Khalifa is its representative on the PLO Executive Committee, but boycotts sessions of the PLO EC. During much of the 1970s, as-Sai'qa's representatives in the PLO EC (Muhsin and al-Qadi) held the prestigious and sensitive post of Head of the Military Department, which reflected the military importance of the movement in those years.

Syrian backing in the 1970s gave as-Sa'iqa a military weight far greater than its political influence, which has always been small. During the Lebanese Civil War, it was often the second largest Palestinian faction in fighting strength, after Yassir Arafat's Fatah movement.

Under the name Eagles of the Palestinian Revolution - possibly the name of the armed wing of as-Sa'iqa - the organization committed a number of international terrorist attacks. Among these was the 1979 takeover of the Egyptian embassy in Ankara, Turkey (although attributed to Fatah) and a kidnapping of Jews emigrating by train through Austria from the Soviet Union to Israel. Since the early 1990s, the organization has not committed any known attacks, and it is not listed on the U.S. State Department list of Foreign Terrorist Organizations.

== Ideological profile ==
As-Sa'iqa's political agenda is identical to that of Ba'athist Syria, i.e., Arab socialist, nationalist and strongly committed to Pan-Arab doctrine. While this reflects its Ba'thist programme, it has also used Pan-Arabism as a means of supporting the primacy of its sponsor, Syria, over the Arafat-led PLO's claim to exclusive representation of the Palestinian people. Thus, it rejected "Palestinization" of the conflict with Israel, insisting on the necessary involvement of the greater Arab nation. This occasionally went to extremes, with as-Sa'iqa leaders denying the existence of a separate Palestinian people within the wider Arab nation.

The group has generally taken a hard line stance (reflecting that of Syria) on issues such as the recognition of Israel, the Oslo Accords, and other questions of Palestinian goals and political orientation. It was a member of the 1974 Rejectionist Front, despite supporting the Ten Point Programme that initially caused the PLO/Rejectionist Front split.

== See also ==
- Damour massacre
- Aishiyeh massacre
- Arab–Israeli conflict
- Arab Liberation Front
- Popular Front for the Liberation of Palestine – General Command
- Fatah al-Intifada
- Palestine Liberation Army
