= Palestinian Popular Struggle Front =

Palestinian Popular Struggle Front جبهة النضال الشعبي الفلسطيني
- Leader: Ahmed Majdalani
- Founded: 1967
- Ideology: Socialism; Left-wing nationalism Palestinian nationalism
- Political position: Left-wing
- National affiliation: Palestine Liberation Organization
- International affiliation: Progressive Alliance; Socialist International (Consultative)

Website
- www.nedalshabi.ps

The Palestinian Popular Struggle Front (PPSF, occasionally abbr. PSF) (Arabic: جبهة النضال الشعبي الفلسطيني, Jabhet Al-Nedal Al-Sha'abi Al-Falestini) is a Palestinian political party. Samir Ghawshah was elected secretary-general of PPSF in 1971 and led it until his death in 2009. He was succeeded by Ahmed Majdalani on 8 August 2009.

PPSF holds a seat on the Palestine Liberation Organization (PLO) executive council, though it is generally considered to have a limited influence over Palestinian politics.

== Early history ==
The PPSF was founded as the Palestinian Popular Struggle Organization (PPSO) in the West Bank in 1967 by Bahjat Abu Gharbieh, a former Ba'athist, following a split from the Popular Front for the Liberation of Palestine (PFLP). It had close ties to Fatah, and in 1971 it officially became a Fatah-affiliated organization. It fell out with Yasir Arafat in 1973, and left Fatah to act independently. In 1974 PPSF left the PLO to become a founding member of the Rejectionist Front with other radical Palestinian factions who rejected the Ten Point Program adopted by the Palestine Liberation Organization (PLO).

In 1969, the organization attacked civilian Israeli and Greek passengers in Athens Airport in 1969 which resulted in 14 injures and one dead child. A year later, the organization also hijacked Olympic Airways Flight 255 from Beirut, Lebanon en route to Athens. The hijackers ordered the flight flown to Cairo, Egypt with five crew members.

Initially close to Egypt after its break with Fatah, it eventually slipped into decline. In 1982 it was revived jointly by Syria and Libya, in an attempt to bolster hardliner and anti-Arafat forces in the PLO (Syria was simultaneously fighting the PLO in Lebanon).

Members of the PPSF were mentioned as possible suspects in the 1988 Lockerbie Bombing, believed to have been orchestrated by the Libyan regime, but Samir Ghawshah denied the charges.

== Reconciliation with PLO and PNA politics ==
In 1991, PPSF was allowed to rejoin the PLO after accepting United Nations Security Council Resolution 242 and the concept of negotiations with Israel. Ghawshah gained a seat on the PLO Executive Committee. The PPSF split into two, the main group, the Samir Ghawsha faction, accepted the Palestinian National Authority (PNA), while Khalid ‘Abd al-Majid's parallel PPSF opposed it from exile in Damascus, Syria.

The Samir Ghawsha faction of PPSF took part in the 1996 Palestinian legislative elections with 12 candidates. Together they got 0.76% of the national vote. The faction also took part in the 2006 Palestinian legislative election as part of the "Freedom and Social Justice" list, which got 7,127 votes (0.72%) and failed to win a seat.

In June 2018 the party was admitted to the Socialist International as consultative member.

== Front organizations ==
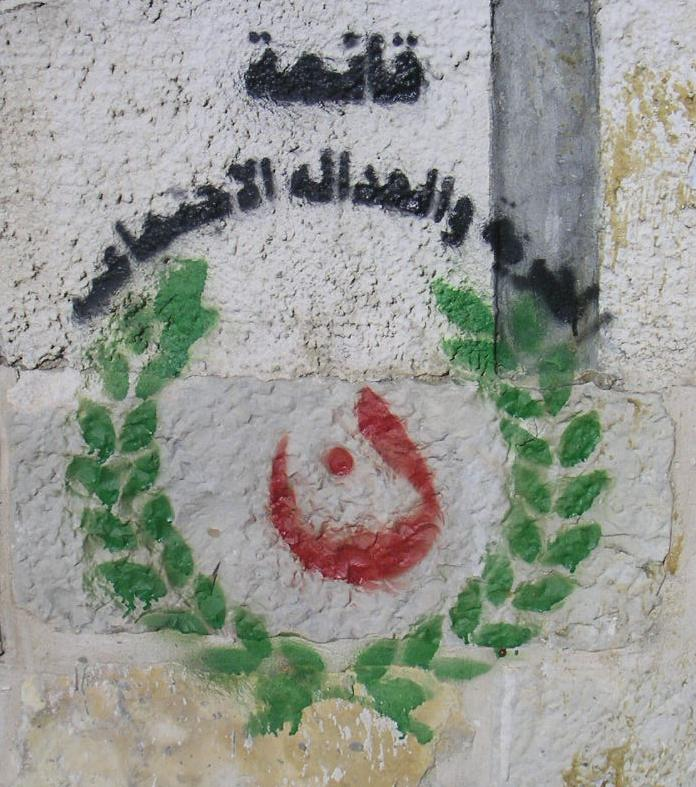
'Freedom and Social Justice' electoral stencil in Ramallah

The PPSF maintains five front organizations; the Workers Struggle Bloc, Palestinian Struggle Youth Union, Students Struggle Bloc, Women's Struggle Bloc and Teachers Struggle Bloc.

PPSF publishes Sawt an-Nidhal (Voice of the Struggle).

== See also ==
- List of political parties in the Palestinian National Authority
- Palestinian Popular Struggle Front (1991)
