= Palestine Liberation Organization =

Official representative of Palestinians

Palestine Liberation Organization منظمة التحرير الفلسطينية Munaẓẓamat at-Taḥrīr al-Filasṭīniyyah
- Abbreviation: PLO
- Chairman: Mahmoud Abbas
- Founder: Ahmad Shukeiri
- Founded: 28 May 1964 (62 years, 156 days)
- Headquarters: Al-Bireh, West Bank
- Ideology: Palestinian nationalism; Arab nationalism; Pan-Arabism; Arab socialism; Secularism; Anti-imperialism; Factions: One-state solution; Two-state solution; Conservatism; Anti-Zionism; Ba'athism; Marxism
- International affiliation: United Nations non-member observer
- Members: Palestinian National Liberation Movement (Fatah); Popular Front for the Liberation of Palestine (PFLP); Democratic Front for the Liberation of Palestine (DFLP); Popular Front for the Liberation of Palestine – General Command (PFLP-GC); Palestinian People's Party (PPP); Arab Liberation Front (ALF); Vanguard for the Popular Liberation War – Lightning Forces (As-Sa'iqa); Palestinian Liberation Front (PLF); Palestinian Arab Front (PAF); Palestinian Democratic Union (FIDA); Palestinian Popular Struggle Front (PPSF)
- Anthem: Fidāʾiyy
- Palestinian Legislative Council: 50 / 132 (38%)

Party flag

Website
- plo.ps

The Palestine Liberation Organization (PLO; Arabic: منظمة التحرير الفلسطينية, romanized: Munaẓẓamat at-Taḥrīr al-Filasṭīniyyah) is a Palestinian nationalist coalition that is internationally recognized as the official representative of the Palestinian people in the occupied Palestinian territories. It is currently represented by the Palestinian Authority based in the West Bank city of Al-Bireh.

Founded in 1964, it initially sought to establish an Arab state over the entire territory of the former Mandatory Palestine, advocating the elimination of Israel. Mediated talks between the Israeli government and the PLO in 1993 (the Oslo I Accord) resulted in the PLO recognizing Israel's legitimacy and accepting United Nations Security Council Resolution 242, which mandated Israel's withdrawal from occupied territories, while Israel recognized the PLO as a legitimate authority representing the Palestinian people. Despite the Israel–PLO Letters of Mutual Recognition (1993), in which PLO leader Yasser Arafat renounced violence against Israel, the PLO engaged in militant activities during the Second Intifada (2000–2005). On 29 October 2018, the PLO Central Council suspended the Palestinian recognition of Israel.

As the officially recognized government of the State of Palestine, it has enjoyed United Nations observer status since 1974. Prior to the Oslo Accords, the PLO's militant wings engaged in acts of violence against both the Israeli military and civilians, within Israel and abroad. The United States designated it as a terrorist group in 1987, though a presidential waiver has permitted American–PLO contact since 1988.

== History and armed actions ==
=== Early actions ===
At its first summit meeting in Cairo in 1964, the Arab League initiated the creation of an organization representing the Palestinian people. The Palestinian National Council convened in Jerusalem on 28 May 1964. After concluding the meeting, the PLO was founded on 2 June 1964. Its stated "complementary goals" were Arab unity and the liberation of Palestine.

The group used guerrilla tactics to attack Israel from their bases in Jordan (which then included the West Bank), Lebanon, Egypt (Gaza Strip), and Syria.

The most notable of what were considered terrorist acts committed by member organizations of the PLO were in the 1970s. The 1970 Avivim school bus massacre by the Democratic Front for the Liberation of Palestine (DFLP), killed nine children, three adults and crippled 19. In the late 1960s and early 1970s, the Popular Front for the Liberation of Palestine, the second-largest PLO faction after al-Fatah, carried out a number of attacks and plane hijackings mostly directed at Israel, most infamously the Dawson's Field hijackings, which precipitated the Black September crisis.

In 1972, the Black September Organization, whose relationship to the PLO is disputed, carried out the Munich massacre of Israeli Olympic athletes. In 1974, members of the DFLP seized a school in Israel and killed a total of 26 students and adults and wounded over 70 in the Ma'alot massacre. The 1975 Savoy Hotel hostage situation, killing 8 hostages and 3 soldiers, was carried out by Fatah. The 1978 Coastal road massacre, killing 37 Israelis and wounding 76, was also carried out by Fatah.

=== PLO operations in Jordan: 1967–1971 ===
From 1967 to September 1970 the PLO, with passive support from Jordan, fought a war of attrition with Israel. During this time, the PLO launched artillery attacks on the moshavim and kibbutzim of Bet Shean Valley Regional Council, while fedayeen launched numerous attacks on Israeli forces. Israel raided the PLO camps in Jordan, including Karameh, withdrawing only under Jordanian military pressure.

This conflict culminated in Jordan's expulsion of the PLO to Lebanon in July 1971.

The PLO suffered a major reversal with the Jordanian assault on its armed groups, in the events known as Black September in 1970. The Palestinian groups were expelled from Jordan, and during the 1970s, the PLO was effectively an umbrella group of eight organizations headquartered in Damascus and Beirut, all devoted to armed struggle against Zionism or Israeli occupation, using methods which included direct clashing and guerrilla warfare against Israel.

=== Lebanese Civil War: 1971–1982 ===
The PLO had begun establishing bases in Lebanon as early as the 1960's, with Egypt notably pressuring Lebanon into signing the Cairo Agreement (1969). But after the PLO's expulsion from Jordan, the PLO relocated its headquarters to South Lebanon. The PLO allied with local leftist groups and destabilized the delicate sectarian balance of power in Lebanon. The PLO and other Palestinian militants waged a campaign of attacks on the Galilee and on Israeli and Jewish targets worldwide. Increasing penetration of Palestinians into Lebanese politics and Israeli retaliations gradually deteriorated the situation.

By the mid-1970s, Arafat and his Fatah movement found themselves in a tenuous position. Arafat increasingly called for diplomacy, perhaps best symbolized by his Ten Point Program and his support for a UN Security Council resolution proposed in 1976 calling for a two-state settlement on the pre-1967 borders. But the Rejectionist Front denounced the calls for diplomacy, and a diplomatic solution was vetoed by the United States.

In 1975, the increasing tensions between Palestinian militants and Christian militias escalated into the Lebanese Civil War, involving all factions. On 20 January 1976, the PLO took part in the Damour massacre in retaliation to the Karantina massacre. The PLO and Lebanese National Movement attacked the Christian town of Damour, killing 684 civilians and forcing the remainder of the town's population to flee.

The population in the West Bank and Gaza Strip saw Arafat as their best hope for a resolution to the conflict. This was especially so in the aftermath of the Camp David Accords of 1978 between Israel and Egypt, which the Palestinians saw as a blow to their aspirations to self-determination. Abu Nidal, a sworn enemy of the PLO since 1974, assassinated the PLO's diplomatic envoy to the European Economic Community, which in the Venice Declaration of 1980 had called for the Palestinian right of self-determination to be recognized by Israel.

Opposition to Arafat was fierce not only among radical Arab groups, but also among many on the Israeli right. This included Menachem Begin, who had stated on more than one occasion that even if the PLO accepted UN Security Council Resolution 242 and recognized Israel's right to exist, he would never negotiate with the organization. This contradicted the official United States position that it would negotiate with the PLO if the PLO accepted Resolution 242 and recognized Israel, which the PLO had thus far been unwilling to do. Other Arab voices had recently called for a diplomatic resolution to the hostilities in accord with the international consensus, including Egyptian leader Anwar Sadat on his visit to Washington, DC in August 1981, and Crown Prince Fahd of Saudi Arabia in his 7 August peace proposal; together with Arafat's diplomatic maneuver, these developments made Israel's argument that it had "no partner for peace" seem increasingly problematic. Thus, in the eyes of Israeli hard-liners, "the Palestinians posed a greater challenge to Israel as a peacemaking organization than as a military one".

After the appointment of Ariel Sharon to the post of Minister of Defense in 1981, the Israeli government policy of allowing political growth to occur in the occupied West Bank and Gaza strip changed. The Israeli government tried, unsuccessfully, to dictate terms of political growth by replacing local pro-PLO leaders with an Israeli civil administration.

The PLO established a proto-state in South and Central Lebanon known as Fatahland, but the PLO-leftist alliance oppressed the local population, eventually turning Sunni's, Shia's, and Christians against them. This led to armed conflicts between these groups and the PLO leftist alliance. In 1978 Israel alongside the SLA (a mostly Christian Lebanese group) launched an invasion of South Lebanon which succeeded in driving the PLO from South Lebanon.

In 1982, after an attack on a senior Israeli diplomat by Lebanon-based Palestinian militants in Lebanon, Israel invaded Lebanon in a much larger scale in coordination with the Lebanese Christian militias, reaching Beirut and eventually resulting in ousting of the PLO headquarters in June that year. Low-level Palestinian insurgency in Lebanon continued in parallel with the consolidation of Shia militant organizations, but became a secondary concern to Israeli military and other Lebanese factions. With ousting of the PLO, the Lebanese Civil War gradually turned into a prolonged conflict, shifting from mainly PLO-Christian conflict into involvement of all Lebanese factions – whether Sunni, Shia, Druze, and Christians.

=== Headquarters in Tunis: 1982–1991 ===
In 1982, the PLO relocated to Tunis, Tunisia after it was driven out of Lebanon by Israel during the 1982 Lebanon War. Following massive raids by Israeli forces in Beirut, it is estimated that 8,000 PLO fighters evacuated the city and dispersed.

On 1 October 1985, in Operation Wooden Leg, Israeli Air Force F-15s bombed the PLO's Tunis headquarters, killing more than 60 people.

It is suggested that the Tunis period (1982–1991) was a negative point in the PLO's history, leading up to the Oslo negotiations and formation of the Palestinian Authority (PA). The PLO in exile was distant from a concentrated number of Palestinians and became far less effective. There was a significant reduction in centers of research, political debates or journalistic endeavors that had encouraged an energized public presence of the PLO in Beirut. More and more Palestinians were abandoned, and many felt that this was the beginning of the end.

=== Oslo I Accord (1993) ===
Mediated talks between the Israeli government and the PLO in 1993 (the Oslo I Accord) resulted in the PLO recognizing Israel's right to exist in peace and accepting United Nations Security Council Resolution 242 ("inadmissibility of the acquisition of territory by war and the need to work for a just and lasting peace in the Middle East in which every State in the area can live in security"), while Israel recognized the PLO as a legitimate authority representing the Palestinian people. Despite the Israel–PLO Letters of Mutual Recognition (1993), in which PLO leader Yasser Arafat renounced "terrorism and other acts of violence" against Israel, the PLO continued to engage in militant activities, particularly during the Second Intifada (see next subsection).

=== Second Intifada: 2000–2004 ===
The Second or Al-Aqsa Intifada started concurrently with the breakdown of July 2000 Camp David talks between Palestinian Authority Chairman Yasser Arafat and Israeli Prime Minister Ehud Barak. The Intifada never ended officially, but violence hit relatively low levels during 2005. The death toll, including both military personnel and civilians, of the entire conflict in 2000–2004 is estimated to be 3,223 Palestinians and 950 Israelis, although this number is criticized for not differentiating between combatants and civilians. Members of the PLO have claimed responsibility for a number of attacks against Israelis during the Second Intifada. The PLO has been sued in the United States by families of those killed or injured in attacks by Palestinians. One lawsuit was settled prior to going to trial. The other went to trial. The PLO was found liable for the death and injuries of US citizens in a number of terrorist attacks in Israel from 2001 to 2004 and ordered to pay a judgment of $655.5 million. The verdict was overturned on appeal for a lack of US federal jurisdiction over actions committed overseas.

== Ideology ==
The ideology of the PLO was formulated in the founding year, 1964, in the Palestinian National Covenant.

After the 1967 war, the ideology of the PLO changed significantly. In 1968, the Charter was replaced by a comprehensively revised version. For the first time, the PLO called for the establishment of a Palestinian state (to replace Israel) in which Christians, Muslims and Jews would have equal rights, thereby tacitly accepting Jewish presence in Palestine. The goal was akin to forcing regime change in Israel, as opposed to a drastic redrawing of borders. The Palestinian National Council also insisted upon greater independence from Arab governments.

In 1974, PLO accepted the creation of a "national authority" in the West Bank and Gaza as a first step towards liberating Palestine. This tacit recognition of Israel caused the Rejectionist Front to break away. In 1976, the PLO accepted an "independent state" in the West Bank and Gaza, which was widely interpreted as accepting Israel's permanent existence. Shortly after that, the PLO established contacts with the Israeli left. The PLO's proposal was similar to the one given by Egyptian Prime Minister Ismail Fahmi, in 1976, where he promised Israel peace on the basis of withdrawing to the 1967 borders, creation of the State of Palestine in the West Bank and Gaza, and a nuclear weapons free Middle East. The PNC also authorized Palestinian representatives to meet Israeli officials at an Arab-Israeli peace conference. In response, Israeli Prime Minister Rabin responded, "the only place the Israelis could meet the Palestinian guerrillas was on the field of battle."

Until 1993, the only promoted option was armed struggle. From the signing of the Oslo Accords, negotiation and diplomacy became the only official policy.

In April 1996, a large number of articles, which were inconsistent with the Oslo Accords, were wholly or partially nullified.

At the core of the PLO's ideology is the belief that Zionists had unjustly expelled the Palestinians from Palestine and established a Jewish state in place under the pretext of having historic and Jewish ties with Palestine. The PLO demanded that Palestinian refugees be allowed to return to their homes. This is expressed in the National Covenant:

Article 2 of the Charter states that "Palestine, with the boundaries it had during the British mandate, is an indivisible territorial unit", meaning that there is no place for a Jewish state. This article was adapted in 1996 to meet the Oslo Accords.

Article 20 states: "The Balfour Declaration, the Mandate for Palestine, and everything that has been based upon them, are deemed null and void. Claims of historical or religious ties of Jews with Palestine are incompatible with the facts of history and the true conception of what constitutes statehood. Judaism, being a religion, is not an independent nationality. Nor do Jews constitute a single nation with an identity of its own; they are citizens of the states to which they belong". This article was nullified in 1996.

Article 3 reads: "The Palestinian Arab people possess the legal right to their homeland and have the right to determine their destiny after achieving the liberation of their country in accordance with their wishes and entirely of their own accord and will".

=== Secularism versus adherence to Islam ===
The PLO and its dominating faction, Fatah, are often contrasted with more religious-orientated factions like Hamas and the Palestinian Islamic Jihad (PIJ). All, however, represent a predominantly Muslim population. Practically the whole population of the Territories is Muslim, mostly Sunni. Around 50,000 (c. 1%) of the 4.6 million Palestinians in the occupied Palestinian territories (OPT) are Palestinian Christian.

Under President Arafat, the Fatah-dominated Palestinian Authority adopted the 2003 Amended Basic Law, which stipulates Islam as the sole official religion in Palestine and the principles of Islamic sharia as a principal source of legislation. The draft Constitution contains the same provisions. The draft Constitution was formulated by a Constitutional Committee, established by Arafat in 1999 and endorsed by the PLO.

== Organization ==
=== Structure ===
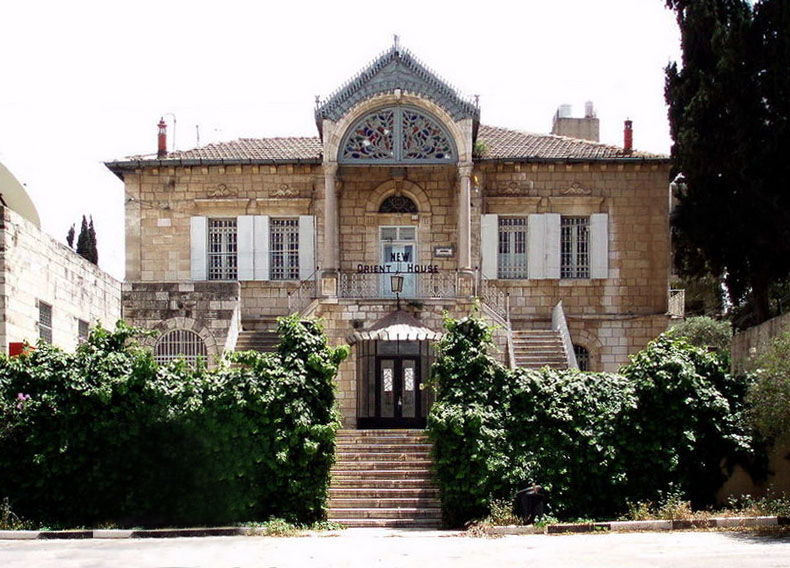
Orient House, the former PLO headquarters in Jerusalem

The PLO incorporates a range of generally secular ideologies of different Palestinian movements "committed to the struggle for Palestinian independence and liberation," hence the name of the organization. It's formally an umbrella organization that includes "numerous organizations of the resistance movement, political parties, and popular organizations." From the beginning, the PLO was designed as a government in exile, with a parliament, the Palestine National Council (PNC), chosen by the Palestinian people, as the highest authority in the PLO, and an executive government (EC), elected by the PNC. In practice, however, the organization was rather a hierarchic one with a military-like character, needed for its function as a liberation organization, the "liberation of Palestine".

The Palestinian National Charter describes the ideology of the PLO. A constitution, named "Fundamental Law", was adopted, which dictates the inner structure of the organization and the representation of the Palestinian people. A draft Constitution was written in 1963, to rule the PLO until free general elections among all the Palestinians in all the countries in which they resided could be held. The Constitution was revised in 1968.

=== Institutions ===
The Palestinian National Council has 740 members and the Executive Committee or ExCo has 18 members. The Palestinian Central Council or CC or PCC, established by the PNC in 1973, is the second leading body of the PLO. The CC consists of 124 members from the PLO Executive Committee, PNC, PLC and other Palestinian organizations. The EC includes 15 representatives of the PLC. The CC functions as an intermediary body between the PNC and the EC. The CC makes policy decisions when PNC is not in session, acting as a link between the PNC and the PLO-EC. The CC is elected by the PNC and chaired by the PNC speaker.

The PNC serves as the parliament for all Palestinians inside and outside of the Occupied Palestinian Territory, including Jerusalem. The PLO is governed internally by its "Fundamental Law", which describes the powers and the relations between the organs of the PLO.

Ahmad Shukeiri was the first Chairman of the PLO Executive Committee from 1964 to 1967. In 1967, he was replaced by Yahia Hammuda. Yasser Arafat occupied the position from 1969 until his death in 2004. He was succeeded by Mahmoud Abbas (also known as Abu Mazen).

According to an internal PLO document, the PNC continues to act if elections are not possible. In absence of elections, most of the members of the PNC are appointed by the executive committee. The document further states that "the PNC represents all sectors of the Palestinian community worldwide, including numerous organizations of the resistance movement, political parties, popular organizations and independent personalities and figures from all sectors of life, including intellectuals, religious leaders and businessmen".

=== Publications ===
The PLO has published various newspapers and magazines first of which was Falastinuna and pamphlets. During the late 1970s its publications increased consisting of twenty-nine dailies, eighteen weeklies, thirteen biweeklies, sixty-two monthlies, sixteen quarterlies, and twenty-one annuals. Some of them are Falastin Al Thawra and Shu'un Filastiniyya. Its official news agency is Wafa.

=== Challenged representation ===
As of 2015, there have not been elections for many years, neither for the PNC, nor for the EC, the PCC or the President of the State of Palestine. The executive committee has formally 18 members, including its chairman, but in past years many vacant seats in the Executive remained empty. Moreover, Hamas, the largest representative of the inhabitants of the Palestinian Territories alongside Fatah, is not represented in the PLO at all. The results of the last parliamentary elections for the PLC, held in the Territories in 2006, with Hamas as the big winner while not even a member of the PLO, "underlined the clear lack of a popular mandate by the PLO leadership", according to PASSIA. Individual elected members of the PLC representing Hamas, however, are automatically members of the PNC.

The representative status of the PLO has often been challenged in the past. It was for example doubted in 2011 by a group of Palestinian lawyers, jurists and legal scholars, due to lack of elections. They questioned the PLO's legitimacy to alter the status and role of the Organization in respect of their status within the UN. They demanded immediate and direct elections to the Palestine National Council to ″activate representative PLO institutions in order to preserve, consolidate, and strengthen the effective legal representation of the Palestinian people as a whole″, before changing the status within the UN.

=== PLO versus PA ===
The 1993–1995 Oslo Accords deliberately detached the Palestinian population in the Occupied Palestinian Territories from the PLO and the Palestinians in exile by creating a Palestinian Authority (PA) for the Territories. A separate parliament and government were established. Mahmoud Abbas was one of the architects of the Oslo Accords.

Although many in the PLO opposed the Oslo Agreements, the executive committee and the Central Council approved the Accords. It marked the beginning of the PLO's decline, as the PA came to replace the PLO as the prime Palestinian political institution. Political factions within the PLO that had opposed the Oslo process were marginalized.

The PLO managed to overcome the separation by uniting the power in PLO and PA in one individual, Yasser Arafat. In 2002, Arafat held the functions of Chairman of the PLO/Executive Committee; Chairman of Fatah, the dominating faction within the PLO; as well as President of the Palestinian National Authority. He also controlled the Palestinian National Security Forces.

Only during the Hamas-led PA Government in 2006–2007 did the PLO resurface. After Hamas took over Gaza in 2007, Abbas issued a decree suspending the PLC and some sections of the Palestinian Basic Law, and appointed Salam Fayyad as prime minister.

The PLO remains the official representative of Palestine at the UN.

=== Internal politics ===
On 4 February 1969, Fatah founder, Arafat, was elected Chairman of the PLO in Cairo. Since, Fatah has been the dominant factor within the PLO, which still continues in 2015.

Under pressure from the international community led by Israel and US, and from inside his own party Fatah, Arafat partially transferred some of his strongly centralized power in 2003, causing strong tensions within the Palestinian leadership. Arafat appointed Mahmoud Abbas as prime minister, but this resulted in disputes about the transfer of tasks and responsibilities. Abbas was strongly supported by the US and the international community, because he was supposed to be more willing to give far-reaching concessions to Israel. While Arafat had retained most of his power and a power struggle within Fatah continued, the leadership was criticized for corruption and nepotism.

After Arafat's death, Abbas increasingly gained exclusive powers within both PLO and PA as well as in Fatah, until he had acquired the same power as was previously held by Arafat. Abbas is criticized for his autocratic rule and refusal to share powers and plans with other Palestinians. In the absence of a functioning parliament and Executive, he even began to issue his own laws. Senior representative of Abbas' Fatah faction and former Fatah minister of prisoner affairs, Sufian Abu Zaida, complained that Abbas appointed himself as the chief judge and prosecutor, making a mockery of the Palestinian judicial system. There appeared reports of widespread corruption and nepotism within the Palestinian Authority. Only Hamas-ruled Gaza has a more or less functioning parliament.

==== 2015 struggle for power ====
With a de facto defunct parliament and Executive, Mahmoud Abbas increasingly gained exclusive powers within both PLO and PA, as well as in Fatah. After the announcement in August 2015 of Abbas' resignation as Chairman of the Executive Committee and of nine other members as well, many Palestinians saw the move as just an attempt to replace some members in the executive committee, or to force a meeting of the PNC and remain in their jobs until the PNC decides whether to accept or to reject their resignations. Met with fierce criticism by many Palestinian factions, a session of the PNC, who had to approve the resignations, was postponed indefinitely.

== Political status ==
The Palestine Liberation Organization is recognized by the Arab League as "the sole and legitimate representative of the Palestinian people", and by the United Nations as "the representative of the Palestinian people".

The PLO was designated a terrorist organization by the United States in 1987, but in 1988, a presidential waiver was issued, which permitted contact with the organization. Most of the rest of the world recognized the PLO as the legitimate representatives of the Palestinian people from the mid-1970s onwards (after the PLO's admission to the UN as an observer.)

In 1993, PLO chairman Yasser Arafat recognized the State of Israel in an official letter to its prime minister, Yitzhak Rabin. In response to Arafat's letter, Israel decided to revise its stance toward the PLO and to recognize the organization as the representative of the Palestinian people. This led to the signing of the Oslo Accords in 1993.

=== Status at the United Nations ===
==== Observer status ====
The United Nations General Assembly recognized the PLO as the "representative of the Palestinian people" in Resolution 3210 and Resolution 3236, and granted the PLO observer status on 22 November 1974 in Resolution 3237. On 12 January 1976, the UN Security Council voted 11–1 with 3 abstentions to allow the Palestine Liberation Organization to participate in a Security Council debate without voting rights, a privilege usually restricted to UN member states. It was admitted as a full member of the Asia group on 2 April 1986.

After the Palestinian Declaration of Independence the PLO's representation was renamed Palestine. On 7 July 1998, this status was extended to allow participation in General Assembly debates, though not in voting.

==== 2011 application for UN state membership ====
When President Mahmoud Abbas submitted an application for UN state membership, in September 2011, Palestinian lawyers, jurists and legal scholars expressed their concern that the change of Palestine's status in the UN (since 1988 designated as "Palestine" in place of "Palestine Liberation Organization") could have negative implications on the legal position of the Palestinian people. They warned for the risk of fragmentation, where the State of Palestine would represent the people within the UN and the PLO represent the people outside the UN, the latter including the Palestinians in exile, where refugees constitute more than half of the Palestinian people. They were also afraid of the loss of representation of the refugees in the UN. In Resolution 67/19 November 2012, Palestine was at last awarded non-member observer State status, but the General Assembly maintained the status of the PLO.

==== "Non-member observer state" status ====
By September 2012, with their application for full membership stalled due to the inability of Security Council members to '"make a unanimous recommendation", the PLO had decided to pursue an upgrade in status from observer entity to non-member observer state. On 29 November 2012, Resolution 67/19 passed, upgrading Palestine to non-member observer state status in the United Nations.

=== Diplomatic representation ===
The Palestine Information Office was registered with the Justice Department of the United States as a foreign agent until 1968, when it was closed. It was reopened in 1989 as the Palestine Affairs Center. The PLO Mission office in Washington, DC was opened in 1994 and represented the PLO in the United States. On 20 July 2010, the United States Department of State agreed to upgrade the status of the PLO Mission in the United States to "General Delegation of the PLO". Secretary of State Rex Tillerson in 2017 determined that the PLO Mission broke a US law prohibiting the PLO Mission from attempting to get the International Criminal Court to prosecute Israelis for offences against Palestinians, under penalty of closure. On 10 September 2018, National Security Advisor John Bolton announced the closure of the PLO Mission; Nauert, a U.S. Department of State spokeswoman, cited as the reason Palestine's "push to have the International Criminal Court investigate Israel for possible war crimes."

== Peace process ==
Initially, as a guerrilla organization, the PLO performed actions against Israel in the 1970s and early 1980s, regarded as terroristic activities by Israel and regarded as a war of liberation by the PLO. In 1988, however, the PLO officially endorsed a two-state solution, contingent on terms such as making East Jerusalem the capital of the Palestinian state and giving Palestinians the right of return to land occupied by Palestinians prior to 1948, as well as the right to continue armed struggle until the end of "The Zionist Entity." In 1996, the PLO nullified the articles of the PLO's Charter, or parts of it, which called for the destruction of Israel and for armed resistance. In Yasser Arafat's 9 September 1993 letter to Israeli Prime Minister Yitzhak Rabin, as part of the first Oslo Accord, Arafat stated that "The PLO recognizes the right of the State of Israel to exist in peace and security." These remarks from Arafat were seen as a shift from one of the PLO's previous primary aims—the destruction of Israel.

=== Ten Point Program ===
Following the failure of the armies of Egypt and Syria to defeat Israel in October 1973 Yom Kippur War, which broke the status quo existing since June 1967 Six-Day War, the PLO began formulating a strategic alternative. Now, they intended to establish a "national authority" over every territory they would be able to reconquer. From 1 to 9 June 1974, the Palestine National Council held its 12th meeting in Cairo. On 8 June, the Ten Point Program was adopted. The Program stated:

The Liberation Organization will employ all means, and first and foremost armed struggle, to liberate Palestinian territory and to establish the independent combatant national authority for the people over every part of Palestinian territory that is liberated. This will require further changes being effected in the balance of power in favour of our people and their struggle.

By "every part of Palestinian territory that is liberated" was implicitly meant the West Bank and Gaza Strip, albeit presented as an interim goal. The final goal remained "completing the liberation of all Palestinian territory" and "recover all their national rights and, first and foremost, their rights to return and to self-determination on the whole of the soil of their homeland". In addition, UN Resolution 242 was still rejected.

While clinging to armed struggle as the prime means, the PLO no longer excluded peaceful means. Therefore, the Ten Point Program was considered the first attempt by the PLO at peaceful resolution. In October 1974, the Arab League proclaimed the PLO "the sole legitimate representative of the Palestinian people in any Palestinian territory that is liberated", and also the UN recognized the PLO. From then, the diplomatic road was prepared. On the other hand, the Program was rejected by more radical factions and eventually caused a split in the movement.

=== First Intifada ===
In 1987, the First Intifada broke out in the West Bank and Gaza Strip. The Intifada caught the PLO by surprise, and the leadership abroad could only indirectly influence the events. A new local leadership emerged, the Unified National Leadership of the Uprising (UNLU), comprising many leading Palestinian factions. After King Hussein of Jordan proclaimed the administrative and legal separation of the West Bank from Jordan in 1988, the Palestine National Council adopted the Palestinian Declaration of Independence in Algiers, proclaiming an independent Palestine. The declaration made reference to UN resolutions without explicitly mentioning Security Council Resolutions 242 and 338.

A month later, Arafat declared in Geneva that the PLO would support a solution to the conflict based on these Resolutions. Effectively, the PLO recognized Israel's right to exist within pre-1967 borders, with the understanding that the Palestinians would be allowed to set up their own state in the West Bank and Gaza. The United States accepted this clarification by Arafat and began to allow diplomatic contacts with PLO officials. The Proclamation of Independence did not lead to statehood, although over 100 states recognized the State of Palestine.

=== Oslo Accords ===
In 1993, the PLO secretly negotiated the Oslo Accords with Israel. The accords were signed on 20 August 1993, with a subsequent public ceremony in Washington, D.C., on 13 September 1993 with Yasser Arafat and Yitzhak Rabin. The Accords granted Palestinians the right to self-government in the Gaza Strip and the city of Jericho in the West Bank through the creation of the Palestinian Authority. Yasser Arafat was appointed head of the Palestinian Authority and a timetable for elections was laid out. The headquarters of the PLO were moved to Ramallah on the West Bank.

== Wealth controversy ==
According to a 1993 report by the British National Criminal Intelligence Service, the PLO was "the richest of all terrorist organizations", with $8–$10 billion in assets and an annual income of $1.5–$2 billion from "donations, extortion, payoffs, illegal arms dealing, drug trafficking, money laundering, fraud, etc." Estimates of the Palestine Liberation Organization's alleged hidden assets vary wildly and only Arafat had the whole picture. A former PLO finance minister said it was $3 billion to $5 billion.

== Membership ==
=== Present members include ===
Party	Abbr.	Founded	Leader	Ideology	Position
Arab Liberation Front; Arabic: جبهة التحرير العربية	ALF	1969	Rakad Salem	Saddamism	Left-wing (Note: Due to its association with the Ba'ath Party (Iraqi-dominated faction))
Democratic Front for the Liberation of Palestine; Arabic: الجبهة الديموقراطية لتحرير فلسطين	DFLP	1968	Nayef Hawatmeh	Maoism	Far-left
Palestinian Arab Front; Arabic: الجبهة العربية الفلسطينية	PAF	1993	Jameel Shihadeh	Socialism	Left-wing
Palestinian Democratic Union; Arabic: الاتحاد الديمقراطي الفلسطيني	FIDA	1990	Saleh Ra'fat	Scientific socialism	Left-wing
Palestinian Liberation Front (Abu Abbas faction); Arabic: جبهة التحرير الفلسطينية	PLF	1961	Wasel Abu Yousef	Ba'athism	Left-wing
Palestinian National Liberation Movement; Arabic: حركة التحرير الوطني الفلسطيني	Fatah فتح	1965	Mahmoud Abbas	Arab socialism	Centre to centre-left
Palestinian People's Party; Arabic: حزب الشعب الفلسطيني	PPP	1982	Bassam as-Salhi	Marxism	Left-wing to far-left
Palestinian Popular Struggle Front (Samir Ghawsha faction); Arabic: جبهة النضال الشعبي الفلسطيني	PPSF	1967	Ahmed Majdalani	Socialism	Left-wing
Popular Front for the Liberation of Palestine; Arabic: الجبهة الشعبية لتحرير فلسطين	PFLP	1967	Ahmad Sa'adat	Marxism–Leninism	Far-left
Popular Front for the Liberation of Palestine – General Command; Arabic: الجبهة الشعبية لتحرير فلسطين – القيادة العامة	PFLP-GC	1968	Talal Naji	Arab nationalism	Left-wing
Vanguard for the Popular Liberation War – Lightning Forces; Arabic: طلائع حرب التحرير الشعبية – قوات الصاعقة	As-Sa'iqa الصاعقة	1966	Mohammed Qeis	Neo-Ba'athism	Far-left (Note: Due to its association with the Ba'ath Party (Syrian-dominated faction))

=== Former member groups of the PLO include ===
Party	Abbr.	Founded	Leader	Ideology	Position
Palestinian Liberation Front (Abu Nidal Ashqar faction); Arabic: جبهة التحرير الفلسطينية	PLF	1983	Abu Nidal Ashqar	Arab nationalism	Left-wing
Palestinian National Liberation Movement – "Fatah"; Arabic: "حركة التحرير الوطني الفلسطيني – "فتح	Fatah al-Intifada فتح الانتفاضة	1983	Disputed	Arab socialism	Left-wing
Palestinian Popular Struggle Front (Khalid ʽAbd al-Majid faction); Arabic: جبهة النضال الشعبي الفلسطيني	PPSF	1991	Khalid ʽAbd al-Majid	Socialism	Left-wing
Revolutionary Palestinian Communist Party; Arabic: الحزب الشيوعي الفلسطيني-الثوري	RPCP	1982		Communism	Far-left

=== Executive Committee chairmen ===
Name	Image	Term
Ahmad Shukeiri		2 June 1964 – 24 December 1967
Yahya Hammuda		24 December 1967 – 2 February 1969
Yasser Arafat		4 February 1969 – 11 November 2004
Mahmoud Abbas		(acting [for Arafat] until 11 November 2004) 29 October 2004 – present

== See also ==
- Alliance of Palestinian Forces
- Fatah–Hamas conflict
- History of the State of Palestine
- Human rights in Palestine
- Israeli–Palestinian conflict
- Occupied Palestinian territories
- Palestine Liberation Army
- Palestinian political violence
- PLO Negotiations Affairs Department
- Palestinian exodus from Kuwait (1990–91)
- Rejectionist Front
- Timeline of the Israeli–Palestinian conflict

== Bibliography ==
- Hajjar, Lisa (2005). Courting conflict: the Israeli military court system in the West Bank and Gaza (Illustrated ed.). University of California Press. ISBN 978-0-520-24194-7.
- Yezid Sayigh, "Struggle Within, Struggle Without: the Transformation of PLO politics since 1982", International Affairs vol. 65, no. 2 (spring 1989) pages 247–271.
