= Palestinian National Covenant =

Covenant or charter of the Palestine Liberation Organization (PLO)

The Palestinian National Covenant or Palestinian National Charter (Arabic: الميثاق الوطني الفلسطيني; transliterated: al-Mithaq al-Watani al-Filastini) is the covenant or charter of the Palestine Liberation Organization (PLO). The Covenant is an ideological paper, written in the early days of the PLO.

The first version was adopted on 28 May 1964. In 1968 it was replaced by a comprehensively revised version. In April 1996, many articles, which were inconsistent with the Oslo Accords, were wholly or partially nullified.

== History ==
Following a 1963 Draft Constitution the first version of the Charter was written by Ahmad Shukeiri, the first chairman of the PLO, using the slightly different name al-Mithaq al-Qawmi al-Filastini, meant to reflect its origins in Nasser's Pan-Arabism. The first official English translation rendered al-Mithaq as "covenant", while later versions have tended to use "charter". (The word al-Qawmi changed to al-Watani in 1968. Both are translated to "national" in English.)

The Palestinian National Charter was adopted on 28 May 1964, establishing the Palestine Liberation Organization, in (east) Jerusalem along with another document, variously known as the Basic Constitution, Basic Law or Fundamental Law of the PLO, based on an earlier Draft Constitution. The Charter is concerned mainly with the aims of the Palestine Liberation Organization, while the Fundamental Law is more concerned with the structure and procedures of the organization.

The Charter was extensively amended, with seven new articles, in 1968 in the wake of the Six-Day War and given its current name. Compared to its predecessor, it focused more on the independent national identity and vanguard role of the Palestinian people, led by the PLO, in their "liberation of their homeland" by armed struggle. Article 7 of the earlier document was changed from "Jews of Palestinian origin are considered Palestinians ..." to being restricted only to those "who had resided in Palestine until the beginning of the Zionist invasion." The final article providing that it can only be amended by a vote of a two-thirds majority of the Palestinian National Council (PNC) at a special session convened for that purpose was left unchanged.

The Fundamental Law was also amended, making it more democratic, electing the entire executive committee by the PNC, instead of just the chairman, separating the post of the speaker of the PNC from the chairman of the executive committee and affirmed the authority of the executive committee over the army. Later, (Hirst, 2003, p. 427) a promised charter amendment based on Fatah doctrine "that all Jews [without date restriction] ... were to be entitled to Palestinian citizenship" failed due to doctrinal quarrels over the meaning of the precise nature of the proposed Democratic State.

The 1968 Charter also removed the 1964 Clause 24 which began, "This Organization does not exercise any territorial sovereignty over the West Bank in the Hashemite Kingdom of Jordan, on the Gaza Strip or in the Himmah Area." That is to say, the Charter in its original 1964 form made no territorial claims over the West Bank or Gaza.

== Events before 1998 ==
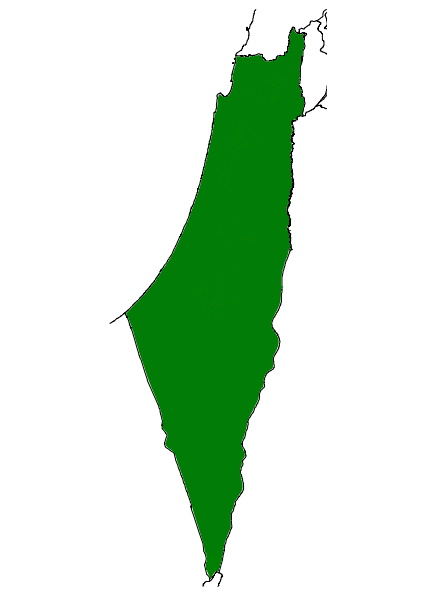
The boundaries of the British Mandate of Palestine

Israel has always strongly objected to the Charter, which describes the establishment of the state of Israel as "entirely illegal" (Art. 19), considers Palestine, with its original Mandate borders, as the indivisible homeland of the Arab Palestinian people (1–2), urges the elimination of Zionism in Palestine (Art. 15), and strongly urges the "liberation" of Palestine.

On 14 December 1988, following an outcry from his 13 December General Assembly speech, Yasser Arafat called a press conference in Geneva to clarify his earlier statement by specifically mentioning the right of all parties concerned in the Middle East conflict to exist in peace and security, including the State of Palestine, Israel, and their neighbours. He also renounced terrorism.

Israel dismissed these statements of moderation from Arafat and the PNC resolution in Algiers, 1988 (which had been sufficient to open a dialogue with the United States) as "deceptive propaganda exercises" because (among other objections), "the PLO Covenant has not changed." In May 1989, Arafat, in a statement later criticized by Edward Said as being beyond his authority, and properly a matter for the PNC, told a French TV interviewer "C'est caduc", meaning that it, the Charter, was obsolete. Roland Dumas, then French Minister of Foreign Affairs, stated in various interviews that he was the one who taught Arafat the meaning of the French word caduc in a meeting, so Arafat straight out of the meeting used it in his famous declaration on 2 May 1989, having been persuaded by Dumas's argument.

In August 1993, Israeli Prime Minister Yitzhak Rabin insisted on changes to the Charter as part of the Oslo Accords. Following Yasser Arafat's commitment to "submit to the Palestinian National Council for formal approval" the changes to the Charter confirming that "those articles of the Palestinian Covenant which deny Israel's right to exist, and the provisions of the Covenant which are inconsistent with the commitments of this letter are now inoperative and no longer valid" in the September 9, 1993 letters of mutual recognition, the PNC met in Gaza and voted on 24 April 1996. The decision was adopted by a vote of: 504 in favor, 54 against, and 14 abstentions. The official English translation used by Israel, the PLO and the United States reads:

A. The Palestinian National Charter is hereby amended by canceling the articles that are contrary to the letters exchanged between the P.L.O. and the Government of Israel 9–10 September 1993. B. Assigns its legal committee with the task of redrafting the Palestinian National Charter in order to present it to the first session of the Palestinian Central Council."

At one time the text of the Charter at the official website of the Palestinian National Authority appended these amendments to the text of the 1968 charter; the redrafting process referred to in the second amendment still remains uncompleted.

An earlier version of the above translation is still available on the website of Palestinian American Council. The relevant text reads:

The PNC held a special session on April 24, 1996 and listened to the report made by the legal committee, reviewed the current political conditions, which the Palestinian people and the Arab nations encounter, and so the PNC decided: "Depending on the Independence Declaration and the political statement adopted by the PNC in its 19th session in Gaza on November 11, 1988 which stressed resolving conflicts by peaceful means and adopting the principle of two states, the PNC decides to:

First: Amend the articles in the National charter that contradict with the letters exchanged between the PLO and the government of Israel on Sept. 9–10, 1993.

Second: The PNC authorizes the Legal Committee to draft a new charter to be presented at the first meeting to be held by the Central Council."

This earlier version had appeared on the Palestine Minister of Information's website. Many commentators noted that the text only indicated a decision to amend the charter, not an actual amendment. Official Palestinian websites have since replaced the vague translation with the concrete version quoted above.

Yitzhak Rabin said in a speech to the Knesset on 5 October 1995, at the time of the ratification of the Oslo II Interim Agreement: "The Palestinian Authority has not up until now honoured its commitment to change the Palestinian Covenant. ... I view these changes as a supreme test of the Palestinian Authority's willingness and ability, and the changes required will be an important and serious touchstone vis-à-vis the continued implementation of the agreement as a whole".

When this government was replaced by Benjamin Netanyahu's Likud government, the issue again became even more controversial, with Israel's demand for greater clarity and precision eventually expressed in the Wye River Memorandum. (See below, Events of 1998)

== Events of 1998 and after ==
=== Clauses regarding Israel ===
Yasser Arafat wrote letters to President Clinton and Prime Minister Blair in January 1998 explicitly listing the articles of the Charter referred to in the PNC's 1996 vote. While this was seen as progress in some quarters, other Palestinian officials contended that the Charter had not yet been amended, and there were also reportedly discrepancies between the two letters.

The operative language of Arafat's letter to Clinton reads:

The Palestine National Council's resolution, in accordance with Article 33 of the Covenant, is a comprehensive amendment of the Covenant. All of the provisions of the Covenant which are inconsistent with the P.L.O. commitment to recognize and live in peace side by side with Israel are no longer in effect. As a result, Articles 6–10, 15, 19–23, and 30 have been nullified, and the parts in Articles 1–5, 11–14, 16–18, 25–27 and 29 that are inconsistent with the above mentioned commitments have also been nullified.

The articles identified by Arafat as nullified call for Palestinian unity in armed struggle, deny the legitimacy of the establishment of Israel, deny the existence of a Jewish people with a historical or religious connection to Palestine, and label Zionism a racist, imperialist, fanatic, fascist, aggressive, colonialist political movement that must be eliminated from the Middle East for the sake of world peace.

Observers who had previously been skeptical of Palestinian claims that the Charter had been amended continued to voice doubts. In an attempt to end the confusion, the Wye River Memorandum included the following provision:

The Executive Committee of the Palestine Liberation Organization and the Palestinian Central Council will reaffirm the letter of 22 January 1998 from PLO Chairman Yasir Arafat to President Clinton concerning the nullification of the Palestinian National Charter provisions that are inconsistent with the letters exchanged between the PLO and the Government of Israel on 9–10 September 1993. PLO Chairman Arafat, the Speaker of the Palestine National Council, and the Speaker of the Palestinian Council will invite the members of the PNC, as well as the members of the Central Council, the Council, and the Palestinian Heads of Ministries to a meeting to be addressed by President Clinton to reaffirm their support for the peace process and the aforementioned decisions of the Executive Committee and the Central Council.

These commitments were kept, leading President Clinton to declare to the assembled Palestinian officials on 14 December 1998 at Gaza:

I thank you for your rejection—fully, finally and forever—of the passages in the Palestinian Charter calling for the destruction of Israel. For they were the ideological underpinnings of a struggle renounced at Oslo. By revoking them once and for all, you have sent, I say again, a powerful message not to the government, but to the people of Israel. You will touch people on the street there. You will reach their hearts there.

Like President Clinton, Israel and the Likud party now formally agreed that the objectionable clauses of the charter had been abrogated, in official statements and statements by Prime Minister Netanyahu, Foreign Minister Sharon, Defense Minister Mordechai and Trade and Industry Minister Sharansky. With official Israeli objections to the Charter disappearing henceforward from lists of Palestinian violations of agreements, the international legal controversy ended.

Despite President Clinton's optimism, the events of 1998 did not entirely resolve the controversy of the Charter. A June 1999 report by the Palestinian Authority's Ministry of Information on the status of the Charter made no mention of the 1998 events and leading Palestinians continue to state that the Charter has not yet been amended.

In 2001 the first draft of a constitution authorized by the PLO's Central Committee, calling for a respect for borders, human and civil rights as defined under international law appeared.

=== Regarding PLO reform ===
In March 2005 representatives of 13 Palestinian factions, including Fatah, Hamas, Islamic Jihad, PFLP and DFLP, adopted a 6 paragraph declaration known as the "Cairo Declaration". The declaration envisions a reform of the PLO to include all the Palestinian powers and factions.

In order to implement these reforms it was decided to form a committee made up of the PNC Chairman, the members of the Executive Committee, the secretaries general of all Palestinian factions and independent national personalities. The PLO-EC Chairman is tasked to convene this committee.

The agreement was reconfirmed several times in subsequent years but as of 2015 there had been no concrete steps toward implementation.

== Israeli views ==
Although the PNC met in Gaza on 24 April 1996, it did not revoke or change the covenant, but only issued a statement saying that it had become aged, and that an undefined part of it would be rewritten at an undetermined date in the future. While the English language press release stated that the PLO Covenant was "hereby amended", the Arabic version of Yassir Arafat's letter on this declaration stated:

It has been decided upon: 1. Changing the Palestine National Charter by canceling the articles that are contrary to the letters exchanged between the PLO and the Government of Israel, on 9 and 10 September 1993. 2. The PNC will appoint a legal committee with the task of redrafting the National Charter. The Charter will be presented to the first meeting of the Central Council.

The New York Times and others quoted similarly language (the ambiguous phrase decides to amend is quoted instead of hereby amended):

Formally, the resolution adopted by the council consisted of two simple clauses. The first declared that the council "decides to amend the Palestinian National Covenant by canceling clauses which contradict the letters exchanged between the P.L.O. and the Israeli Government." The second ordered a new charter to be drafted within six months.

"Peace Watch", an Israeli organization declaring itself to be "an apolitical, independent Israeli organization monitoring bilateral compliance with the Israel-PLO accords", issued the following statement:

The decision fails to meet the obligations laid out in the Oslo accords in two respects. First, the actual amendment of the Covenant has been left for a future date. As of now, the old Covenant, in its original form, remains the governing document of the PLO, and will continue in this status until the amendments are actually approved... There is a sharp difference between calling for something to change and actually implementing the changes. Second, the decision does not specify which clauses will be amended.

== Palestinian views ==
Reportedly, an internal PLO document from the Research and Thought Department of Fatah stated that changing the Covenant would have been "suicide for the PLO" and continued:

The text of the Palestinian National Covenant remains as it was and no changes whatsoever were made to it. This has caused it to be frozen, not annulled. The drafting of the new National Covenant will take into account the extent of Israeli fulfillment of its previous and coming obligations... evil and corrupt acts are expected from the Israeli side... The fact that the PNC did not hold a special session to make changes and amendments in the text of the National Covenant at this stage... was done to defend the new Covenant from being influenced by the current Israeli dictatorship.

In January 1998, before the second Gaza meeting, Faisal Hamdi Husseini, head of the legal committee appointed by the PNC, stated "There has been a decision to change the Covenant. The change has not yet been carried out". The AP reported that:

In a surprise development, the PLO's Executive Committee decided to take no action on amending articles in its charter... Palestinian Information Minister Yasser Abd Rabbo gave no reason why the committee failed to act on the charter.

UNISPAL, citing AFP and Reuters reported that:

The PLO Executive Committee, meeting in Ramallah, took no action on amending articles in the Palestinian charter which Israel views as seeking its destruction. The PA Information Minister Yasser Abed Rabbo told reporters the committee had only "reviewed" a letter PA President Arafat had given to President Clinton, listing the charter clauses annulled by the PNC.

PLO spokesman Marwan Kanafani was videotaped telling reporters, "This is not an amendment. This is a license to start a new charter."

In 2009, Fatah officials, among them Azzam al-Ahmad and Nabil Shaath, confirmed that the Charter would remain unchanged.

== See also ==
Works related to Constitution of Palestine at Wikisource

- History of the State of Palestine
- State of Palestine
- Palestinian territories
- Palestine Order in Council
- Palestine Arab Congress

== Bibliography ==
- Cobban, Helena (1984). The Palestinian Liberation Organization: People, Power and Politics. Cambridge University Press. ISBN 978-0-521-27216-2.
- Hirst, David (2003). The Gun and the Olive Branch: The Roots of Violence in the Middle East. Nation Books. ISBN 978-1-56025-483-6.
