= Palestine =

Country in West Asia

Coordinates: 32°00′N 35°15′E

State of Palestine دولة فلسطين (Arabic) Dawlat Filastin
- Flag Coat of arms
- Anthem: فدائي (Fidāʾiyy; "Warrior")
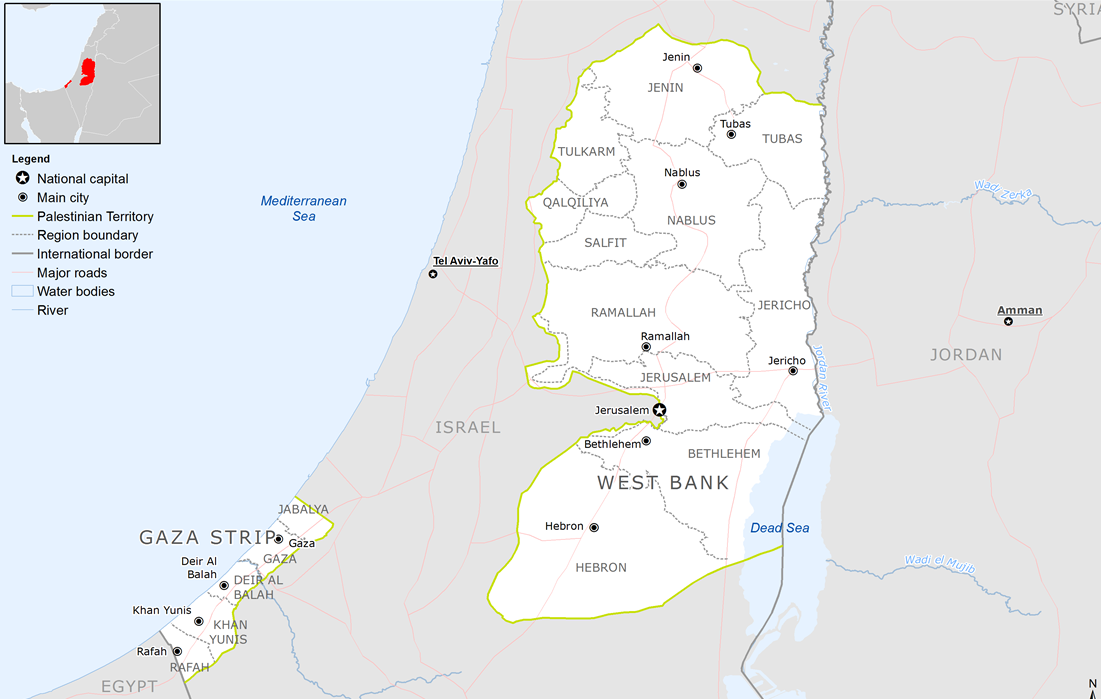
- Occupied Palestinian territories Territory officially annexed by Israel
- Status: UN observer state (Note: The United States, a permanent member of the Security Council with veto power, has consistently used its veto or threatened to do so to block Palestine's full membership to the UN.) under Israeli occupation Recognized by 157 UN member states
- Capital; Administrative center: Jerusalem (limited recognition) (Note: The Palestinian Declaration of Independence proclaims the "establishment of the State of Palestine on our Palestinian territory with its capital Jerusalem (Al-Quds Ash-Sharif)". Israel exercises de facto control over Jerusalem, but neither state's claims to Jerusalem are widely recognized by the international community. Ramallah is the administrative capital where government institutions and foreign representative offices are located, while most countries maintain their embassies to Israel in Tel Aviv. In the Oslo I Accord, a few parts of Jerusalem were placed under the control of the Palestinian government, but did not resolve the overall status of Jerusalem.); Ramallah (de facto)
- Largest city: Gaza (before 2023), currently in flux
- Official languages: Arabic
- Ethnic groups (2007): 91.2% Palestinian Arabs; 8.8% Israeli settlers (Note: Over 670,000 Israeli settlers live in the West Bank as of 2022; approximately 227,100 Israeli settlers live in East Jerusalem as of 2019. These settlements are widely regarded as illegal under international law.)
- Religion (2020): 80.73% Islam (official); 71.21% Sunni; 0.09% Shia; 9.42% other; 13.07% Judaism (Note: Israeli settlers under Israeli control); 0.88% Christianity; 0.05% Baháʼí Faith; 5.27% irreligion
- Demonym: Palestinian
- Government: Unitary semi-presidential republic under a provisional government
  - President: Mahmoud Abbas (Note: So far both presidents of the State of Palestine, Yasser Arafat and his successor Mahmoud Abbas, were appointed beforehand as Chairman of the Executive Committee of the Palestine Liberation Organization, the committee performing the functions of State of Palestine government. See also Leaders of Palestinian institutions.)
  - Vice President: Hussein al-Sheikh
  - Prime Minister: Mohammad Mustafa
  - Speaker of the Parliament: Aziz Dweik
- Legislature: Legislative Council

Formation
  - Declaration of Independence: 15 November 1988
  - Sovereignty dispute with Israel: Ongoing (Note: Israel allows the Palestinian National Authority to execute some functions in the Palestinian territories, depending on the area classification. It maintains minimal interference (retaining control of borders: air, sea beyond internal waters, land) in the Gaza Strip (its interior and Egypt portion of the land border are under Hamas control), and varying degrees of interference elsewhere. See also Israeli-occupied territories.)

Area
  - Total: 6,020 km^{2} (2,320 sq mi) (163rd)
  - Water (%): 3.5
  - West Bank: 5,655 km^{2}
  - Gaza Strip: 365 km^{2}

Population
  - 2023 estimate: 5,483,450 (121st)
  - Density: 731/km^{2} (1,893.3/sq mi)
- GDP (PPP): 2023 estimate
  - Total: ▲$36.391 billion (138th)
  - Per capita: ▲$6,642 (140th)
- GDP (nominal): 2023 estimate
  - Total: ▲$18.109 billion (121st)
  - Per capita: ▲$3,464 (131st)
- Gini (2016): ▼33.7 medium inequality
- HDI (2023): ▼0.674 medium (133rd)
- Currency: Israeli new shekel (ILS); Jordanian dinar (JOD); Egyptian pound (EGP)
- Time zone: UTC+2 (Palestine Standard Time)
  - Summer (DST): UTC+3 (Palestine Summer Time)
- Calling code: +970, +972
- ISO 3166 code: PS
- Internet TLD: .ps

Palestine, (Note: Arabic: فلسطين, romanized: Filasṭīn, pronounced [fɪlasˈtˤiːn]; Palestinian Arabic: Falasṭīn, pronounced [fɑlɑsˤˈtˤiːn].) (Note: Note that the name Palestine can commonly be interpreted as the entire territory of the former British Mandate, which today also incorporates Israel. The name is also officially used as the short-form reference to the State of Palestine, and this should be distinguished from other homonymous uses for the term including the Palestinian Authority, the Palestine Liberation Organization, and the subjects of other proposals for the establishment of a Palestinian state.) officially the State of Palestine, (Note: Arabic: دولة فلسطين, romanized: Dawlat Filasṭīn, pronounced [ˈdawlat fɪlasˈtˤiːn].) is a country in the Southern Levant region of West Asia. Situated between the Mediterranean Sea and Jordan River, it comprises the territories of the West Bank and the Gaza Strip, both of which are under occupation by Israel. Palestine shares the majority of its borders with Israel, while the West Bank borders Jordan to the east and the Gaza Strip borders Egypt to the southwest. The West Bank is divided between 165 Palestinian enclaves under partial civilian rule by the Palestinian Authority, and Area C, under full Israeli control. Palestine's population exceeds five million; its proclaimed capital is Jerusalem, while Ramallah serves as its de facto administrative center.

Situated at a continental crossroad, the Palestine region was ruled by various empires and experienced various demographic changes from antiquity to the modern era. The region has religious significance. The ongoing Israeli–Palestinian conflict dates back to the rise of the Zionist movement, supported by the United Kingdom during World War I. The war saw Britain occupying Palestine from the Ottoman Empire, where it set up Mandatory Palestine under the auspices of the League of Nations. Increased Jewish immigration led to intercommunal conflict between Jews and Palestinian Arabs, which escalated into a civil war in 1947 after a proposed partitioning by the United Nations was rejected by the Palestinians and other Arab nations.

The 1948 Palestine war saw the forcible displacement of a majority of the Arab population, and consequently the establishment of Israel; these events are referred to by Palestinians as the Nakba ('catastrophe'). In the Six-Day War in 1967, Israel occupied the West Bank and the Gaza Strip, which had been held by Jordan and Egypt respectively. The Palestine Liberation Organization (PLO) declared independence in 1988. In 1993, the PLO signed the Oslo Accords with Israel, creating limited PLO governance in the West Bank and Gaza Strip through the Palestinian Authority (PA). Israel withdrew from Gaza in its unilateral disengagement in 2005. In 2007, internal divisions between political factions led to a takeover of Gaza by Hamas. Since then, the West Bank has been governed in part by the Fatah-led PA, while the Gaza Strip has remained under the control of Hamas.

The Gaza Strip has long been subject to Israeli military occupation and an illegal blockade. Israel has also constructed large settlements in the occupied West Bank and East Jerusalem since 1967, which currently house more than 737,000 Israeli settlers, which are illegal under international law. Following the October 7 attacks by Hamas in Israel in 2023 which killed 1195 people, Israel launched a large-scale military operation in Gaza that has killed over 72,000 Palestinians, caused mass population displacement, a humanitarian crisis, and a famine in the Gaza Strip; these acts have been recognised as constituting genocide against the Palestinian people by a growing scholarly consensus.

Palestine is a permanent non-member observer state at the United Nations (UN) and is recognized as a sovereign state by 157 of the UN's 193 member states. The questions of Palestine's borders, legal and diplomatic status of Jerusalem, and the right of return of Palestinian refugees remain unsolved. Some of the other challenges to Palestine include restrictions on movement, ineffective government, and Israeli settlements and settler violence, as well as an overall poor security situation. Despite these challenges, the country maintains an emerging economy and sees frequent tourism. Arabic is the official language of the country. While the majority of Palestinians practice Islam, Christianity also has a presence. Palestine is also a member of several international organizations, including the Arab League and the Organization of Islamic Cooperation, UNESCO, and a delegation of parliamentarians sit at the Parliamentary Assembly of the Council of Europe.

== Etymology ==
The term "Palestine" (in Latin, Palæstina) comes via ancient Greek from a Semitic toponym for the general area dating back to the late second millennium BCE, a reflex of which is also to be found in the Biblical ethnonym Philistines. The term "Palestine" has been used to refer to the area at the southeast corner of the Mediterranean Sea beside Syria. In the 5th century BCE, Herodotus, in his work The Histories, used the term to describe a "district of Syria, called Palaistínē" (Ancient Greek: Συρίη ἡ Παλαιστίνη καλεομένη), in which Phoenicians interacted with other maritime peoples.

Currently, the terms "Palestine", "State of Palestine", and "occupied Palestinian territory (oPt or OPT)" are interchangeable depending on context. Specifically, the term "occupied Palestinian territory" refers as a whole to the geographical area of the Palestinian territory occupied by Israel since 1967. Palestine can, depending on contexts, be referred to as a country or a state, and its authorities can generally be identified as the Government of Palestine.

== History ==
In 1947, the UN adopted a partition plan for a two-state solution in the remaining territory of the mandate. The plan was accepted by the Jewish leadership but rejected by the Arab leaders, and Britain refused to implement the plan. On the eve of final British withdrawal, the Jewish Agency for Israel, headed by David Ben-Gurion, declared the establishment of the State of Israel according to the proposed UN plan. The Arab Higher Committee did not declare a state of its own and instead, together with Transjordan, Egypt, and the other members of the Arab League of the time, commenced military action resulting in the 1948 Arab–Israeli War. During the war, Israel gained additional territories that were designated to be part of the Arab state under the UN plan. Egypt occupied the Gaza Strip, and Transjordan occupied and then annexed the West Bank. Egypt initially supported the creation of an All-Palestine Government but disbanded it in 1959. Transjordan never recognized it and instead decided to incorporate the West Bank with its own territory to form Jordan. The annexation was ratified in 1950 but was rejected by the international community. The Six-Day War in 1967, when Israel fought against Egypt, Jordan, and Syria, ended with Israel occupying the West Bank and the Gaza Strip, besides other territories.

In 1964, when the West Bank was controlled by Jordan, the Palestine Liberation Organization was established there with the goal to confront Israel. The Palestinian National Charter of the PLO defines the boundaries of Palestine as the whole remaining territory of the mandate, including Israel. Following the Six-Day War, the PLO moved to Jordan, but later relocated to Lebanon in 1971.

The October 1974 Arab League summit designated the PLO as the "sole legitimate representative of the Palestinian people" and reaffirmed "the right of the Palestinian people to establish an independent national authority". In November 1974, the PLO was recognized as competent on all matters concerning the question of Palestine by the UN General Assembly granting them observer status as a "non-state entity" at the UN. After the 1988 Declaration of Independence, the UN General Assembly officially acknowledged the proclamation and decided to use the designation "Palestine" instead of "Palestine Liberation Organization" in the UN. In spite of this decision, the PLO did not participate at the UN in its capacity of the State of Palestine's government.

In 1978, through the Camp David Accords, Egypt signaled an end to any claim of its own over the Gaza Strip. In July 1988, Jordan ceded its claims to the West Bank—with the exception of guardianship over Haram al-Sharif—to the PLO. In November 1988, the PLO legislature, while in exile, declared the establishment of the "State of Palestine". In the month following, it was quickly recognised by many states, including Egypt and Jordan. In the Palestinian Declaration of Independence, the State of Palestine is described as being established on the "Palestinian territory", without explicitly specifying further. Because of this, some of the countries that recognised the State of Palestine in their statements of recognition refer to the "1967 borders", thus recognizing as its territory only the occupied Palestinian territory, and not Israel. The UN membership application submitted by the State of Palestine also specified that it is based on the "1967 borders". During the negotiations of the Oslo Accords, the PLO recognised Israel's right to exist, and Israel recognised the PLO as representative of the Palestinian people. The 1988 Palestinian Declaration of Independence included a PNC call for multilateral negotiations on the basis of UN Security Council Resolution 242 later known as "the Historic Compromise", implying acceptance of a two-state solution and no longer questioning the legitimacy of the State of Israel.

After Israel captured and occupied the West Bank from Jordan and Gaza Strip from Egypt, it began to establish Israeli settlements there. Administration of the Arab population of these territories was performed by the Israeli Civil Administration of the Coordinator of Government Activities in the Territories and by local municipal councils present since before the Israeli takeover. In 1980, Israel decided to freeze elections for these councils and to establish instead Village Leagues, whose officials were under Israeli influence. Later this model became ineffective for both Israel and the Palestinians, and the Village Leagues began to break up, with the last being the Hebron League, dissolved in February 1988.

Bill Clinton, Yitzhak Rabin and Yasser Arafat during Oslo Accords

In 1993, in the Oslo Accords, Israel acknowledged the PLO negotiating team as "representing the Palestinian people", in return for the PLO recognizing Israel's right to exist in peace, acceptance of UN Security Council resolutions 242 and 338, and its rejection of "violence and terrorism". As a result, in 1994 the PLO established the Palestinian National Authority (PNA or PA) territorial administration, that exercises some governmental functions in parts of the West Bank and the Gaza Strip. In 2007, the Hamas takeover of Gaza Strip politically and territorially divided the Palestinians, with Abbas's Fatah left largely ruling the West Bank and recognized internationally as the official Palestinian Authority, while Hamas secured its control over the Gaza Strip. In April 2011, the Palestinian parties signed an agreement of reconciliation, but its implementation had stalled until a unity government was formed on 2 June 2014.

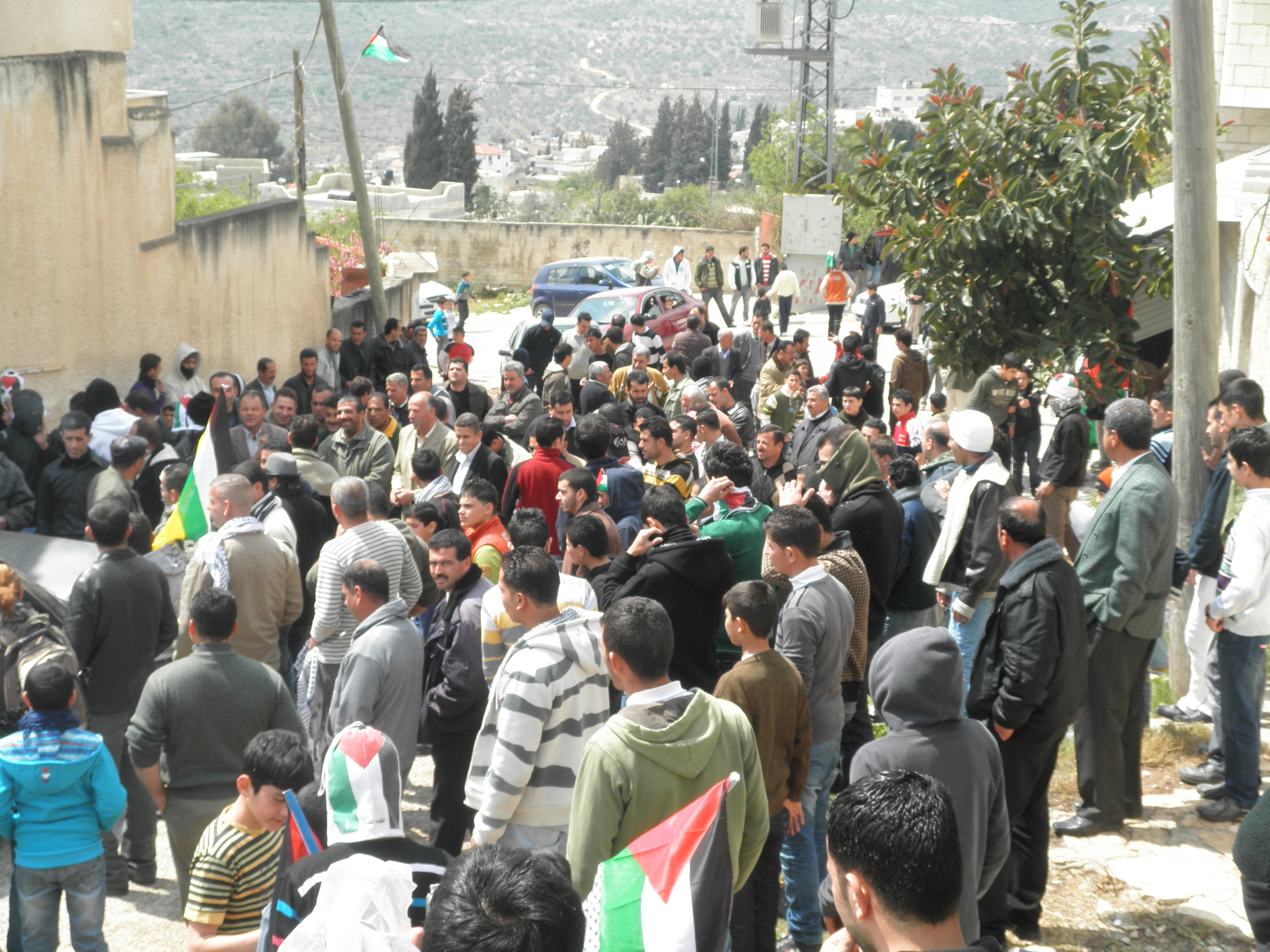
Demonstration against road block, Kafr Qaddum, March 2012

As envisioned in the Oslo Accords, Israel allowed the PLO to establish interim administrative institutions in the Palestinian territories, which came in the form of the PNA. It was given civilian control in Area B and civilian and security control in Area A, and remained without involvement in Area C. In 2005, following the implementation of Israel's unilateral disengagement plan, the PNA gained full control of the Gaza Strip with the exception of its borders, airspace, and territorial waters. Following the inter-Palestinian conflict in 2006, Hamas took over control of the Gaza Strip (it already had majority in the PLC), and Fatah took control of the West Bank. From 2007, the Gaza Strip was governed by Hamas, and the West Bank by Fatah.

The Hamas led October 7 attacks on Israel in 2023 were followed by the Gaza war. The war has caused widespread destruction, a humanitarian crisis, and a famine in the Gaza Strip. Most of the Palestinian population in Gaza was forcibly displaced. Since the start of the war, over 72,000 Palestinians in Gaza have been killed, more than half of them are women and children, and more than 148,000 injured. Israel has committed genocide against the Palestinian people during its ongoing invasion and bombing of the Gaza Strip. A study in The Lancet estimated 64,260 deaths in Gaza from traumatic injuries by June 2024, while noting a potentially larger death toll when "indirect" deaths are included. As of May 2025, a comparable figure for traumatic-injury deaths would be 93,000. There was also a spillover of the war occurring in the West Bank.

In an attempt to keep alive the possibility of peace and a two-state solution following the Gaza war, the UK, Australia, Canada and France recognized a Palestinian state in late 2025.

== Geography ==
Mandatory Palestine in 1946

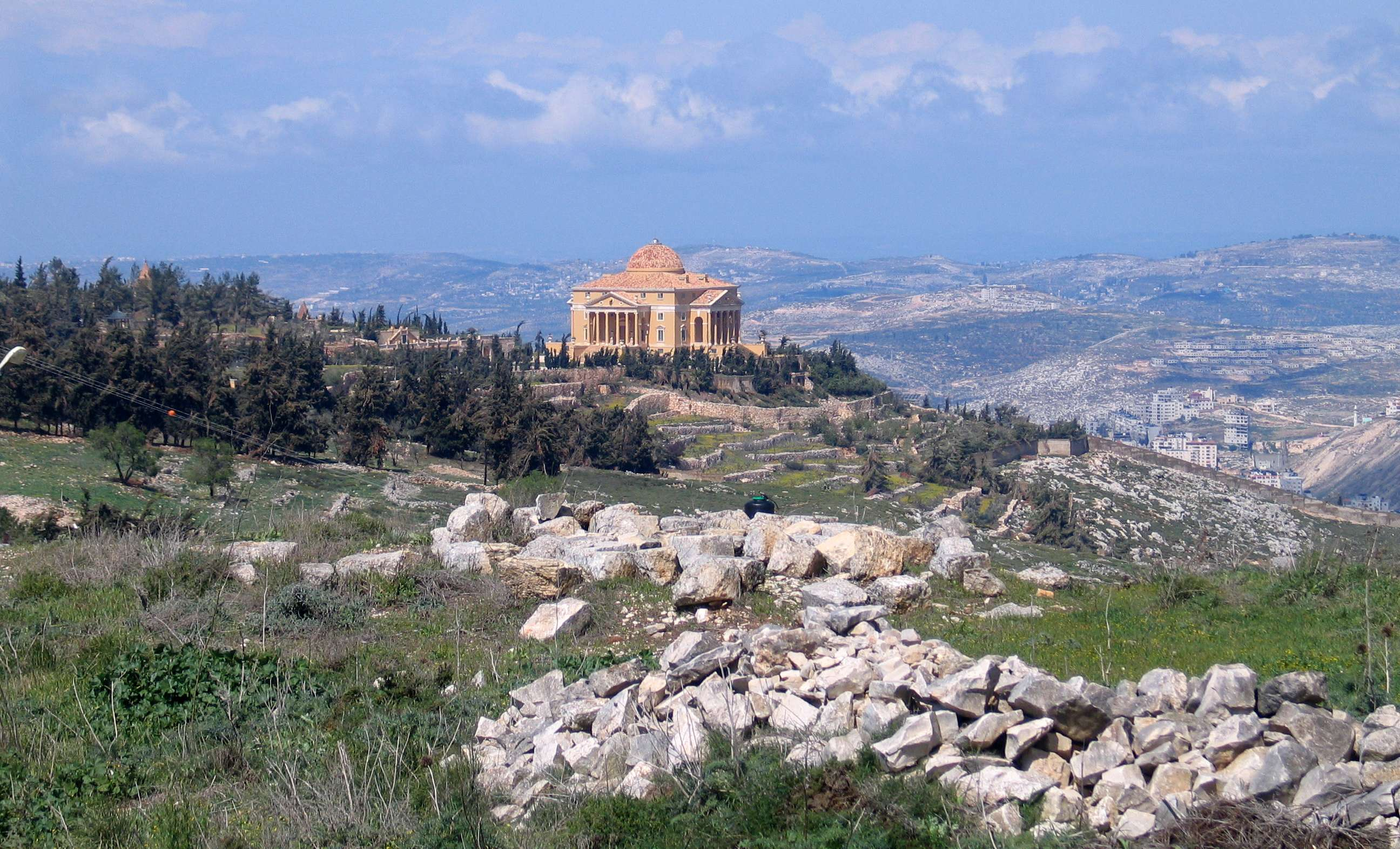
Located around Nablus, Mount Gerizim is the holiest site for Samaritans.

Areas claimed by the country, known as the Palestinian territories, lie in the Southern Levant of the Middle East region. Palestine is part of the Fertile Crescent, along with Israel, Jordan, Lebanon, Iraq and Syria. The Gaza Strip borders the Mediterranean Sea to the west, Egypt to the south, and Israel to the north and east. The West Bank is bordered by Jordan to the east, and Israel to the north, south, and west. Palestine shares its maritime borders with Israel, Egypt and Cyprus. Thus, the two enclaves constituting the area claimed by the State of Palestine have no geographical border with one another, being separated by Israel. These areas would constitute the world's 163rd largest country by land area.

Three terrestrial ecoregions are found in the area: Eastern Mediterranean conifer–sclerophyllous–broadleaf forests, Arabian Desert, and Mesopotamian shrub desert. Palestine has a number of environmental issues; issues facing the Gaza Strip include desertification; salination of fresh water; sewage treatment; water-borne diseases; soil degradation; and depletion and contamination of underground water resources. In the West Bank, many of the same issues apply; although fresh water is much more plentiful, access is restricted by the ongoing dispute.

=== Climate ===
Palestine, which experiences hot, dry summers and cool, rainy winters, is located in the subtropical Mediterranean region on the edge of the desert. The climate in the West Bank is mostly Mediterranean, slightly cooler at elevated areas compared with the shoreline, west to the area. In the east, the West Bank includes much of the Judean Desert including the western shoreline of the Dead Sea, characterized by dry and hot climate. Gaza has a hot semi-arid climate (Köppen: BSh) with mild winters and dry hot summers. Along the coast and mountains, the average annual rainfall ranges from 25 to 27 inches. Gaza has an annual average of roughly 16 inches of rain.

It is one of the countries most vulnerable to climate change despite its negligible contribution to global emissions. Palestine is facing substantial environmental challenges due to its delicate environmental resources, lack of sovereignty and its limited financial assets.

=== Biodiversity ===
Palestine connects Africa and Eurasia and features a rich flora and fauna shaped by its geological history and varied topography. It encompasses 5 ecological zones (Central Highlands, Semi-coastal Region, Eastern Slopes, Jordan Rift Valley, and Coastal Regions) and 5 phytogeographical areas (Coastal, Mediterranean, Irano-Turanian, Saharo-Arabian, and Sudanese/Ethiopian). A total of 373 bird species belonging to 23 orders, 69 families, 21 subfamilies, and 172 genera have been recorded in the occupied Palestinian areas. Historically, these mild climate conditions and rich natural resources allowed early human populations to transition from hunter-gatherers to agricultural and nomadic shepherd communities.

Despite its ecological significance, local biodiversity faces severe pressure from habitat fragmentation, desertification, industrial pollution, and ongoing colonization. 81% of designated protected areas lie within Area C under Israeli military rule. The annual flow of the Jordan River has plummeted from 1,250 million cubic meters (mcm) per year to less than 20 mcm. Factors such as settlement expansion, military zoning, wastewater dumping, and land confiscation have fragmented habitats and compromised native ecosystems.

== Government and politics ==
Mahmoud Abbas
President

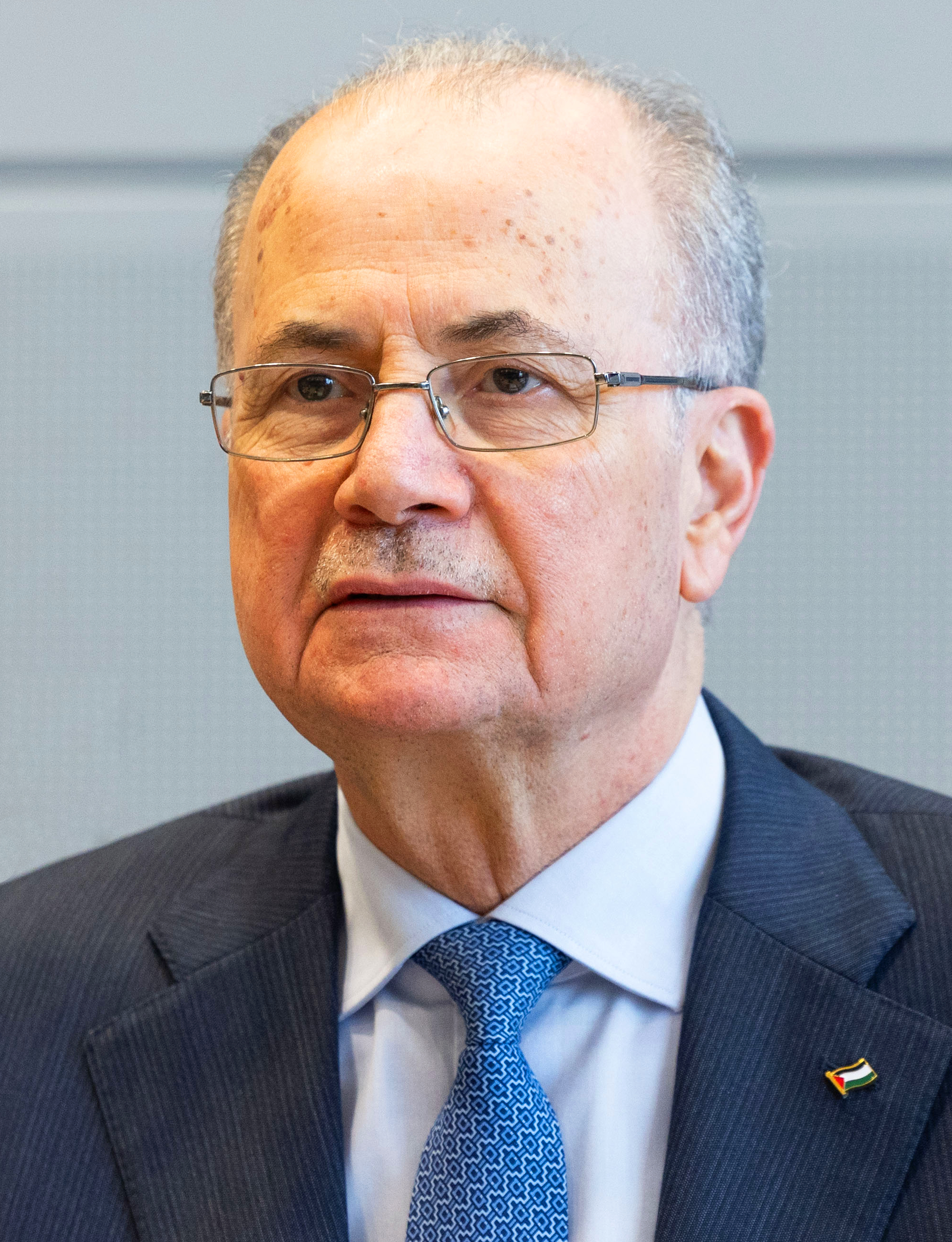
Mohammad Mustafa
Prime Minister

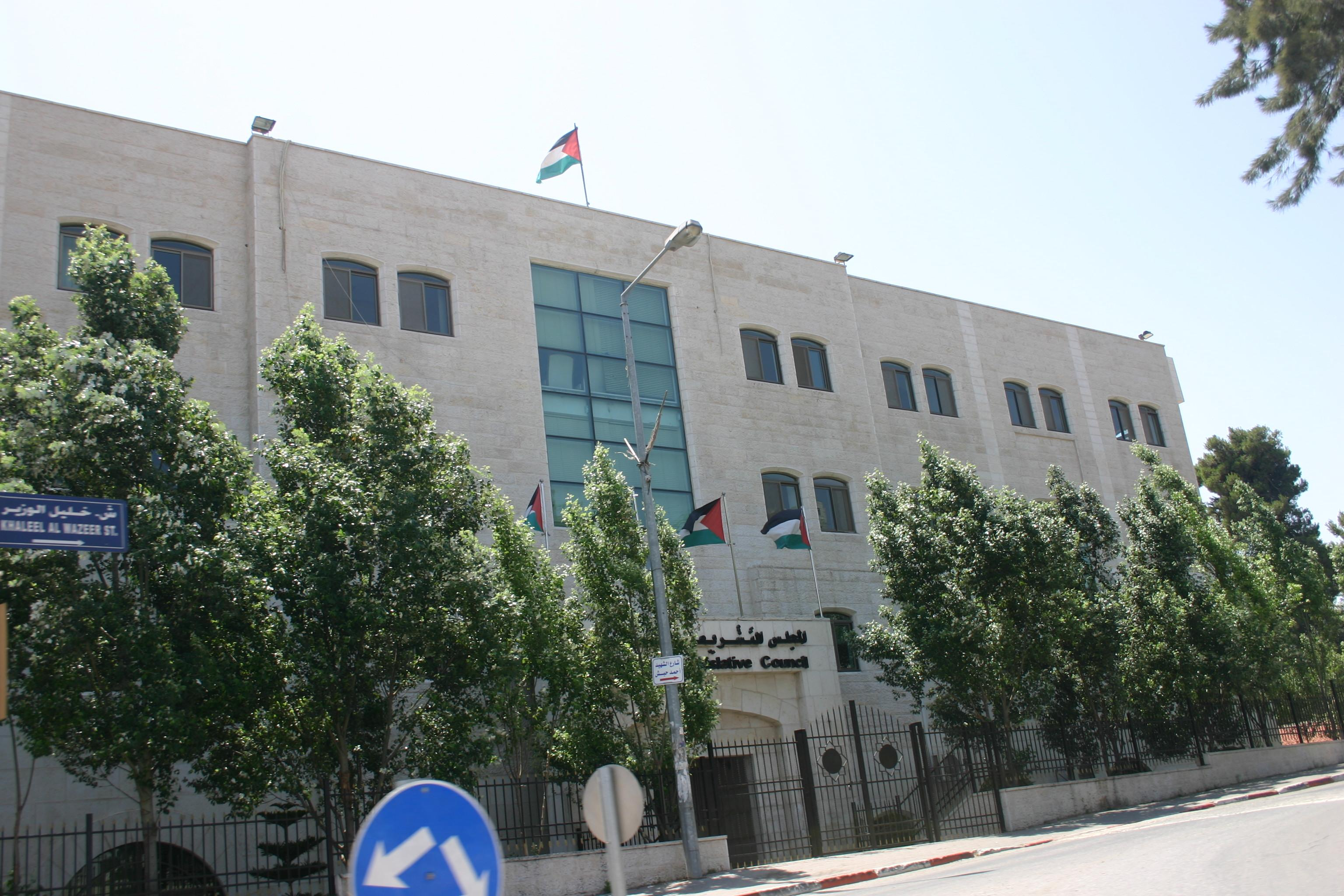
The Palestinian Legislative Council, home to the Palestinian parliament.

Palestine operates a unitary and semi-presidential system of government. The country consists of the institutions that are associated with the Palestine Liberation Organization (PLO), which includes the president of the State of Palestine, who is appointed by the Palestinian Central Council, the Palestinian National Council, and the Executive Committee of the Palestine Liberation Organization, which performs the functions of a government in exile, maintaining an extensive foreign-relations network. The PLO is combination of several political parties.

These should be distinguished from the president of the Palestinian National Authority, Palestinian Legislative Council, and PNA Cabinet, all of which are instead associated with the Palestinian National Authority (PNA). Palestine's founding document is the Palestinian Declaration of Independence, which should be distinguished from the unrelated PLO Palestinian National Covenant and PNA Palestine Basic Law.

=== Administrative divisions ===
Palestinian Governorates (official)

Palestinian-controlled areas

The State of Palestine is divided into sixteen administrative divisions. The governorates in the West Bank are grouped into three areas per the Oslo II Accord. Area A forms 18% of the West Bank by area and is administered by the Palestinian government. Area B forms 22% of the West Bank and is under Palestinian civil control and joint Israeli–Palestinian security control.

Area C, except East Jerusalem, forms 60% of the West Bank and is administered by the Israeli Civil Administration. The Palestinian government provides the education and medical services to the 150,000 Palestinians in the area, an arrangement agreed upon in the Oslo II accord by Israeli and Palestinian leadership.

More than 99% of Area C is off-limits to Palestinians, due to security concerns, and is a point of ongoing negotiation. In the occupied West Bank, including East Jerusalem, there are over 750,000 Israeli settlers living in 147 settlements and outposts. Although Area C is under martial law, Israelis living there are entitled to full civic rights. Palestinian enclaves currently under Palestinian administration in red (Areas A and B; not including Gaza Strip, which is under Hamas rule).

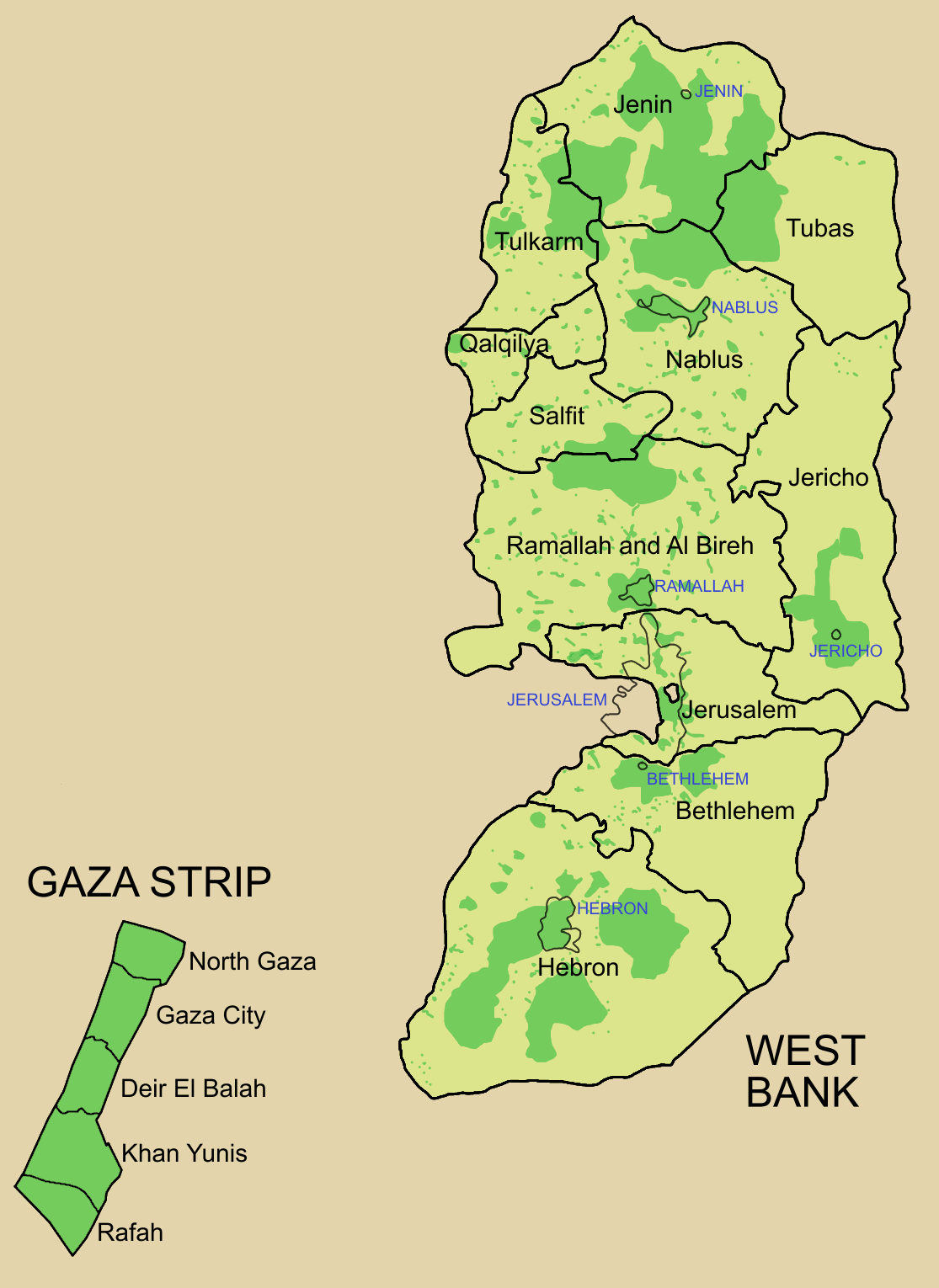
Governorates of Palestine

East Jerusalem, comprising the small pre-1967 Jordanian eastern-sector Jerusalem municipality, together with a significant area of the pre-1967 West Bank demarcated by Israel in 1967, is administered as part of the Jerusalem District of Israel. It is claimed by Palestine as part of the Jerusalem Governorate. It was effectively annexed by Israel in 1967, by application of Israeli law, jurisdiction and administration under a 1948 law amended for the purpose, this purported annexation being constitutionally reaffirmed (by implication) in Basic Law: Jerusalem 1980, but this annexation is not recognized by any other country.

In 2010, of the 456,000 people in East Jerusalem, roughly 60% were Palestinians and 40% were Israelis.

Name	Area (km^{2})	Population	Density (per km^{2})	Muhafazah (district capital)
Jenin Governorate	583	311,231	533.8	Jenin
Tubas Governorate	402	64,719	161.0	Tubas
Tulkarm Governorate	246	182,053	740.0	Tulkarm
Nablus Governorate	605	380,961	629.7	Nablus
Qalqilya Governorate	166	110,800	667.5	Qalqilya
Salfit Governorate	204	70,727	346.7	Salfit
Ramallah and al-Bireh Governorate	855	348,110	407.1	Ramallah
Jericho Governorate	593	52,154	87.9	Jericho
Jerusalem Governorate	345	419,108^{a}	1214.8 (Note: Data from Jerusalem includes occupied East Jerusalem with its Israeli population)	Jerusalem (see Status of Jerusalem)
Bethlehem Governorate	659	216,114	327.9	Bethlehem
Hebron Governorate	997	706,508	708.6	Hebron
North Gaza Governorate	61	362,772	5947.1	Jabalya
Gaza Governorate	74	625,824	8457.1	Gaza
Deir al-Balah Governorate	58	264,455	4559.6	Deir al-Balah
Khan Yunis Governorate	108	341,393	3161.0	Khan Yunis
Rafah Governorate	64	225,538	3524.0	Rafah

=== Foreign relations ===
Nations with which Palestine has diplomatic relations.

Representation of the State of Palestine is performed by the Palestine Liberation Organization (PLO). In states that recognise the State of Palestine it maintains embassies. The Palestine Liberation Organization is represented in various international organizations as member, associate or observer. Because of inconclusiveness in sources in some cases it is impossible to distinguish whether the participation is executed by the PLO as representative of the State of Palestine, by the PLO as a non-state entity or by the PNA.

On 15 December 1988, the State of Palestine's declaration of independence of November 1988 was acknowledged in the General Assembly with Resolution 43/177.

On 29 November 2012, UN General Assembly resolution 67/19 passed, upgrading Palestine to "non-member observer state" status in the United Nations. The change in status was described as "de facto recognition of the sovereign state of Palestine".

In 2013 the Swedish Parliament upgraded the status of the Palestinian representative office in the country to full embassy status. On 3 October 2014, new Swedish Prime Minister Stefan Löfven used his inaugural address in parliament to announce that Sweden would recognise the state of Palestine. The official decision to do so was made on 30 October, making Sweden the first EU member state outside of the former communist bloc to recognise the state of Palestine. In February 2015, Mahmoud Abbas visited Sweden to open the new embassy, and Löfven said "According to our view, Palestine is from now on a state." As of 2025, 16 of the EU's 27 member states recognise Palestine.

On 13 October 2014, the UK House of Commons voted by 274 to 12 in favour of recognising Palestine as a state. The House of Commons backed the move "as a contribution to securing a negotiated two-state solution"—although less than half of MPs took part in the vote. However, the UK government is not bound to do anything as a result of the vote: its current policy is that it "reserves the right to recognise a Palestinian state bilaterally at the moment of our choosing and when it can best help bring about peace".

On 2 December 2014, the French parliament voted by 339 to 151 in favour of urging their government to recognise Palestine as a state. The text, proposed by the ruling Socialists and backed by left-wing parties and some conservatives, asked the government to "use the recognition of a Palestinian state with the aim of resolving the conflict definitively".

On 31 December 2014, the United Nations Security Council voted down a resolution demanding the end of Israeli occupation and statehood by 2017. Eight members voted for the Resolution (Russia, China, France, Argentina, Chad, Chile, Jordan, Luxembourg), however following strenuous US and Israeli efforts to defeat the resolution, it did not get the minimum of nine votes needed to pass the resolution. Australia and the United States voted against the resolution, with five other nations abstaining.

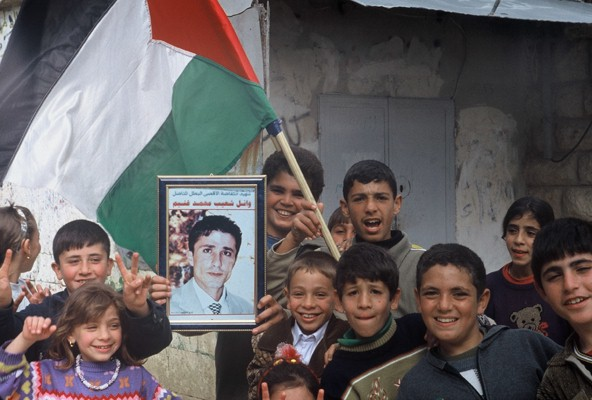
Children waving a Palestinian flag, West Bank.

On 16 January 2015, the International Criminal Court announced that, since Palestine was granted observer State status in the UN by the UNGA, it must be considered a "State" for the purposes of accession to the Rome Statute.

On 13 May 2015, the Vatican announced it was shifting recognition from the PLO to the State of Palestine, confirming recognition of Palestine as a state after the UN vote of 2012. Monsignor Antoine Camilleri, Vatican foreign minister, said the change was in line with the evolving position of the Holy See, which has referred unofficially to the State of Palestine since Pope Francis's visit to the Holy Land in May 2014.

On 23 December 2015, the UN General Assembly adopted a resolution demanding Palestinian sovereignty over the natural resources in the Palestinian territories under Israeli occupation. It called on Israel to desist from the exploitation, damage, cause of loss or depletion and endangerment of Palestinian natural resources, the right of Palestinians to seek restitution for extensive destruction. The motion was passed by 164 votes to 5, with Canada, Federated States of Micronesia, Israel, Marshall Islands, and the United States opposing.

As of 23 September 2025, 157 (81.3%) of the 193 member states of the United Nations have recognised the State of Palestine. Many of the countries that do not recognise the State of Palestine nevertheless recognise the PLO as the "representative of the Palestinian people". The PLO's executive committee is empowered by the PNC to perform the functions of government of the State of Palestine.

=== Status and recognition ===
The Palestine Liberation Organization (PLO) declared the establishment of the State of Palestine on 15 November 1988. There is a wide range of views on the legal status of the State of Palestine, both among international states and legal scholars. The existence of a state of Palestine is recognized by the states that have established bilateral diplomatic relations with it. In January 2015, the International Criminal Court affirmed Palestine's "State" status after its UN observer recognition, a move condemned by Israeli leaders as a form of "diplomatic terrorism".

In December 2015, the UN General Assembly passed a resolution demanding Palestinian sovereignty over natural resources in the occupied territories. It called on Israel to cease exploitation and damage while granting Palestinians the right to seek restitution. In 1988, the State of Palestine's declaration of independence was acknowledged by the General Assembly with Resolution 43/177. In 2012, the United Nations General Assembly passed Resolution 67/19, granting Palestine "non-member observer state" status, effectively recognizing it as a sovereign state.

In August 2015, Palestine's representatives at the United Nations presented a draft resolution that would allow the non-member observer states Palestine and the Holy See to raise their flags at the United Nations headquarters. Initially, the Palestinians presented their initiative as a joint effort with the Holy See, which the Holy See denied. In a letter to the Secretary General and the President of the General Assembly, Israel's Ambassador at the UN Ron Prosor called the step "another cynical misuse of the UN ... in order to score political points". After the vote, which was passed by 119 votes to 8 with 45 countries abstaining, the US Ambassador Samantha Power said that "raising the Palestinian flag will not bring Israelis and Palestinians any closer together". US Department of State spokesman Mark Toner called it a "counterproductive" attempt to pursue statehood claims outside of a negotiated settlement.

At the ceremony itself, UN Secretary-General Ban Ki-moon said the occasion was a "day of pride for the Palestinian people around the world, a day of hope", and declared "Now is the time to restore confidence by both Israelis and Palestinians for a peaceful settlement and, at last, the realization of two states for two peoples."

=== International recognition ===
State of Palestine Countries that have recognized Palestine (Note: States whose governments dispute their recognition of Palestine (The Czech Republic and Papua New Guinea)) Countries that have not recognized Palestine

The State of Palestine has been recognized by 157 of the 193 UN members and since 2012 has had a status of a non-member observer state in the United Nations. This limited status is largely due to the fact that the United States, a permanent member of the UN Security Council with veto power, has consistently used its veto or threatened to do so to block Palestine's full UN membership.

On 29 November 2012, in a 138–9 vote (with 41 abstentions and 5 absences), the United Nations General Assembly passed resolution 67/19, upgrading Palestine from an "observer entity" to a "non-member observer state" within the United Nations System, which was described as recognition of the PLO's sovereignty. Palestine's UN status is equivalent to that of the Holy See. The UN has permitted Palestine to title its representative office to the UN as "The Permanent Observer Mission of the State of Palestine to the United Nations". Palestine has instructed its diplomats to officially represent "The State of Palestine"—no longer the Palestinian National Authority.

On 17 December 2012, UN Chief of Protocol Yeocheol Yoon declared that "the designation of 'State of Palestine' shall be used by the Secretariat in all official United Nations documents", thus recognizing the title 'State of Palestine' as the state's official name for all UN purposes. On 21 December 2012, a UN memorandum discussed appropriate terminology to be used following GA 67/19. It was noted therein that there was no legal impediment to using the designation Palestine to refer to the geographical area of the Palestinian territory. At the same time, it was explained that there was also no bar to the continued use of the term "Occupied Palestinian Territory including East Jerusalem" or such other terminology as might customarily be used by the Assembly.

As of 23 September 2025, 157 (81.3%) of the 193 member states of the United Nations have recognized the State of Palestine. Many of the countries that do not recognize the State of Palestine nevertheless recognize the PLO as the "representative of the Palestinian people". The PLO's Executive Committee is empowered by the Palestinian National Council to perform the functions of government of the State of Palestine.

On 2 April 2024, Riyad Mansour, the Palestinian ambassador to the UN, requested that the Security Council consider a renewed application for membership. As of April, seven UNSC members recognize Palestine but the US has indicated that it opposes the request and in addition, US law stipulates that US funding for the UN would be cut off in the event of full recognition without an Israeli–Palestinian agreement. On 18 April, the US vetoed a widely supported UN resolution that would have admitted Palestine as a full UN member.

A May 2024 UNGA resolution came into force with the 2024 general assembly. The resolution, which recognized the Palestinian right to become a full member state, also granted the right to Palestinians to submit proposals and amendments and Palestine was permitted to take a seat with other member states in the assembly.

=== Military ===
The Palestinian Security Services (PSS) are the armed forces and intelligence agencies of the State of Palestine. They comprise twelve branches, notably the Security Forces, the civil police, the Presidential Guard and the national security forces. The President of the Palestinian National Authority is Commander-in-Chief of the Palestinian Forces.

=== Law and security ===
The State of Palestine has a number of security forces, including a Civil Police Force, National Security Forces and Intelligence Services, with the function of maintaining security and protecting Palestinian citizens and the Palestinian State.

== Economy ==
The State of Palestine's overall gross-domestic-product (GDP) declined by 35% in the first quarter of 2024, due to the ongoing war in Gaza, the Palestinian Central Bureau of Statistics (PCBS) reports.

=== Agriculture ===
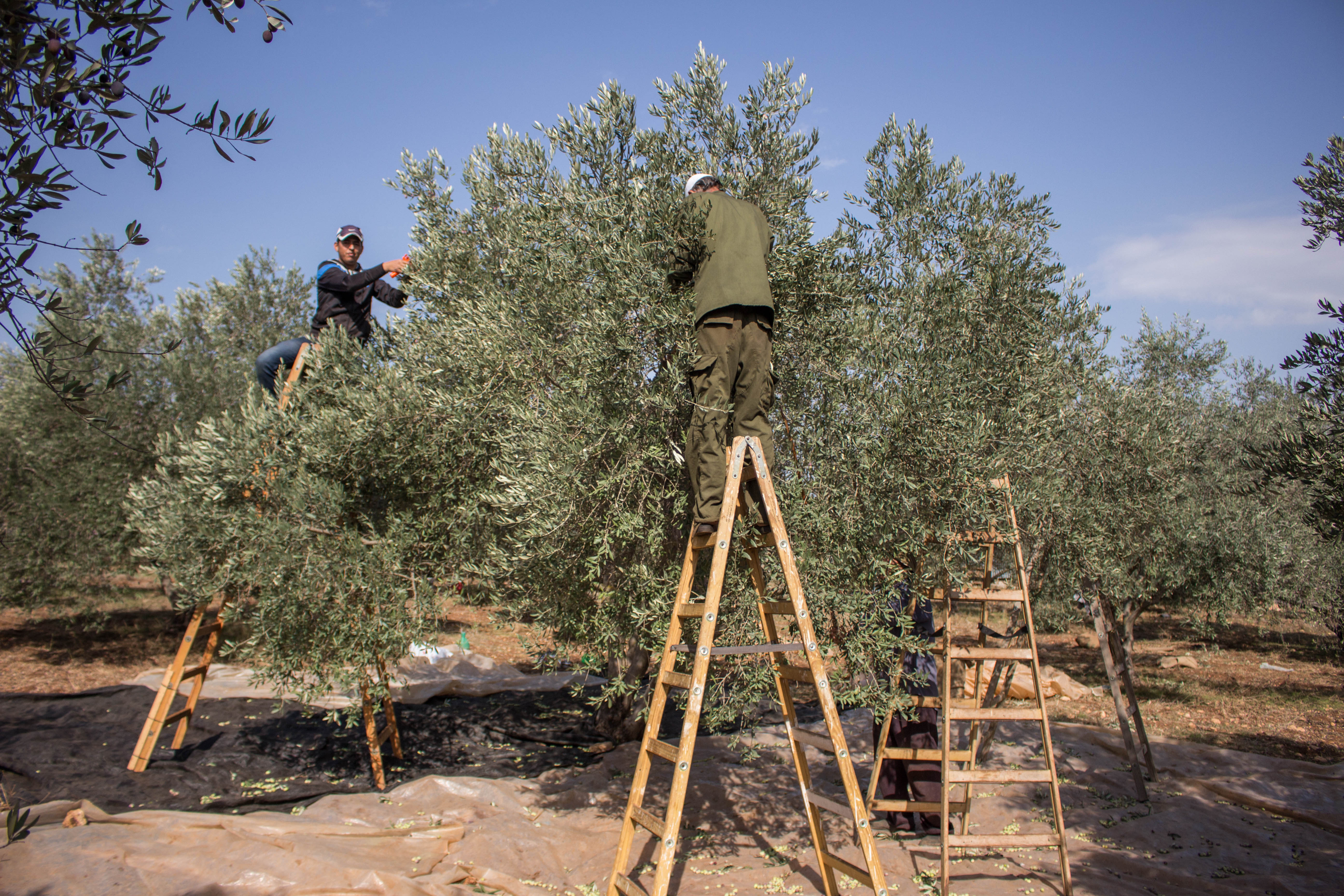
Palestinian farmers harvesting olives using traditional methods.

Agriculture is a mainstay in the economy of Palestine. The production of agricultural goods supports the population's sustenance needs and fuels Palestine's export economy. According to the Council for European Palestinian Relations, the agricultural sector formally employs 13.4% of the population and accounts for 90% of informal employment In the late 2000s unemployment rates in Palestine increased, and the agricultural sector became the most impoverished sector in Palestine. Unemployment rates peaked in 2008 when they reached 41% in the Gaza Strip.

According to World Bank, Palestinian agriculture suffers from widespread use of land for nature reserves as well as military and settler use. Because the root of the conflict is with land, the disputes between Israel and Palestine are well-manifested in the agriculture of Palestine.

=== Water supply and sanitation ===
Water supply and sanitation in the Palestinian territories are characterized by severe water shortage and are highly influenced by the Israeli occupation. The water resources of Palestine are partially controlled by Israel, due in part to historical and geographical complexities, with Israel granting partial autonomy in 2017. The division of groundwater is subject to provisions in the Oslo II Accord, agreed upon by both Israeli and Palestinian leadership. Israel provides the Palestinian territories water from its own water supply and desalinated water supplies, in 2012 supplying 52 MCM.

Generally, the water quality is considerably worse in the Gaza Strip when compared to the West Bank. About a third to half of the delivered water in the Palestinian territories is lost in the distribution network. The lasting blockade of the Gaza Strip and the Gaza War have caused severe damage to the infrastructure in the Gaza Strip. Concerning wastewater, the existing treatment plants do not have the capacity to treat all of the produced wastewater, causing severe water pollution. The development of the sector highly depends on external financing.

=== Energy ===
Palestine produces no oil or natural gas, and is predominantly dependent on the Israel Electric Corporation (IEC) for electricity. Between 2000 and 2023, Palestine's energy consumption grew from 6TWh to 24TWh. In the same period, generation of energy in Palestine grew from 0.03TWh (approximately 0.5% of consumption) to 1.02TWh (4%). The only domestic source of energy is the disputed Gaza Marine gas field, which has not yet been developed. According to UNCTAD, the Palestinian Territory "lies above sizeable reservoirs of oil and natural gas wealth" but "occupation continues to prevent Palestinians from developing their energy fields so as to exploit and benefit from such assets." In 2012, electricity available in the West Bank and Gaza was 5,370 GW-hour (3,700 in the West Bank and 1,670 in Gaza), while the annual per capita consumption of electricity (after deducting transmission loss) was 950 kWh. National sources only produce 445 GWh of electricity, supplying less than 10% of demand.

=== Oil and gas ===
The reserves of natural gas were found offshore in the Gaza Strip in 2000, within the framework of licensing to British Gas by the Palestinian Authority. The discovered Gaza Marine gas field, though mediocre in size, had been considered at the time as one of the possible drives to boost Palestinian economy and promote regional cooperation.

With the Hamas takeover of the Gaza Strip in 2007, the chances for developing the gas field reduced, due to a stand-off with the Palestinian administration and Israel's refusal to deal with Hamas. The chances further diminished with the discovery of major gas fields in the Israeli economic waters in 2009 and 2010, making Israel an unlikely customer for the Palestinian gas. In 2023 Israel has given preliminary approval for the development of the Gaza Marine gas field, with the involvement of the Palestinian Authority and Egypt, but, as of 2024, Gaza's natural gas was still underwater.

=== Transport ===
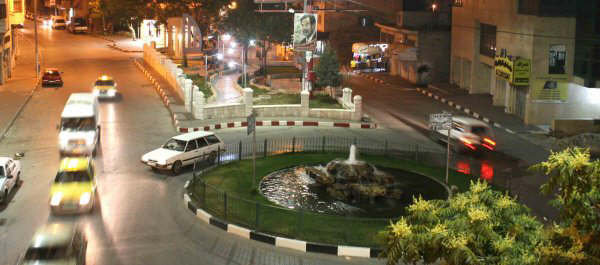
King Faisal Street in Hebron

The transportation consists of two non-contiguous territories, the West Bank and the Gaza Strip, different parts of which are administered by Palestinian Authority, Gaza Strip and Israel.

In 2010, the West Bank and Gaza Strip together had 4,686 km (2,912 mi) of roadways.

The Port of Gaza is a small port near the Rimal district of Gaza City. It is the home port of Palestinian fishing-boats and the base of the Palestinian Naval Police, a branch of the Palestinian National Security Forces. Under the Oslo II Accord, the activities of the Palestinian Naval Police are restricted to 6 nautical miles from the coast. The Port of Gaza has been under naval blockade since 2007, and activities at the port have been restricted to small-scale fishing.

There were three defunct airports in the Palestinian territories. The Yasser Arafat International Airport (previously called Gaza International Airport), located in the Gaza Strip. The airport was closed in October 2000 by Israeli order after the breakout of the Second Intifada.

West Bank Palestinians traveling abroad can use the Allenby Bridge to enter Jordan and then use the Queen Alia International Airport in Amman, or the Eilat-Ramon Airport in Be'er Ora to fly abroad. The bridge is currently the sole designated exit/entry point for West Bank Palestinians traveling abroad.

The Erez Crossing is the only crossing on the Gaza–Israel barrier between the Gaza Strip and Israel, and has been affected by the Israeli blockade of the Gaza Strip.

The Rafah Crossing is the only land crossing between the Gaza Strip and Egypt. There exists also the Kerem Shalom border crossing, managed by Israel, but used exclusively for the crossing of goods from Egypt into Gaza. The Karni crossing was a cargo terminal on the Israel-Gaza Strip barrier located in the north-eastern end of the Gaza Strip to allow Palestinian merchants to export and import goods. This was done as a 'back-to-back' transfer, meaning that Palestinian products meant for export were removed from a Palestinian truck and placed in an Israeli truck, or vice versa for incoming goods. Israel closed the Karni crossing after Hamas took over the Gaza Strip in June 2007, and the closure was made permanent at the end of March 2011.

=== Tourism ===
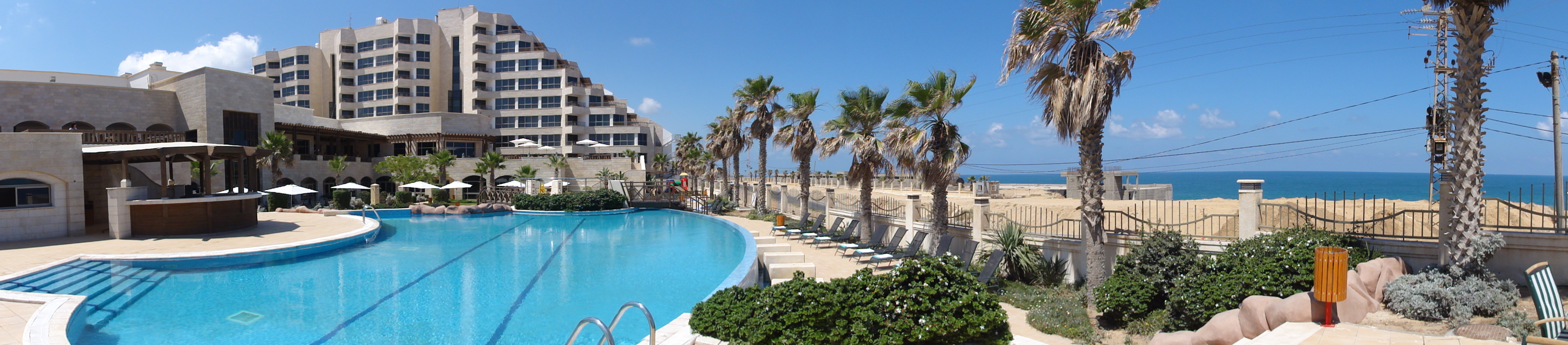
Al Mashtal Hotel in Gaza, before the Gaza war.

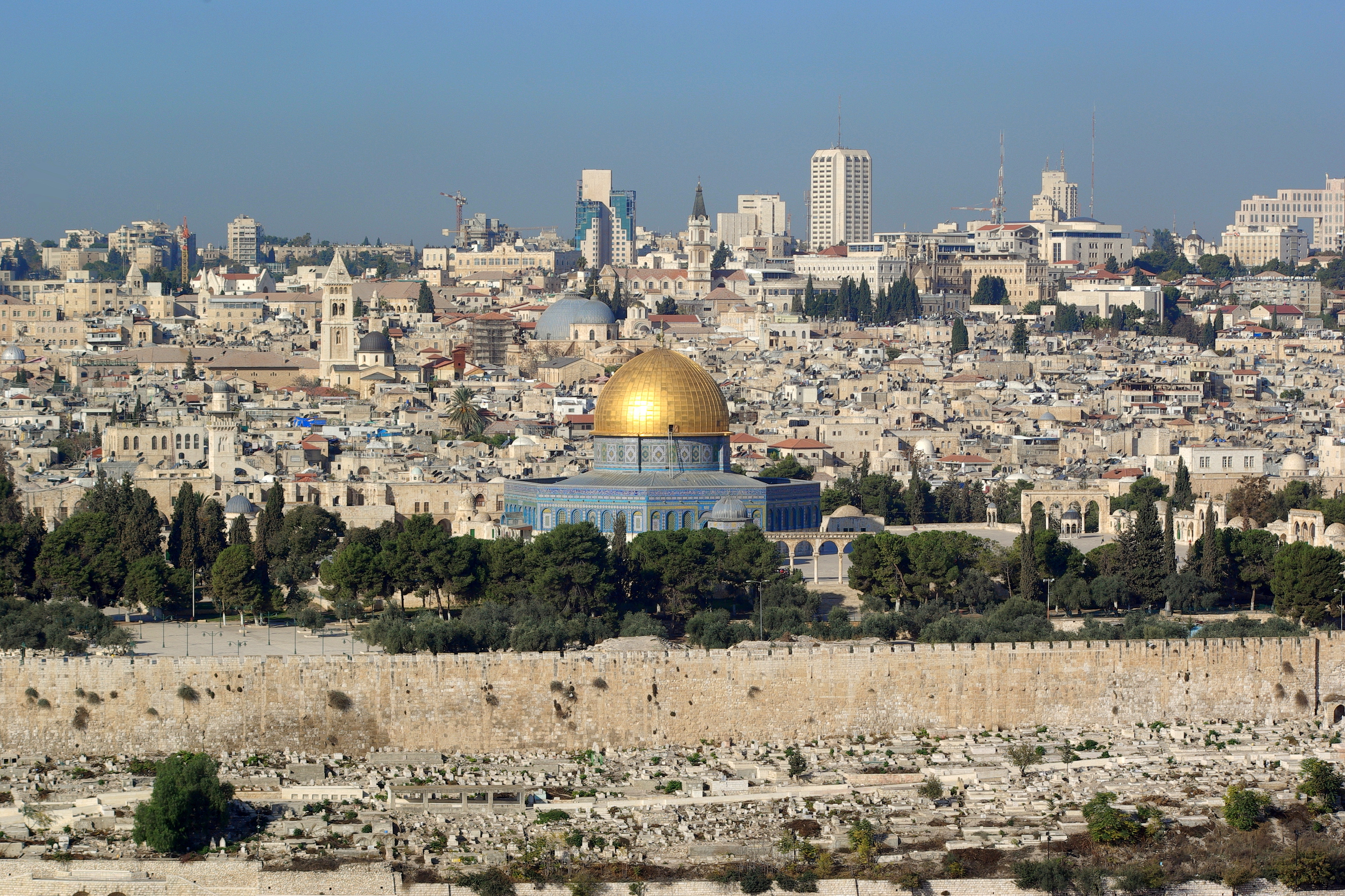
Jerusalem is holy for three of the world's major religions — Christianity, Islam and Judaism.

In 2010, 4.6 million people visited the Palestinian territories, compared to 2.6 million in 2009. Of that number, 2.2 million were foreign tourists, while 2.7 million were domestic. Most tourists come for only a few hours or as part of a day trip itinerary. In the last quarter of 2012 over 150,000 guests stayed in West Bank hotels. 40% were European and 9% were from the United States and Canada. Lonely Planet travel guide writes that "the West Bank is not the easiest place in which to travel but the effort is richly rewarded."

In 2013, Palestinian Authority Tourism minister Rula Ma'aya stated that her government aims to encourage international visits to Palestine, but the occupation is the main factor preventing the tourism sector from becoming a major income source to Palestinians. There are no visa conditions imposed on foreign nationals other than those imposed by the visa policy of Israel. Access to Jerusalem, the West Bank, and Gaza is completely controlled by the government of Israel. Entry to the occupied Palestinian territories requires only a valid international passport.

=== Communications ===
The high tech industry in Palestine, have experienced good growth since 2008. In 2020, the Palestinian Central Bureau of Statistics (PCBS) and the Ministry of Telecom and Information Technology said there were 4.2 million cellular mobile subscribers in Palestine compared to 2.6 million at the end of 2010. The number of ADSL subscribers in Palestine increased to about 363 thousand by the end of 2019, from 119 thousand over the same period. In 2020, 97% of Palestinian households had at least one cellular mobile line. At least one smartphone is owned by 86% of households (91% in the West Bank and 78% in Gaza Strip). About 80% of the Palestinian households have access to the internet in their homes and about a third have a computer.

In June 2020, the World Bank approved a US$15 million grant for the Technology for Youth and Jobs (TechStart) Project aiming to help the Palestinian IT sector upgrade the capabilities of firms and create more high-quality jobs. Kanthan Shankar, World Bank Country Director for West Bank and Gaza said "The IT sector has the potential to make a strong contribution to economic growth. It can offer opportunities to Palestinian youth, who constitute 30% of the population and suffer from acute unemployment."

=== Financial services ===
The Palestine Monetary Authority has issued guidelines for the operation and provision of electronic payment services including e-wallet and prepaid cards.

=== Impact of Israeli policies ===
The Gaza War and Israeli incursions in the West Bank during the Gaza war caused a severe economic contraction. In the West Bank, the gross domestic product (GDP) shrank by more than 17%, regressing to 2014 levels, with per capita GDP returning to 2008 levels. Gaza's economy collapsed with GDP contracting to one-eighth of its levels in 2022. The cumulative losses incurred as of 2024 were estimated by UNCTAD to be $170 billion, representing 17 times West Bank's 2024 GDP.

== Demographics ==
According to the Palestinian Central Bureau of Statistics (PCBS), as of 26 May 2021, the State of Palestine 2021 mid-year population is 5,227,193. Ola Awad, the president of the PCBS, estimated a population of 5.3 million at year end, 2021. Within an area of 6,020 square kilometers (2,320 mi^{2}), there is a population density of about 827 people per square kilometer. To put this in a wider context, the average population density of the world was 25 people per square kilometer in 2017.

=== Population ===
Largest cities or towns in Palestine (as of April 2024)
Rank		Governorate	Pop.
1	Gaza	Gaza Governorate	766,331
2	Jerusalem (Note: Jerusalem is disputed between Israel and Palestine, claimed as their capital by both. Palestine claims Jerusalem (specially East Jerusalem), including Haram al-Sharif as its capital. Jerusalem, including both East and West, have a population of 971,800 with 542,400 in East, which is recognized legally as part of Palestine)	Jerusalem Governorate	542,400
3	Hebron	Hebron Governorate	308,750
4	Nablus	Nablus Governorate	239,772
5	Khan Yunis	Khan Yunis Governorate	179,701
6	Jabalia	North Gaza Governorate	165,110
7	Rafah	Rafah Governorate	158,414
8	Jenin	Jenin Governorate	115,305
9	Ramallah	Ramallah and al-Bireh Governorate	104,173
10	Beit Lahia	North Gaza Governorate	86,526

Until the middle of the 20th century, the population of Palestine was mostly rural.

=== Ethnicity ===
Palestinians represent a highly homogenized community who share a cultural and ethnic identity, and close linguistic and cultural ties with other Levantine Arabs.

In 1919, Palestinian Muslims and Christians constituted 90 percent of the population of Palestine, just before the third wave of Jewish immigration and the setting up of British Mandatory Palestine after World War I. Opposition to Jewish immigration spurred the consolidation of a unified national identity, though Palestinian society was still fragmented by regional, class, religious, and family differences. The history of the Palestinian national identity is a disputed issue amongst scholars. For some, the term "Palestinian" is used to refer to the nationalist concept of a Palestinian people by Palestinian Arabs from the late 19th century and in the pre-World War I period, while others assert the Palestinian identity encompasses the heritage of all eras from pre-biblical times up to the Ottoman period. After the Israeli Declaration of Independence, the 1948 Palestinian expulsion, and more so after the 1967 Palestinian exodus, the term "Palestinian" evolved into a sense of a shared future in the form of aspirations for a Palestinian state. Though the concept of Palestinian citizenship for the purpose of international law has been revived, the in fieri realization of self-determination is still insufficient, thus Palestinians remain over the threshold of eligibility to receive international protection as refugees and stateless persons.

=== Language ===
Arabic is the official language of the State of Palestine, specifically the Palestinian Arabic dialect which is commonly spoken by the local population. Hebrew and English are also widely spoken. Around 16% of the population consists of Israeli settlers, whose primary language is typically Hebrew. Many Palestinians use Hebrew as a second or third language.

=== Religion ===
Religion of Palestinians (est. 2020)
1. Islam (99.0%)
2. Christianity (1.00%)

99% of Palestinians are Muslim, the vast majority of whom are followers of the Sunni branch of Islam, with a small minority of Ahmadiyya, and 15% being nondenominational Muslims. Palestinian Christians represent a significant minority of 1%, followed by much smaller religious communities, including Baháʼís and Samaritans.

=== Education ===
The literacy rate of Palestine was 96.3% according to a 2014 report by the United Nations Development Programme, which is high by international standards. There is a gender difference in the population aged above 15 with 5.9% of women considered illiterate compared to 1.6% of men. Illiteracy among women has fallen from 20.3% in 1997 to less than 6% in 2014.

=== Health ===
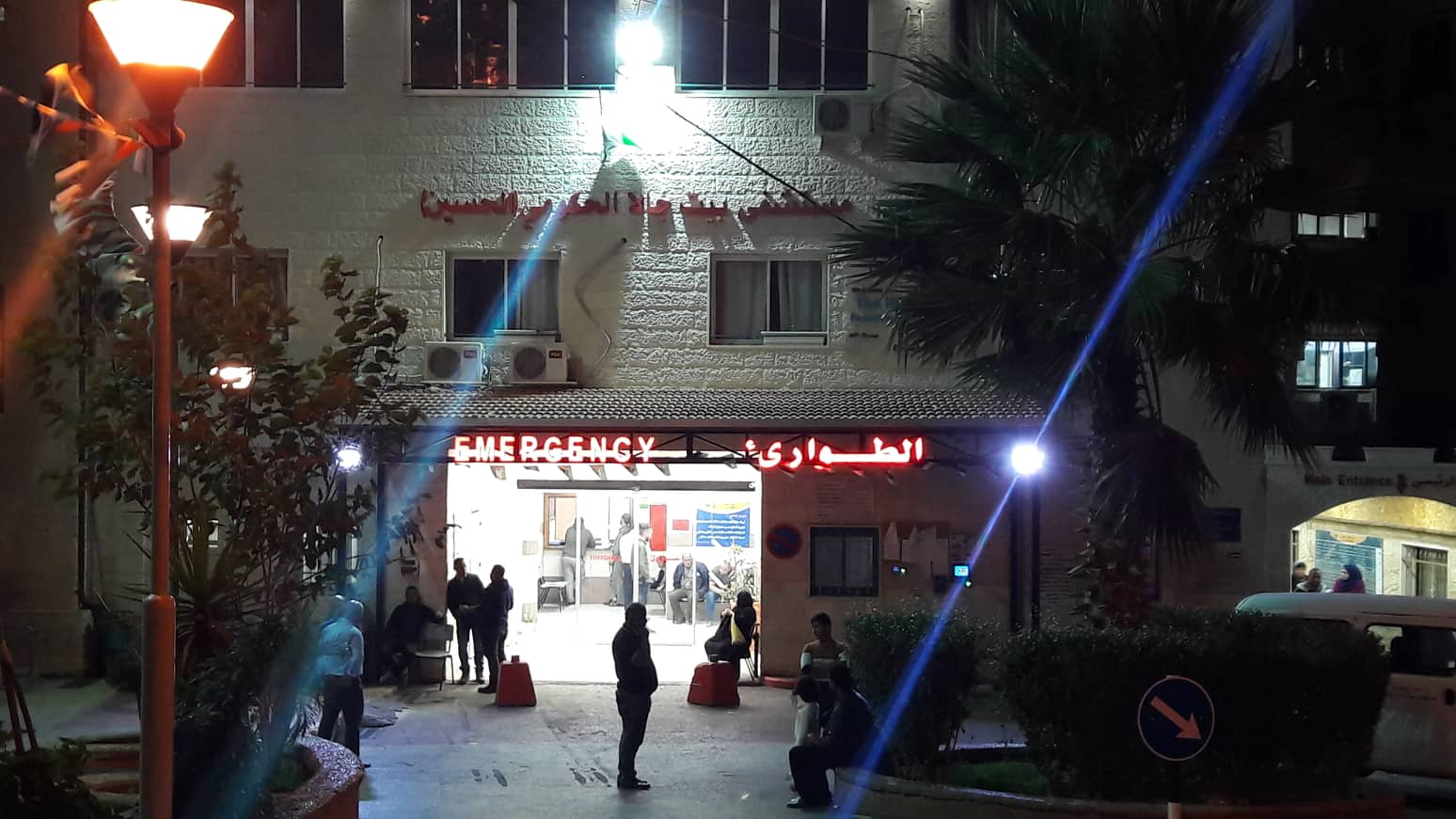
A hospital in Bethlehem.

According to the Palestinian Ministry of Health (MOH), as of 2017, there were 743 primary health care centers in Palestine (583 in the West Bank and 160 in Gaza), and 81 hospitals (51 in the West Bank, including East Jerusalem, and 30 in Gaza).

Operating under the auspices of the World Health Organization (WHO), the Health Cluster for the occupied Palestinian territory (oPt) was established in 2009 and represents a partnership of over 70 local and international nongovernmental organizations and UN agencies providing a framework for health actors involved in the humanitarian response for the oPt. The Cluster is co-chaired by the MOH to ensure alignment with national policies and plans. The report of WHO Director-General of 1 May 2019 describes health sector conditions in the oPt identifying strategic priorities and current obstacles to their achievement pursuant to the country cooperation strategy for WHO and the Occupied Palestinian Territory 2017–2020.

== Culture ==
The culture has influenced by the many diverse cultures and religions which have existed in the historical region of Palestine. The cultural and linguistic heritage of Palestinian Arabs along with Lebanese, Syrians, and Jordanians is integral part of Levantine Arab culture. Palestinians also have their own dialect of Arabic, the Palestinian dialect.

Cultural contributions to the fields of art, literature, music, costume and cuisine express the Palestinian identity despite the geographical separation between the Palestinians from the Palestinian territories, Palestinian citizens of Israel and Palestinians in the diaspora.

=== Architecture ===
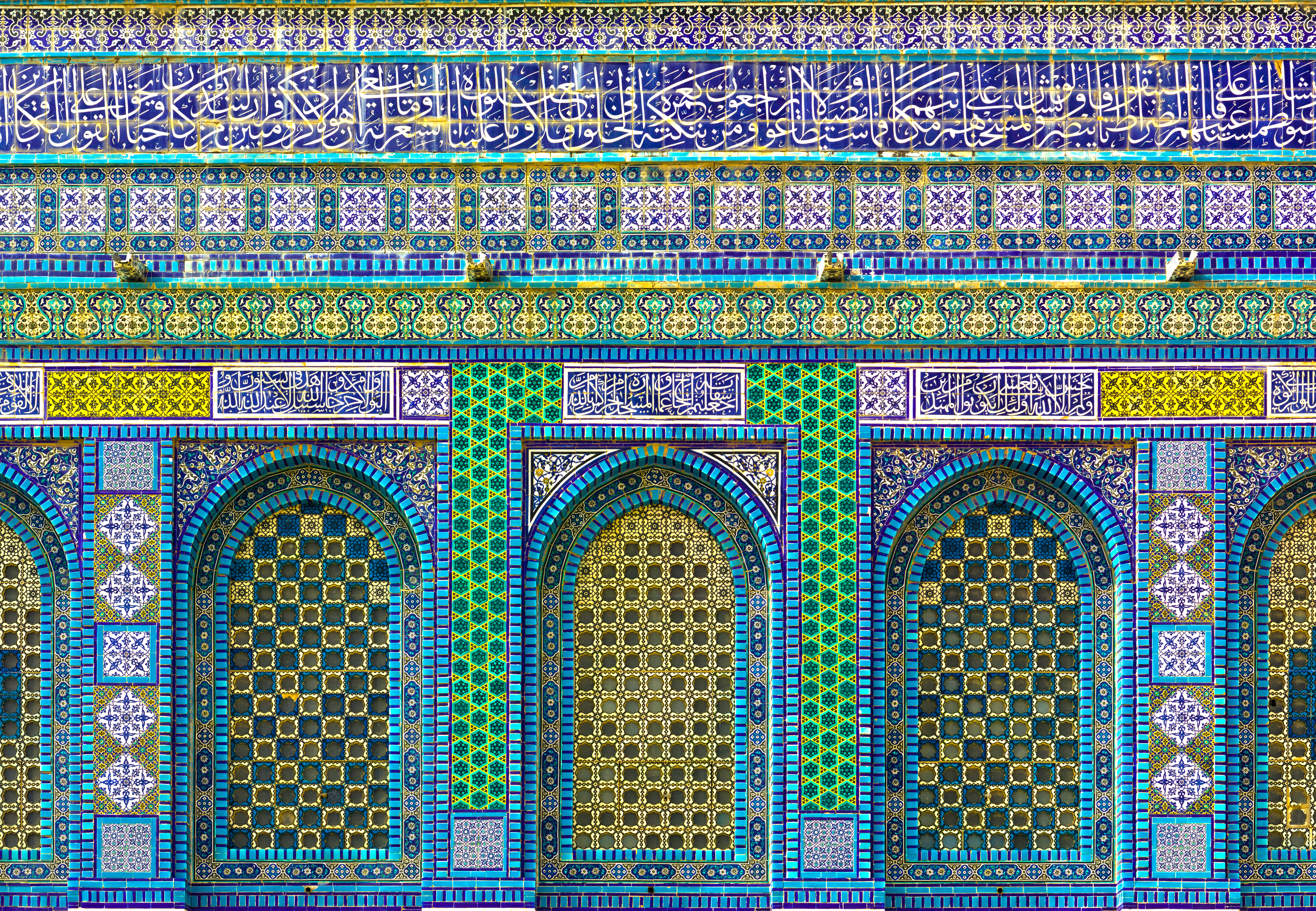
The Dome of the Rock in Jerusalem.

The architecture which covers a vast historical time frame and a number of different styles and influences over the ages. The urban architecture of the region of Palestine prior to 1850 was relatively sophisticated. While it belonged to greater geographical and cultural context of the Levant and the Arab world, it constituted a distinct tradition, "significantly different from the traditions of Syria, Jordan, Lebanon and Egypt." Nonetheless Palestinian townhouse shared in the same basic conceptions regarding the arrangement of living space and apartment types commonly seen throughout the Eastern Mediterranean. The rich diversity and underlying unity of the architectural culture of this wider region stretching from the Balkans to North Africa was a function of the exchange fostered by the caravans of the trade routes, and the extension of Ottoman rule over most of this area, beginning in the early 16th century through until the end of World War I.

=== Art, music, and clothing ===
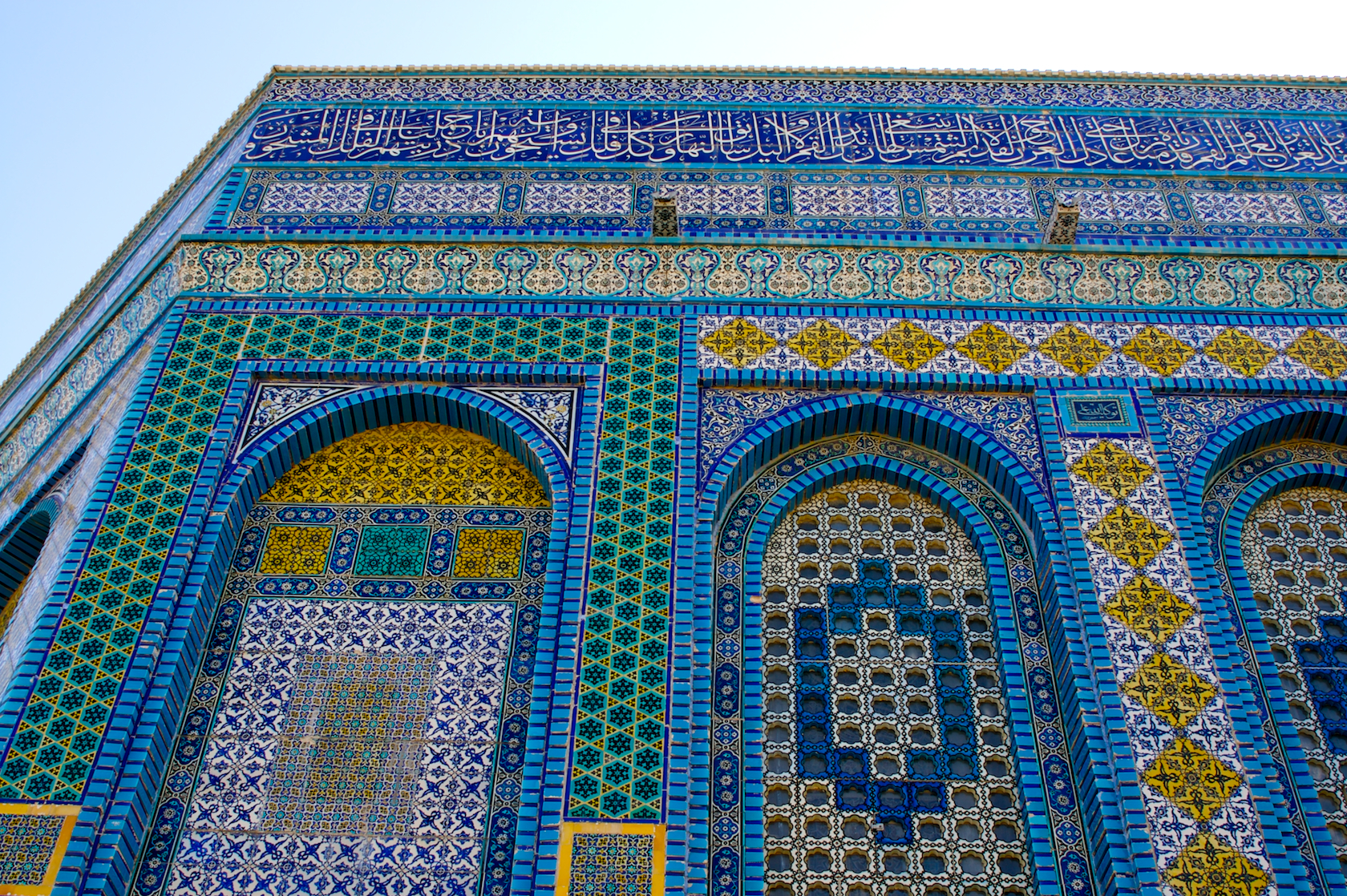
Dome of the Rock mosaic art

Palestinian art have been originating from historic Palestine, as well as paintings, posters, installation art, costumes, and handcrafts produced by Palestinian artists in modern and contemporary times.

Similar to the structure of Palestinian society, the Palestinian art field extends over four main geographic centers: the modern-day nation of Palestine (consisting of the West Bank and Gaza Strip), Israel, the Palestinian diaspora in the Arab world, and Europe and the United States.

Contemporary Palestinian art finds its roots in folk art and traditional Christian and Islamic painting popular in Palestine over the ages. After the Nakba of 1948, nationalistic themes have predominated as Palestinian artists use diverse media to express and explore their connection to identity and land.

The most popular recorded musicians at the time were in Arab classical music, especially Umm Kulthum and Sayed Darwish. The centers for Palestinian music were in the Palestinian towns of Nazareth and Haifa, where performers composed in the classical styles of Cairo and Damascus. A shared Palestinian identity was reflected in a new wave of performers who emerged with distinctively Palestinian themes, relating to the dreams of statehood and the burgeoning nationalist sentiment.

In the 1970s, a new wave of popular Palestinian stars emerged, including Sabreen, Mustafa Al-Kurd and Al Ashiqeen. After the First Intifada (1987), a more hard-edged group of performers and songwriters emerged, such as al- Funoun, Suhail Khoury, Jameel al-Sayih, Thaer Barghouti's Doleh song and Sabreen's Mawt a'nabi.

In the 1990s, the Palestinian National Authority was established, and Palestinian cultural expression began to stabilize. Other performers to emerge later in the included Yuad, Washem, Mohsen Subhi, Adel Salameh, Issa Boulos, Wissam Joubran, Samir Joubran, and Basel Zayed with his new sound of Palestine and Turab group founded in 2004 with the CD Hada Liel.

The Diaspora Palestinian Reem Kelani is one of the foremost present day researchers and performers of music with a specifically Palestinian narrative and heritage. Her 2006 debut solo album Sprinting Gazelle – Palestinian Songs from the Motherland and the Diaspora comprised Kelani's research and arrangement of five traditional Palestinian songs, whilst the other five songs were her own musical settings of popular and resistance poetry by the likes of Mahmoud Darwish, Salma Khadra Jayyusi, Rashid Husain and Mahmoud Salim al-Hout. All the songs on the album relate to pre-1948 Palestine.

Although the popular music was limited to the genre of folk music that served the needs of ritual and social events varied, but the beginnings of a serious musical phenomenon began to form in Palestine with the presence of profound composers of the first generation, such as Augustin Lama, Yousef Khasho, Salvador Arnita and others. The second generation of composers included among others, Patrick Lama, Amin Nasser, Nasri Fernando Dueri, and Saleem Zoughbi. The third generation includes younger musicians such as, Habib Hasan Touma, Mounir Anastas, Bichara El Khail and Sam Gebran.

At the same time, Palestinian classical music continued to develop, with the emergence of new composers and performers and the establishment of major institutions and ensembles. These include the Edward Said National Conservatory of Music, which supports the Palestinian Youth Orchestra; and the West–Eastern Divan Orchestra, founded by Daniel Barenboim and Edward Said. Alongside these, the growth of chamber ensembles, such as string quartets and quintets, gave the Palestinian Territories the highest number of orchestras among Arab countries.

Palestinian war songs prominently feature references to resistance against the occupation of Palestine, calling on Palestinians to fight the occupation and stay in their land, and describing historic events.

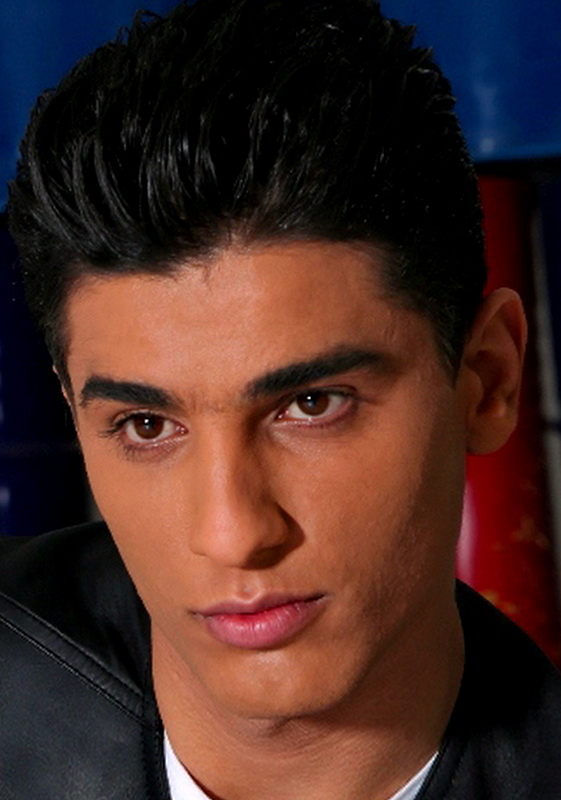
Mohammed Assaf is a Palestinian pop singer

The biggest moments in Palestinian music is Mohammad Assaf (born 1989) won the second season of the competition Arab Idol in 2013. With one of the biggest voter turn outs of all time, he earned support from Palestinians and the Arab world. He would go on to make huge records such as Ana Dammi Falastini (my blood is Palestinian), a national and international treasure. It was one of the highest selling Palestinian artists of all time.

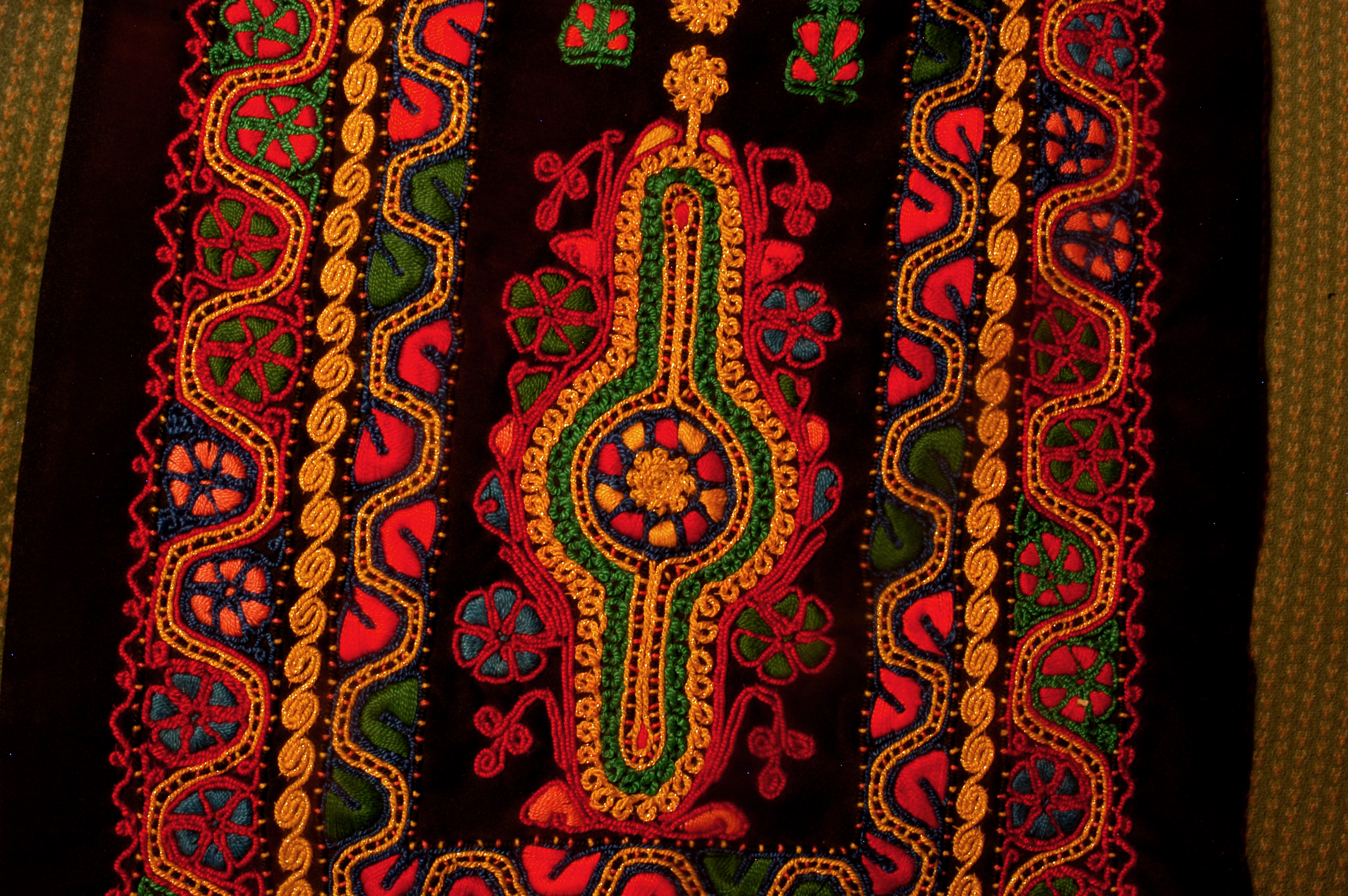
Modern couching stitch from Beit Jalla traditionally used on panels of malak wedding dress

The traditional clothing is historically and still presently worn by Palestinians in the 19th and early 20th centuries often have the rich variety of the costumes worn, particularly by the fellaheen or village women. Many of the handcrafted garments were richly embroidered and the creation and maintenance of these items played a significant role in the lives of the region's women.

In 1940s, traditional Palestinian clothing reflected a woman's economic and marital status and her town or district of origin, with knowledgeable observers discerning this information from the fabric, colours, cut, and embroidery motifs (or lack thereof) used in the apparel.

In 2021, The art of embroidery in Palestine, practices, skills, knowledge and rituals was inscribed on the UNESCO Representative List of the Intangible Cultural Heritage of Humanity.

=== Media ===
There are a number of newspapers, news agencies, and satellite television stations in Palestine. Its news agencies include Ma'an News Agency, Wafa, and Palestine News Network. Al-Aqsa TV, Al-Quds TV, and Sanabel TV are its main satellite broadcasters. Journalists critical of the government and freedom of speech have been repressed through violence.

=== Cinema ===
Palestinian cinema began in 1935 when Ibrahim Hassan Sirhan produced a twenty-minute film that chronicled Saudi Prince Saud's visit to Jerusalem and Jaffa. Four major periods that correspond to the main stages of the Palestinian national struggle are used by historians to trace the development of Palestinian filmmaking.

- The First Period (1935–1948): The early stages of Palestinian filmmaking before the 1948 war (Nakba) and the Palestinian people's mass exodus.
- The Second Period (1948–1967): Known as the "Epoch of Silence" this nearly two-decade period saw a near-complete cessation of domestic film production.
- The Third Period (1968–1982): Also referred to as the "Cinema of the Palestinian Revolution" or "Cinema of the Palestinian Organizations" it was produced in exile, mostly in Beirut, Lebanon, with support from the Palestine Liberation Organization (PLO) and other Palestinian institutions after the 1967 war.
- The Fourth Period (1980–present): Known as "Individualistic Cinema" or "Independent Cinema," it is defined by the individual efforts of filmmakers working independently in the homeland and diaspora without institutional support.

=== Sports ===
Association football (soccer) is the most popular sport in Palestine, with the Palestine national football team representing the state in international football and governed by FIFA worldwide.

== See also ==
- Outline of Palestine
