= Asad Abdul Rahman =

Palestinian political scientist and politician (born 1944)

- أسد عبد الرحمن
- Born: 1944 (age 81–82); Jerusalem, Mandatory Palestine
- Occupation: Academic
- Years active: 1960s–present
- Title: Professor

Academic background
- Education: American University of Beirut; University of Calgary
- Thesis: The Military Bureaucracy, Politics and Society in Egypt: The Era of Nasir (1973)

Academic work
- Discipline: Political science
- Institutions: Kuwait University

Asad Abdul Rahman (Arabic: أسد عبد الرحمن; born 1944) is a Palestinian political scientist, academic and politician who was a long-term member of the executive committee of the Palestine Liberation Organization (PLO) and the Palestinian National Council.

== Early life and education ==
Abdul Rahman was born in Jerusalem, Mandatory Palestine, in 1944. He obtained a degree in public administration from the American University of Beirut in 1965. He was a member of the General Union of Palestinian Students during his university studies. His political career began in Beirut when he joined the Arab Nationalist Movement.

Abdul Rahman completed his Ph.D. studies in 1973 and obtained a Ph.D. degree from University of Calgary, Canada. His thesis is entitled Military bureaucracy, politics and society in Egypt: The era of Nasir.

== Career ==
Abdul Rahman is one of the founders of the Popular Front for the Liberation of Palestine (PFLP). He was made a member of the Palestinian National Council in 1969. He worked as a researcher at the Palestine Research Center in Beirut between 1966 and 1967 and then, headed its research section between 1968 and 1970. After his Ph.D. studies he continued to work at the center as a research consultant from 1973 to 1974. He joined Kuwait University as an assistant professor in political science in 1974 becoming a full professor in 1984.

Abdul Rahman later left the PFLP and became an independent member of the PLO's executive committee. He was in charge of refugee affairs and also, headed the Palestine Authority's Higher Council for Refugee Camps until his resignation in July 2000. His tenure at the executive committee ended in May 2018.

Abdul Rahman published several studies on the Israeli–Palestinian conflict. His articles on the topic were also featured in the Pakistani newspaper The Nation. He was one of the participants of the United Nations's first seminar on the question of Palestine which was held in Arusha, Tanzania, between 14 July and 18 July 1980. At the conference Rashid Hamid and he presented a paper entitled "The Palestine Liberation Organization: Past, Present and Future".

Abdul Rahman lives in Jordan and serves as the executive director of the Palestine International Institute.
