= Palestinian legislature =

Palestinian legislature may refer to:

- Palestinian Legislative Council of the Palestinian National Authority
- Palestinian National Council of the Palestine Liberation Organization
