= Television in Palestine =

Television arrived late to Palestine, only appearing in the early 90s. The first TV station was Salam TV, which started broadcasting in 1991. The PA received authority over its areas of governance following ratification of the Oslo I Accord agreement. Examples of channels include Al-Aqsa TV, Palestinian Broadcasting Corporation, Al-Qasid TV, Palestinian Satellite Channel, formerly Sanabel TV, Al Naqah, Al Madina, Falastini TV, Musawa, Palestine Edu, Palestine Mubasher, Palestine Today, and Al-Quds TV.

In the early 2000s, in addition to the PBC network, there were 31 private television stations available in the West Bank.

There are several terrestrial and satellite TV stations. The latter broadcast from either Palestine itself or from abroad. Dozens of terrestrial television stations were licensed as of January 2020. Most of them, a total of eight, were based in Nablus Governorate.

== History ==
Television started in Nablus in 1991 with the launch of Salam TV, though other sources claim it started broadcasting in 1993. This coincided with the Oslo Accords. 1994 saw the rapid emergence of television stations, both in the West Bank and in the Gaza Strip. The government, represented by the Palestinian Authority, started broadcasting Palestine TV and the Palestinian Satellite Channel in 1995. The PA budget for television was low, especially since PBC launched at a time when pan-Arabian satellite television channels were operational. However, since the country was politically and socially polarized, a number of Palestinian satellite channels emerged, catering different factions and demographics.

Before the introduction of national television in 1992, the lack of television meant limited chances for filmmakers to screen their productions to the public. That year, Al-Quds Television (based in East Jerusalem) made Palestine's first television export, Palestinian Diaries, in cooperation with Channel 4, New York-based Tamouz Media and IKON. In 1993, a German team trained a group of Palestinian journalists hoping to introduce television journalism into the country, using the facilities of the soon-to-be defunct Al Fajr newspaper, with a US$125,000 donation from the German Green Party. However, the German delegation trained a team of civil servants who were aiming to open an officialist channel akin to what the PBC would become. The Israeli Broadcasting Authority convened in a plenum on 16 June 1993 that a planned Palestinian television station managed by Faisal Husseini would bring a death knell to its Arabic programming, which was seen on Channel 1. A "prototype" half-hour news bulletin with Swedish funds aired on 19 July 1993, though, in order to obtain a license, it would obtain an Israeli one. The bulletin was compared by locals to the ones on JRTV and the Arabic service of the IBA.

Palestinian TV began in earnest in 1994 with the opening of the Palestinian Broadcasting Corporation on 1 July. The new network broadcast from 4pm to 8pm every day, from Jericho. The new channel broadcast from the Hisham Palace Hotel. Programming was controlled by the Palestinian Authority, which also filtered content. This caused criticism from locals as they thought it to be a tool in favor of Yasser Arafat. By early 1995, reports from Palestinian television were included in an early Jewish website, Israel.mideast. Another new station was authorized in December 1994 when the Palestinian Authority took over Gaza and Jericho, but was still pending a launching decision in May 1995. A television station in Gaza (presumably associated with PBC) started test broadcasts in September 1994 with still photographs of Arafat; by June 1995, the station operated on a shoestring budget of US$20,000 a month and pirated most of its programming. The station censored content, but on sexual and not political grounds due to it being a conservative society.
