= Executive Committee of the Palestine Liberation Organization =

Government of the State of Palestine

Executive Committee of the Palestine Liberation Organization اللجنة التنفيذية لمنظمة التحرير الفلسطينية
- Chairman: Mahmoud Abbas
- Membership: 16 members
- Parent organization: Palestinian National Council

The Executive Committee of the Palestine Liberation Organization (PLO EC; Arabic: اللجنة التنفيذية لمنظمة التحرير الفلسطينية, romanized: al-Lajnah al-Tanfīdhīyah li-Munaẓẓamat al-Taḥrīr al-Filasṭīnīyah) is the highest executive body of the Palestine Liberation Organization (PLO), and acts as the government of the State of Palestine.

The EC represents the organization internationally. It represents the Palestinian people, supervises the various PLO bodies, executes the policies and decisions set of the Palestinian National Council (PNC) and the Palestinian Central Council, and handles the PLO’s financial issues. The EC meets in Palestine or abroad. The head of the EC (executive committee) is the Chairman of the PLO Executive Committee (sometimes called President), elected by the PNC. Mahmoud Abbas has been the chairman since the death of Yasser Arafat in November 2004.

Executive committee members hold special areas of responsibility, such as military matters, foreign affairs, finance and social affairs, making their role similar to that of ministers in a national government. Besides other functions, the executive committee is involved in the nomination of candidates for the PNC, and when elections to the PNC are not feasible, the executive committee may appoint PNC members.

== Organization ==
Ahmad Al-Shuqeiry was the first Chairman of the PLO Executive Committee elected by the Palestinian National Council in 1964, and was succeeded in 1967 by Yahya Hammuda. In February 1969, Yasser Arafat was appointed leader of the PLO. He continued to be PLO leader (sometimes called chairman, sometimes president) until his death in November 2004. The EC appointed Mahmoud Abbas chairman within hours of Arafat's death.

The quorum for legitimate decisions is 12 of the 18 members, according to the Palestinian National Covenant, the constitution of the PLO.

== Members ==
The executive committee currently has 16 members, elected by the Palestinian National Council, often as representatives of the PLO member factions. The head of the EC is the chairman, who since 2004 has been Mahmoud Abbas.

On 27 August 2009, the PNC elected six new members to the EC to replace members who had died (including Yasser Arafat) since the last plenary PNC meeting in 1996. The vote took place in an extraordinary meeting, due to lack of the requisite PNC quorum. Among the six elected were Ahmed Qurei and Hanan Ashrawi. Some Palestinian factions, including Hamas and Islamic Jihad, boycotted the PNC meeting. They called the PLO illegal and illegitimate, because they and other Palestinian factions were not represented in the organization, and was a violation of the Cairo and Mecca agreements and the National Conciliation Document, which envisioned simultaneous elections for the Palestinian National Council and the Palestinian Authority.

On 24 August 2015, Abbas said that he had resigned from the PLO’s executive committee along with ten other members, though their resignations were subject to approval by the Palestinian National Council. The executive committee members who announced their resignation were to continue to hold their positions until the PNC meeting in April 2018. One of them was Asad Abdul Rahman.

=== Current members ===
The current members of the Executive Committee as of 7 November 2023 are:

1. Mahmoud Abbas (Fatah) (Chairman)
2. Hussein al-Sheikh (Fatah) (Deputy Chairman)
3. Azzam al-Ahmad (Fatah) (Secretary-General)
4. Ziad Abu Amr (independent)
5. Faisal Aranaki (Arab Liberation Front)
6. Ahmad Abu Houli (independent)
7. Adnan al-Husayni (independent)
8. Ramzi Khoury (Fatah)
9. Ahmed Majdalani (Popular Struggle Front)
10. Mohammad Mustafa (independent)
11. Ramzi Rabah (Democratic Front for the Liberation of Palestine)
12. Saleh Ra'fat (Palestinian Democratic Union)
13. Bassam al-Salhi (Palestinian People’s Party)
14. Ahmad Bayyoud Tamimi (independent)
15. Wasel Abu Yousef (Palestinian Liberation Front)
16. Ali Abu Zuhri (independent)
