= Palestinian Declaration of Independence =

1988 statement that formally established the State of Palestine

- Date effective: 15 November 1988
- Author: Mahmoud Darwish

The Palestinian Declaration of Independence formally established the State of Palestine, and was written by Palestinian poet Mahmoud Darwish and proclaimed by Yasser Arafat on 15 November 1988 (5 Rabiʽ al-Thani 1409) in Algiers, Algeria. It had previously been adopted by the Palestinian National Council (PNC), the legislative body of the Palestine Liberation Organization (PLO), by a vote of 253 in favour, 46 against, and 10 abstaining. It was read at the closing session of the 19th PNC to a standing ovation. Upon completing the reading of the declaration, Arafat, as chairman of the PLO, assumed the title of President of Palestine. In April 1989, the PLO Central Council elected Arafat as the first president of the State of Palestine.

== Background ==
On 28 October 1974, the 1974 Arab League summit held in Rabat designated the PLO as the "sole legitimate representative of the Palestinian people and reaffirmed their right to establish an independent state of urgency." Legal justification for the declaration was based on United Nations General Assembly Resolution 181 (II) of 29 November 1947, which provided for the termination and partition of the British Mandate into two states. On 14 May 1948, the British mandate ended, the State of Israel was declared and the Arab Legion of Transjordan (later Jordan) invaded the West Bank (only to annex it in 1950). In September 1948 Egyptian forces captured the Gaza strip and kept it under military rule. Until the Six-Day War in June 1967 these two territories remained under Jordanian and Egyptian rule.

Despite the 1988 proclamation of the State of Palestine, at the time the Palestine Liberation Organization did not exercise control over any territory, and designated Jerusalem as the capital of Palestine,^{[i]} which was under Israeli control and claimed by it as Israel's capital. The PLO was hence a government in exile between 1988 and 1994. The PLO began to exercise a limited rule in the Areas A and B of the West Bank and part of the Gaza Strip as a consequence of the 1994 Gaza-Jericho Agreement, under the umbrella of the Palestinian National Authority. In 2012, Palestine was upgraded to the status of non-member observer state in the UN.

== Significance ==
Boundaries defined in the 1947 UN Partition Plan for Palestine: Area assigned for a Jewish state Area assigned for an Arab state Planned Corpus separatum with the intention that Jerusalem would be neither Jewish nor Arab Armistice Demarcation Lines of 1949 (Green Line): Israel per 1949 armistice lines West Jerusalem and other areas under Israeli control from 1949 Gaza and the West Bank (including East Jerusalem) under Egyptian and Jordanian control till 1967

The declaration concerned the Palestine region, as defined by the borders of the British Mandate of Palestine, which includes the whole of the State of Israel as well as the West Bank and the Gaza Strip (at the time part of the Israeli Civil Administration). It references the United Nations Partition Plan for Palestine of 1947 and "UN resolutions since 1947" in general as providing legitimacy to Palestinian statehood.

The Partition Plan served as the basis for the Israeli Declaration of Independence, but was not accepted by the Palestinian Arab leadership at the time. In September 1948, the All-Palestine Government was declared within the Gaza Strip as an Egyptian protectorate and recognized by most members of the Arab League, which is regarded by some as the first attempt to establish an independent Palestinian state; however, All-Palestine had been dissolved by Egypt several years later. The 1988 declaration does not explicitly recognize the State of Israel. However, an accompanying document, which explicitly mentions UN Security Council Resolution 242, and Yasser Arafat's statements in Geneva a month later, were accepted by the United States as sufficient to interpret the declaration as recognising Israel in its pre-1967 boundaries.

The declaration's reference to Palestine being the "land of the three monotheistic faiths" has been held as recognising the Jewish historical connection to the land. Referring to "the historical injustice inflicted on the Palestinian Arab people resulting in their dispersion and depriving them of their right to self-determination", the declaration recalled the Treaty of Lausanne (1923) and UN General Assembly Resolution 181 as supporting the rights of Palestinians to statehood. The declaration then proclaims a "State of Palestine on our Palestinian territory with its capital Jerusalem". The borders of the state are proclaimed on its Palestinian territory. The population of the state was referred to by the statement: "The State of Palestine is the state of Palestinians wherever they may be". The state was defined as an Arab country by the statement: "The State of Palestine is an Arab state, an integral and indivisible part of the Arab nation".

== Immediate responses in the occupied territories and Israel ==
Over the weekend of 11–12 November 1988, the Israeli military sealed off the occupied Palestinian territories in anticipation of the PNC meeting, with the goal of preventing any disturbances. The number of soldiers deployed to the territories was significantly increased, while telephone and power lines in the territories were severed, roadblocks erected to prevent Palestinians residents travelling between zones in the territories, loudspeakers in mosques were removed, Palestinian flags were torn down, and residents of towns were forced by soldiers to clean nationalist graffiti. The military also imposed a curfew on the territories, confining all Palestinian residents to their homes around-the-clock, while barring access to journalists unless accompanied by IDF officers, and forbidding the Israel Broadcasting Authority from televising any footage of the PNC convention. Israeli patrols to enforce the curfew used megaphones to warn Palestinians that leaving their homes meant that they could be shot. As well, the military carried out preventative arrests of several hundred Palestinians. Israeli Minister of Defence Yitzhak Rabin warned that the military was "prepared to use maximum force to put down any demonstrations following any pronouncement in Algiers."

The declaration of independence was met with near-unanimous condemnation in Israel, including among both right-wing and centre-left politicians. Prime Minister and Likud leader Yitzhak Shamir described it as "an additional step in the war of Arab terrorist organizations against the existence and independence of the state of Israel", pledging to "continue, as long as is necessary, to convince all the nations of the world that conferring recognition abets this creature, meaning assistance in the elimination of the state of Israel." Yossi Ben Aharon, director general of the Prime Minister's Office, described the declaration as " an exercise in disinformation whose purpose is to create the impression of moderation." Minister of Foreign Affairs and Israeli Labor Party leader Shimon Peres accused the PLO of attempting to "substitute ambiguity for clear decisions", saying that it "further complicated efforts" for peace. The Israeli Ministry of Foreign Affairs released an official statement accusing the PLO of being "unable or unwilling to recognize reality", saying that "any recognition or legitimization of the declaration will not be conducive to peace in the Middle East", and ordered Israeli diplomats to intensively lobby governments and news organisations in the countries in which they were stationed to not recognise the declaration.

Minister of Industry and Trade Ariel Sharon described the decalaration as "a very dangerous development", and called for Israel to annex parts of the West Bank as a response. MK Benjamin Netanyahu, who recently completed his term as Permanent Representative of Israel to the United Nations, described the declaration as "a mere public relations gimmick devoid of value." Chief of the General Staff Dan Shomron warned Palestinians that "after a year in which they have been paying the full price, all they can get from the PNC overseas is appeals to the heart, festive declarations and nothing beyond it." Central Command head Amram Mitzna stated that "the declaration is disant from the territories, and from reality... Residents of the territories have very quickly realized that it is the State of Israel that governs here, through the security forces, and that no meaning can be given to this declaration. We are the ones who determine what will happen."

Due to the curfew imposed on the territories by the Israeli military, public celebrations of the declaration were limited among Palestinian residents, however, the declaration was largely received positively. According to The New York Times, "despite the warnings, Palestinians in Gaza took to the streets as soon as the patrols disappeared. They banged on drums, clapped, sang and set off fireworks in celebration. When the army returned, the revelers fled." According to Time Magazine, "shopkeepers in Arab East Jerusalem passed out chocolates and local residents exchanged greetings of “Mabrouk” (congratulations)." Journalist Joel Greenberg described how some Palestinians circumvented the imposed power cuts and "hooked up their television sets to car batteries and held 'independence parties' with their neighbors", and a celebration held by the staff of the Al-Ittihad Hospital in Nablus: "employees at the Ittihad Nisai Hospital in Nablus blared the Palestinian anthem Biladi (My Country) over a tape recorder and sang nationalist songs. Masked youths flew balloons bearing the colors of the Palestinian flag from the roof of the building while a youth carried a Palestinian flag, to the applause of the crowd. The impromptu ceremony brought cheers and whistles from adjacent homes, whose occupants stepped outside in violation of the curfew. Soldiers arrived at the hospital and broke up the celebration." Prominent Palestinian newspaper editor Hanna Siniora stated that he felt "the same joy I experienced at the birth of my first child", describing the declaration as "a triumph for the voice of moderation within the Palestinian camp." Prominent Palestinian scholar Sari Nusseibeh described it as "a memorable day in our history" that he hoped would "establish peace in the region." Birzeit University president Hanna Nasser stated that "this may not lead us to actual independence, but it’s the first step in that direction... Now, the Palestinians in the West Bank have a more defined aim and, more importantly, the Palestinians both inside and outside the occupied territories will be in agreement over these aims."

The Unified National Leadership of the Uprising, the coalition (formed of the Palestinian Communist Party, the DFLP, the PFLP, and Fatah) directing the First Intifada, applauded the declaration, describing it as "not a concession with nothing in return, as some believe, but rather a realistic, revolutionary and responsible declaration which puts an end to the Zionist lies about the aims of our triumphant revolution." Salim Tamari of the Institute for Palestine Studies has argued that the "main achievement of the UNLU in its first year is that it imposed its own perceptions and initiatives of the mass movement on the external leadership of the PLO", with the declaration of independence representing the peak of the UNLU's influence in its relationship with the PLO leadership in exile, with the PLO leadership subsequently exerting greater and greater influence over the UNLU as the Intifada continued. Scott Macleod of Time Magazine wrote that "certainly the actions represented a victory for Palestinian moderates."

The only notable Palestinian factions to completely oppose the declaration was the recently founded, anti-UNLU, conservative Islamist group Hamas, who condemned it as a surrender and "imaginary. It is a quick move by some of the Palestinian ranks to steal the fruits of the intifadeh’s victory." George Habash, leader of the far-left Popular Front for the Liberation of Palestine (PFLP), had opposed the Declaration during the PNC's deliberations, but afterwards accepted it to maintain the unity of the PLO. The blanket curfew was lifted by the Israeli military over the weekend of 18-19 November. In the weeks following the declaration, even as no widespread disturbances by Palestinians broke out, the Israeli military continued to escalate operations against the First Intifada, including pre-emptive raids and selective curfews on Palestinian villages, with the aim of "forestalling disturbances" and to "deflate nationalist elements."

== Consequences ==
The declaration was accompanied by a PNC call for multilateral negotiations on the basis of UN Security Council Resolution 242. This call was later termed "the Historic Compromise", as it implied acceptance of the "two-state solution", namely that it no longer questioned the legitimacy of the State of Israel. The PNC's political communiqué accompanying the declaration called only for withdrawal from "Arab Jerusalem" and the other "Arab territories occupied." Yasser Arafat's statements in Geneva a month later were accepted by the United States as sufficient to remove the ambiguities it saw in the declaration and to fulfill the longheld conditions for open dialogue with the United States.

As a result of the declaration, the United Nations General Assembly (UNGA) convened, inviting Yasser Arafat, Chairman of the PLO, to give an address. United Nations General Assembly Resolution 43/177 was adopted "acknowledging the proclamation of the State of Palestine by the Palestine National Council on 15 November 1988", and it was further decided that "the designation 'Palestine' should be used in place of the designation 'Palestine Liberation Organization' in the United Nations system." One hundred and four states voted for this resolution, forty-four abstained, and two – the United States and Israel – voted against. By mid-December, 75 states had recognised Palestine, rising to 93 states by February 1989.

On 29 November 2012, the United Nations General Assembly adopted resolution 67/19 upgrading Palestine to non-member observer state status in the United Nations. It was adopted by the sixty-seventh session of the United Nations General Assembly on the date of the International Day of Solidarity with the Palestinian People and the 65th anniversary of the adoption by the General Assembly of resolution 181(II) on the Future Government of Palestine. The draft resolution was proposed by Palestine's representative at the United Nations. It, however, maintains the status of the Palestine Liberation Organization as the representative of the Palestinian people within the United Nations system. On 31 December 2014, the United Nations Security Council voted down a resolution demanding the end of Israeli occupation and Palestinian statehood by 2017. Eight members voted for the Resolution (Russia, China, France, Argentina, Chad, Chile, Jordan, Luxembourg). However, the resolution did not get the minimum of nine votes needed to pass the resolution. Australia and the United States voted against the resolution, with the United Kingdom, Lithuania, Nigeria, South Korea and Rwanda abstaining.

In 2020, UN special rapporteur Francesca Albanese characterized the question of Palestinians' enduring statelessness as "particularly fraught" due to both the survival of the use of the concept of nationality as common identity and communal bond in the Palestinian context in particular, as it pertains to their exile and subsequent diaspora, and the confusion caused by less-than-full reinstatement of the concept of Palestinian citizenship, with the "significant exception" of those still with Jordanian conferred citizenship (who remained in Jordan after King Hussein ceded the West Bank in 1988). She characterized the de facto existence it may have as still being insufficient for the purpose of international law: "[S]ome of the functions that give purpose to ... "the 'legal bond' that makes a person citizen of a state ... exist" means "de facto citizenship may having a meaning in the perimeters of the State of Palestine's jurisdiction", e.g. the first Palestinian election held, being revived based on the in fieri realization of Palestinian self-determination. Albanese classified "important milestones" towards breaking the conditions of Article 1 of the Convention Relating to the Status of Stateless Persons which evaluates "statelessness" in opposition to being "considered 'citizens' of any state under the operation of its law", such as the "exercise [of] limited state functions" as a result of the Oslo Accords, and accordingly the PNC's declaration of independence in 1988. However, it would be "premature" to argue that which requires a fully sovereign state, consisting of examples given of granting entry of persons to the country and the realization of most of the fundamental rights and freedoms, in accordance with its law, thus Palestinians remained over the threshold of eligibility to receive international protection as refugees and stateless persons. This argument was in response to one from Palestinian professor Mazin Qumsiyeh who, in commissioning the Draft Palestinian Nationality Law for the PLO in 2011, endorsed the status of de facto citizenship of the State of Palestine, inferring that the question of citizenship is based on the one of self-determination, although calling it merely "not comparable" to the status of citizens of fully sovereign states. Albanese considered her reasoning as explaining the lack of the law's adoption.

== See also ==
- All-Palestine Government
- 1948 Palestinian Declaration of Independence
- Jordanian annexation of the West Bank
- Occupation of the Gaza Strip by the United Arab Republic
- International recognition of the State of Palestine
- Palestinian nationalism

== Footnotes ==
i.	The Palestine Basic Law, approved by the PLC in May 2002, states unambiguously "Jerusalem is the Capital of Palestine" (source: ). Ramallah is the administrative capital where government institutions and foreign representative offices of Australia, Brazil, Canada Colombia, Czech Republic, Denmark, Finland, Germany, Malta, the Netherlands, South Africa, and Switzerland are located. Jerusalem's final status awaits future negotiations between Israel and the Palestinian Authority (see "Negotiating Jerusalem", University of Maryland). The United Nations and most countries do not accept Israel's claim over the whole of Jerusalem (see Kellerman 1993, p. 140) and maintain their embassies to Israel in other cities (see the CIA Factbook).

== Bibliography ==
- Kellerman, Aharon (1993). Society and Settlement: Jewish Land of Israel in the Twentieth Century. State University of New York Press. ISBN 0-7914-1295-4.
