= Sanabel TV =

Sanabel TV was a West Bank television station.

According to the CBC Radio show As It Happens:

"Sanabel TV is the most popular locally-operated television station in the West Bank city of Nablus. In fact, it is the only locally-run TV station in Nablus. And Israeli forces have shut it down."

A private operation, as of 2001, it reportedly had a staff of seven employees, being one of the nine television stations available in the city. It employed the VHS system for recording and transmission and broadcast on UHF channel 33.

It was shut down in late February 2007 after the Israeli Defence Forces raided Nablus. Its managing director, Nabegh Break, was detained.
