= Palestinian National Council =

Legislative body of the Palestine Liberation Organization

Palestinian National Council المجلس الوطني الفلسطيني

Type
- Type: Legislative body of the Palestine Liberation Organization

History
- Founded: 1964; 62 years ago

Leadership
- Chairman: Rawhi Fattouh
- Vice Chairpersons: Ali Faisal; Mousa Hadid
- Secretary-General: Fahmi al-Za’arir

Structure
- Seats: 747

Meeting place
- Ramallah

Website
- www.palestinepnc.org

The Palestinian National Council (PNC; Arabic: المجلس الوطني الفلسطيني, romanized: Al-majlis Al-wataniu Al-filastiniu) is the legislative body - in Arabic, the Majlis - of the Palestine Liberation Organization (PLO). The PNC is intended to serve as the parliament that represents all Palestinians inside and outside the Palestinian territories, and all sectors of the worldwide Palestinian community, including political parties, popular organizations, resistance movements, and independent figures from all sectors of life.

The Council met formally 20 times in the 27 years between 1964 and 1991. Since the Oslo Accords, the council met formally only twice: in 1996 and 2018.

The PNC is intended to be responsible for formulating the policies and programs for the PLO, and elects the PLO Executive Committee, which assumes leadership of the organization between its sessions. Resolutions are passed by a simple majority with a quorum of two-thirds. The PNC elects its own Chairman.

== Representation ==
Although Article 5 of the PLO Basic Law, adopted at the first PNC meeting in 1964, states that members should be chosen by "direct election... by the Palestinian people", such elections have never happened. Since the PNC and PLO were created originally by the Arab League, the initial membership of the PNC was chosen by the Arab states, particularly Jordan and Egypt. Even Palestinian factions were wary of direct elections, worrying about the ability for outside actors to influence such elections and thus undermine the emerging Palestinian resistance. On the other hand, the Palestinian factions were conscious of the value of having a Palestinian institution recognized by the Arab world.

After the Six Day War in 1967, the PNC was reconstituted. From 1968 onwards, PNC membership was reallocated based on a quota system, allocating seats to Palestinian political parties and resistance groups based on the claimed size of their membership. This mechanism was used, and continues to be used, by Fatah to ensure its monopoly over the Executive Committee, the decision-making body of the PLO.

== Structure ==
The PNC serves as the legislative body of the PLO. While the PNC has a number of PLC members, it is not an organ of the Palestinian National Authority. Rather it is the equivalent of PA's PLC. According to its charter, the PNC must meet annually, and can hold special meetings if necessary. The PNC is responsible for formulating PLO's policies, and elects the PLO Executive Committee.

Candidates for the PNC are nominated by a committee consisting of the PLO Executive Committee, the PNC chairman, and the commander in chief of the Palestine Liberation Army. After nomination, PNC candidates are elected by a majority of the entire PNC membership. However, due to the impossibility of holding elections, PNC elections have never been held and most members are appointed by the executive committee.

The Palestinian Central Council (PCC) serves as the intermediary body between the PNC and the EC. The PCC is chaired by the PNC chairman, and has increasingly eclipsed the PNC as the main decision-making body of the PLO. In 2018, the PNC transferred its legislative powers to the PCC, including powers to elect the EC.

Though not members of PLO, Hamas and Palestinian Islamic Jihad members were invited to the PNC as observers in 2018, although they refused.

As of 2012 the main office of the PNC is in Amman and a branch office is located in Ramallah.

== Meetings ==
The first PNC, composed of 422 representatives, met in Jerusalem in May 1964 and adopted the Palestinian National Covenant (also called Palestinian National Charter). It also established the PLO as the political expression of the Palestinian people and elected Ahmad Al-Shuqeiry as the first chairman of the PLO Executive Committee. At the conference were representatives from Palestinian communities in Jordan, West Bank, the Gaza Strip, Syria, Lebanon, Kuwait, Iraq, Egypt, Qatar, Libya, and Algeria.

Subsequent sessions were held in Cairo (1965), Gaza (1966), Cairo (1968–1977), Damascus (1979–1981), Algiers (1983), Amman (1984), Algiers (1988), Gaza (1996 and 1998), Ramallah (2009).

At the February 1969 meeting in Cairo, Yasser Arafat was appointed leader of the PLO. He continued to be PLO leader (sometimes called Chairman, sometimes President) until his death in 2004.

In a November 1988 meeting in Algiers, the PNC approved the Palestinian Declaration of Independence by a vote of 253 in favour 46 against and 10 abstentions.

After the signing of the Oslo Accords in 1993, the PNC met in Gaza in April 1996 and voted 504 to 54 to void those parts of the Palestinian National Covenant that denied Israel's right to exist, but the charter itself has not been formally changed or re-drafted. One of its most prominent members, the Palestinian-American scholar and activist Edward Said, left the PNC because he believed that the Oslo Accords sold short the right of Palestinian refugees to return to their homes in pre-1967 Israel and would not lead to a lasting peace.

In December 1998, the PNC met in Gaza at the insistence of the Israeli Prime Minister Benjamin Netanyahu, who called it a condition of the continuation of the peace process. In the presence of the US President Clinton, it reaffirmed again the annulling of the parts of the Covenant which denied Israel's right to exist, but it still did not formally change or re-draft the Covenant. Clinton gave a speech to the event appealing to the PNC not to allow their grievances against Israel to stifle Palestinian progress.

In 1996, when the Council had to vote on the revision of the Palestinian National Charter, the total number of PNC members was increased from 400 to about 800. By 2009, some 700 from them had remained. As of 2003, the PNC chairman was Salim Zanoun and the PNC had 669 members; 88 are from the first Palestinian Legislative Council (PLC), 98 represent the Palestinian population living in the West Bank and Gaza Strip, and 483 represent the Palestinian diaspora.

For the first time in 22 years, since its last full meeting in 1996, the 700 member PNC met on 30 April 2018 in Ramallah to discuss recent developments, but many groups did not attend, including Hamas (the leading Palestinian political party), Islamic Jihad and Popular Front for the Liberation of Palestine. The PNC also filled vacancies in the PLO Executive Committee with loyalists to Palestinian president Mahmood Abbas.

The PNC have met formally 23 times since inception, in addition to three extraordinary meetings. The table below summarizes the meetings:

Number	Year	Dates	Outcome	Place	Chairman of the EC	Chairman of the PNC
1	1964	28 May - 2 June	Creation of the PNC, PLO and adoption of the Palestinian National Covenant	Jerusalem	Ahmad Shukeiri	Ahmad Shukeiri
2	1965	31 May - 4 June		Cairo	Ahmad Shukeiri	Ahmad Shukeiri
3	1966	20–24 May		Gaza	Ahmad Shukeiri	Ahmad Shukeiri
Following the Six-Day War:
Transitional period	1967	From 25 December			Yahya Hammuda	Yahya Hammuda
4	1968	10–17 July		Cairo	Yahya Hammuda	Abdel Mohsin Al-Qattan
5	1969	1–4 February	Election of Yasser Arafat	Cairo	Yasser Arafat	Yahya Hammuda
6	1969	1–6 September		Cairo	Yasser Arafat	Yahya Hammuda
7	1970	30 May - 4 June		Cairo	Yasser Arafat	Yahya Hammuda
Extraordinary	1970	27–28 August		Amman	Yasser Arafat	Yahya Hammuda
8	1971	28 February - 5 March		Cairo	Yasser Arafat	Yahya Hammuda
9	1971	7–13 July		Cairo	Yasser Arafat	Khaled al-Fahoum
10	1972	6–12 April		Cairo	Yasser Arafat	Khaled al-Fahoum
11	1973	6–12 January		Cairo	Yasser Arafat	Khaled al-Fahoum
12	1974	1–9 June	PLO's Ten Point Program	Cairo	Yasser Arafat	Khaled al-Fahoum
13	1977	12–22 March		Cairo	Yasser Arafat	Khaled al-Fahoum
14	1979	15–22 January		Damascus	Yasser Arafat	Khaled al-Fahoum
15	1981	11–19 April		Damascus	Yasser Arafat	Khaled al-Fahoum
16	1983	14–22 February		Algiers	Yasser Arafat	Khaled al-Fahoum
17	1984	22–29 November		Amman	Yasser Arafat	Abd al-Hamid al-Sayih
18	1987	20–25 April		Algiers	Yasser Arafat	Abd al-Hamid al-Sayih
19 (extraordinary)	1988	12–15 November	Palestinian Declaration of Independence	Algiers	Yasser Arafat	Abd al-Hamid al-Sayih
20	1991	23–28 September		Algiers	Yasser Arafat	Abd al-Hamid al-Sayih
Following the Oslo Accords:
21	1996	22–25 April		Gaza	Yasser Arafat	Salim al-Za'nun
Election of Chairman	2004	11 November	Election of Mahmoud Abbas	Ramallah	Mahmoud Abbas	Salim al-Za'nun
22 (private meeting)	2009	26–27 August		Ramallah	Mahmoud Abbas	Salim al-Za'nun
23	2018	30 April - 4 May	Transfer of powers to the PCC	Ramallah	Mahmoud Abbas	Salim al-Za'nun

== See also ==
- Palestinian Central Council
- State of Palestine
- Palestinian Declaration of Independence

== Bibliography ==
- Becker, Jillian (1984). The PLO: The Rise and Fall of the Palestine Liberation Organization. St. Martin's Press. ISBN 978-0-312-59380-3.
- Sayigh, Yezid (1997). Armed Struggle and the Search for State: The Palestinian National Movement, 1949-1993. Clarendon Press. ISBN 978-0-19-829265-4.
- Badarin, Emile (2016). Palestinian Political Discourse: Between Exile and Occupation. Routledge Studies on the Arab-Israeli Conflict. Taylor & Francis. ISBN 978-1-317-32600-7.
