= Palestinian Central Council =

Institution of the Palestine Liberation Organization (PLO)

- Formation: 1973; 53 years ago
- Purpose: Decision-making body of the Palestine Liberation Organization
- Chairman: Rawhi Fattouh
- Parent organization: Palestinian National Council

The Palestinian Central Council (PCC; Arabic: المجلس المركزي الفلسطيني, romanized: al-Majlis al-Markazī al-Filasṭīnī), also known as the PLO Central Council, is one of the institutions of the Palestine Liberation Organization (PLO). The PCC makes policy decisions when the Palestinian National Council (PNC) is not in session, and acts as a link between the PNC and the PLO Executive Committee.

The PCC serves as the intermediary body between the PNC and the EC. The PCC is chaired by the PNC chairman, and has increasingly eclipsed the PNC as the main decision-making body of the PLO. In 2018, the PNC transferred its legislative powers to the PCC, including powers to elect members of the EC.

The PCC is elected by the PNC after nomination by the PLO Executive and chaired by the PNC president.

== History ==
The membership has risen from 42 (1976), 55 (1977), 72 (1984), 107 (early 90s), 95 (mid-90s) to 124 (1996). As of April 1996, the PCC consisted of 124 members from the PLO Executive Committee, PNC, PLC and other Palestinian organizations.

On 5 January 2013, it was announced that the PLO had delegated the duties of the Palestinian Authority’s government and parliament to the Central Council.
