= Assassination of Rehavam Ze'evi =

2001 murder in Jerusalem

- Part of the Second Intifada militancy campaign
- The attack site
- Location: 31°47′48″N 35°14′09″E; Hyatt Regency hotel, Mount Scopus, Jerusalem
- Date: 17 October 2001; 25 years ago c. 7:00 am (GMT+2)
- Target: Rehavam Ze'evi
- Weapon: Pistol with silencer
- Deaths: 1 killed (Rehavam Ze'evi)
- Perpetrator: Three Palestinian assailants. The Popular Front for the Liberation of Palestine claimed responsibility.

Israel's tourism minister Rehavam Ze'evi was assassinated shortly before 7 am (GMT+2) on Wednesday 17 October 2001 at the former Hyatt Regency Hotel in Jerusalem by a squad of Palestinians acting on behalf of the Popular Front for the Liberation of Palestine militant organization. Ze'evi was the first Israeli minister to be assassinated since the assassination of Yitzhak Rabin and the most senior Israeli person to be killed by Palestinian militants during the entire Arab–Israeli conflict.

Ze'evi's assassins fled the scene and hid for a time in the Mukataa compound in Ramallah under the auspices of Yasser Arafat. An agreement was eventually reached during Operation Defensive Shield, in which Israeli forces besieged the Mukataa compound. Ze'evi's assassins were transferred to the Jericho prison under the supervision of British and American guards. The Islamist militant organization Hamas won the Palestinian legislative elections in January 2006, and Hamas leader Ismail Haniyeh publicly announced his intention to free Ze'evi's assassin squad members. On 14 March 2006, the American and British guards left the Jericho jail, charging that the Palestinian Authority was not sticking to the agreement reached with Israel four years earlier. As a result, Israel launched Operation Bringing Home the Goods on the same day in which the Israel Defense Forces captured Ze'evi's assassins; they were tried in Israel, convicted, and given long prison terms.

== Preparations phase ==
In September 2001 the PFLP reached a decision to assassinate the Israeli tourism minister Rehavam Ze'evi purportedly in retaliation for the assassination of the PFLP leader Abu Ali Mustafa by Israel in August 2001.

As a result, the PFLP began gathering detailed intelligence information on Ze'evi's whereabouts and schedule, and found out that he had a permanent room in the Hyatt Regency hotel in Jerusalem, located on the border between the neighborhoods of French Hill and Mount Scopus.

The assassin squad members booked a room at the hotel by telephone and provided a fake ID. The assassins arrived at the hotel the night before the assassination in order to prepare for the attack.

== Assassination ==
On 17 October 2001, the day of the assassination, Rehavam Ze'evi was staying at the Dan Jerusalem Hotel, formerly called at the time, the Hyatt Regency Hotel, in room number 816. Ze'evi did not have any bodyguards, as he principally refused to change his habits due to terrorist threats.

At 6:00 am, one of the assassins, Hamdi Quran, went to the dining room of the hotel to make sure that Minister Ze'evi would indeed be there in accordance with his routine schedule. At 6:20 am Ze'evi and his wife Yael went down to the hotel's dining room. When Quran noticed the minister was in the dining hall, he immediately went back to the room where the assassins were staying and updated his associates. As a result, two assailants headed towards their vehicle, which was parked in the hotel's basement parking lot, to fetch their pistols which were modified with silencers. In order not to raise suspicion, the two assailants returned separately to their room through the staircase instead of the elevator.

The two assailants met in their room, prepared their weapons, and headed toward Ze'evi's room on the 8th floor. The assailants waited for Ze'evi near the fire escape, in a location adjacent to Ze'evi's room.

Meanwhile, at 6:45 am Ze'evi's driver, Adi Maman, arrived at the hotel's dining room and joined Ze'evi and his wife for breakfast. At 6:50 am Ze'evi headed by himself towards his room using the elevator. Two minutes later, Yael Ze'evi and the driver, Adi Maman, also began heading towards Ze'evi's room.

When the elevator door opened Ze'evi stepped out of the elevator and passed the two assailants. According to the assailants' testimony, Quran shouted at him "Hey!" and when Ze'evi turned to Quran, he shot Ze'evi in the head three times from a close distance. Two bullets hit Ze'evi's head. Although the second bullet hit Ze'evi's jaw and did not cause a fatal injury, the first bullet penetrated his brain and caused irreversible damage. Immediately after assassinating Ze'evi, the assassins escaped the scene of the crime. From the hotel, the assassins fled to the Palestinian Authority controlled area in the West Bank.

At 7:00 am, only a few minutes after the attack, Ze'evi's wife and driver discovered Ze'evi lying on the floor of the corridor, shot in the head and bleeding.

Ze'evi was rushed to the Hadassah Medical Center in Jerusalem in critical condition and the doctors attempted to save him. His death was eventually announced at 10:00 am.

Ze'evi was the first Israeli minister to be assassinated since the assassination of Yitzhak Rabin, and the most senior Israeli person to be killed by Palestinian militants during the entire Arab-Israeli conflict.

== Claim of responsibility ==
The PFLP claimed responsibility for the assassination and stated that it was carried out as a revenge for the assassination of the PFLP leader Abu Ali Mustafa in August 2001. Rabah Muhana, a senior PFLP official, said "The Israelis killed one prominent leader and Mr Ze'evi is one of those who have very, very right-wing points of view on discrimination – he wants to deport Palestinians and he is with the most severe terrorism against the Palestinians".

== Ze'evi's funeral ==
The assassination of Ze'evi was a shock to the Israeli public and left a lasting impression on many Israelis. Thousands of people attended the funeral of Ze'evi that took place a day after the assassination, at the Mount Herzl cemetery in Jerusalem, where Ze'evi was buried. President Moshe Katsav and Prime Minister Ariel Sharon eulogized Ze'evi at his funeral.

== Official reactions ==
=== Involved parties ===
==== Israel ====
- Prime minister Ariel Sharon stated that after Ze'evi's assassination "everything had changed", and he held the Palestinian leader, Yasser Arafat, personally responsible for the assassination.

==== Palestinian territories ====
- Palestinian Authority condemned the assassination, but laced the statement with a call for Israel to immediately cease its policy of assassinating Palestinian militant leaders who Israel believes are responsible for launching attacks.
- President of the Palestinian Authority Yasser Arafat condemned the act and said he would do all he could to arrest the assassins.

=== International ===
- United Kingdom: UK prime minister Tony Blair condemned the assassination stating "We condemn utterly this contemptible act of violence".
- United States: US President George W. Bush condemned the assassination in the strongest terms and called it a despicable act.

== Subsequent related events ==
=== Israeli siege of the Mukataa and the following "Ramallah Agreement" ===
Immediately after the assassination, the Israeli security establishment launched an intensive investigation to track down the assassins and the PFLP leader who initiated and planned the attack. Israel demanded from the Palestinian Authority to arrest those responsible for the assassination.

In April 2002, during Operation Defensive Shield, Israeli security forces learned that the assassins were hiding in the Mukataa, Yasser Arafat's presidential compound in Ramallah, which Israeli troops had besieged since 29 March. Israel demanded that the Palestinian Authority hand over the assassins in return for withdrawing its troops. The Palestinian Authority refused to extradite the assassins. In the end, through international mediation, Israel agreed to a proposal (which came to be known as the "Ramallah Agreement") whereby Ze'evi's assassins would be imprisoned in a Jericho jail guarded by British and American forces, and in return Israel would remove the siege of Yasser Arafat's compound. As a result, in February 2002, Arafat ordered to arrest Ze'evi's assassin squad members and imprison them in the Jericho prison. In May 2002 the British and American forces arrived at the Jericho prison.

Nevertheless, after the Islamist militant organization Hamas won the Palestinian legislative elections in January 2006, the Hamas leader Ismail Haniyeh publicly announced his intention to free Ze'evi's assassin squad members. On 14 March 2006, the American and British guards left the Jericho jail, charging that the Palestinian Authority was not sticking to the agreement reached with Israel four years earlier. As a result, Israel launched Operation Bringing Home the Goods on the same day.

=== Operation Bringing Home the Goods ===
On 14 March 2006, IDF forces raided the Jericho prison where Ze'evi's assassin squad members were imprisoned with the aim of preventing them from being released by the Hamas government, and bringing the assassins to face trial in Israel.

After a siege which lasted about 10 and a half hours, and after the Israeli military forces began using bulldozers to tear down the Jericho prison walls, the four assassins finally surrendered:

- Ahed Abu Gholma – the mastermind behind the assassination of Rehavam Ze'evi.
- Majdi Rahima Rimawi – the head of the assassination squad who was the getaway driver during the operation.
- Hamdi Quran – the actual person who shot Rehavam Ze'evi.
- Bassel al-Asmar – the look-out for the operation.

During the raid, in addition to the four assassins, Israel also captured Ahmed Saadat (who Israel alleges ordered Ze'evi's assassination) and Fuad Shubaki (suspected by Israel as being the mastermind behind a shipment from Iran of smuggled weapons seized by Israel in January 2002).

=== Assassins' trial in Israel ===
Ze'evi's assassins were tried in Israel. The four were convicted and received long prison terms – Quran received a sentence of 125 years in prison, Asmar received a sentence of 45 years in prison and Majdi Rahima Rimawi received a life sentence with an additional 80 years in prison and Ahad Olma was sentenced to 30 years in prison for his role in initiating and planning the assassination.

In addition, on 25 December 2008, an Israeli military court sentenced Ahmed Saadat, being the leader of the PFLP, to 30 years in prison for heading an "illegal terrorist organization" and for his responsibility for all actions carried out by his organization, especially for the assassination of Rehavam Ze'evi.

== Honouring of assassin by Bezons, France ==
In February 2013, one of the gunmen involved in the murder, Majdi Al-Rimawi, was named an "honorary resident" of Bezons, a French city located 10 miles northwest of Paris. At a ceremony, the city's mayor, Dominique Lesparre, presented Rimawi's son, daughter and wife with the plaque honouring Rimawi. Lesparre describes Rimawi as being "jailed for 10 years for taking part with his people in the struggle to resist the occupation of their country" and as one of many Palestinians who has been "imprisoned for daring to defend their country." Lesparre was sharply criticized by Moshe Kantor, who stated that "It is inconceivable that an elected official can be so ignorant as to call a cold-blooded murderer a victim." The Israeli Foreign Ministry also criticized the decision, stating that it was "humanly outrageous to honor a convicted murderer, no political view can justify it."

== See also ==
- Attempted assassination of Yehuda Glick
- Silent Intifada
