= Operation Bringing Home the Goods =

2006 Israeli military operation

- Part of the Israeli–Palestinian conflict
Date	March 14, 2006
Location	Jericho, Palestinian Authority 31°51′2.9″N 35°27′1.4″E
Result	Israeli victory

Belligerents
Israel (IDF)	Palestinian Authority

Commanders and leaders
(Israel) Yair Naveh	(Palestinian Authority) Ahmad Sa'adat (POW)

Strength
1,000 soldiers	200 guards and prisoners

Casualties and losses
None	2 killed 28 wounded Several captured

Operation Bringing Home the Goods (Hebrew: מבצע הבאת ביכורים, romanized: Mivtza Hava'at Bikurim) was a raid launched by the Israel Defense Forces (IDF) on March 14, 2006, on a Palestinian prison in Jericho. The prison held several prisoners wanted by Israel, whose incarceration was monitored by British and American wardens. In early 2006, the newly elected Hamas government announced that it intended to release the prisoners.

On March 14, the monitors left, and the IDF raided the prison. The prisoners put up a fight and, after a ten-hour siege, surrendered and were arrested. A series of riots and kidnapping of foreigners ensued throughout the Palestinian territories.

== Background ==
In 2001, in response to the assassination of its secretary general Abu Ali Mustafa, the Popular Front for the Liberation of Palestine (PFLP), led by Ahmed Sa'adat, assassinated Israeli minister of tourism Rehavam Ze'evi. Fuad Shubaki was suspected by Israel as being the mastermind behind the Karine A affair of 2002. Sa'adat, Shubaki, and four other Palestinians, including the man who shot Ze'evi, were held at the Jericho jail under the supervision of British and American wardens in accordance with a deal worked out between US President, George W. Bush and Israeli Prime Minister, Ariel Sharon, in April 2002. The agreement allowed the prisoners to be transferred from Yasser Arafat's Mukataa in Ramallah, where they were hiding during Operation Defensive Shield of April 2002. The four cell members who actively participated in Ze'evi's assassination were Hamdi Quran, who pulled the trigger, Basel al-Amar, Majdi Rimawi and Ahed Gholami. In a quick military trial in Ramallah, headed by Brigadier-General Ribhi Arafat, they were sentenced to hard labor. Quran was sentenced to 18 years, Asmar to 12, Rimawi to eight and Gholami to one year. Sa'adat was not placed on trial but remained in custody. The prison was situated next to the Palestinian Authority (PA) government building. Israeli rightists opposed the deal, saying it allowed the assassin to escape justice, while Palestinians opposed the jailing of a senior militant leader under Israeli pressure.

In the Palestinian elections of January 2006, Sa'adat was elected to the Palestinian legislature. The newly elected Hamas government announced its intention to release Ze'evi's assassins. Hamas leader Khaled Mashal told Arab-Israeli newspaper Kul al-Arab that his organization would positively consider Sa'adat's release, saying "Hamas' objects to the imprisonment of Palestinians in PA jails, especially those under US and British supervision, as is the case in the Jericho prison. Therefore, their release will be our new government's top priority; it is natural that we begin a process for their release to strengthen our position so we will be able to act for the release of those held in Israeli prisons". Palestinian Authority chairman Mahmoud Abbas said, "I see no problem in releasing him [Sa'adat], but the Israel government is threatening to kill him—and then who will be held responsible if he gets killed or hurt? If the PLFP is willing to take responsibility, then I have no objection—I'll release him; then he and the PLFP will suffer the consequences. The minute he leaves prison an Apache will kill him".

Avi Dichter, former Shin Bet head and candidate for the position of Defense Minister for the Kadima party, said "I recommend to the Palestinian Authority not to release these men. I vow these killers will be either in prison or in the grave. There is no other option for them", and that "Israel could have sent an F-16 plane to target the prison, but we don't wish to harm innocent people". On March 8, the US and British consuls general in Jerusalem sent a letter to Abbas on March 8, warning that the monitoring team, consisting of fourteen men, would be pulled out of Jericho if the security situation did not improve for the monitors. Israeli Defense Minister, Shaul Mofaz, instructed the IDF to draw a plan to arrest Sa'adat, and the IDF began planning for the possibility that it would be required to act.

== Raid and siege ==
On March 14, the monitors told Palestinian authorities at the prison they were getting their car fixed. Then they headed straight for the Israeli checkpoint on the road out of Jericho. At around 09:00, Israeli soldiers stationed at the checkpoint spotted the monitors leaving the city. Immediately after, special forces, backed up by tanks, converged on the prison in order to force the wanted men out. At around 09:30, some 100 Israeli soldiers were surrounding the prison. By the end of the siege, the IDF had committed a force of approximately 1,000 soldiers from an armored division. Reports from the scene said 50 jeeps, three tanks, and an armored bulldozer pushed into Jericho, and two helicopters were flying overhead. At the time of the raid, there were a total of 200 prisoners and guards in the prison.

A senior IDF officer told reporters on the outskirts of Jericho that "We want to take them out alive, but if they threaten us, we won't hesitate to kill them. We won't agree to any change in Sa'adat's prison status". Some inmates took control of an armory in the prison. Israeli troops encircled the building while bulldozers knocked down nearby walls and helicopters fired missiles in an attempt to turn the prison into a "pressure cooker". The Israelis called on all the Palestinians to come out of the compound. Many came out, including security officials and prisoners, who stripped to their underwear, as the Israelis had ordered. Sa'adat told Al Jazeera television in a telephone interview from the prison that "Our choice is to fight or to die. We will not surrender", and that "We are not going to give up, we are going to face our destiny with courage". However, by nightfall, he ordered his men to put down their weapons and surrender. Shortly after 19:00, Chief of the Israeli Central Command, Major-General Yair Naveh, announced that the wanted men and several other militants in the jail had surrendered. The six, stripped to their underpants, surrendered and were questioned by security officials in the prison compound. The IDF also arrested 67 other Palestinians who were still hiding inside the compound.

Throughout the day, young Palestinians threw stones at Israeli troops who sealed off several blocks around the compound. Along a narrow residential street leading to the compound, teenagers from the nearby Hisham Bin Abdel Malik School threw rocks at IDF jeeps a block away, then scattered through groves of fruit trees amid Israeli gunfire. A university student and a young boy were wounded. PA security officers also clashed with the IDF. Two PA security men were killed during the fighting, and twenty-eight were wounded. The IDF suffered no casualties. A third of the compound was demolished by IDF bulldozers. The Israelis said they evacuated three wounded Palestinians. An IDF spokesman said 182 people had been taken from the prison and were being questioned, including twenty-six wounded. Between thirty and eighty people were left in the compound.

== Riots, protests, kidnappings ==
A wave of Palestinian unrest followed the raid. Gunmen kidnapped the director of the International Red Cross in Gaza, and two French citizens and a Korean were seized from a hotel in Gaza City, one of whom was shot dead by security forces. A British Council cultural center in Gaza was set on fire and a European Union compound was stormed. The border crossing between Gaza and Egypt was shut for the day after European monitors withdrew because of security threats. Militants briefly held an American teacher at the Arab American University in Jenin and two Australian teachers in northern Gaza for two hours before being released. Al-Aqsa Martyrs' Brigades in Gaza City warned US and UK nationals to leave the Palestinian territories immediately. Hundreds of Palestinians in Gaza and the West Bank demonstrated against the Israeli raid and what they considered the complicity of western governments. Some of the kidnappers demanded that the army halt its operation in Jericho and threatened to hurt their captives. One kidnapper in Nablus told Ynet: "If the operation won't end we'll execute captives".

Some 15,000 Palestinians held a protest march in Gaza City, and militants vowed renewed attacks against Israel. In Nablus, hundreds chanted anti-Abbas slogans during a protest. Most business owners in the Gaza Strip began shutting down their stores in protest of the operation, thereby launching a spontaneous general strike. All the armed Palestinian organizations except Hamas' al-Qassam Brigades issued statements threatening to harm Israel should it not halt the operation. Meanwhile, the Israel Prison Service decided to raise the alert level in all Israeli prisons where Palestinian security prisoners were being held. All prison guards were asked to be extremely alert to the prisoners' behavior in order to prevent any plan of initiating riots.

== Reactions ==
=== Israeli ===
Israel's acting Prime Minister, Ehud Olmert, said that "We are proud that we have imposed justice on these killers", and that the Palestinians who were seized "will be indicted according to Israeli law, and they will be punished as they deserve". He also said: "Rehavam Ze'evi, Israel has restored your honor with the operation we carried out yesterday". Naveh said that "The message of the operation is clear. The blood of an Israeli minister will not be forfeited and the perpetrators will be hunted down". Israeli officials said the crossing points, already closed for the Jewish holiday of Purim, would remain closed for at least a few days. Ze'evi's son, Palmach Ze'evi, said that "For four years the killers sat half an hour away from Jerusalem and we didn't settle the score. But today things are changing", but described Olmert's actions as "underhanded opportunism". Yisrael Beiteinu chairman Avigdor Lieberman said "I bless Israel for taking this step. The actions are correct and honorable". He claimed that Israel had no choice but to go into the jail in reaction to statements by the PA that it planned to release the men, and added "I don't understand why they need to lay siege to the jail—they need to completely destroy it without leaving a single stone standing".

Kadima's Shimon Peres blamed Hamas for the operation, saying that "Hamas is responsible for the events in Jericho because it decided to breach the agreements on the subject of Zeevi's killers and release them". Israeli left-wingers suggested that Olmert's decision to launch the operation had to do with the upcoming 2006 Israeli elections. Knesset Member Zehava Gal-On of Meretz-Yachad said that while Ze'evi's assassins are "disgusting murderers who should stay behind bars", the operation "has the slight scent of elections". Gush Shalom said that the operation was meant to attract right-wing voters to Kadima. Arab-Israeli Knesset Member Azmi Bishara said "It's like gang activity and a wanted-dead-or-alive style of operation. The only meaning of this is that if the Palestinian people will not defend themselves, their institutions, and their leaders, Israel will do as it sees fit". Ra'am-Ta'al MK Ahmad Tibi said that "Kadima and its leaders are using Palestinian blood as a doorway for their election success".

=== Palestinian ===
Palestinian prime minister-designate, Ismail Haniyeh, said during the siege that "The occupation forces' operation is a serious escalation and blatant violation of agreements on Palestinian prisoners with Israel. We warn against any harm to Sa'adat and we see the Israeli operation as part of the elections in Israel. This is unacceptable to us and the Palestinian people. These operations will not scare the Palestinian people and won't dictate surrender to the occupiers. We call on all sides to act responsibly to stop this operation in Jericho and prevent further deterioration". Mahmoud Zahar said that "It seems like nobody can win the election among the Israelis without dipping his hands in the blood of the Palestinians".

The Palestinian president, Mahmoud Abbas, called the raid an "unforgivable crime" and suggested Britain and the US had coordinated their withdrawal so Israel could send in tanks as soon as the monitors left. He asked: "I'm giving the facts. They [the monitors] left at 9.20am and the Israelis came in at 9.30am. How can we explain that?". Palestinian negotiator Saeb Erekat said that "This was a severe blow to the Palestinian Authority and to Abu Mazen [Abbas] personally". Sufian Abu Zaida, the Palestinian minister of prisoners, told Israel Radio that the operation "was designed to show the Palestinians what the Israelis can do, and to show the Hamas government what will happen—no agreements, no cooperation, no coordination, only force".

A senior PFLP member said "We will respond, and we will respond harshly, whether Sa'adat is harmed or not". Khalida Jarrar, a member of the Palestinian Legislative Council representing the PFLP, said that "Sa'adat was the winning card for Olmert in the elections. We demand of the international community to fulfill its obligations and responsibilities towards the Palestinian people against the crimes of the occupation".

=== British and American ===
British Prime Minister Tony Blair blamed the PA for the raid and its outcome, and told the House of Commons that he had personally warned Abbas that the British personnel would be withdrawn unless security agreements were met. He said that "[t]he agreement was that the Palestinians would take charge [of the Jericho] prison and it would be monitored by us. We have kept to the agreement every step of the way. The breach was because the proper procedures were not being kept by the Palestinian side". British Foreign Secretary Jack Straw said, "We kept saying to the Palestinians 'please, please, please improve the security and ensure the conditions of the Ramallah Agreement are being observed and ensure the security of our personnel'". On the morning of March 14 he gave the House of Commons a written statement stating that as the PA had "consistently failed to meet its obligations under the Ramallah Agreement" and as a result the British government has "terminated our involvement with the mission today". Regarding the fire set to the British Council in Gaza City and reports of kidnaps of foreign nationals, Straw said, "I must emphasize the Government's condemnation of the appalling acts of violence. They are totally unwarranted".

Israeli officials said the British informed them Friday that they would be withdrawing the monitoring team but did not provide a date. U.S. officials said the Israelis and the Palestinians were notified as the three British guards on duty at the time departed. Stuart Tuttle, a spokesman for the U.S. Embassy in Tel Aviv, said that "The withdrawal decision was made on the ground and not in coordination with the Israelis". Senior U.S. officials said they had no choice but to abandon the facility, even though they realized it might undermine the Palestinian Authority, and that they did not make public their concerns because they believed publicity would have made the U.S. and British personnel the targets of attacks. A senior administration official said: "That is the price we pay. Our first responsibility is the safety of American and British monitors". State Department spokesman J. Adam Ereli denied any coordination with Israel and said: "Such accusations are baseless and ignore the facts, quite frankly".

== See also ==
- 2006 Palestinian legislative election
- Acre Prison siege
- Entebbe raid
- Irgun and Lehi internment in Africa
