= Ahmad Sa'adat =

Palestinian politician (born 1953)

- أحمد سعدات
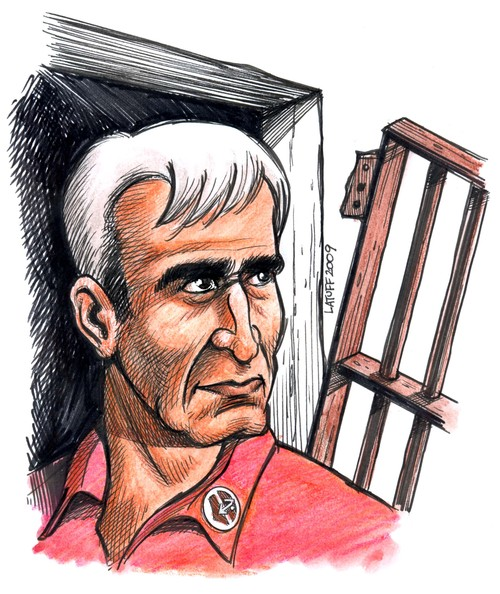
- Portrait by Carlos Latuff, 2009

General Secretary of the Popular Front for the Liberation of Palestine
- Incumbent
- Assumed office 3 October 2001
- Preceded by: Abu Ali Mustafa

Member of the Palestinian Legislative Council
- Incumbent
- Assumed office 18 February 2006

Personal details
- Born: 23 February 1953 (age 73) al-Bireh, Jordanian-administered West Bank, Palestine
- Party: Popular Front for the Liberation of Palestine
- Spouse: Abla Sa'adat
- Children: 4
- Education: UNRWA Teachers College

Ahmad Sa'adat (also transliterated Sadat or Saadat; Arabic: أحمد سعدات; born 23 February 1953), also known as Abu Ghassan, is a Palestinian politician who is the Secretary-General of the Popular Front for the Liberation of Palestine (PFLP) since 3 October 2001, which is a Marxist–Leninist Palestinian nationalist organisation, and serving in the Palestinian Legislative Council since 18 February 2006. Sa'adat graduated in 1975 from the UNRWA Teachers College, Ramallah, specializing in Mathematics. Sa'adat was elected General Secretary of the PFLP by its Central Committee in October 2001, to succeed Abu Ali Mustafa after his assassination by Israel during the Second Intifada. He has been sentenced to prison terms and held in prison since 2002.

Sa'adat spent many years in Israeli prisons, on eight occasions. He was accused by Israel of organizing the assassination of Israeli tourism minister Rehavam Ze'evi, and took refuge in the Muqata'a headquarters of PLO leader Yassir Arafat, which was then besieged by Israel after Arafat refused to hand him over to Israel. As part of an agreement with Israel, Sa'adat was tried by the Palestinian National Authority (PNA) and imprisoned at the Jericho prison in 2002. In the Palestinian elections of January 2006, Sa'adat was elected to the Palestinian Legislative Council. On 14 March 2006, Hamas announced their intention to release Sa'adat from prison. The US and British team monitoring Jericho prison left, citing poor security conditions. On the same day, Israeli forces carried out Operation Bringing Home the Goods, taking Sa'adat and five other security prisoners into custody. In December 2008 he was given a 30-year prison sentence by an Israeli military court. He was held in solitary confinement in an Israeli prison and his health deteriorated after frequent hunger strikes in protest of Israeli policies. Since 2012, Sa'adat is no longer in solitary confinement.

== Political views ==
Sa'adat is the General Secretary of the Popular Front for the Liberation of Palestine (PFLP). In the context of the Israeli–Palestinian conflict Sa'adat persistently claims that a one state solution is the only possible solution for the conflict, he holds that "The solution is the one-state solution and not the two-state solution." Saadat said: "There are no other horizons for any other settlement." Sa'adat also holds that "The communist forces in the Arab world have applied the viewpoints of the Soviet Union by the book and have never developed their own theoretical and political 'flavor'”.

== Imprisonment by Palestinian Authority ==
Sa'adat was accused by Israel of organizing the assassination of the Israeli Tourism Minister, Rehavam Ze'evi, who was killed on 17 October 2001. He took refuge in the Muqata'a headquarters of PLO leader Yasser Arafat, who refused to hand him over to Israel, leading to an Israeli siege.

After negotiations involving the UK and US, an agreement (sometimes called the "Jericho Deal") was reached between Israel and the Palestinian National Authority. Israel called off the siege of the Muqata'a on 2 May 2002, and Sa'adat and four members of the PFLP implicated in Ze'evi's killing (Basel al-Asmar, 'Ahed Abu Ghalma, Majdi al-Rimawi and Hamdi Quran) were arrested by the PNA. Sa'adat was tried in a Palestinian court while the other four were given a military trial. All were then held in the Palestinian prison in Jericho, with American and British monitors overseeing their captivity. Sa'adat was not allowed to run for political office, give interviews or address the public, although these bans were occasionally circumvented or ignored.

The Palestinian Supreme Court declared that Sa'adat's imprisonment was unconstitutional, and ordered his release, but the PNA has refused to comply. Amnesty International has declared that this, and the fact that he received an unfair trial, makes his detention illegal, and that he must either be charged with a crime and given due process, or released.

At the 2006 Palestinian election, Sa'adat was elected to the Palestinian Legislative Council and Hamas formed government. Hamas announced its intention to release Ze'evi's assassins.

== Imprisonment by Israel ==
On 14 March 2006, the American and British monitors were withdrawn from the Jericho prison where Sa'adat and five other security prisoners were being held citing lack of security, and Israeli forces then launched Operation Bringing Home the Goods, surrounding the prison to prevent the escape of the security prisoners, including Sa'adat. In the ensuing stand-off, Palestinian guards left the prison but 200 prisoners refused to surrender. A ten-hour standoff ensued, with Israeli soldiers besieging the prison and clashing with Palestinian Authority security personnel, as Sa'adat and five other prisoners barricaded themselves inside. During the course of the standoff, two Palestinian security officers were killed and 28 wounded, and Sa'adat eventually ordered his men to lay down their arms and surrender.

Israeli military forces took Sa'adat and the other five security prisoners into custody. On 25 December 2008, an Israeli military court sentenced Sa'adat to 30 years in prison for heading an "illegal terrorist organization" and for his responsibility for all actions carried out by his organization, particularly for the murder of Rehavam Ze'evi. The judges said:

There is no doubt that the accused controls the PFLP. When we consider the appropriate sentence for someone who headed a murderous terrorist organization, we take into account not only his position, but his actions as well. The offenses the accused has been convicted of indicate that he initiated and participated in military activity with the aim of killing innocent people.

There was speculation that Hamas was attempting to include Sa'adat among the Palestinian prisoners released in the October 2011 Gilad Shalit prisoner exchange. Israel refused to include Sa'adat in the final deal.

Sa'adat was placed in solitary confinement. In 2010, the Israeli Supreme Court refused an appeal by Sadaat to be let out of solitary confinement, accepting the prosecution's claim that there was evidence Sa'adat had sent messages to terrorist operatives from within prison.

On 27 September 2011, Sa'adat and other members of the PFLP (hundreds according to an Amnesty International report) held in Israeli prisons began a hunger strike to protest against worsening Israeli prison policies and solitary confinement.

The hunger strike was overshadowed by the deal agreed between Hamas and Israel for the release of over 1,000 Palestinian prisoners in exchange for captured soldier Gilad Shalit. The prisoners' swap deal left out Sa'adat.

Sa'adat and the other PFLP prisoners ended their hunger strike on 17 October 2011, the 21st day of the hunger strike, after Israeli prison authorities agreed to end solitary confinements.

In 2022, while still in prison, he was re-elected as leader of the PFLP. Jamil Mezher was named as deputy leader.

On 1 October 2023, Ahmad Sa'adat and 90 others Palestinian prisoners in Israel were suddenly moved from Ramon prison to Nafha prison, the week before the full-scale war began on 7 October 2023.

=== 2023–2025 hostage crisis ===
The release of key allied leaders was a repeated demand from Hamas during hostage negotiations during the Gaza war hostage crisis. They have repeatedly requested the release of 3 key prisoners: Ahmad Sa'adat, Marwan Barghouti from Fatah, and Abdullah Barghouti from Hamas' own Qassam Brigades militant wing.

== Family ==
Sa'adat is married to Abla Saadat, and together they have four children, two boys and two girls.

Party political offices
Preceded by Abu Ali Mustafa	General Secretary of the Popular Front for the Liberation of Palestine; 2001–present	Incumbent
