= AAMB =

AAMB may refer to:

- Purdue All-American Marching Band
- Abu Ali Mustapha Brigades, the armed wing of the Popular Front for the Liberation of Palestine
- al-Aqsa Martyrs' Brigades, extremist organisation, West Bank, Middle East
