= Rehavam Ze'evi =

Israeli politician (1926–2001)

- רחבעם זאבי
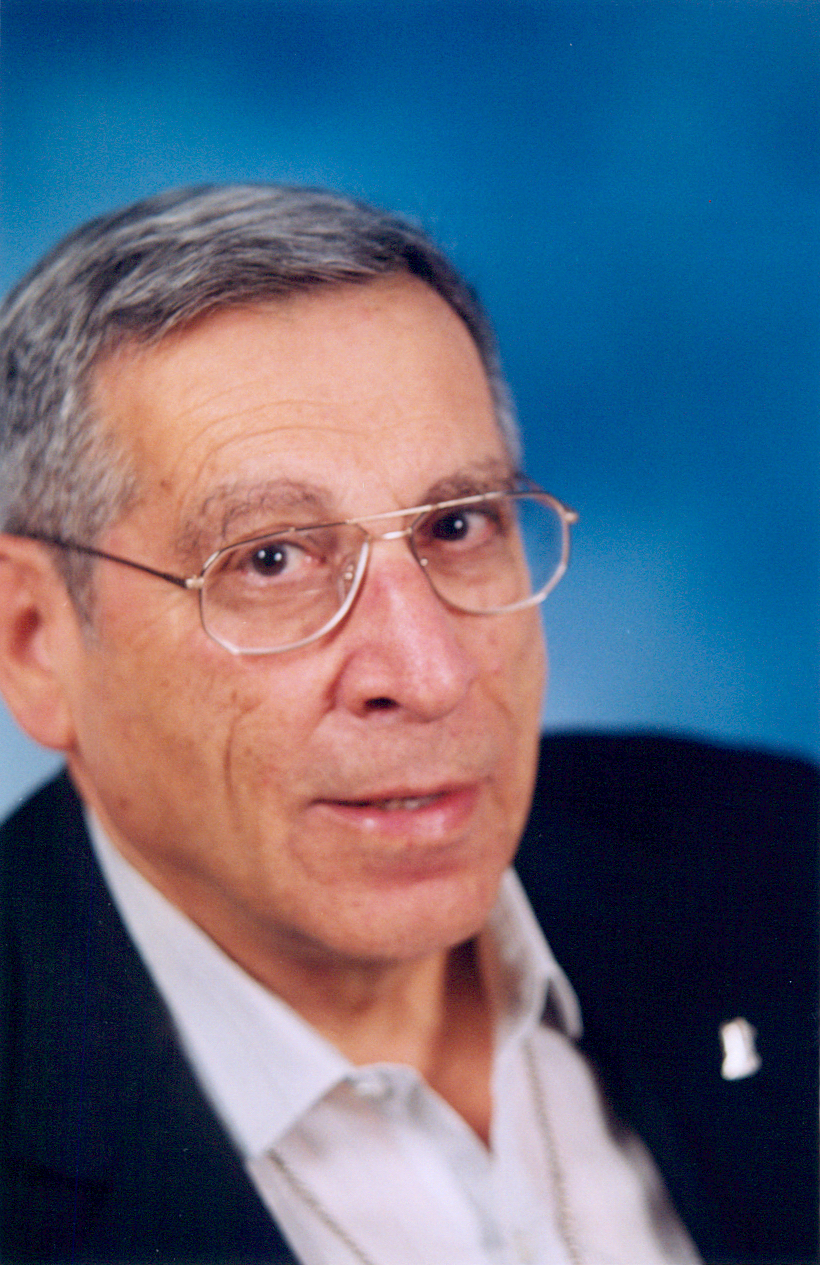
- Ze'evi, c. 1990s

Ministerial roles
- 1991–1992: Minister without Portfolio
- 2001: Minister of Tourism

Faction represented in the Knesset
- 1988–1999: Moledet
- 1999–2001: National Union

Personal details
- Born: 20 June 1926 Jerusalem, Mandatory Palestine
- Died: 17 October 2001 (aged 75) Jerusalem
- Cause of death: Assassination by gunshot
- Resting place: Mount Herzl, Jerusalem

Rehavam Ze'evi (Hebrew: רחבעם זאבי; 20 June 1926 – 17 October 2001) was an Israeli general and politician who founded the far-right nationalist Moledet party. He mainly advocated for the complete ethnic cleansing of the Palestinian population through population transfer.

He was assassinated by Hamdi Quran of the Popular Front for the Liberation of Palestine's (PFLP) Abu Ali Mustafa Brigades in retaliation for Israel's assassination of Abu Ali Mustafa, the Secretary General of the PFLP.

== Biography ==
Ze'evi was born on 20 June 1926 in Jerusalem to a religious Jewish family from the Yemin Moshe neighborhood that had lived in Jerusalem for six generations. He was raised on a collective farm. He joined the Palmach in 1944, and served in the Israel Defense Forces (IDF) after the creation of the State of Israel.

During his youth, Ze'evi went to school in Givat HaShlosha. One night he shaved his head, wrapped a towel round his waist and entered the food hall. The shaved head and towel around his waist gave an appearance reminiscent of Mohandas Gandhi and earned him "Gandhi" as his nickname, which stuck with him for the rest of his life. The nickname is also attributed to a long Arab dress he wore during his underground days in the Palmach. Ze'evi had five children, named Palmach, Sayar, Masada, Tze'ela and Arava. Palmach is also a member of Moledet and competed with Binyamin Elon for the party's leadership.

=== Military career ===
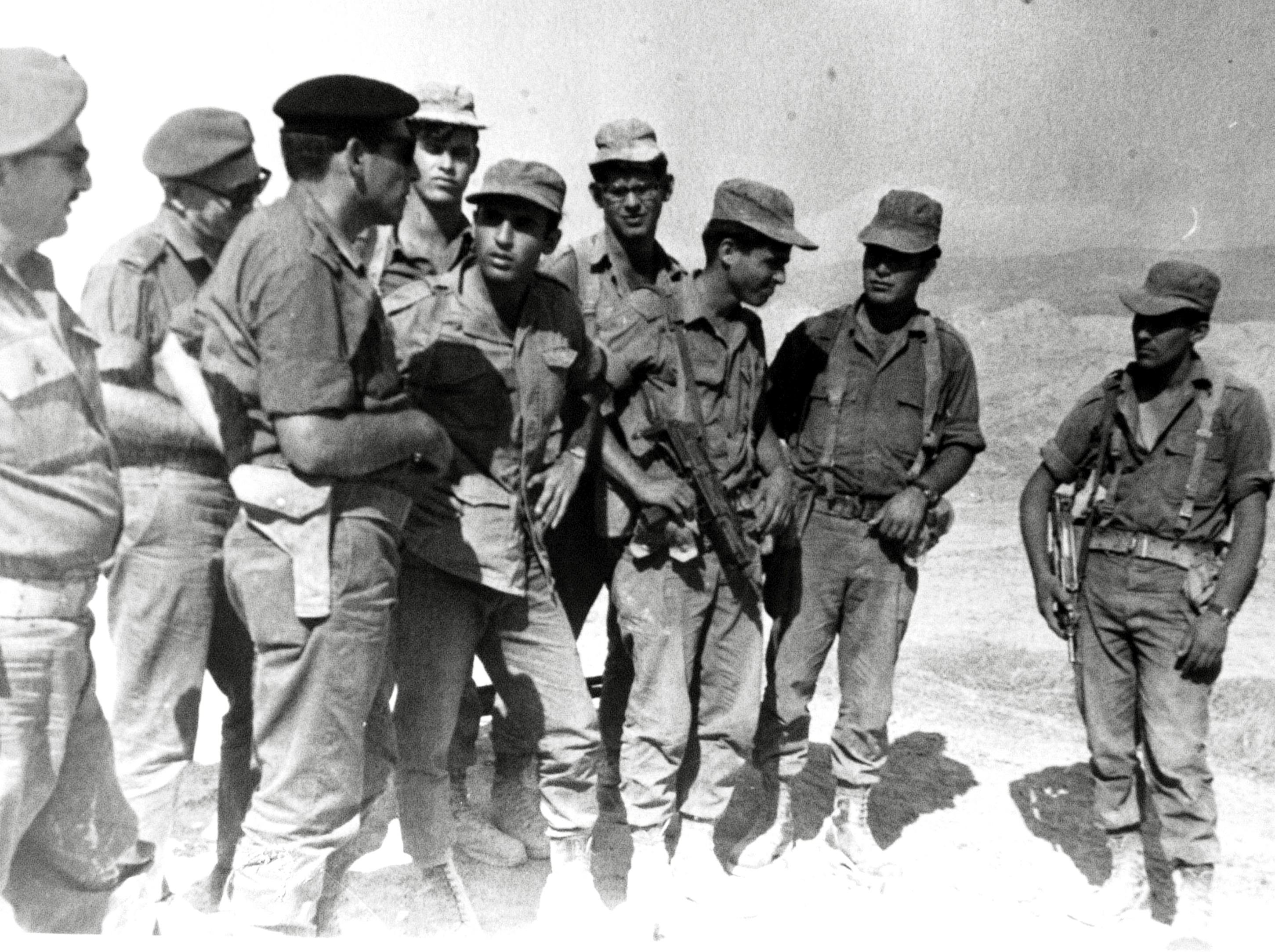
Major Rehavam Ze'evi with Sergeant Shaul Mofaz (on his right) at the end of a chase in the Jordan Rift Valley

In 1948, Ze'evi was a platoon commander in the IDF. From 1964 to 1968, he served as Chief of the Department of Staff in the Israeli General Staff. In the late 1960s, Ze'evi formed the elite Sayeret Kharuv, an anti-terror battalion. This came at the time when IDF Chief of Staff Haim Bar-Lev had begun to focus manpower and budget on armoured tank units, resulting in huge cutbacks in infantry forces. Over the next five years he served as the Commander of the Central Military District (אלוף פיקוד המרכז). He retired in September 1973, but rejoined the army when the Yom Kippur War broke out on 6 October 1973. A close friend of IDF Chief of Staff David Elazar, he was appointed Special Assistant to the Chief of Staff. He retired with the rank of Aluf (Major-General) in 1973.

Ze'evi, known for his concern for Israel's captured or missing soldiers, wore a military identity disc with their names around his neck.

It was revealed in 2004 that Ze'evi had covertly helped build the nascent Singapore Armed Forces at a time when he was deputy head of the Operations Branch in IDF. He secretly visited the city-state in 1965, after which he appointed Yaakov (Jack) Elazari to head a secret military delegation train the Singapore Armed Forces. They were nicknamed "Mexicans" during their stay in Singapore.

=== Political career ===
In 1974, Ze'evi became a consultant on combating terrorism in the government of Prime Minister Yitzhak Rabin. The following year he became the prime minister's adviser on matters of intelligence. Ze'evi resigned from this position in 1977, when Likud's Menachem Begin became prime minister. In 1988, Ze'evi established the Moledet (Homeland) party advocating the population transfer of Arabs from the West Bank and the Gaza Strip to the neighboring Arab countries. In the election of that year, he won a seat in the Knesset which he held until his death.

After the Madrid Conference of 1991, Ze'evi withdrew from the Likud government of Yitzhak Shamir. He would remain in the opposition for a decade. He disagreed strongly with the Labour governments of 1992–1996 led by Yitzhak Rabin and Shimon Peres and 1999–2001 led by Ehud Barak. However, he looked favourably on the Netanyahu government of 1996–1999 and supported it from the outside.

In 1999, Moledet united with Herut – The National Movement and Tkuma into a single faction, the National Union. Following the election of Ariel Sharon in February 2001, Ze'evi joined the coalition and was appointed as Tourism Minister of Israel. Just two days before his killing he tendered his resignation from the post of Tourism Minister.

=== Eretz Yisrael Museum ===
In 1981, Ze'evi was appointed chairman of the board of what was then the Israel Museum in Tel Aviv, a role he would hold for a decade. He was instrumental in its name being changed to the Eretz Israel Museum. The change had political connotations, given the associations with Eretz Israel. In 1987, he co-edited a series of books describing various aspects of the Land of Israel, based on artifacts from the museum. Ze'evi was famous for having one of the largest collections of books about Israel and its history.

=== Assassination ===
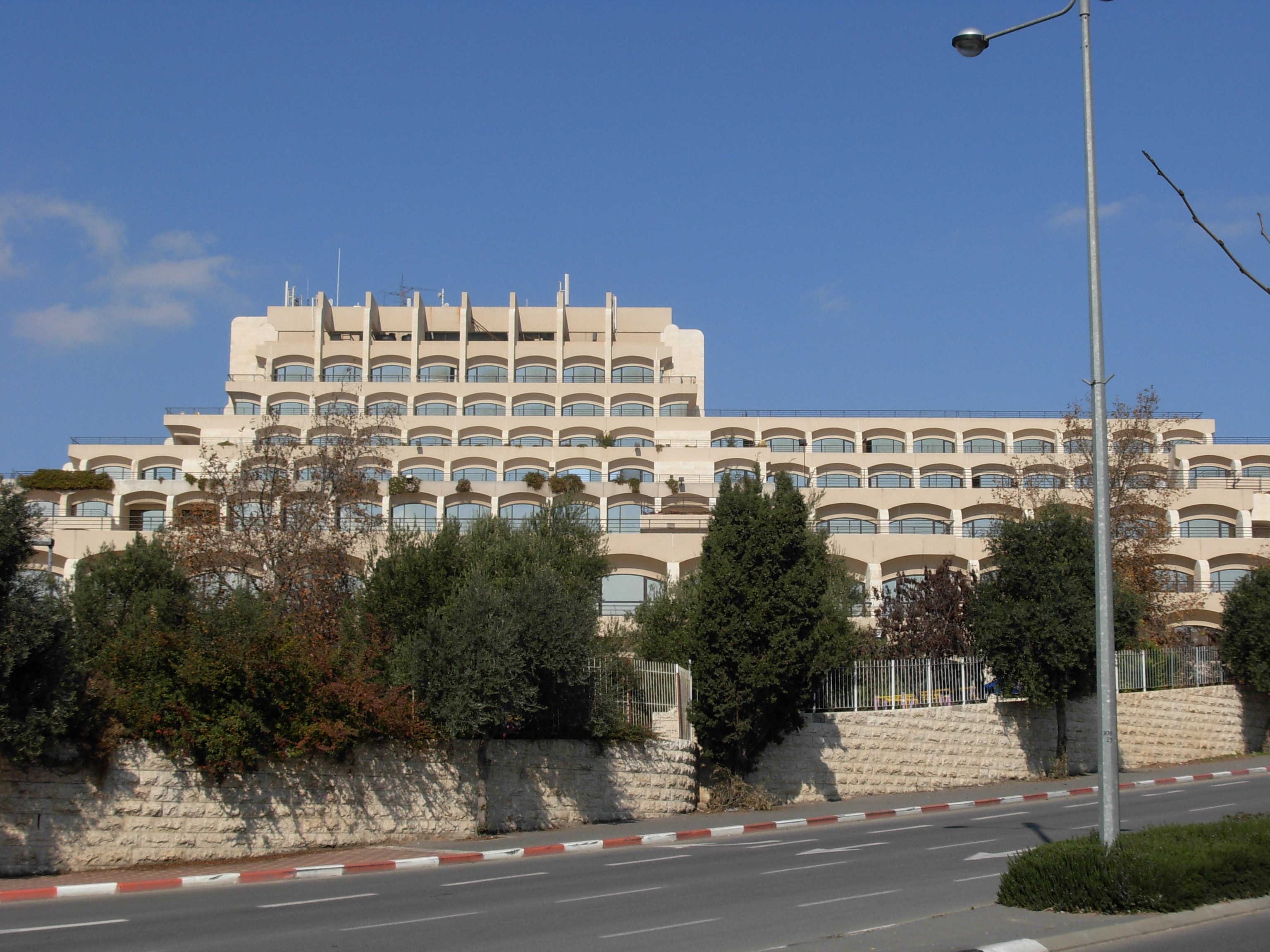
Hyatt Hotel, Mount Scopus

Ze'evi was shot in the Dan Jerusalem Hotel, at the time called the Jerusalem Hyatt Hotel, in Mount Scopus on 17 October 2001 by four Palestinian gunmen. He was taken to the Hadassah Medical Center hospital where he died before 10 am. He was buried in the military cemetery in Mount Herzl in Jerusalem. The Popular Front for the Liberation of Palestine (PFLP) took credit for the killing and stated that it was in revenge for the assassination of their secretary-general Abu Ali Mustafa, who was killed by Israel in August that year. Israel alleged that Ahmed Saadat ordered Ze'evi's assassination. Thousands took part in his funeral. The four gunmen, Hamdi Quran, Basel al-Asmar, Majdi Rahima Rimawi, and Ahad Olma, fled to the Palestinian National Authority. Israel placed Yasser Arafat under siege in the Ramallah compound to force the handing over of the suspects. In April 2002 the United States brokered a plan where the suspects were to be jailed in Jericho instead. The four killers were arrested together with the head of PFLP, Ahmad Sa'adat. They were imprisoned in a jail in Jericho and guarded by American and British forces. On 14 March 2006, the American and British guards left the jail, charging that the Palestinian Authority was not adhering to the agreement reached with Israel. Israel then launched Operation Bringing Home the Goods, in which it raided the Jericho prison and seized the five.

In December 2007, Hamdi Quran confessed in an Israeli court to assassinating Ze'evi together with Basel al-Asmar after being instructed by PFLP member Majdi Rahima Rimawi. He was sentenced to life imprisonment.

In August 2007, Basel al-Asmar was convicted of murder by an Israeli court. In May 2008, he was sentenced to 45 years in prison.

In July 2008, Majdi Rahima Rimawi was convicted of murder by an Israeli court for his part in planning the assassination. According to the verdict, Rahima was the one who supplied the gunmen with a photo of Ze'evi, details of the hotel in which he would be staying and information on the hotel layout. He was sentenced to life in prison and an additional 80 years.

Ahad Olma, who was the head of the PLFP's military wing at the time of the assassination, was sentenced to 30 years in prison for his role in instigating and planning the assassination in December 2008.

In December 2008, an Israeli military court sentenced Ahmad Sa'adat, leader of the PFLP, to 30 years in prison for heading an "illegal terrorist organization" and for his responsibility for all actions carried out by his organization.

== Political views ==
A few days after the Six-Day War, Ze'evi submitted a plan for the creation of a Palestinian state called the State of Ishmael, with Nablus as its capital. He urged Israel's leaders to establish this state as soon as possible, claiming that "Protracted Israeli military rule will expand the hate and the abyss between the residents of the West Bank and Israel, due to the objective steps that will have to be taken in order to ensure order and security."

Ze'evi later advocated the population transfer of 3.3 million residents of the West Bank and Gaza Strip to Arab nations. He believed this could be accomplished by making life difficult so they would relocate on their own, through use of military force during wartime, or by agreement with Arab nations. In July 1987, Ze'evi presented his ideas at a forum in Tel Aviv, describing the plan as a voluntary transfer and the only way to make peace with the Arabs. After the Iraqi invasion of Kuwait in 1990, Ze'evi proposed transferring Palestinians to the east side of the Jordan River to serve as a buffer zone against any Iraqi attempt to attack Israel.

In a radio interview in July 2001, Ze'evi stated that 180,000 Palestinians worked and lived illegally in Israel. He described them as a "cancer" and said Israel should rid itself of those who were not Israeli citizens "the same way you get rid of lice." He called for denying the vote to Arab citizens who did not serve in the army. He believed that Jordan historically belonged to the Tribes of Israel, specifically Gad, Reuven, and Menashe. Zeevi urged Israeli Prime Minister Ariel Sharon to "lay waste to the Palestinian Authority" and assassinate Palestine Liberation Organization leader Yasser Arafat.

Reporting his assassination, the BBC described Ze'evi as "one of the most controversial politicians in Israel" who "repeatedly called for Arabs to be transferred out of the state and is notorious for using the line: 'Let the Arabs go back to Mecca'". Binyamin Elon, leader of the Moledet party after Ze'evi's murder, maintains that Ze'evi did not hate Arabs. Despite being accused of racism, one of Ze'evi's closest friends was the Muslim Israeli-Arab officer and war hero Amos Yarkoni. Ze'evi and Yarkoni had worked together in the IDF. After Yarkoni's death Ze'evi loudly criticised the decision not to bury him in a military cemetery for halakhic reasons.

== Controversies ==
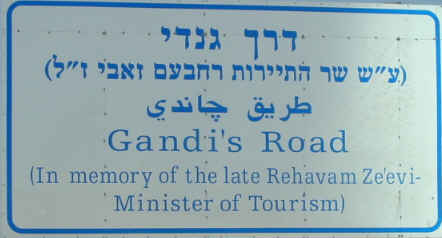
Highway 90 renamed Derekh Gandi

In 1975, Ehud Olmert, who later became Prime Minister of Israel, accused Ze'evi of protecting organized crime figures. Ze'evi sued Olmert for libel but lost the case. In September 1991, while serving as Minister without Portfolio, he called then U.S. President George H. W. Bush an "anti-Semite."

In 1997, he called then U.S. Ambassador to Israel, Martin Indyk a "yehudon" ("jewboy") and challenged him to a fistfight. Indyk responded by calling him a "son of a bitch". The insult was apparently because the ambassador was urging Israel to make concessions in talks with the Palestinians.

A report in 2016 from a television news magazine aired allegations that Ze'evi killed unarmed Bedouins, conspired in an attempted murder of a reporter, and raped a soldier under his command. The publication drew calls for an end to government funding for programs honoring Ze'evi.

== Legacy and commemoration ==
In July 2005, the Knesset passed a law to commemorate Ze'evi's memory. Route 90 was renamed Gandhi's Road in his honor. Eilat's promenade was named for him and there is a life-size statue of him there. The community settlement of Merhav Am and the West Bank settlement Ma'ale Rehav'am also bear his name.

== See also ==
- Arab–Israeli conflict
- History of Israel
- Israel Defense Forces
- Israeli–Palestinian conflict
- List of assassinated people
- Palestinian political violence
- Politics of Israel
- Zionism
- Israeli casualties of war
