= George Habash =

Founder of the Popular Front for the Liberation of Palestine (1926–2008)

- جورج حبش
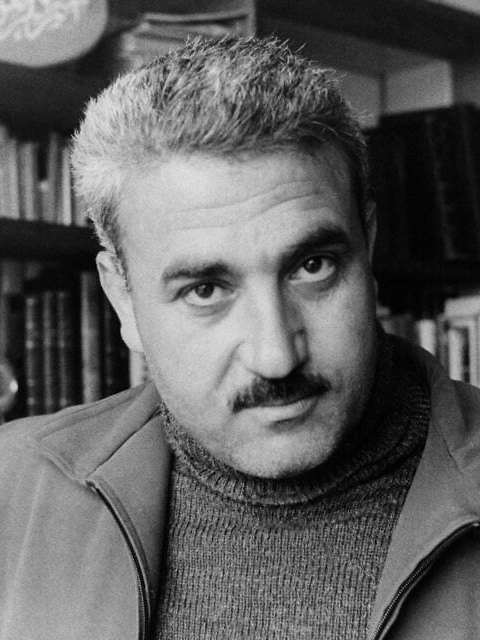
- Habash c. 1969

General Secretary of the Popular Front for the Liberation of Palestine
- In office December 1967 – July 2000
- Preceded by: Office established
- Succeeded by: Abu Ali Mustafa

Personal details
- Born: 1 August 1926 Lydda, Mandatory Palestine
- Died: 26 January 2008 (aged 81) Amman, Jordan
- Party: Popular Front for the Liberation of Palestine
- Other political affiliations: Arab Nationalist Movement (1951–1967)
- Education: American University of Beirut
- Religious background: Greek Orthodox Christian

George Habash (Note: Arabic: جورج حبش, romanized: Jūrj Ḥabash) (1 August 1926 – 26 January 2008) was a Palestinian politician and physician who was the founder and first general-secretary of the Popular Front for the Liberation of Palestine (PFLP) from 1967 to 2000.

Habash was born in Lydda, Mandatory Palestine, in 1926. In 1948, while he was a medical student at the American University of Beirut, he returned to his hometown of Lydda during the 1948 Arab–Israeli War. The city's Arab Palestinian population, including his family, was forcibly driven out in an event known as the Lydda Death March, which led to the death of his sister. In 1951, after graduating first in his class from medical school, Habash worked in Palestinian refugee camps in Jordan and ran a clinic in Amman. He later relocated to Syria and Lebanon.

In 1967, after being sidelined in the Palestine Liberation Organization (PLO) by Yasser Arafat, he founded the Popular Front for the Liberation of Palestine, a Marxist–Leninist group opposing the existence of Israel and advocating for a one-state solution in the entire region. In the 1970 Dawson's Field hijackings, Habash masterminded the hijackings of four Western airliners to Jordan, which led to the Black September conflict and his subsequent exile to Lebanon. Habash remained opposed to a two-state solution even after the PLO signed the Oslo Peace Accords in 1993. He resigned as secretary-general of the PFLP due to ill health in 2000, dying of a heart attack in 2008.

He was also known by his laqab as "al-Hakim" (Arabic: الحكيم, romanized: al-Ḥakīm, lit. 'The Wise Man' or 'The Doctor').

== Early life ==
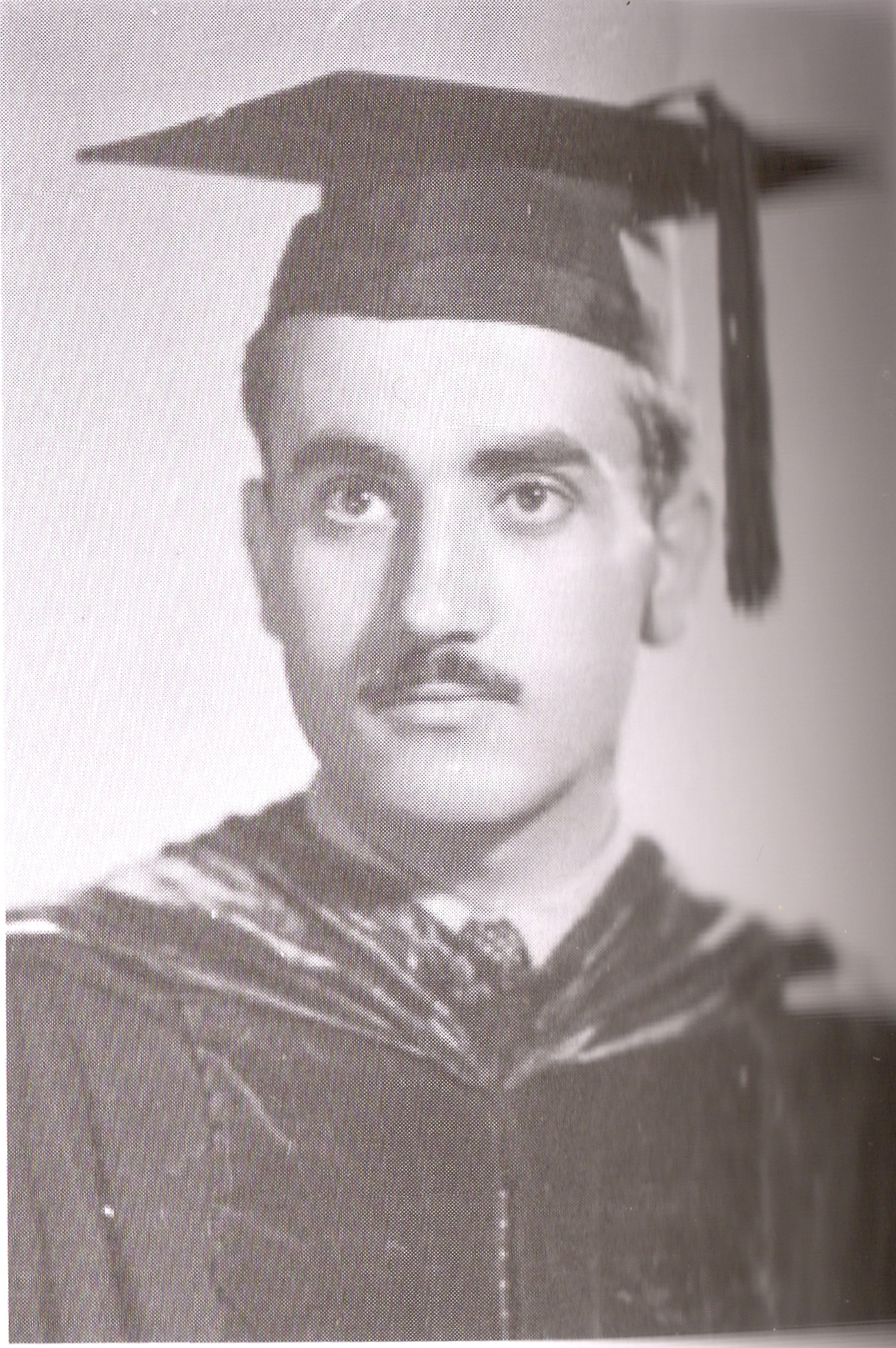
Habash received an undergraduate degree in medicine from the American University of Beirut in 1951

Habash was born in Lydda, Mandatory Palestine to a Greek Orthodox Christian Palestinian family in 1926. As a child, he sang in the church choir. In 1948, 19-year-old Habash, a medical student at the American University of Beirut (AUB), went to his home town of Lydda during the 1948 Arab–Israeli War to help his family. While he was there, the Israel Defense Forces attacked the city and as a result, most of its civilian population was forced to leave in what became known as the Lydda Death March. They marched for three days without food or water until they reached the Arab armies' front lines, which led to his sister's death. Habash and his remaining family became refugees and were not allowed to return home. He later finished his education at the AUB and graduated in 1951.

Political thinkers who were influences on Habash at this period included Constantin Zureiq, whose lectures at AUB on 'Arab nationalism and the Zionist danger' in the late 1940s and early 1950s Habash had attended, and Sati' al-Husri an Arab Muslim intellectual who emphasized national cohesiveness, territorial patriotism, and loyalty to the state, and gave priority to Arab unity over Islamic unity.

In 1951, after graduating first in his class from medical school, Habash worked in refugee camps in Jordan and ran a clinic with Wadie Haddad in Amman. He firmly believed that the state of Israel should be ended by all possible means, including political violence. In an effort to recruit the Arab world to this cause, Habash founded the Arab Nationalist Movement (ANM) in 1951 and aligned the organization with Gamal Abdel Nasser's Arab nationalist ideology.

He was implicated in the 1957 coup attempt in Jordan, which originated among Palestinian members of the National Guard. Habash was convicted in absentia after having gone underground when Hussein of Jordan proclaimed martial law and banned all political parties. In 1958, he fled to Syria (then part of the United Arab Republic [UAR]) but was forced to return to Beirut in 1961 by the tumultuous breakup of the UAR.

Habash was a leading member of the Palestine Liberation Organization until 1967 when he was sidelined by Fatah leader Yasser Arafat, with whom he had a complex relationship described as a mix of "camaraderie and rivalry" and "a love-hate relationship". In response, Habash founded the Popular Front for the Liberation of Palestine.

== Popular Front for the Liberation of Palestine ==
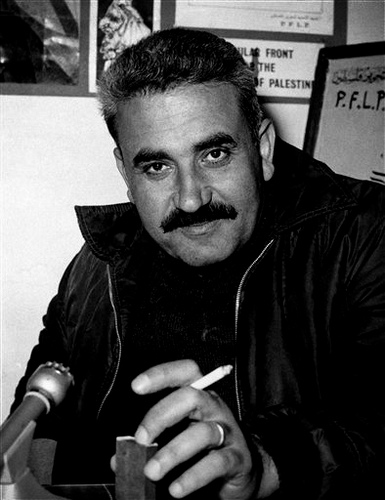
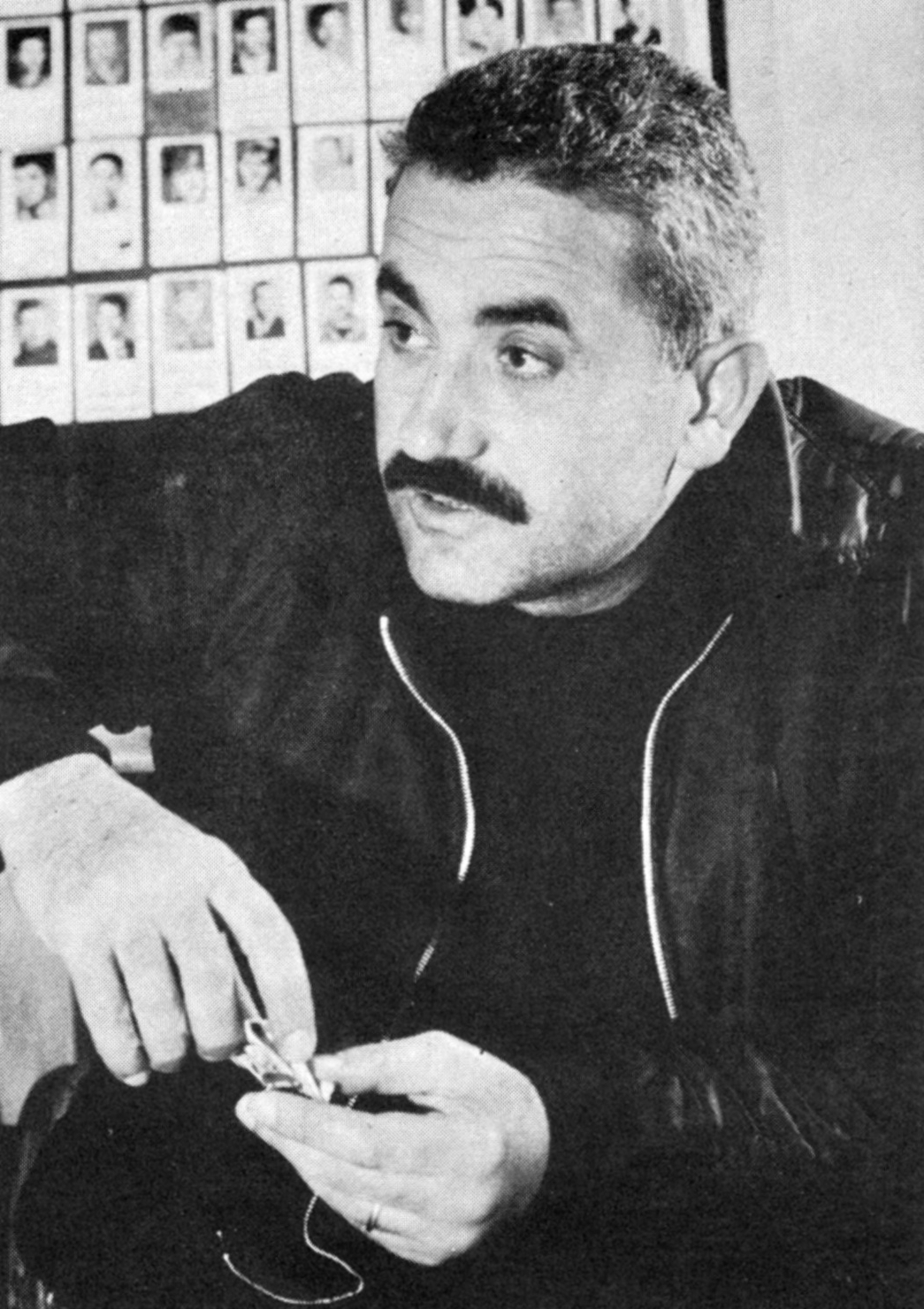
Habash in 1969

In 1964 he began reorganizing the ANM, regrouping the Palestinian members of the organization into a "regional command." After the Six-Day War in 1967, disillusion with Nasser became widespread. This prompted the foundation, led by Habash, of the Popular Front for the Liberation of Palestine (PFLP) as a front of several Palestinian factions, like the "heroes of return" and "Palestinian Liberation Front", along with the ANM on 11 December, when he also became its first secretary-general. Habash was arrested by Abd al-Karim al-Jundi and briefly imprisoned in Syria under the accusation of plotting to overthrow the Baathist ruling party in 1968 but escaped with the help of Wadie Haddad who with four others extracted Habash from a maximum security prison whilst disguised as military police. In the same year, he also came into conflict with long-time ally Wadie Haddad, but both remained in the PFLP.

At a 1969 congress, the PFLP re-designated itself a Marxist movement. Its pan-Arab leanings have been diminished since the ANM days, but popular support for a united Arab front has remained, especially in regard to Israeli and western political pressures. It holds a firm position regarding Israel, demanding its complete eradication as a racist state through military struggle and promotes a one-state solution (one secular, democratic, non-denominational state).

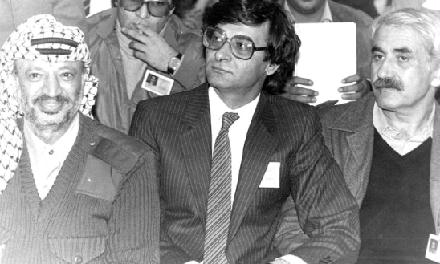
Yasser Arafat, Mahmoud Darwish & George Habash in Syria c. 1980

The 1969 congress also saw an ultra-leftist faction under Nayef Hawatmeh and Yasser Abd Rabbo split off as the Popular Democratic Front for the Liberation of Palestine (PDFLP), later to become the Democratic Front for the Liberation of Palestine (DFLP). During Habash's time as secretary-general, the PFLP became known as one of the most radical and militant Palestinian factions and gained world notoriety after a string of aircraft hijackings and attacks against Israel affiliated companies as well as Israeli ambassadors in Europe mostly planned by Haddad. The PFLP's pioneering of modern international terror operations brought the group, and the Palestinian issue, onto newspaper front pages worldwide, but it also provoked intense criticism from other parts of the Palestine Liberation Organization. In 1970, Habash was evicted from Jordan due to the key role of the Popular Front in the Black September clashes. In 1974, the Palestinian National Council adopted a resolution recognizing a two-state solution to the Israeli–Palestinian conflict and Habash, who opposed this, formed the Rejectionist Front from several other opposition parties.

Habash aligned the PFLP with the PLO and the Lebanese National Movement, but stayed neutral during the Lebanese Civil War in the late 1970s. After a stroke in 1980, when he was living in Damascus, his health declined and other PFLP members rose to the top.

After the Oslo Agreements, Habash formed another opposition alliance of Rejectionists, including Islamist organizations such as Hamas and the Islamic Jihad Movement in Palestine, that became prominent during the First Intifada. In 2000, he resigned from his leadership post of the PFLP due to poor health and was succeeded by Abu Ali Mustafa. He continued to be an activist for the group until 2008 when he died of a heart attack in Amman.

== Black September ==
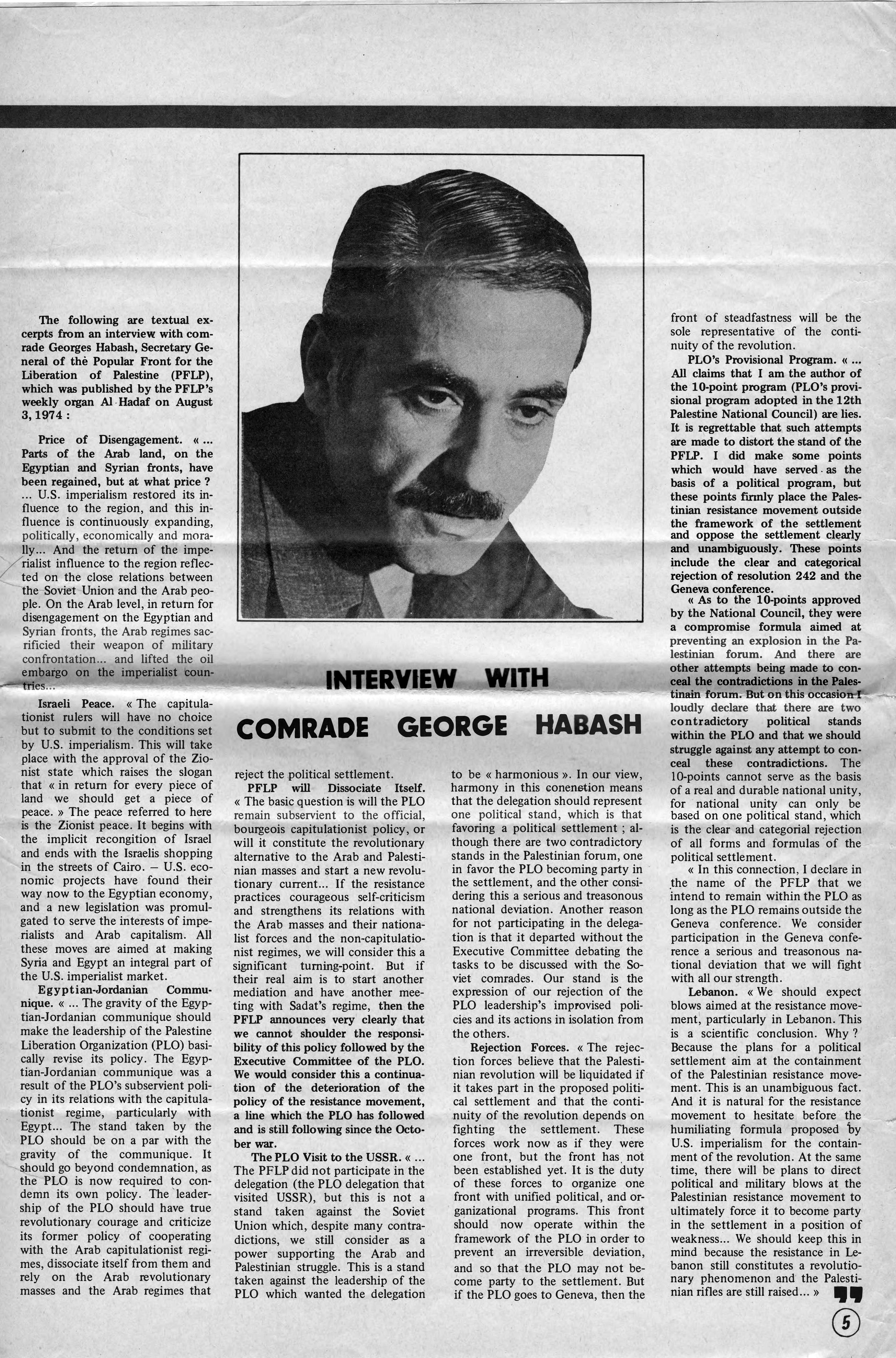
"Interview with Comrade George Habash," published by the PFLP on 3 August 1974

The PFLP ignored tensions with the mainstream leadership of Yasser Arafat's Fatah faction, and instead focused on bringing about revolutionary change in Jordan. Habash expressed the opinion that what proceeded was not "only military but also psychological warfare" and one had to "hold the Israelis under permanent pressure".

In the 1970 Dawson's Field hijackings, Habash masterminded the hijackings of four Western airliners over the United States, Europe, the Far East and the Persian Gulf. The aircraft were forced to fly to a World War II airfield in Jordan, the passengers and crews were disembarked and the planes were then blown up.

The Dawson's Field hijackings were instrumental in provoking the Black September crackdown, which came close to destroying the PLO. The hijackings led Hussein of Jordan to carry out a major offensive against militant strongholds in his kingdom resulting in the deaths of thousands of Palestinians. In autumn 1970, Habash visited Beijing. After Black September, the PLO fedayeen relocated to Lebanon.

In 1972, Habash experienced failing health and gradually began to lose influence within the organization. The Palestinian National Council's (PNC) adoption of a resolution viewed by the PFLP as a two-state solution in 1974, prompted Habash to lead his organization out of active participation in the PLO and to join the Iraqi-backed Rejectionist Front. Only in 1977 would the PFLP opt to rejoin, as the Palestinian factions rallied their forces in opposition to Anwar Sadat's overtures towards Israel, pro-U.S. policies and fragmentation of the Arab world. During the Lebanese Civil War that broke out in 1975, PFLP forces were decimated in the battle against Syria. Later, the PFLP would draw close to Syria, as Syria's government shifted, but PFLP involvement in the Lebanese war remained strong until the US-negotiated evacuation of PLO units from Beirut in 1982 and continued on a smaller scale after that.

== Oslo Agreements ==
After the signing of the Oslo Peace Accords in 1993, Habash and the PFLP again broke completely with Arafat, accusing him of selling out the Palestinian revolution. The group set up an anti-Arafat and anti-Oslo alliance in Damascus, for the first time joined by non-PLO Islamist groups such as Hamas and the Palestinian Islamic Jihad, which had grown to prominence during the First Intifada. After finding the position sterile, with Palestinian political dynamics playing out on the West Bank and Gaza areas of the Palestinian National Authority (PNA), Habash carefully sought to repair ties to Arafat, and gain a hold in post-Oslo politics without compromising PFLP principles. However, there is no indication that he ever accepted the two-state solution. This balancing act could not save the PFLP from being eclipsed by the militant Islamist factions on the one hand, and the resource-rich Fatah with its PNA patronage network on the other. The significance of the PFLP in Palestinian politics has diminished considerably since the mid-90s. The PFLP participated in the Palestinian legislative elections of 2006 as Ahmad Sa'adat won 4.2% of the popular vote.

In the late 1990s, Habash's medical condition worsened. In 2000 he resigned from the post as secretary-general, citing health reasons. He was succeeded as head of the PFLP by Abu Ali Mustafa who was assassinated by Israel during the Second Intifada. Habash went on to set up a PFLP-affiliated research center, but he remained active in the PFLP's internal politics. Until his death he was still popular among many Palestinians, who appreciate his revolutionary ideology, his determination and principles, the rejection of the Oslo Agreements and his intellectual style.

== Death ==
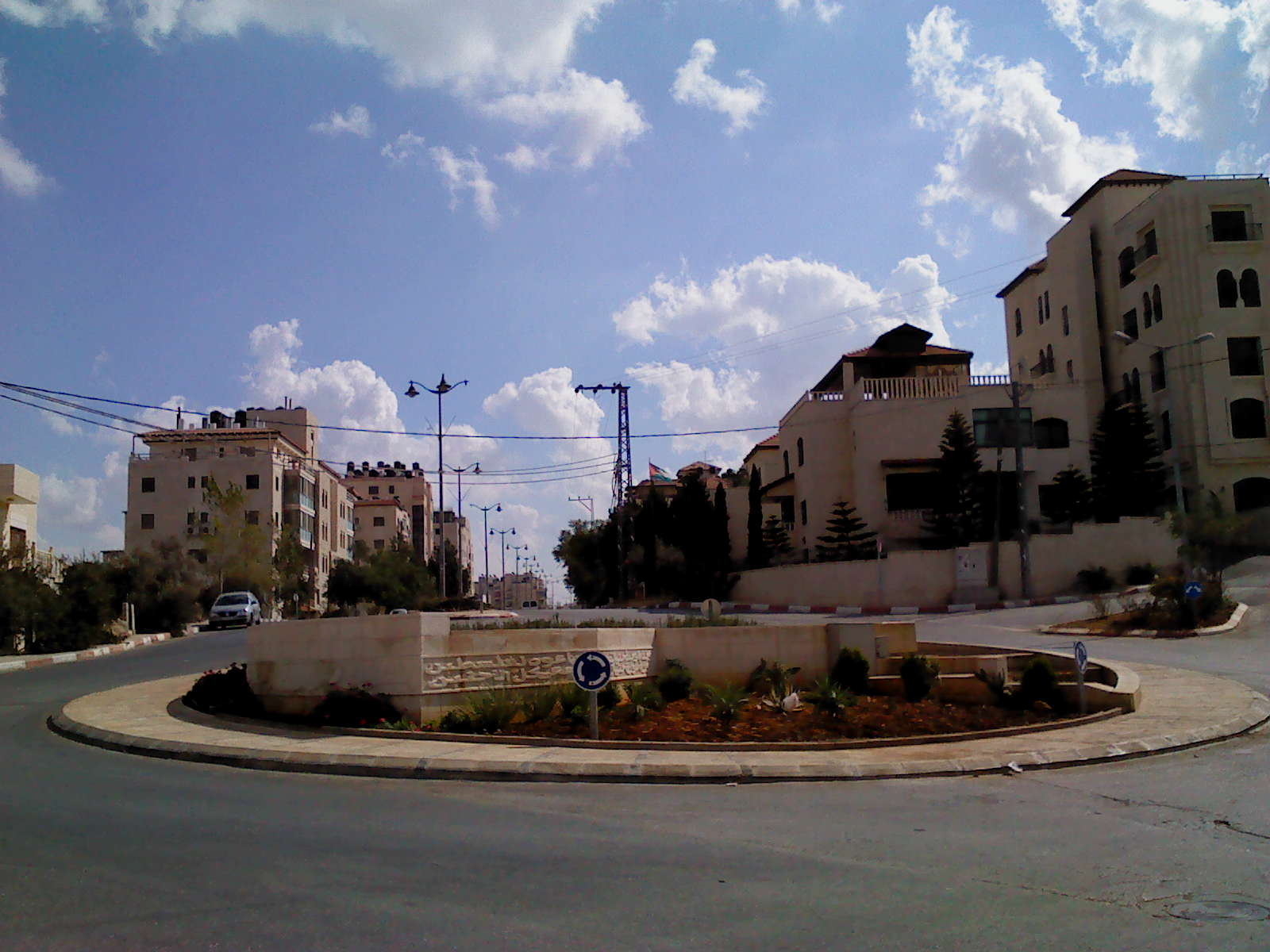
George Habash Square, Ramallah

Habash died on 26 January 2008, at the age of 81 of a heart attack in the Jordan Hospital, Amman, where Habash was a cancer patient. The President of the Palestinian National Authority, Mahmoud Abbas, called for three days of national mourning. Habash was buried in a suburban cemetery of Amman with the obsequies of the Eastern Orthodox Church. Abbas said Habash was a "historic leader" and called for Palestinian flags to be flown half-mast. Abdel Raheem Mallouh, PFLP deputy secretary-general, called Habash a "distinguished leader... who struggled for more than 60 years without a stop for the rights and the interests of his people". Hamas leader and dismissed Palestinian Prime Minister Ismail Haniyeh sent his condolences, saying Habash "spent his life defending Palestine".
