= Hamdi Quran =

Palestinian assassin

- حمدي قرعان

Member of the Popular Front for the Liberation of Palestine

Personal details
- Party: Popular Front for the Liberation of Palestine
- Parent: d. 2014 (mother)
- Militant Wing: Abu Ali Mustafa Brigades; Then called the "Red Eagle Brigades"

Hamdi Quran (Arabic: حمدي قرعان) is a member of the Popular Front for the Liberation of Palestine (PFLP). He was one of a four-man PFLP team who, on 17 October 2001 assassinated Rehavam Ze'evi, the founder of the right-wing Moledet party, who mainly advocated for "population transfer".

In 2002, Quran was sentenced by the Palestinian National Authority to 18 years for the crime and imprisoned in a Jericho prison under the supervision of British and American wardens under a deal worked out between US President, George W. Bush and Israeli Prime Minister, Ariel Sharon, in April 2002.

== Hamas release attempt and Israeli capture ==
In early 2006, the newly elected Hamas government announced its intention to release Ze'evi's assassins. The US and British supervisors guarding the Palestinian prisoners in Jericho prison were removed due to safety concerns on 14 March 2006, and on the same day the Israel Defense Forces besieged the prison in Operation Bringing Home the Goods, taking Quran and five other security prisoners into Israeli custody. Quran was sentenced by an Israeli court to life imprisonment for the Zeevi assassination, and was given 100 years for other shootings and bombings against Israelis.

== Family ==
In December 2014, his mother died while he was in prison.

== Depiction in arts and media ==
Quran features prominently in a PFLP song about the assassination Arabic: 17 أكتوبر زغرد كاتم الصوت, lit. '"On the 17th of October, the silencer spoke"' often shortened to Arabic: 17 أكتوبر, lit. '"October 17"' and a short documentary video the party media office made about the assassination.
