= Abu Ali Mustafa Brigades =

Armed wing of the Popular Front for the Liberation of Palestine

Abu Ali Mustafa Brigades كتائب الشهيد أبو علي مصطفى Katāʾib Abū ʿAlī Muṣṭafā
- Leaders: Ahmad Sa'adat; Abu Jamal (spokesperson)
- Dates active: 1967–present
- Active regions: West Bank; Gaza Strip; Israel; Lebanon; Syria
- Ideology: Communism; Marxism–Leninism; Guevarism; Foco theory; Revolutionary socialism; Palestinian nationalism; Anti-Zionism; Secularism
- Size: Unknown
- Part of: Popular Front for the Liberation of Palestine; Palestinian Joint Operations Room
- Wars: War of Attrition; Black September; Lebanese Civil War; First Intifada; Second Intifada; Gaza War (2008–2009); 2012 Gaza conflict 2014 Gaza war 2021 Conflict; 2023–2025 Gaza war 2024 Israeli invasion of Lebanon
- Website: www.abuali.ps

The Brigades of the Martyr Abu Ali Mustafa (Arabic: كتائب الشهيد أبو علي مصطفى, romanized: Katāʾib ash-Shahīd Abū ʿAlī Muṣṭafā) are the armed wing of the Marxist–Leninist Popular Front for the Liberation of Palestine (PFLP) in the Palestinian territories (the West Bank, Gaza and East Jerusalem). It was named after Mustafa Ali Zabri, better known by his kunya Abu Ali Mustafa.

== Personnel ==
- Abu Jamal (Arabic: أبو جمال, romanized: Abū Jamāl) is the kunya (nom de guerre) of a Palestinian militant commander who is the spokesperson for the organization.
- Nader Sadaqa (Arabic: نادر صدقة, romanized: Nadir Sadaqatan) is a Samaritan from Mount Gerizim who served as the commander of the brigade after joining the PFLP in 2000. He was arrested by Israeli forces in August 2004 during the Second Intifada and was sentenced to six life sentences as well as 45 years in prison by an Israeli court. In October 2025, he was released from prison as part of a prisoner exchange during the Gaza peace plan.

== History ==
Originally named the Red Eagle Brigade (Arabic: كتائب النسر الأحمر, romanized: Katā’ib al-Nasr al-Aḥmar), they were renamed in 2001 after Abu Ali Mustafa, PFLP's leader, who was killed by Israel in August 2001. They were active with attacks on both military and civilian Israeli targets during the al-Aqsa Intifada.

On 16 July 2007, Palestinian president Mahmoud Abbas requested that all Palestinian resistance groups relinquish their weapons to the Palestinian Authority. Although several members of Fatah's armed wing Al-Aqsa Martyrs' Brigades complied, the Abu Ali Mustafa Brigades rejected this, stating that they will not cease their resistance until the Israelis withdraw from all parts of the West Bank and the Gaza Strip.

The Abu Ali Mustafa Brigades fought in the 2021 Israel–Palestine crisis.

=== Attacks carried out by the Brigades ===
The PFLP's Abu Ali Mustafa Brigades has carried out attacks on both civilians and military targets during the Al-Aqsa Intifada. Some of these attacks are:

- The killing of Meir Lixenberg, councilor and head of security in four settlements, who was shot while traveling in his car in the West Bank on 27 August 2001.
- The 17 October 2001 assassination of right-wing Israeli politician and Israeli Minister for Tourism Rehavam Zeevi, the only Israeli politician to have been assassinated in the Al-Aqsa Intifada.
- A suicide bombing in a pizzeria in Karnei Shomron in the West Bank, on 16 February 2002, killing three Israelis.
- A suicide bombing in Ariel on 7 March 2002, which left wounded but no fatalities.
- A suicide bombing in a Netanya market in Israel, on 19 May 2002, killing three Israelis. This attack was also claimed by Hamas, but the Abu Ali Mustafa Brigades have identified the perpetrator on their website as one of their members.
- A suicide bombing in the bus station at Geha Junction in Petah Tikva on 25 December 2003 which killed 4 Israelis.
- A suicide bombing in Bik'at HaYarden Regional Council on 22 May 2004, which left no fatalities.
- A suicide bombing in the Carmel Market in Tel Aviv on 1 November 2004, which killed 3 Israelis.
- The killing of four Israelis and another eight injured at a synagogue in West Jerusalem on 18 November 2014.
- A rocket attack which struck Sha'ar HaNegev, on 26 June 2017, caused no injuries or damage.
- Murder of Rina Shnerb, August 23, 2019.
- During the ongoing Gaza war (2023–present), the Abu Ali Mustafa Brigades published videos of their fighters storming Israeli watchtowers during the Hamas-led October 7 attacks, and are actively participating in the conflict.

== Capabilities ==
According to the CIA World Factbook, the exact strength of the Abu Ali Mustafa Brigades is unknown, but in the thousands. Its known weaponry includes small arms, light machine guns, rocket artillery, mortars, man-portable surface-to-air missiles, improvised weapons, and explosives, including IEDs, and suicide vests.

The Brigades also produces its own weaponry alongside smuggling and importing it. These include IEDs, mortars, RPGs, and rockets, alongside others. The Samoud-1 (literally "resilience") is a relatively short range (8–12 km) rocket domestically produced by Abu Ali Mustafa Brigades in the Gaza Strip. RPGs used include domestically produced Yasin RPGs, whether these were solely given to the PFLP by Hamas, or if the PFLP can also produce Yasin RPGs is unclear.

The Sariya-1 240mm Mortar is also produced locally by the PFLP, alongside the mortar ammunition. The military doctrine and tactics of the Abu Ali Mustafa brigades preference mortars heavily, even more so than other armed groups. The brigades regularly publishes videos of them bombarding Israeli positions with mortars. In an interview given to the Los Angeles Times Abu Jamal, the spokesman of the brigades made the following statement:

The advantage of the mortar is that the enemy can never protect himself from it. This is not an exceptionally accurate weapon, but that is not important to us. Even if the mortar does not hit the target, we want to cause confusion and panic.

== Foreign support ==
The PFLP, and by extension the Abu Ali Mustafa Brigades, receive military and financial support by Iran. This relationship probably began around 2013, and although the actual extent of this support is unclear, the PFLP and Abu Ali Mustafa Brigades have repeatedly declared themselves allies of Iran, Syria and the Axis of Resistance.

== See also ==
- Palestinian Joint Operations Room
- Democratic Front for the Liberation of Palestine
- Revolutionary People's Liberation Party/Front
- Syrian Resistance
- List of military units named after people
