= Jamil Mezher =

Palestinian politician

- جميل مزهر

Deputy General Secretary of the Popular Front for the Liberation of Palestine
- Incumbent
- Assumed office May 2022

Personal details
- Born: 16 July 1964 (age 61) Nuseirat, Egyptian Gaza Strip
- Party: Popular Front for the Liberation of Palestine

Jamil Saleh Abdullah Mezher (also transliterated from Arabic as Mazhar; Arabic: جميل صالح عبد الله مزهر; born 16 July 1964) is a Palestinian socialist militant and the Deputy Secretary-General of the Popular Front for the Liberation of Palestine (PFLP), a Marxist–Leninist Palestinian nationalist organisation, since 2022.

== Biography ==
Mezher was born in Gaza in 1964, to a family of refugees that settled in the Nuseirat refugee camp. He joined the PFLP in 1980, when he was 16 years old. He holds a bachelor's degree in administration.

For his activities he was detained by Israeli forces twice, once in 1989, and once in 1992. He began rising through the ranks, and especially following the Gaza Civil War between Fatah and Hamas, he became a key part of restructuring the Front's administrative, political and organizational system in the Gaza Strip. The PFLP at this time especially in Gaza fell into complete disarray and lost relevance; however, Mezher and others managed to cause a "renaissance" of the PFLP in Gaza by laying the foundations of the Front's organization and solidifying its structure. He eventually became the head of the PFLP in the Gaza Strip.

During the Gaza war of 2008–2009, he was the subject of an Israeli assassination attempt at Nuseirat where his home was targeted, which he survived. He played a key part in organizing and establishing several civil societies and charities with leftist and progressive natures. During the Eighth National Congress of the Popular Front in May 2022, he was elected as the Deputy Secretary-General of the PFLP. He played an important role in organizing the PFLP in preparation for, and following the start of the Gaza war, and he left the strip a month before its start, for Syria.
