= Abu Ali Mustafa =

Palestinian militant and politician (1938–2001)

Abu Ali Mustafa أبو علي مصطفى

General Secretary of the Popular Front for the Liberation of Palestine
- In office July 2000 – 27 August 2001
- Preceded by: George Habash
- Succeeded by: Ahmad Sa'adat

Personal details
- Born: Mustafa Ali Zabri مصطفى علي الزبري; 14 May 1938 Arraba, Jenin, Mandatory Palestine
- Died: 27 August 2001 (aged 63) Al-Bireh, West Bank, Palestine
- Party: Popular Front for the Liberation of Palestine (PFLP)
- Other political affiliations: Arab Nationalist Movement (1955–1967)

Mustafa Ali Zabri (Arabic: مصطفى علي الزبري; 14 May 1938 – 27 August 2001), better known by his kunya Abu Ali Mustafa (/ˈɑːbuː ˈɑːli ˈmuːstəfə/; Arabic: أبو علي مصطفى) and also known as Mustafa Alhaj, was a Palestinian militant who served as the General Secretary of the Popular Front for the Liberation of Palestine (PFLP) from July 2000 until he was assassinated by Israeli forces in a targeted killing on 27 August 2001. Mustafa was succeeded as Secretary General by Ahmad Saadat, and the PFLP subsequently renamed their armed wing in the Palestinian territories the Abu Ali Mustafa Brigades.

== Biography ==
Mustafa Zabri was born in 1938, in the northern West Bank town of Arrabah, the son of a farmer. In 1955 he joined the Arab Nationalist Movement (ANM), and two years later was arrested by the Jordanian authorities for his political activities. After his release at the end of 1961, he resumed his activities in the ANM and was put in charge of the movement in the northern West Bank. Following the Israel Defense Forces' capture of the West Bank in the Six-Day War, he left the West Bank and spent 32 years mainly in Damascus and Jordan.

Mustafa joined George Habash and other left-wing members of the ANM in establishing the Marxist–Leninist Popular Front for the Liberation of Palestine in 1967, and became a leading member of the new organization. He was also a prominent member of the Palestine Liberation Organisation, rising to become a member of its ruling Executive Committee. He was for a long time deputy to Habash's leadership of the PFLP.

In September 1999 he returned to the West Bank under a deal struck between Yasser Arafat and Israel's Prime Minister, Ehud Barak. In July 2000 he was elected as the new general secretary of the PFLP after Habash retired. The PFLP is designated a terrorist organization by Israel and many western states. Israel held Mustafa personally responsible for 10 different car-bomb attacks undertaken by the PFLP during his time as general secretary (in Jerusalem, Or Yehuda, Yehud, and Haifa) and other shootings.

== Assassination ==
Funeral of Abu Ali Mustafa
- "Thousands attend funeral of PFLP official Mustafa Zibri". www.youtube.com/@APArchive. AP Archive.
- m.youtube.com

Mustafa was killed by two rockets fired from two Israeli Apache helicopters through his two office windows, as he sat at his desk in his office in Al-Bireh city, in a targeted killing on 27 August 2001.

Thousands of mourners attended his funeral. Associated Press said, "Marching in the Ramallah funeral procession were the leaders of Palestinian factions that have been riven by rivalries in the past". The mourners included ministers from Yasser Arafat's Cabinet, other members of the Palestinian legislature, and high-ranking representatives of radical groups including Hamas and Islamic Jihad.

In an interview with Al Jazeera shortly before his death, Mustafa repeated his belief that the Palestinian people have the right to struggle using all means, including the armed struggle. Asked about the risk of targeted killing at Israeli hands he said: "We all are targeted as soon as we begin to be mobilised. We do our best to avoid their guns, but we are living under the brutal Zionist occupation of our lands, and its army is only a few metres away from us. Of course we must be cautious, but we have work to do, and nothing will stop us." He also rejected anything less than Israel's "destruction", saying "we do not make deals or truces with Israel."

Israeli tourist minister Rehavam Ze'evi, leader of the far-right nationalist Moledet party, was subsequently assassinated on 17 October 2001 by PFLP member Hamdi Quran in revenge for Israel's killing of Mustafa. Ze'evi had been a strong supporter of Israel carrying out targeted killing of Palestinian militants. The Guardian described Ze'evi as an advocate of the ethnic cleansing of Palestinians from the West Bank and Gaza, a policy he called "transfer".
