= Popular Front for the Liberation of Palestine =

Palestinian Marxist–Leninist organization

Popular Front for the Liberation of Palestine الجبهة الشعبية لتحرير فلسطين
- General Secretary: Ahmad Sa'adat (imprisoned)
- Deputy General Secretary: Jamil Mezher
- Founder: George Habash
- Founded: 1967; 59 years ago
- Headquarters: Damascus, Syria
- Paramilitary wing: Abu Ali Mustafa Brigades
- Ideology: Communism; Marxism–Leninism; Revolutionary socialism; Palestinian nationalism; Secularism; Anti-imperialism; Anti-Zionism; Pan-Arabism; Arab nationalism; One-state solution
- Political position: Left-wing to far-left
- National affiliation: Palestine Liberation Organization; Democratic Alliance List
- International affiliation: International Communist Seminar (defunct)
- Legislative Council (2006, defunct): 3 / 132

Party flag

Website
- www.pflp.ps

The Popular Front for the Liberation of Palestine (PFLP; Arabic: الجبهة الشعبية لتحرير فلسطين, romanized: al-Jabha ash-Shaʿbiyya li-Taḥrīr Filasṭīn) is a Palestinian Marxist–Leninist organization founded in 1967 by George Habash. It has consistently been the second-largest of the groups forming the Palestine Liberation Organization (PLO), the largest being Fatah.

A secular organization, the PFLP has generally taken a hard line on Palestinian national aspirations, opposing the more moderate stance of Fatah. It does not recognize Israel and promotes a one-state solution to the Israeli–Palestinian conflict. The military wing of the PFLP is called the Abu Ali Mustafa Brigades.

Ahmad Sa'adat, who was sentenced in 2006 to 30 years in an Israeli prison, has served as General Secretary of the PFLP since 2001. As of 2025, the PFLP has boycotted participation in both the PLO Executive Committee and the Palestinian National Council.

The PFLP pioneered armed aircraft-hijackings in the late 1960s and early 1970s. More recently, the group has participated in the ongoing Gaza war alongside Hamas and other allied Palestinian factions. It has been designated a terrorist organization by the United States, Japan, Canada and the European Union.

== Background ==
=== Arab Nationalist Movement ===
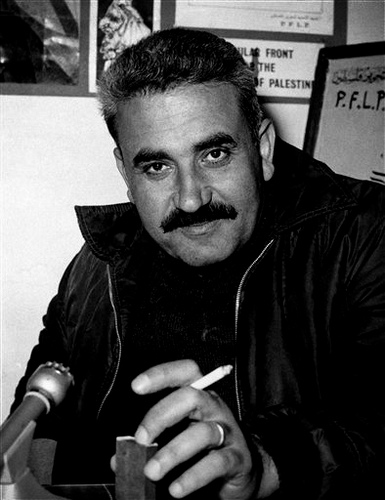
George Habash, a Palestinian Christian, was PFLP's Secretary General at its beginning. He had been influenced by the ideas of Constantin Zureiq and Sati' al-Husri, Arab nationalists of the 1940s and 1950s.

The PFLP grew out of the Harakat al-Qawmiyyin al-Arab, or Arab Nationalist Movement (ANM), founded in 1953 by George Habash, a Palestinian Christian from Lydda. In 1948, 19-year-old Habash, a medical student, went to his home town of Lydda during the 1948 Arab–Israeli War to help his family. While he was there, the Israel Defense Forces attacked the city and forced most of its civilian population to leave in what became known as the Lydda Death March. They marched for three days without food or water until they reached the Arab armies' front lines, leading to the death of his sister. Habash finished his medical education in Lebanon at the American University in Beirut, graduating in 1951.

In an interview with US journalist John K. Cooley, Habash argued for viewing "the liberation of Palestine as something not to be isolated from events in the rest of the Arab world" and identified "the main reason for [Palestinians'] defeat" as triumph of "the scientific society of Israel" over "our own backwardness in the Arab world"; because of this, he "called for the total rebuilding of Arab society into a twentieth-century society" and a "scientific and technical renaissance in the Arab world". The ANM was founded in this nationalist spirit. "[We] held the 'Guevara view' of the 'revolutionary human being'", Habash told Cooley. "A new breed of man had to emerge, among the Arabs as everywhere else. This meant applying everything in human power to the realization of a cause."

==== The ANM moves toward armed struggle ====
From 1962 to 1965, more than 145 ANM members, including Haddad, were trained in the Egyptian army's commando school at Inshas. Egypt also supplied the ANM in Lebanon with small amounts of arms and explosives.

In late 1963 the ANM leadership established the Palestinian Action Command (PAC), an internal military organisation with nominal authority over the ANM's Palestinian members, wherever they were based. The PAC's formation was opposed by the ANM's leftist faction, who were mostly non-Palestinian.

After Gamal Abdel Nasser refused to take command of a region-wide coalition of revolutionary forces incorporating the ANM, the ANM decided to initiate preparations for armed struggle, and the PAC's name was changed to Revenge Youth Organisation (RYO).) (RYO is not to be confused with Revenge Youth, a clandestine military unit founded by the Muslim Brotherhood in Gaza in the 1950s.)

According to historian Yezid Sayigh, a three-way balance emerged within the ANM, "in which the old guard headed by Habash and Hindi relied on the Palestinian constituency to counter the Left, but at the same time sought to contain pressures for military action against Israel.")

In collaboration with the Palestine Liberation Organisation's (PLO) Palestinian Liberation Army (PLA), the ANM established the Abtal al-Audah (Heroes of Return) commando group in early summer 1966. The ANM exercised de facto control, unbeknownst to the PLO, which funded the outfit. Heroes of Return conducted its first operation inside Israel on 19 October, which was launched from Lebanon. Israel responded with a raid into Lebanon, in which its forces dynamited 118 houses. Heroes of Return proceeded to launch a further seven raids from the Jordan-occupied West Bank before the June 1967 war.

== History ==
=== Formation of the PFLP ===
After the Six-Day War of June 1967, ANM initiated discussions with other Palestinian groups concerning the announcement of a united front organisation. Included within the discussions, as well as the ANM (including the RYO), were Heroes of Return (officially a collaboration with the PLO but actually under ANM control), Ahmed Jibril's Syria-based Palestinian Liberation Front, and a group of Jordanian Nasserists led by the former army officer Ahmed Za'rur. These groups combined to form the Popular Front for the Liberation of Palestine (PFLP) which was announced to the public on 11 December 1967, to coincide with a planned attack on Ben Gurion Airport in Lydda, which was a failure.

By early 1968, the PFLP had trained between one and three thousand guerrillas. It had the financial backing of Syria, and was headquartered there, and one of its training camps was based in as-Salt, Jordan. In 1969, the PFLP declared itself a Marxist–Leninist organization, but it has remained faithful to Pan-Arabism, seeing the Palestinian struggle as part of a wider uprising against Western imperialism, which also aims to unite the Arab world by overthrowing "reactionary" regimes. It published a magazine, al-Hadaf (The Target, or Goal), which was edited by Ghassan Kanafani.

=== Operations ===
The PFLP gained notoriety in the late 1960s and early 1970s for a series of armed attacks and aircraft hijackings, including on non-Israeli targets. Abu Ali Mustafa Brigades also claimed responsibility for several suicide attacks during the Al-Aqsa Intifada.

=== Breakaway organizations ===
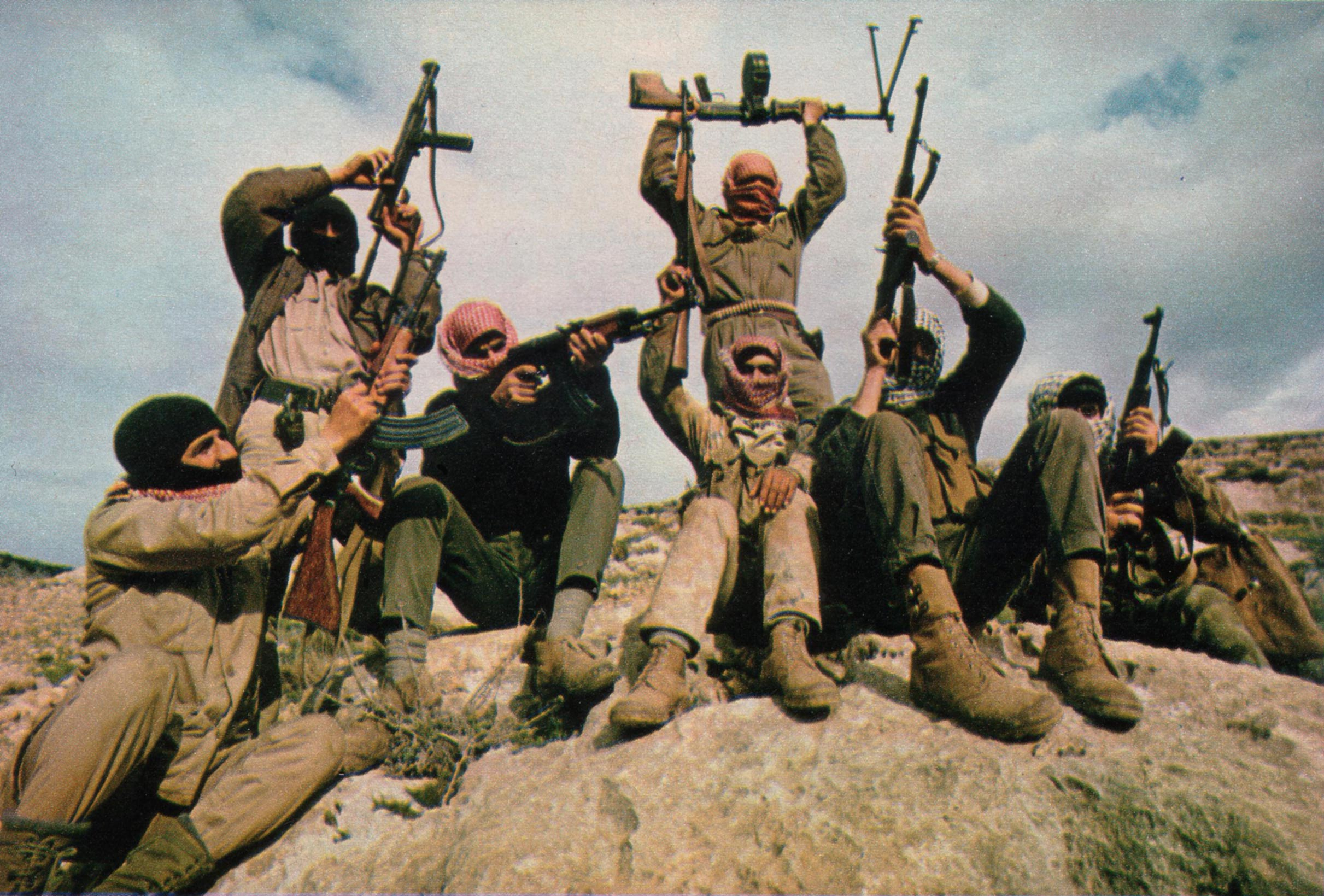
A PFLP patrol in Jordan, 1969

In 1967, Palestinian Popular Struggle Front (PPSF) broke away from the PFLP.

In October 1968, Ahmed Jibril led a breakaway from the PFLP to form the Popular Front for the Liberation of Palestine – General Command (PFLP-GC), and was joined by Ahmed Zarur and his followers. The PFLP-GC took with them around 100 to 200 guerrillas, accounting for around one quarter of the PFLP's armed strength, and Jibril's old Palestinian Liberation Front base near Damascus. Zarur later split from the PFLP-GC to form the Arab Palestine Organisation.

In 1969, the Democratic Front for the Liberation of Palestine (DFLP) formed as a separate, ostensibly Maoist, organization under Nayef Hawatmeh and Yasser Abd Rabbo, initially as the PDFLP.

In 1972, the Popular Revolutionary Front for the Liberation of Palestine was formed following a split in PFLP.

The PFLP had a troubled relationship with George Habash's one-time deputy, Wadie Haddad, who was eventually expelled because he refused orders to cease engaging in hijacking operations abroad. Haddad has been identified in released Soviet archival documents as having been a KGB intelligence agent in place, who in 1975 received arms for the movement directly from Soviet sources in a nighttime transfer in the Sea of Aden.

=== PLO membership ===
The PFLP joined the Palestine Liberation Organization (PLO), the umbrella organization of the Palestinian national movement, in 1968, becoming the second-largest faction after Yasser Arafat's Fatah. In 1974, it withdrew from the PLO Executive Committee (but not from the PLO) to join the Rejectionist Front following the creation of the PLO's Ten Point Program, accusing the PLO of abandoning the goal of destroying Israel outright in favor of a binational solution, which was opposed by the PFLP leadership. It rejoined the executive committee in 1981.

In December 1993 PFLP withdrew from the PLO and became one of the ten founding members of the Damascus-based Alliance of Palestinian Forces, eight of which had been members of the PLO, which was opposed to the Oslo Accords process. PFLP withdrew from APF in 1998. Currently, the PFLP is boycotting participation in the PLO Executive Committee and the Palestinian National Council.

In December 2009, around 70,000 supporters demonstrated in Gaza to celebrate the PFLP's 42nd anniversary.

=== After the Oslo Accords ===
After the occurrence of the First Intifada and the subsequent Oslo Accords the PFLP had difficulty establishing itself in the West Bank and Gaza Strip. At that time (1993–1996) the popularity of Hamas was rapidly increasing due to their successful strategy of suicide bombings devised by Yahya Ayyash ("the Engineer"). The dissolution of the Soviet Union together with the rise of Islamism—and particularly the increased popularity of the Islamist groups Hamas and Palestinian Islamic Jihad – disoriented many left activists who had looked towards the Soviet Union, and has marginalized the PFLP's role in Palestinian politics and armed resistance. However, the organization retains considerable political influence within the PLO, since no new elections have been held for the organization's legislative body, the PNC.

The PFLP developed contacts at this time with Islamic fundamentalist groups linked to Iran – both Palestinian Hamas, and the Lebanon-based Hezbollah. The PLO's agreement with Israel in September 1993, and negotiations which followed, further isolated it from the umbrella organization and led it to conclude a formal alliance with the Iranian backed groups.

As a result of its post-Oslo weakness, the PFLP has been forced to adapt slowly and find partners among politically active, preferably young, Palestinians in the West Bank and Gaza, in order to compensate for their dependence on their aging commanders returning from or remaining in exile. The PFLP has therefore formed alliances with other leftist groups formed within the Palestinian Authority, including the Palestinian People's Party and the Popular Resistance Committees of Gaza.

In 1990, the PFLP transformed its Jordan branch into a separate political party, the Jordanian Popular Democratic Unity Party. From its foundation, the PFLP sought superpower patrons, early on developing ties with the Soviet Union, the People's Republic of China, and, at various times, with regional powers such as Syria, South Yemen, Libya, North Korea, and Iraq, as well as with left-wing groups around the world, including the FARC and the Japanese Red Army. When that support diminished or stopped, in the late 1980s and 1990s, the PFLP sought new allies and developed contacts with Islamist groups linked to Iran, despite the PFLP's strong adherence to secularism and anti-clericalism. The relationship between the PFLP and the Islamic Republic of Iran has fluctuated – it strengthened as a result of Hamas moving away from Iran due to differing positions on the Syrian Civil War. Iran rewarded the PFLP for its pro-Assad stance with an increase in financial and military assistance. The PFLP has been accused by Israel of diverting European humanitarian aid from Palestinian NGOs to itself.

=== Elections in the Palestinian Authority ===
Following the death of Yasser Arafat in November 2004, the PFLP entered discussions with the DFLP and the Palestinian People's Party aimed at nominating a joint left-wing candidate for the Palestinian presidential election to be held on 9 January 2005. These discussions were unsuccessful, so the PFLP decided to support the independent Palestinian National Initiative's candidate Mustafa Barghouti, who gained 19.48% of the vote.

In the municipal elections of December 2005 it had more success, e.g. in al-Bireh and Ramallah, and winning the mayorship of Bir Zeit. There are conflicting reports about the political allegiance of Janet Mikhail and Victor Batarseh, the mayors of Ramallah and Bethlehem; they may be close to the PFLP without being members.

The PFLP participated in the Palestinian legislative elections of 2006 as the "Martyr Abu Ali Mustafa List". It won 4.2% of the popular vote, winning three of the 132 seats in the Palestinian Legislative Council. Its deputies are Ahmad Sa'adat, Jamil Majdalawi, and Khalida Jarrar. In the lists, its best vote was 9.4% in Bethlehem, followed by 6.6% in Ramallah and al-Bireh, and 6.5% in North Gaza. Sa'adat was sentenced in December 2006 to 30 years in an Israeli prison.

=== Successors to George Habash ===
At the PFLP's Sixth National Conference in 2000, Habash stepped down as General Secretary. Abu Ali Mustafa was elected to replace him, but was assassinated on 27 August 2001 when an Israeli helicopter fired rockets at his office in the West Bank town of Ramallah.

After Mustafa's death, the Central Committee of the PFLP on 3 October 2001 elected Ahmad Sa'adat as General Secretary. He has held that position, though since 2002 he has been incarcerated in Palestinian and Israeli prisons.

Sa'adat was re-elected as Secretary-General in 2022. Jamil Mezher was named as deputy leader.

== Attitude to the peace process ==
The PFLP platform never compromised on key points such as the overthrow of conservative or monarchist Arab states like Morocco and Jordan, the Right of Return of all Palestinian refugees to their homes in pre-1948 Palestine, or the use of the liberation of Palestine as an impetus for achieving Arab unity – reflecting its beginnings in the Pan-Arab ANM. It opposed the Oslo Accords and was for a long time opposed to the idea of a two-state solution to the Israeli–Palestinian conflict, but in 1999 came to an agreement with the PLO leadership regarding negotiations with the Israeli government. However, in May 2010, PFLP general secretary Ahmad Sa'adat called for an end to the PLO's negotiations with Israel, saying that only a one-state solution was possible.

In January 2011, the PFLP declared that the Camp David Accords stood for "subservience, submission, dictatorship and silence", and called for social and political revolution in Egypt.

In December 2013, the PFLP stated: "Hamas is a vital part of the Palestinian national movement, and this is the position of the PFLP."

== Armed attacks ==
=== Armed attacks before 2000 ===
The PFLP gained notoriety in the late 1960s and early 1970s for a series of armed attacks and aircraft hijackings, including on non-Israeli targets:

- The hijacking of El Al Flight 426 from Rome to Lod airport in Israel on 23 July 1968. The Western media reported that the flight was targeted because the PFLP believed Israeli general Yitzhak Rabin, who was the Israeli ambassador to the US at the time, was on board. Several individuals involved with the hijacking, including Leila Khaled deny this. The plane was diverted to Algiers, where 21 passengers and 11 crew members were held for 39 days, until 31 August.
- Gunmen opened fire on El Al Flight 253 in Athens about to take off for New York on 26 December 1968, killing one Israeli – this prompted a reprisal by Israel destroying airliners in Beirut.
- An attack on El Al Flight 432 passengers jet at Zürich airport on 18 February 1969, killing the co-pilot and wounding the pilot; an Israeli undercover agent thwarted the hijacking after killing the terrorist leader.
- Bombings by Rasmea Odeh and other PFLP members killed 21-year-old Leon Kanner of Netanya and 22-year-old Eddie Joffe on 21 February 1969. The two were killed by a bomb placed in a crowded Jerusalem SuperSol supermarket which the two students stopped in at to buy groceries for a field trip. The same bomb wounded 9 others. A second bomb was found at the supermarket, and defused. Odeh was also convicted of bombing and damaging the British Consulate four days later. In 1980, Odeh was among 78 prisoners released by Israel in an exchange with the PFLP for one Israeli soldier captured in Lebanon.
- The hijacking of TWA Flight 840 from Los Angeles to Damascus on 29 August 1969 by a PFLP cell led by Leila Khaled, who became the PFLP's most noted recruit. Two Israeli passengers were held for 44 days.
- On 6 September 1970, the PFLP, including Leila Khaled, hijacked four passenger aircraft from Pan Am, TWA and Swissair on flights to New York from Brussels, Frankfurt and Zürich, and failed in an attempt to hijack an El Al aircraft which landed safely in London after one hijacker was killed and the other overpowered; and on 9 September 1970, hijacked a BOAC flight from Bahrain to London via Beirut. The Pan Am flight was diverted to Cairo; the TWA, Swissair and BOAC flights were diverted to Dawson's Field in Zarqa, Jordan. The TWA, Swissair and BOAC aircraft were subsequently blown up by the PFLP on 12 September, in front of the world media, after all passengers had been taken off the planes. The event is significant, as it was cited as a reason for the Black September clashes between Palestinian and Jordanian forces.
- On 23-24 February 1972, Lufthansa Flight 649 was hijacked, allegedly by members of the PFLP. Eventually, all hostages onboard the seized Boeing 747-230B were released when the West German government paid a ransom of US$5 million.
- On 30 May 1972, 28 passengers were gunned down at Ben Gurion International Airport by members of the Japanese Red Army in collaboration with the PFLP's Waddie Haddad in what became known as the Lod Airport massacre. Haddad had been ordered to stop planning operations, and ordered the attack without the PFLP's knowledge.
- On 13 October 1977, the PFLP hijacked Lufthansa Flight 181, a Boeing 737 flying from Palma de Mallorca to Frankfurt. After various stopovers the pilot was killed. The remaining passengers and crew were eventually rescued by German counter-terrorism special forces.
- On 12 April 1984 a bus from Tel Aviv was hijacked. Bassam Abu Sharif in Damascus issued a statement in the name of the PFLP claiming responsibility.

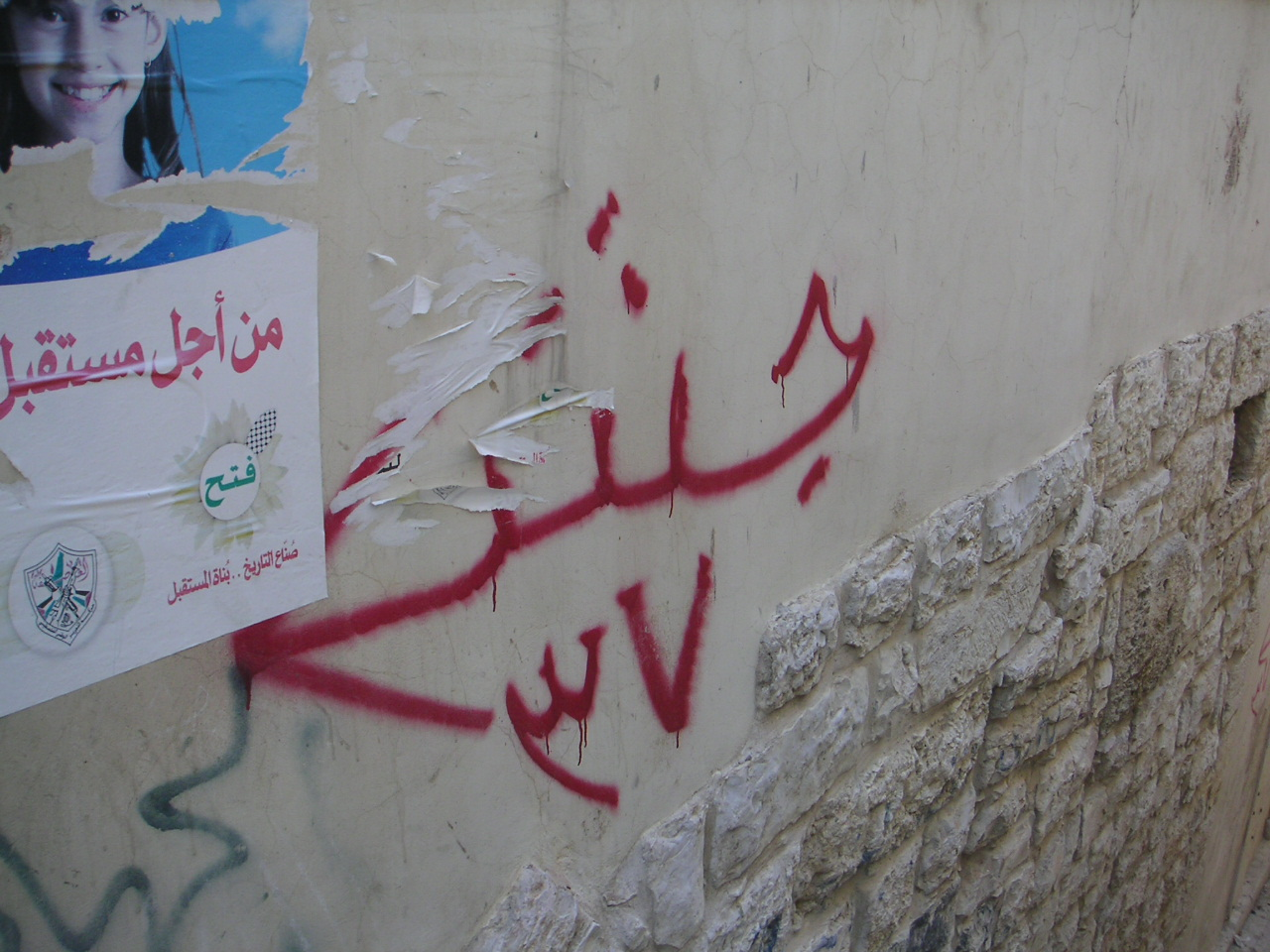
PFLP graffiti in Bethlehem

- On 8 June 1990 a clash occurred near Shuwayya in South Lebanon in which four members of the PFLP were killed by the South Lebanon Army (SLA).
- On 27 November 1990 five elite Israeli soldiers and two PFLP fighters were killed in the South Lebanon security zone.

=== Armed attacks after 2000 ===
The PFLP's Abu Ali Mustafa Brigades has carried out attacks on both civilians and military targets during the Al-Aqsa Intifada. Some of these attacks are:

- The killing of Meir Lixenberg, councillor and head of security in four settlements, who was shot while travelling in his car in the West Bank on 27 August 2001. PFLP claimed that this was a retaliation for the killing of Abu Ali Mustafa.
- The 21 October 2001 assassination of Israeli Minister for Tourism Rehavam Zeevi by Hamdi Quran.

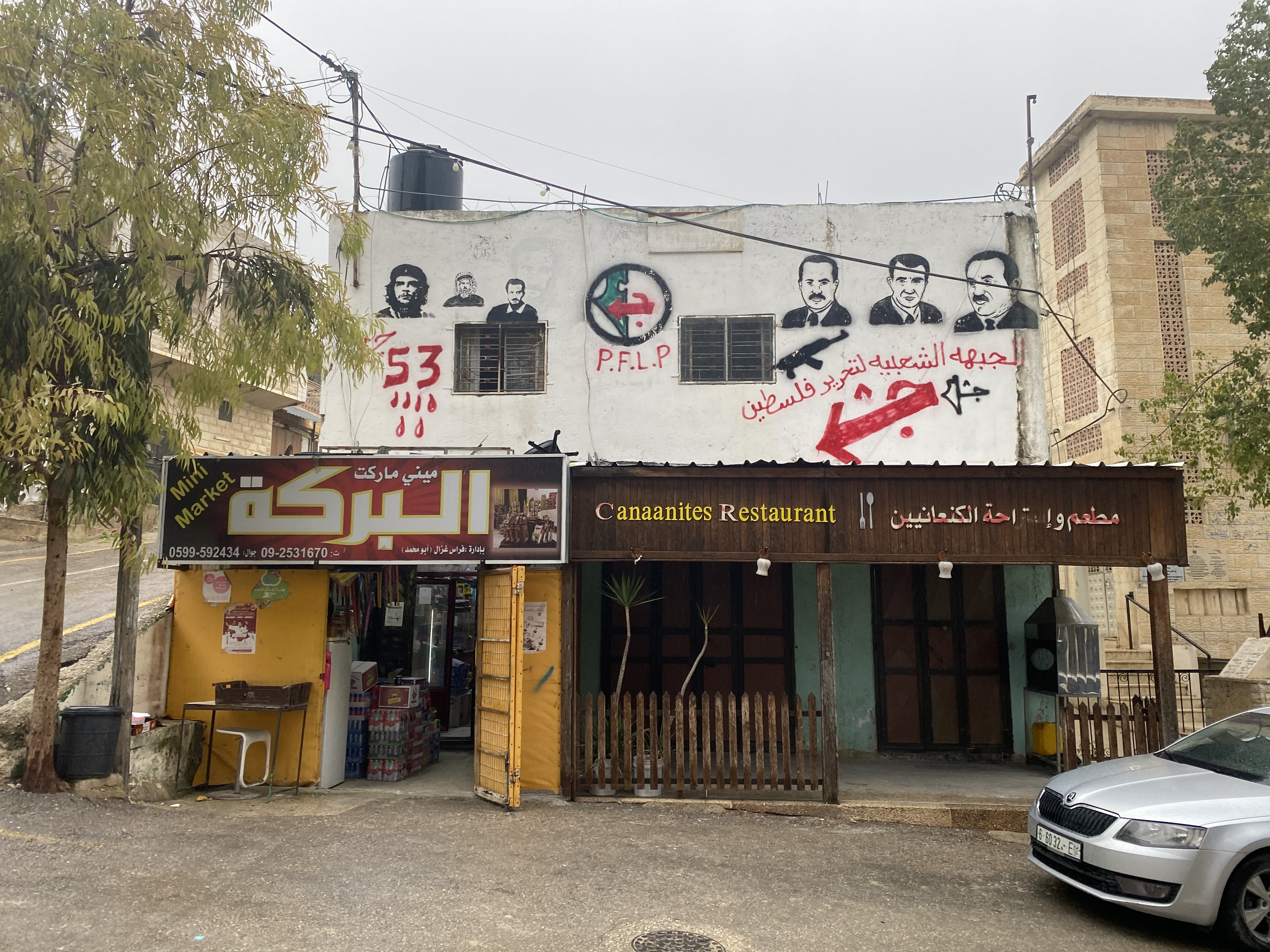
PFLP graffiti in Sebastia

- The PFLP claimed responsibility for the November 2014 Jerusalem synagogue massacre in which four Jewish worshippers and a policeman were killed with axes, knives, and a gun, while seven were injured. The Israeli authorities disputed this, stating that the attacker had acted alone.
- On 29 June 2015, the PFLP claimed responsibility for an attack in which Palestinians in a vehicle fired on a passing Israeli car. Four people were injured; one was severely injured and died the next day in hospital.
- Israeli police suspect the PFLP to be responsible for the roadside IED bomb explosion in 2019 which killed Israeli teenager Rina Shnerb during its detonation.
- Gaza war (2023–present): the Abu Ali Mustafa Brigades published videos of it storming Israeli watchtowers during the October 7 attacks, and has since fought alongside Hamas and other allied factions in multiple battles inside the Gaza Strip.

== Assassinations of leaders ==
=== 2024 Israeli invasion of Lebanon ===
Three PFLP leaders, Imad Audi, PFLP’s military leader in Lebanon; and Mohammad Abdel Aal and Abdel Rahman Abdel Aal, members of the group’s political bureau, were targeted and assassinated in the September 2024 Lebanon strikes by Israel.

== See also ==
- Arab Socialist Action Party
- List of political parties in the State of Palestine
- Palestinian domestic weapons production
- Mohamed Boudia
- Carlos the Jackal
- Revolutionäre Zellen
- Blekingegade Gang
- Islamic Jihad Movement in Palestine
- Popular Front for the Liberation of Palestine – General Command
- Popular Front for the Liberation of Palestine – External Operations
- Popular Front for the Liberation of Palestine – Special Command
- Democratic Front for the Liberation of Palestine
