= Mukataa =

Arabic term for an administrative center

Coordinates: 31°54′44.4″N 35°12′30.83″E

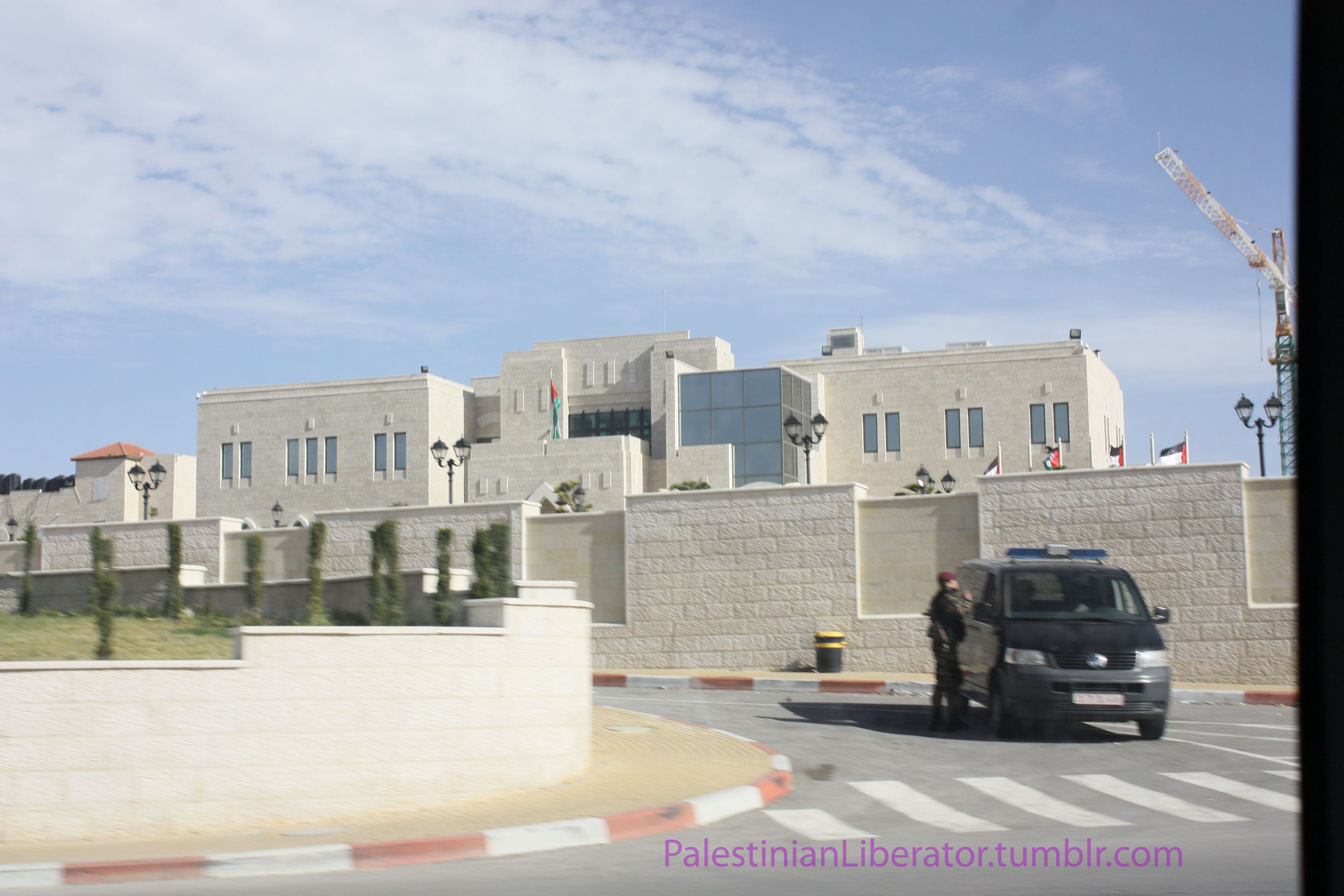
The Mukataa in Ramallah, 2013

Mukataa (Arabic: مقاطعة, romanized: muqāṭaʿah) is an Arabic word for headquarters or administrative center, particularly in Palestine. Mukataas were mostly built during the British Mandate as Tegart forts and were used both as British government centers and as dwellings for the British administrative staff. Some Mukataas also included police stations and prisons. After the British left, the buildings often functioned similarly under the Jordanians, and then the Israelis.

After the Oslo Accords, the Mukataas were used as governmental offices and headquarters for the Palestinian National Authority. The Mukaatas in Ramallah and Gaza, the two major Palestinian cities, were also used as headquarters to the high Palestinian Authority leadership, including as office for Yasser Arafat, long-time Palestinian Authority president.

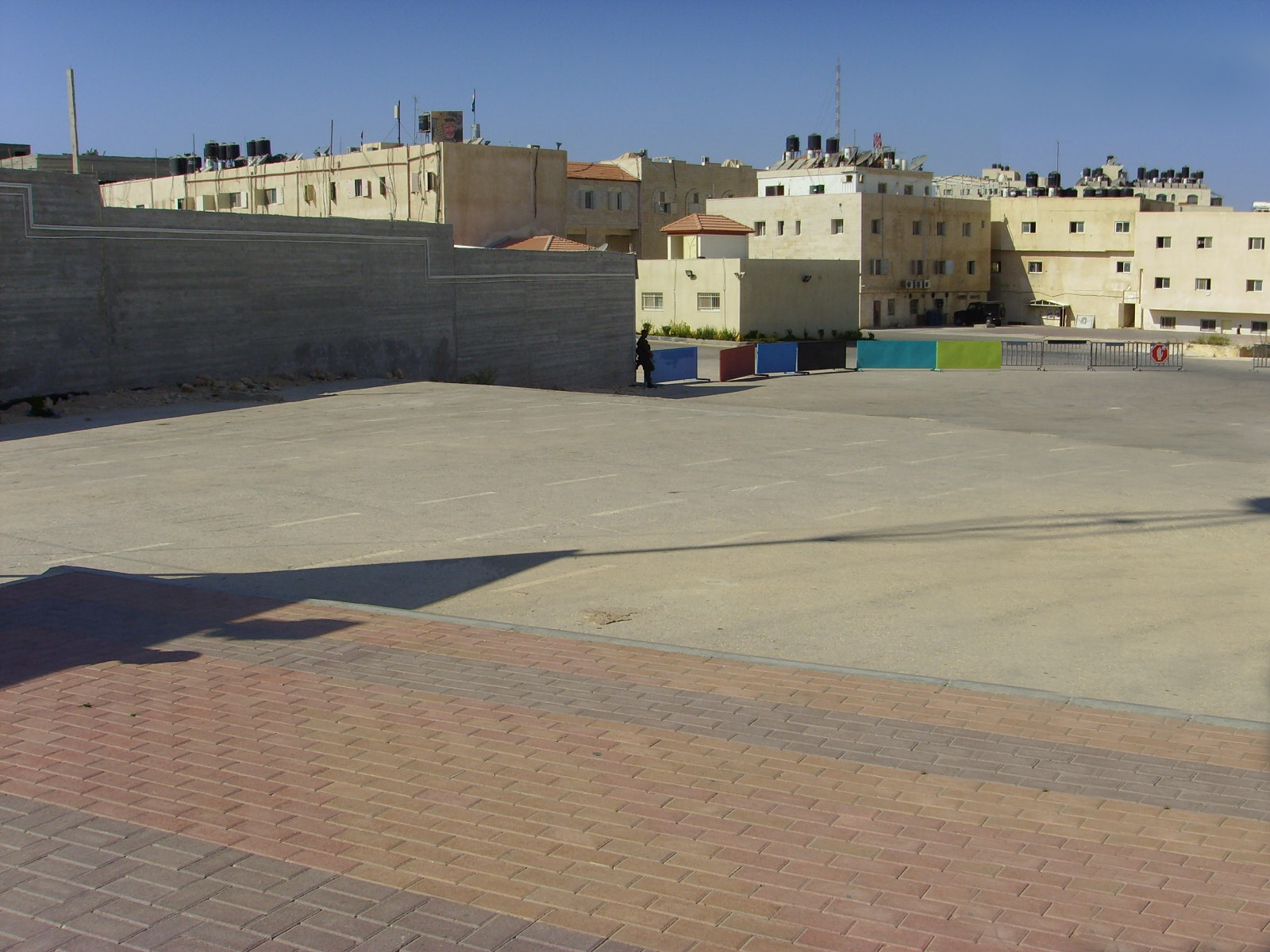
The Mukataa with the headquarters of the President of the PLO, 2007

During Operation Defensive Shield in April 2002, the Israeli Defence Forces raided the Mukataas in the West Bank. Some Mukataas, including the Mukataa in Hebron, were entirely demolished.

== Arafat's compound ==
The Mukataa in Ramallah, built in the 1930s during the British Mandate by the British engineer Sir Charles Tegart, was a military headquarters, a court of law and a prison. In May 1948, Jordan took over, and used the compound again as a prison and as a residence for Jordanian army officers and their families. From the occupation in 1967 it was the Israeli military headquarters, until the establishment of the Palestinian Authority in 1994. In 1996, Arafat moved in and the Mukataa became the official West Bank headquarters, known as Arafat's compound.

=== Israeli siege of March 2002 ===
On 29 March 2002, the Israel Defense Forces raided the compound and placed it under siege during Operation Defensive Shield. The Israeli army destroyed the offices of three security services, along with a VIP guesthouse, a prison, sleeping quarters for guards, a large kitchen, a car repair shop and a large meeting hall.

The siege was lifted on 2 May after six men wanted by Israel – four of them convicted of involvement in the October 2001 assassination of the Israeli tourism minister Rehavam Ze'evi – were moved to a prison in Jericho to be guarded by U.S. and British wardens. The US-brokered plan was to enable Israel to avoid angering the United States over the Israeli Cabinet decision to bar a UN fact-finding mission from investigating allegations surrounding Israeli army actions in Jenin refugee camp during Operation Rampart. Although the military had withdrawn from the compound, the cities and refugee camps in the West Bank remained surrounded by Israeli troops.

=== Siege of 6 June 2002 ===
On 6 June 2002, the IDF executed a new siege after having attacked the headquarters with tanks, bulldozers and armored vehicles. Arafat's office building was partly destroyed, besides other parts of the compound. The attack was a retaliation for a suicide bombing carried out by Islamic Jihad.

While Arafat was building a new Cabinet, the Israeli army five days later strengthened the siege on his headquarters with the support of US President George W. Bush. The White House rejected Egypt's call for a quick timetable for Palestinian statehood and Bush hinted that an international conference was a long way off, "because no one has confidence in the emerging Palestinian government."

=== Siege of September 2002 ===
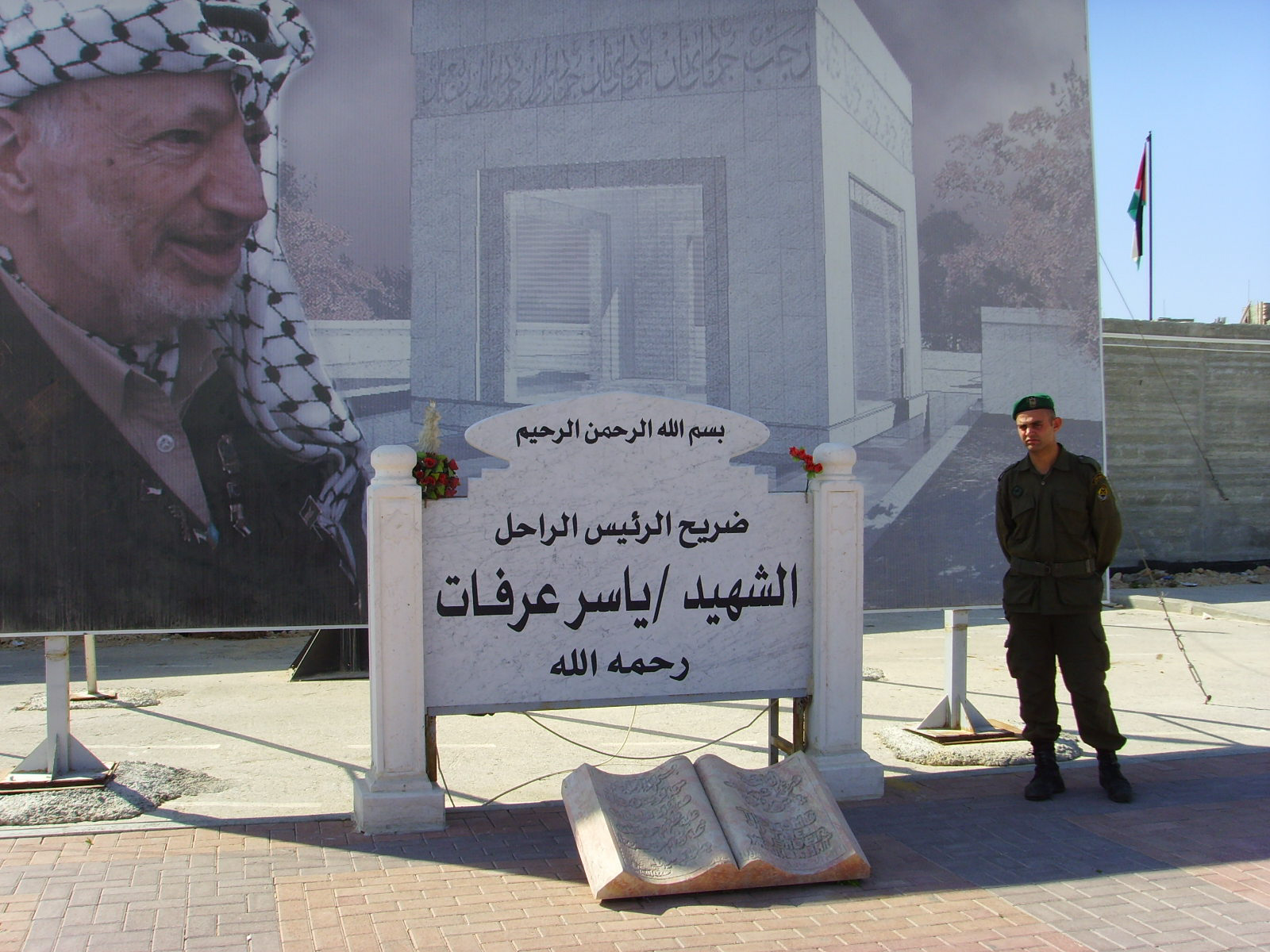
The tomb of Yasser Arafat, covered by a poster while the mausoleum for him was being built

After a suicide bombing struck Tel Aviv on 19 September 2002, the Mukataa was again placed under siege. During the next ten days, the IDF destroyed all of the buildings that had survived the former sieges with bulldozers and explosives, including the main interior ministry building. Only part of the building where Arafat and his people remained was left.

The siege re-ignited Palestinian support for Yasser Arafat. On 24 September 2002, the UN Security Council demanded an end of the siege, but Israel ignored the Resolution.

UN Under-Secretary-General Terje Rød-Larsen, one of the architects of the Oslo Accords, said on 27 September that "the Israeli army's siege of Yasser Arafat amid the ruins of his bulldozed presidential compound could mean 'the death' of hopes for a Palestinian state and a peace agreement." He alluded to the possible death of the two-state solution and said that "we're moving in the direction of state destruction and not state-building".

On 11 September 2003, the Israeli security Cabinet decided to "remove" Arafat, who still remained in the besieged compound. In a statement it said: "Recent days' events have proven again that Yasser Arafat is a complete obstacle to any process of reconciliation... Israel will act to remove this obstacle in the manner, at the time, and in the ways that will be decided on separately...." The compound remained under siege until Arafat's transfer in October 2004, for medical care in a French hospital.

=== Temporary burial-place of Arafat ===
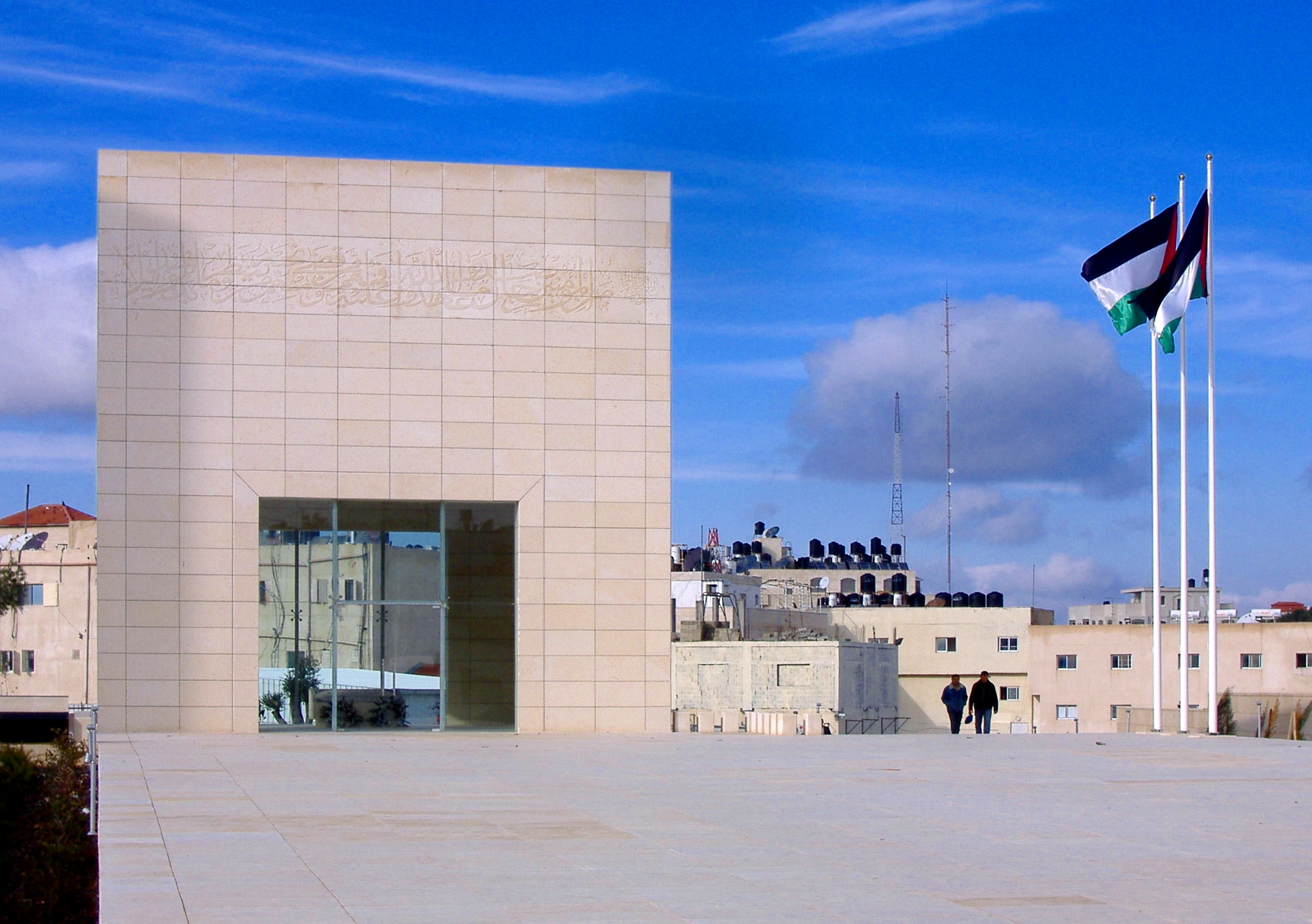
The Mausoleum of Arafat, today

In the early days of November, when it was clear his death was near, several locations were mentioned as possible burial sites. Jerusalem was the first choice, but Israeli Prime Minister Ariel Sharon said he would not allow this.

Following Arafat's death on 11 November 2004, the Palestinian leadership decided that he was to be "temporarily" interred in the Mukataa compound, pending the establishment of a Palestinian state and the transfer of his body to the Dome of the Rock compound on the Temple Mount in Jerusalem. Plans for Arafat to lie in state at the Mukataa prior to burial were canceled, because thousands of emotional mourners overwhelmed Palestinian security forces. Arafat was buried within the compound on 12 November, in a temporary manner. On 11 November 2007, a larger tomb clad in Jerusalem stone, and designed by Palestinian architects opened to the public. The message on the tomb indicated that the final resting place of Arafat shall be in Jerusalem, if it comes under Palestinian control.
