= 2017 Palestinian local elections =

Election in the Palestinian territories

The Palestinian cabinet, headed by Prime Minister Rami Hamdallah, announced on 23 June 2016 a decision to hold municipal elections on 8 October 2016. The elections were suspended by the Palestinian Court in early September and in January 2017 they were set to 13 May 2017. They were expected to be the first elections in all of the Palestinian territories since Hamas' takeover of the Gaza Strip in 2007, as Hamas agreed to participate in the local elections and allow them to be held in the Gaza Strip but disagreements between Hamas and Fatah led to Hamas boycotting stating it will participate only after "ending disagreements, achieving reconciliation, and uniting Palestinian institutions, including at the political, judicial, and security levels". The elections were later slated to be held in West Bank in May 2017 and were postponed in Gaza Strip.

According to a statement from the Palestinian Ministers Council, the reason behind the conduct of elections was to "attempt to end national conflict and unite Palestinians in accordance with the law and to pave the road towards holding presidential and legislative elections."

== Background ==
The last Palestinian local elections were held in 2012, excluding the Gaza Strip, where Hamas rules since 2007 and since has boycotted the local elections based in the Fatah controlled Palestinian authority. On 20 July 2016 Khalil al-Hayya, Hamas's political bureau member, said in a speech that Hamas is willing to participate in local elections in the Gaza Strip and the West Bank "no matter the circumstances". Hayya explained the reason behind Hamas’ approval to conduct and participate in the elections, saying, "These elections are local and aimed at serving a cause, so let us put all our efforts and dedication to serve our community and prioritize partnership." Analysts said Hamas decided to participate in the local elections, taking advantage of Fatah's internal crisis.

In a 28 July 2015 interview of Al-Monitor and Kayed al-Ghul, a PFLP's political bureau member, it was revealed that five Palestinian left-wing factions: PFLP, DFLP, FIDA, PPP and PNI have agreed to form a unified list for the first time in history, consisting of figures chosen by the parties. Ghul explained that one of the motives of the left-wing parties to create the list was the need to "break the acute polarization between Fatah and Hamas plaguing the Palestinian society" since 2007. Talal Abu Zarifa, a member of the DFLP's political bureau said the left-wing parties had contacts with other factions (such as Hamas and Fatah) but denied any alliance with them. In the 2006 Palestinian legislative elections, the left-wing parties which at the time ran in separated lists obtained 8% of the votes. Zarifa said the left-wing parties are not building on surpassing their previous goals in 2006, but he thinks there is a positive feeling now when the parties are unified. Talal Okal, a writer and political analyst said he believes the left-wing parties can rise in the elections. In contrast, Saleh Abdel Jawad, a professor of political science at Birzeit University and Hani Habib, a political writer for Al-Ayyam newspaper said they are not expecting a great success for the left-wing, as it constitutes a small portion of the Palestinian society.

The Islamic Jihad Movement in Palestine (PIJ) announced on 8 August 2016 that it will boycott the upcoming elections, claiming it is not an "appropriate way out of the Palestinian national impasse" and instead called for Hamas to reconcile with its rival faction Fatah and achieve national unity.

The local elections set for October were suspended on 8 September by the Palestinian High Court in Ramallah because of disputes between Hamas and Fatah, as well as a legal challenge on behalf of Palestinians living in East Jerusalem who were not allowed to vote. Fatah considered this decision as an attempt to politicise the judiciary and refused to recognise such courts. On 10 January 2017, a presidential decree amended the Local Elections Law of 2005, thus forming a local elections court which was authorized to look into electoral appeals instead of courts of first instance. The decree however was rejected by Palestinian factions.

The Palestinian Authority announced on 31 January 2017 that the elections will be held on 13 May 2017 in both West Bank and Gaza. However, Hamas rejected this decision. The Central Elections Commission announced a timeline for the elections on 6 February. The elections were later postponed in Gaza Strip.

After the declaration of the election results, the Palestinian Authority on 30 May decided to hold the local elections in Gaza Strip on 14 October and by-elections in local councils of West Bank where the elections were not held on 29 July. It however postponed the elections in Gaza Strip on 11 July following a recommendation by the Palestinian Central Elections Committee.

== Participants ==
The Central Election Commission began receiving applications for registrations of candidatures on August 16, 2016, with August 25, 2016 as the deadline for registrations. The Democratic Alliance List (consisting of Popular Front for the Liberation of Palestine (PFLP), Democratic Front for the Liberation of Palestine (DFLP), Palestinian Democratic Union (FIDA), Palestinian People's Party (PPP) and the Palestinian National Initiative (PNI)) filed its registration on August 16, 2016.

Fatah had announced that it would contest the elections under the name 'National Liberation and Construction Bloc'. In a statement on August 15, 2016 Fatah spokesman Dr. Fayez Abu Eita declared that municipal subcommittees were working across the country to finalize the lists of candidates before the Central Election Commission deadline.

Hamas had announced that it would field candidatures of non-partisan professionals. Hamas would retain the candidature name 'Change and Reform' from past elections.

Four smaller PLO factions; the Palestinian Liberation Front, the Arab Liberation Front, the Palestinian Popular Struggle Front and the Palestinian Arab Front, have announced that they would contest the elections together as the 'National Democratic Coalition'. When presenting the National Democratic Coalition on August 16, 2016, its leaders stressed that the Coalition was in alliance with Fatah.

On August 22, 2016 an independent list for the municipal council of Gaza City, 'Gaza Appeal', was registered with the Central Election Commission.

As of August 25, 2016 four lists for the Nablus municipal election were known: Democratic Alliance List headed by Majida Al-Masri, the Independent Youths' List headed by Mohammad Jihad Ad-Dawikat, Nablus for All headed by Adly Yaish (an alliance between Yaish and Fatah) and the Independent Professionals' List headed by Mohammad Ash-Shinar.

The Central Elections Commission published its lists of candidates on 30 August 2016. Out of 416 municipalities and villages councils, only 196 submitted multiple lists. In 38 cases no candidate lists were submitted. In 181 cases a consensus list was submitted, allowing the candidate to win by default while an incomplete list was submitted in one case. The Central Elections Commission received 163 objections to the initial listing of candidates. Seven candidates were disqualified after the commission acted on them.

PFLP suspended its participation in the elections on 13 March, stating it took the decision in response to the alleged suppression of a peaceful protest in front of the Courts Complex in Ramallah and al-Bireh Governorate by Palestinian Security Services on 12 March. On 28 March, Central Election Commission opened the registration for local elections in West Bank set for May 2017. Another electoral list was published on 9 April, with 179 locales submitting only one list, allowing for their automatic victory. No lists were submitted in 56 locales, with elections for them being postponed to a month later. 152 out of 391 locales of West Bank were slated to hold elections on 13 May.

CEC published the final register of electoral lists and candidates on 29 April. It stated that elections will be held in 145 councils, with 4411 candidates competing for 1561 council seats while 181 localities had submitted only one nominated electoral list containing a total of 1683 candidates, allowing for their win by acclamation on the election day. Decision on formation of councils in 65 localities which had submitted incomplete lists were scheduled to be done through the cabinet.

The CEC began the nomination process for the by-elections on 10 June. 51 lists nominated 411 candidates for elections from 142 seats in 14 local councils. Candidates in 18 local councils meanwhile won by acclamation and no candidate was nominated in 38 councils, allowing the Palestinian Authority to appoint members there on its own.

== Results ==
The first phase of elections were held in 326 local bodies with 3,253 seats. 420,682 of 787,386 eligible voters cast their ballots in the election, with voter turnout being recorded as 53.4%. Electoral lists in 181 municipalities won automatically as they were unopposed. Polls were held in 145 municipalities with 1,552 council seats. 1.3% of votes were cast as white ballots while 2.75% were declared as "null".

Tayseer Abu Sneineh, who had been convicted for the 1980 Hebron attack in which six Jews were killed, had been chosen to head Fatah's list in Hebron and obtained a mandate to lead the city's municipal council as mayor. Likud minister Ayoub Kara denounced his election, tweeting "[Sneineh's election as ] mayor of Hebron is a clear message from the Palestinians [in favor] of terrorist attacks against Israel." He also called upon Palestinian Authority's President Mahmoud Abbas to annul the elections.

In the by-elections, the turnout was 63.6%. Overall, the elections witnessed a decline in number of victorious women, youth and organisational candidates compared to previous local elections. 19.8% female candidates won in elections while 22.4% won by acclamation. Winning candidates in the age group of 25–35 years old were 19.5%, while those under the age of 45 were 37%. 65% of the overall winners were independent, while 35% belonged to a political party.

=== First phase ===
==== Won by elections ====
Party	No. of seats won	Percentage of seats won
Independent	1,009	65.01%
Fatah	429	27.64%
Democratic Front for the Liberation of Palestine	43	2.77%
Coalition lists	43	2.77%
Palestinian National Initiative	9	0.58%
Palestinian Democratic Union	7	0.45%
Democratic Alliance List	5	0.32%
Palestinian Popular Struggle Front	4	0.26%
Palestinian People's Party	3	0.19%

==== Won by acclamation ====
Party	No. of seats won	Percentage of seats won
Fatah	1,260	74.87%
Coalition lists	217	12.89%
Independent	195	11.59%
Democratic Front for the Liberation of Palestine	11	0.65%

=== Second phase ===
==== Won by elections ====
Party	No. of seats won	Percentage of seats won
Independent	105	73.94%
Fatah	25	17.61%
Democratic Alliance List	1	0.7%
Coalition lists	11	7.75%

==== Won by acclamation ====
Party	No. of seats won	Percentage of seats won
Fatah	101	60.84%
Coalition lists	18	10.84%
Independent	47	28.32%

== See also ==
- 2021–22 Palestinian local elections
- 2012 Palestinian local elections
- 2004–05 Palestinian local elections
- 1976 West Bank local elections
