= Yasser Abed Rabbo =

Palestinian politician (born 1944)

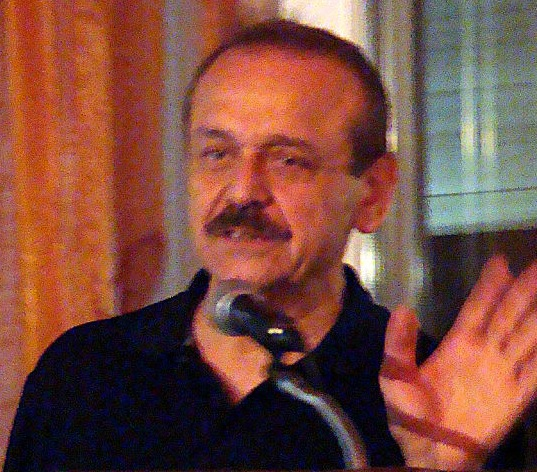
- Abed Rabbo in 2007

Culture and Arts Minister of the Palestinian National Authority
- In office 12 May 1994 – 29 October 2004
- Preceded by: Post created

Secretary-General of Palestinian Democratic Union
- In office 8 September 1993 – 23 November 2002
- Preceded by: Post created
- Succeeded by: Saleh Ra'fat

Personal details
- Born: 1944 (age 81–82) Jaffa, Mandatory Palestine
- Party: Palestine Democratic Union (1993–2004); Democratic Front for the Liberation of Palestine (1968–1993); Popular Front for the Liberation of Palestine (1967–1968)
- Education: American University in Cairo

Yasser Abed Rabbo (Arabic: ياسر عبد ربه) also known by his kunya, Abu Bashar (Arabic: ابو بشار) (born 1944) is a Palestinian politician and a member of the Palestine Liberation Organization's (PLO) Executive Committee.

== Biography ==
=== Early life and career ===
Born in Jaffa in 1944, Abed Rabbo became a Palestinian refugee as a result of the 1948 Arab–Israeli War. He later attended the American University in Cairo where he graduated with an MA in economics and political science.

=== Leftist activism and the PLO ===
Yasser Abed Rabbo started his political career in the Arab Nationalist Movement (ANM), a pan-Arabist organization. When the Palestinian branch of the ANM evolved in 1967 into the Popular Front for the Liberation of Palestine (PFLP), he became one of its leaders. In 1968, a leftist faction of the PFLP led by Nayef Hawatmeh split from the movement and formed the Democratic Front for the Liberation of Palestine (DFLP). Abed Rabbo became a member of the DFLP's politburo and was the organization's second most influential figure, after Hawatmeh. He became the most senior member of the DFLP to serve on the Palestine Liberation Organization's executive councils.

Between 1977 and 1994, Abed Rabbo served as the head of the PLO's Information Department. During the 1980s, Abed Rabbo became closely allied with PLO chairman Yasser Arafat and supported his attempts to negotiate a two-state solution. Arafat appointed him the PLO's representative in the 1988–1990 talks with the United States in Tunis. By then, relations between Abed Rabbo and Hawatmeh deteriorated. The two disagreed about Abed Rabbo's participation in Arafat's diplomacy regarding the Israeli–Palestinian conflict and the extent of the DFLP's political activities in Jordan, where Hawatmeh was based. Violent clashes between their supporters and Abed formed a separate faction of the DFLP in 1991, although he continued to use the DFLP's name. In 1991, he was a member of the Madrid Peace Delegation.

In 1993, Abed Rabbo renamed his faction the Palestinian Democratic Union (known by the acronym "FIDA"), leaving the Marxist–Leninist platform of the DFLP. Abed Rabbo became FIDA's representative on the PLO Executive Committee. Rabbo cautiously supported the 1993 Oslo Accords) between the PLO and Israel.

=== Post-Oslo career ===
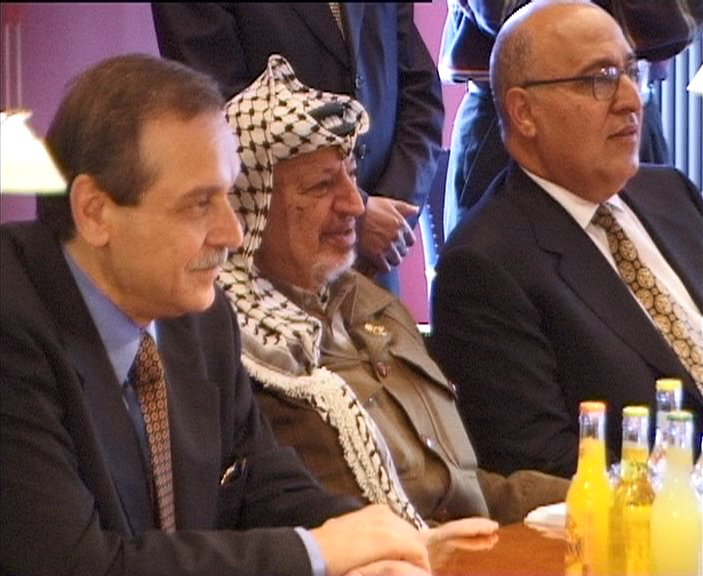
Abed Rabbo (left) with Prime Minister Yasser Arafat and cabinet minister Nabil Shaath in a meeting in Copenhagen, Denmark, 1999

In 1994, he entered the Israeli-occupied Palestinian territories to assume his position in the newly formed Palestinian National Authority. Representing FIDA, he served as the Culture and Arts Minister in Arafat's cabinet between 1994 and 2004. He headed the Palestinian negotiating team in final status peace talks with the Israelis between September 1999 and May 2000, and later took part in the Camp David II Summit in July 2000. Abed Rabbo participated in the 2001 Taba Summit.

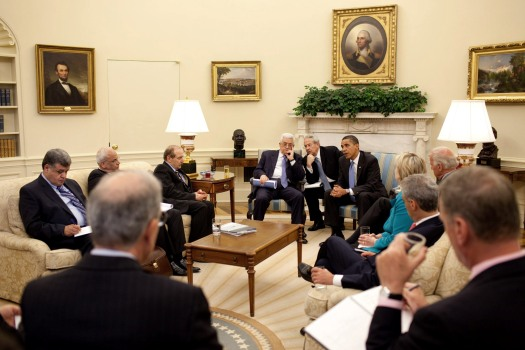
Yasser Abed Rabbo at the meeting between Barack Obama and Mahmoud Abbas in 2009

Abed Rabbo served as Minister in several Palestinian Authority cabinets from May 1994 until October 2004. In 2002, he resigned from FIDA after internal disputes. Women's rights activist Zahira Kamal had been chosen in an internal election to replace him as minister in the government of the Palestinian National Authority (PNA), but Abed Rabbo refused to step down, and instead left the party. He was able to remain in the cabinet as an independent, with Arafat's backing, but was replaced in FIDA by Saleh Ra'fat, its current Secretary-General.

He also presented several unofficial peace initiatives, widely believed to have had Arafat's blessing, such as the 2003 Geneva Accord. The latter, which he negotiated with Yossi Beilin, was condemned by both the Israelis and Palestinians, the latter of whom particularly condemned Abed Rabbo's alleged relinquishment of the Palestinian refugees' right of return. These initiatives, coupled with his public condemnations of suicide bombing attacks during the Second Intifada, strengthened Abed Rabbo's image as a pro-peace moderate, and he is often presented as a Palestinian "dove".

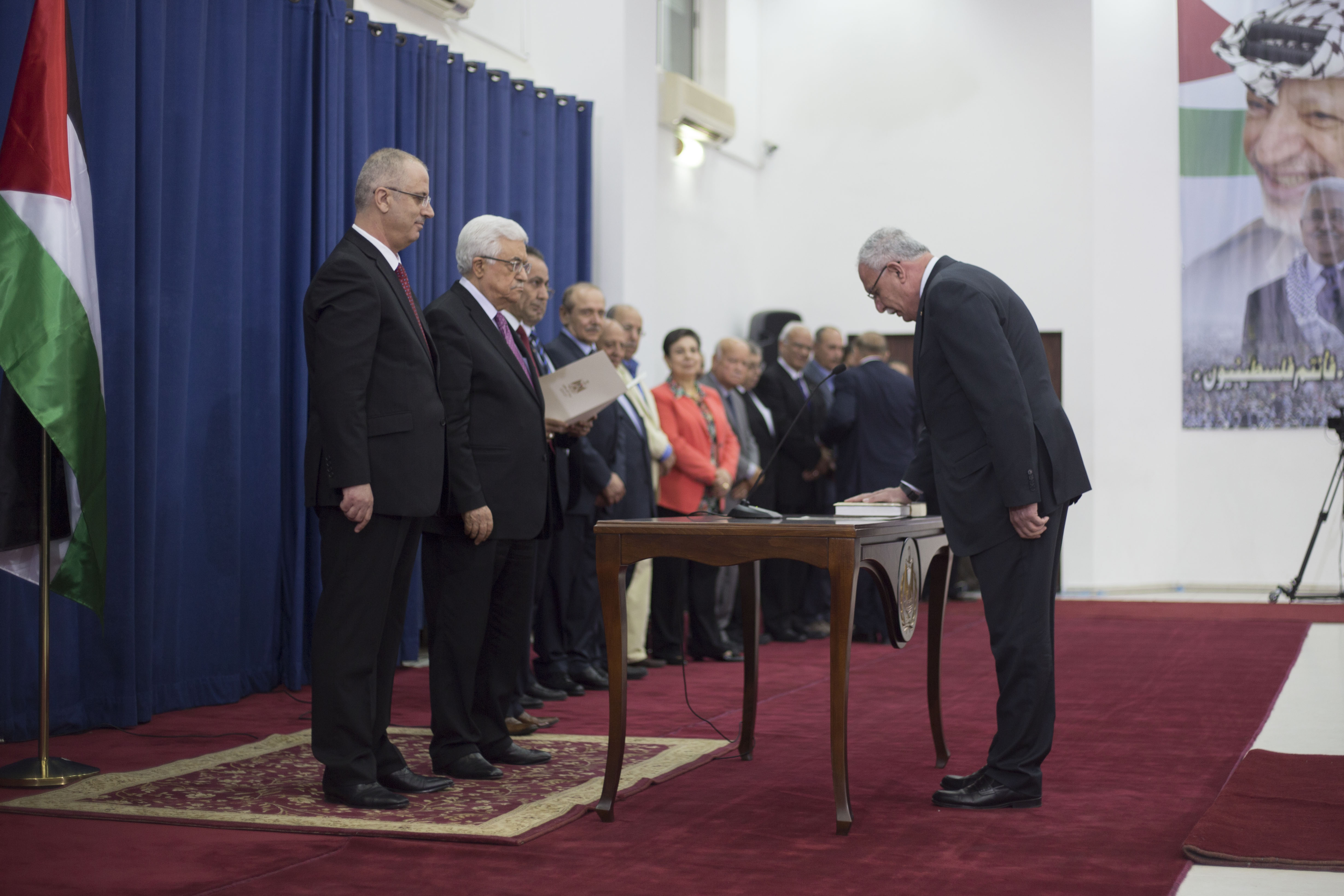
Abed Rabbo at the swearing in of the new unity government in Ramallah, 2014

After the death of Arafat in 2004, Abed Rabbo was removed from the post of minister in the PNA government by Arafat's successor, Mahmoud Abbas. Pending new elections, he remains on the PLO Executive Committee. As the second most senior member of PLO Executive Committee, Abed Rabbo has been critical of Abbas's governance.

On 30 June 2015, Abed Rabbo was dismissed as Secretary-General of the Executive Committee by Abbas. According to Arab sources, Abbas accused Abed Rabbo of conspiring with Mohammed Dahlan to oust Abbas in a coup. Anonymous Palestinian officials claimed the two had long been at odds over budget allocations and that Abbas viewed Abed Rabbo as a threat to his presidency with financial support from the United Arab Emirates (UAE). According to Nathan Thrall of the International Crisis Group, Abbas was less worried about a coup by Abed Rabbo, but was threatened by Abed Rabbo's perceived alliance with Abbas's rivals Dahlan and former prime minister Salam Fayyad. Abed Rabbo denied links with Dahlan, dismissing rumors of a conspiracy as "hallucinations". He also insists that he was not dismissed from the Executive Committee body. Abed Rabbo was replaced by senior Abbas aide Saeb Erakat.

== Bibliography ==
- Fischbach, Michael R. (2005). "Abd Rabbo, Yasir". In Phillip Mattar (ed.). Encyclopedia of the Palestinians. Infobase Publishing. ISBN 9780816069866.
