= Democratic Alliance List =

Democratic Alliance List قائمة التحالف الديمقراطي
- Coordinator: Mohammed Hamarsheh
- Founded: 2016
- Ideology: Palestinian nationalism Secularism; Socialism
- Political position: Left-wing
- National affiliation: PLO (majority)
- Factions: DFLP; FIDA; PNI; PPP; PFLP

The Democratic Alliance List (Arabic: قائمة التحالف الديمقراطي), also referred to as the Democratic Alliance Forces (قوى التحالف الديمقراطي) or just the Democratic Alliance (التحالف الديمقراطي), was a coalition launched before the Palestinian local government elections that were initially scheduled for October 2016, consisting of five left-wing Palestinian factions:

- Popular Front for the Liberation of Palestine (PFLP)
- Democratic Front for the Liberation of Palestine (DFLP)
- Palestinian People's Party (PPP)
- Palestinian Democratic Union (Fida), and
- Palestinian National Initiative (PNI)

along with several unaffiliated independent candidates. The Alliance was led by a Central Committee and an Advisory Board. Mohammed Hamarsheh was named coordinator of the Alliance.

== Launch ==
The Alliance was presented at a press conference in Ramallah on 10 August 2016, chaired by Mustafa Barghouti (General Secretary PNI), Qais Abd al-Karim (Deputy General Secretary DFLP), Bassam as-Salhi (General Secretary PPP), Khalida Jarrar (PFLP), and Zahira Kamal (Fida). Jarrar stressed that the alliance would act as a third force, seeking to overcome the Fatah-Hamas dichotomy.

Its candidature was officially registered with the Central Election Commission on 16 August 2016, the first day of registrations. The Alliance was assigned the letter Aleph (أ), the first letter of the Arabic alphabet, as its ballot symbol.

== Campaign and lists ==
On the night of 23 August 2016, unknown gunmen reportedly opened fire on the residence of Nureddin Khalaf, the top candidate of the Alliance in Burqin municipality, Jenin Governorate.

On 25 August 2016, the Alliance submitted to the Central Election Commission its candidate list for the Gaza Strip, and indicated that Majida Al-Masri would head its list in the Nablus municipality. In the Jenin municipality, the Alliance nominated PNI activist Mohammad Abu Al-Hija as its top candidate.

In the Al-Bireh municipality, the Alliance declared that they were continuing the work of the previous 'Al-Bireh for All' list from past elections. Jamal Al-Nasar was named number-one on the Alliance list in the municipality.

== Postponement of polls ==
On 8 September 2016, the Ramallah High Court of Justice postponed the local elections indefinitely. The Democratic Alliance List and its constituent parties criticized the court ruling.

== Election results ==
At the elections, which took place on 13 May 2017, the Alliance won 5 of the 3,253 contested seats, gaining 0.32% of the votes.

== Symbol ==
The symbol of the Democratic Alliance List resembles a dove in Palestinian national colours with the head shaped as the ballot symbol of the list, the letter Aleph. The text reads "Palestine deserves the Democratic Alliance".
