= Abu Khaled (DFLP) =

Palestinian militant and commander

- أبو خالد
- Organization: National Resistance Brigades
- Known for: Being the spokesperson for DFLP's military wing

Abu Khaled (Arabic: أبو خالد, romanized: Abū Khāled) is the nom de guerre of a Palestinian military commander who is the spokesperson for the National Resistance Brigades, which participated in the attack on October 7. Also the military wing of the Democratic Front for the Liberation of Palestine, a leftist political and military organization. Nothing is known of his identity or personal life. He was active on Twitter before his account was removed. He has been the spokesperson for the organization for more than a decade. In 2022, he resigned from his position over controversy surrounding the DFLP's participation in the Palestinian Central Council, but has since rejoined the organization. On 8 October 2023, he announced the DFLP's involvement in October 7 attacks.
