= 1979 Ma'alot attack =

1979 terrorist attack

- Part of Palestinian insurgency in South Lebanon
- Location: Ma'alot, Israel
- Date: 13 January 1979
- Attack type: Shootout
- Deaths: 1 (+3 attackers)
- Injuries: 3
- Perpetrator: DFLP

On 13 January 1979 three terrorists from the Democratic Front for the Liberation of Palestine (DFLP) stormed a hotel in Ma'alot, Israel in an attempt to take the guests there as hostages before being killed by Israeli soldiers.

== Attack ==
The three terrorists, armed with Kalashnikov rifles and grenades, had sought to take the 230 guests at the hotel in the town near the Lebanese border as hostages, before being killed by Israeli troops in a shootout. One woman died after jumping from a window trying to escape from the terrorists. Two other guests were injured in falls, and an Israeli soldier was wounded by gunfire.

Israelis were embittered after the attack by the apparent failure of UNIFIL to prevent terrorist incursion into Israel from South Lebanon. The United States condemned the attack, stating that "There can be no justification of such acts which result in the death and injury of innocent persons. We extend our sympathy to the victims and their families."

The attack was the subject of a letter by Yehuda Zvi Blum, the Permanent Representative of Israel to the United Nations, to the President of the United Nations Security Council, criticising the support of the attack by Yasser Arafat and the Palestine Liberation Organization (PLO).

The attack echoed a previous attack by the DFLP in Ma'alot in 1974, in which 31 people were killed in a mass-hostage situation.
