= Palestinian National Initiative =

Political party in Palestine

Palestinian National Initiative المبادرة الوطنية الفلسطينية
- Leader: Mustafa Barghouti
- Founded: 17 June 2002
- Headquarters: Ramallah, Palestine
- Ideology: Palestinian nationalism Social democracy Democratic socialism Secularism; Anti-corruption
- Political position: Left-wing
- National affiliation: DAL
- International affiliation: Progressive Alliance; Socialist International (Consultative)
- Legislative Council: 2 / 132

Palestinian National Initiative (PNI; Arabic: المبادرة الوطنية الفلسطينية al-Mubādara al-Waṭaniyya al-Filasṭīniyya) is a Palestinian political party led by Mustafa Barghouti.

Its formation was formally announced on 17 June 2002 in Ramallah on the West Bank, part of the Palestinian territories, by Haidar Abdel-Shafi, Mustafa Barghouthi and Ibrahim Dakkak. The PNI views itself as a "democratic third force" in Palestinian politics and opposes the dichotomy between Fatah (which it views as corrupt and undemocratic) and Hamas (which it views as extremist and fundamentalist).

== Principles ==
The platform of the PNI states:

"Only through the establishment of a sovereign, independent, viable and democratic Palestinian state on all of the territories occupied by Israel in 1967, with East Jerusalem as its capital, can a just peace be achieved.

The Initiative calls for the implementation of relevant United Nations resolutions requiring the withdrawal of the Israeli army from the West Bank and Gaza and safeguarding the internationally recognized right of Palestinian refugees to return to their homeland."

The PNI defines this as collective Palestinian goals but sees as its own role to democratize and unite the Palestinian movement, with the focus on the Palestinian National Authority (PNA). It has campaigned extensively for democratic reform within the PNA and advocates a national emergency government encompassing all factions (including the islamist Hamas) as a means of stopping autocracy and lawlessness in Palestinian politics. This is in part motivated by the desire for democracy and in part by the inefficiency and self-destructive tendencies of the Palestinian factional system.

The PNI demands the proclamation of a single political direction, to be determined democratically, and a single policy for achieving these goals. The PNI itself believes that the methods used should be based on a reversion of what it refers to as the "militarization" of the intifada and a continued struggle by peaceful means. It has no armed wing and does not use nor advocate violence, although it states that it supports in principle a right of resistance to occupation.

== Supporter base and leaders ==
The PNI is dominated by secular intellectuals, some of them former members of the far-left Palestinian People's Party. It is strongly based in civil society organizations and NGOs operating in the Palestinian territories and has extensive connections with foreign aid and support groups. Its lack of a role within the PLO and in the PNA has greatly reduced its visibility to ordinary Palestinians.

The PNI has gained some support among Palestinian exiles, most notably the late Edward Said, but is extremely weak or non-existent in the main refugee communities in Jordan, Lebanon and Syria.

The Initiative is led by a General Secretary, with Mustafa Barghouti occupying that post since its founding.

== Election results ==
=== 2005 presidential election ===
At the 2005 Palestinian presidential election held on 9 January 2005, Mustafa Barghouti campaigned on a platform of democratization as the PNI's candidate, and in the absence of a Hamas candidate (due to the Hamas' policy of boycotting all PNA institutions) quickly became the leading opponent to PLO chairman Mahmoud Abbas. Barghouti was also endorsed by the Popular Front for the Liberation of Palestine, after that group failed in its attempts to organize a single candidacy for all secular Palestinian factions outside Fatah.

During the campaign, Barghouti's fame snowballed after the international press picked up his name as the main opposition candidate. He was twice arrested by the Israel Defense Forces, suffering a broken knee in custody, and complained of discrimination by both the Abbas-run PNA and Israel, which he accused of covertly backing Abbas's candidacy. In the final results, he polled 19.48%, with Abbas gaining 62.52% and the remaining five candidates all coming in below 3.5%.

=== 2006 legislative election ===
At the 2006 Palestinian legislative election for the Palestinian Legislative Council, the PNI ran as part of the Independent Palestine list. The list netted about 2.7% of the votes, winning two seats on the PLC, filled by Mustafa Barghouti and Rawya Rashad Sa-eed al-Shawa.

=== 2005 local elections ===
The PNI made minor gains in the first round of the 2005 Palestinian local elections, held in January 2005, after the presidential elections.

In the second round, conducted in May 2005, the PNI by itself or in coalitions won a majority in at least six localities, with a total 10% of the vote for candidates outside Fatah and Hamas.

In the third round, held on the West Bank on 29 September, the PNI ran by itself or in coalitions in 18 out of 104 municipalities and won control of 16 councils.

The fourth and last round was postponed until December.

=== 2016 local elections ===
For the 2016 Palestinian local government elections that were initially scheduled for October 2016, the PNI was one of the five left-wing Palestinian factions that formed a joint list called the Democratic Alliance List. At the elections, which took place on 13 May 2017, the Alliance won 5 of the 3,253 contested seats, gaining 0.32% of the votes.

=== 2021 legislative election ===
In the abortive 2021 Palestinian legislative election, the PNI submitted a list under the name "List of the National Initiative for Change and to End the Division". The elections were ultimately postponed indefinitely and did not take place.

Initially, the PNI was in talks with other leftist parties, including the PFLP, the DFLP, the PPP and FIDA, to run on a united left list. However, talks broke down and the proposed list failed to materialize.

== See also ==
- List of political parties in the Palestinian National Authority
