= Tayseer Abu Sneineh =

Palestinian Arab politician

Mayor of Hebron
- Incumbent
- Assumed office 14 May 2017

Member of the waqf that administers the Ibrahimi Mosque in Cave of the Patriarchs
- Incumbent
- Assumed office 1993

Personal details
- Born: 25 October 1954 (age 71) Hebron, Jordanian-occupied West Bank
- Party: Independent (since 2022)
- Other political affiliations: Fatah
- Children: 8
- Education: University of Jordan
- Occupation: Politician, former math teacher
- Known for: Former member of Fatah party, mayor of Hebron, convicted for taking part in the 1980 Hebron terrorist attack

Tayseer Abu Sneineh (Arabic: تيسير أبو سنينة; born 25 October 1954), also spelled Tisir Abu Sneina, is a Palestinian politician, a former member of the Fatah party, and mayor of Hebron, in the West Bank. He was convicted by Israel for taking part in the 1980 Hebron attack, which killed six civilians. He served as Minister for Prisoner Affairs for the Palestinian Authority from March to June 2007. He was elected mayor of Hebron on 14 May 2017. Abu Sneineh has been lecturing voluntarily to Palestinian youth on the 1980 attack.

== Early life and education ==
Abu Sneineh was born on 25 October 1954 in Hebron, in the Jordanian-occupied West Bank. He graduated from Al Hussein Bin Ali Secondary School in 1973. In 1977, he earned a bachelor's degree in Mathematics from the University of Jordan in Amman.

== Militant activity ==
Along with other Fatah militants, Abu Sneineh carried out the 1980 Hebron attack on 2 May 1980, in which six Israeli civilians were killed and 16 wounded. He was sentenced to life imprisonment and released in a prisoner exchange.

== Political career ==
Abu Sneineh was appointed in 1993 to the waqf that administers the Ibrahimi Mosque in Cave of the Patriarchs. Jewish groups protested his appointment. He subsequently served as the Palestinian Authority's Minister for Prisoner Affairs in the Second Haniyeh Government, from March 2007 to June 2007.

Abu Sneineh was elected as the mayor of Hebron after heading the victorious Fatah party's electoral list during the 2017 Palestinian local elections.

In May 2022, Mahmud Abbas expelled Abu Sneineh, his wife, and more than 40 other Fatah members for participating in the 2021–22 Palestinian local elections. Abu Sneineh headed the "Loyalty" list, an alliance between Fatah, Hamas, and the Popular Front for the Liberation of Palestine, which won a landslide victory in the elections in Hebron on March 26. Abu Sneineh did not hold any formal position in Fatah. According to Abu Sneineh, Abbas, through his advisor Mahmoud Al-Habbash, offered him a ministerial position or governor of Hebron in exchange from withdrawing or dissolving the Loyalty list.

Abu Sneineh caused controversy by making comments about offering cash to anyone who killed stray dogs in November 2022, before taking back his comments and claiming that he was not being serious but only making suggestion.
