= Bashir Barghouti =

Palestinian journalist

Bashir Barghuthi

Minister of Industry of the Palestinian National Authority
- In office June 1996 – 1997

General Secretary of the Palestinian Communist Party
- Incumbent
- Assumed office 1982

Personal details
- Born: 1931 Dayr Ghassana, Mandatory Palestine
- Died: September 9, 2000 (aged 68–69)
- Party: Palestinian Communist Party
- Other political affiliations: Palestinian People's Party; Jordanian Communist Party; National Liberation League in Palestine
- Education: American University in Cairo
- Profession: Journalist and Communist Leader

Bashir Barghuthi (Arabic: بشير البرغوثي, 1931–2000) was a Palestinian communist and journalist.

== Early life ==
Barghouti was born in the village of Dayr Ghassana in the Ramallah Subdistrict.

== Career ==
=== Journalism and activism in Jordan ===
Living in Jordan, he founded the central organ of the Jordanian Communist Party al-Jamahir (The Masses) and joined the General Union of Palestinian Students (GUPS). In 1957 the paper was closed by Jordanian authorities, and Barghouti was incarcerated the Al-Jaffar prison. When freed in 1965, he was refused a journalist license by the Jordanian government, but continued to write under an assumed name. After 1967 he opposed the right of king Hussein of Jordan to speak on behalf of Palestinians.

=== Return to the West Bank ===
In 1974 he returned to the West Bank via family reunification, and became a figure of the Jordanian Communist Party there. He founded the newspaper al-Fajr (Dawn), which he edited from 1975 to 1977. In February 1977 there was a political rift between him and Fatah, and Barghouti left his editorship of al-Fajr. In February 1978 he founded the newspaper al-Tali'a (The Vanguard) in Jerusalem.

On 2 August 1980, Barghouti was arrested by the Israeli authorities along with two other prominent Palestinian newspaper editors, Mamoun Alsayed, his replacement as editor of al-Fajr, and Akram Haniyah, editor of al-Sha'b, on the justification that the arrests were necessary for "the maintenance of security, public order, and safety in the area." The three would be kept under house arrest for the next two years, until late December 1982.

In August 1981, Israeli intelligence prevented a plot by a Muslim Brotherhood cell to assassinate Barghouti.

=== Palestinian Communist Party ===
In 1982 the JCP branches in the West Bank were converted into the Palestinian Communist Party. Barghouti became the General Secretary of PCP.

In 1987, after the PCP having joined the Palestine Liberation Organization, Barghouti was inducted into the PLO Executive Committee. Barghouti was then an influential figure during the First Palestinian Intifada. According to Michael Bröning of the Friedrich Ebert Foundation, "during the First Intifada, the PCP played an influential role in organising popular protests against the Israeli occupation of the West Bank and Gaza. The PCP's secretary general Bashir Barghouti is credited with creating one of the first 'popular committees' that steered the uprising's course."

=== Oslo process and Palestinian Authority ===
He was a figure during the Oslo peace process. In June 1996 he was appointed Minister of Industry in the first Palestinian National Authority government. In 1997 he suffered a severe stroke. He was then appointed Minister of State (a largely symbolic position).

== Death ==
Barghouti died on September 9, 2000.

== See also ==
- Atef Adwan
