= Palestinian People's Party =

Communist party in Palestine

Palestinian People's Party حزب الشعب الفلسطيني
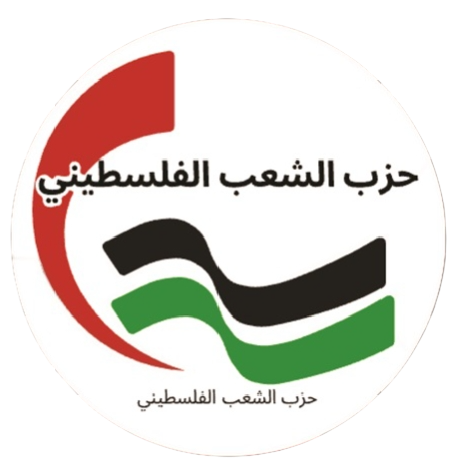
- Abbreviation: PPP
- Leader: Bassam Al-Salhi
- Founder: Bashir Barghouti
- Founded: February 1982
- Split from: Jordanian Communist Party
- Ideology: Communism; Marxism; Palestinian nationalism Left-wing nationalism Two-state solution
- Political position: Far-left
- National affiliation: Palestine Liberation Organization; Democratic Alliance List
- International affiliation: IMCWP; IPA
- Legislative Council: 1 / 132

Website
- www.ppp.ps (defunct)

The Palestinian People's Party (PPP; Arabic: حزب الشعب الفلسطيني, romanized: Hizb ash-Sha'b al-Filastini), founded in 1982 as the Palestinian Communist Party, is a Marxist–Leninist political party in Palestine and among the Palestinian diaspora.

== History ==
The original Palestine Communist Party was founded in 1919. After the foundation of the state of Israel and the Jordanian annexation of the West Bank, the West Bank communists joined as the Jordanian Communist Party, which gained considerable support among Palestinian Arabs. It established a strong position in the Palestinian trade union movement and retained considerable popularity in the West Bank during the 1970s, but its support subsequently declined. In the Egyptian-occupied Gaza Strip a separate Palestinian communist organization was established.

In February 1982, prominent Palestinian communists held a conference and re-established a Palestinian Communist Party. The new party established relations with the Palestine Liberation Organization, and joined the PLO in 1987. A PCP member was included in the Executive Committee of the PLO in April that year. PCP was the sole PLO member not based amongst the fedayeen organizations.

The PCP was one of the four components of the Unified National Leadership of the First Palestinian Intifada, and played an important role in mobilizing grassroots support for the uprising.

The party, under the leadership of Bashir Barghouti, played an important role in reevaluating Marxism-Leninism as a political philosophy earlier than many other communist organisations in the region. It was renamed in 1991, after the collapse of the Soviet Union, to the Palestinian People's Party, arguing that the class struggle in Palestine should be postponed as the Palestinian people are still waging a struggle of national liberation in which elements of all classes should unite. The renaming also reflected a move by the party to distance itself from the image of communism, an ideology perceived as antagonistic to religion in the Muslim world; however, party members still identify with Marxism.

The party was an enthusiastic advocate of the Oslo Accords; however, it now criticizes the "failure" of the peace process, while still defending the goal of an independent Palestinian state in the West Bank and Gaza Strip.

In 2002, the party's then general secretary, Mustafa Barghouti left it with some supporters to found the Palestinian National Initiative.

In the January 2005 presidential election, the party's candidate Bassam as-Salhi received 2.67% of the vote.

At the 2006 Palestinian legislative election PPP formed a joint list called Al-badeel for the left wing parties with Democratic Front for the Liberation of Palestine, Palestine Democratic Union and independents. It received 2.8% of the popular vote and won two of the Council's 132 seats.

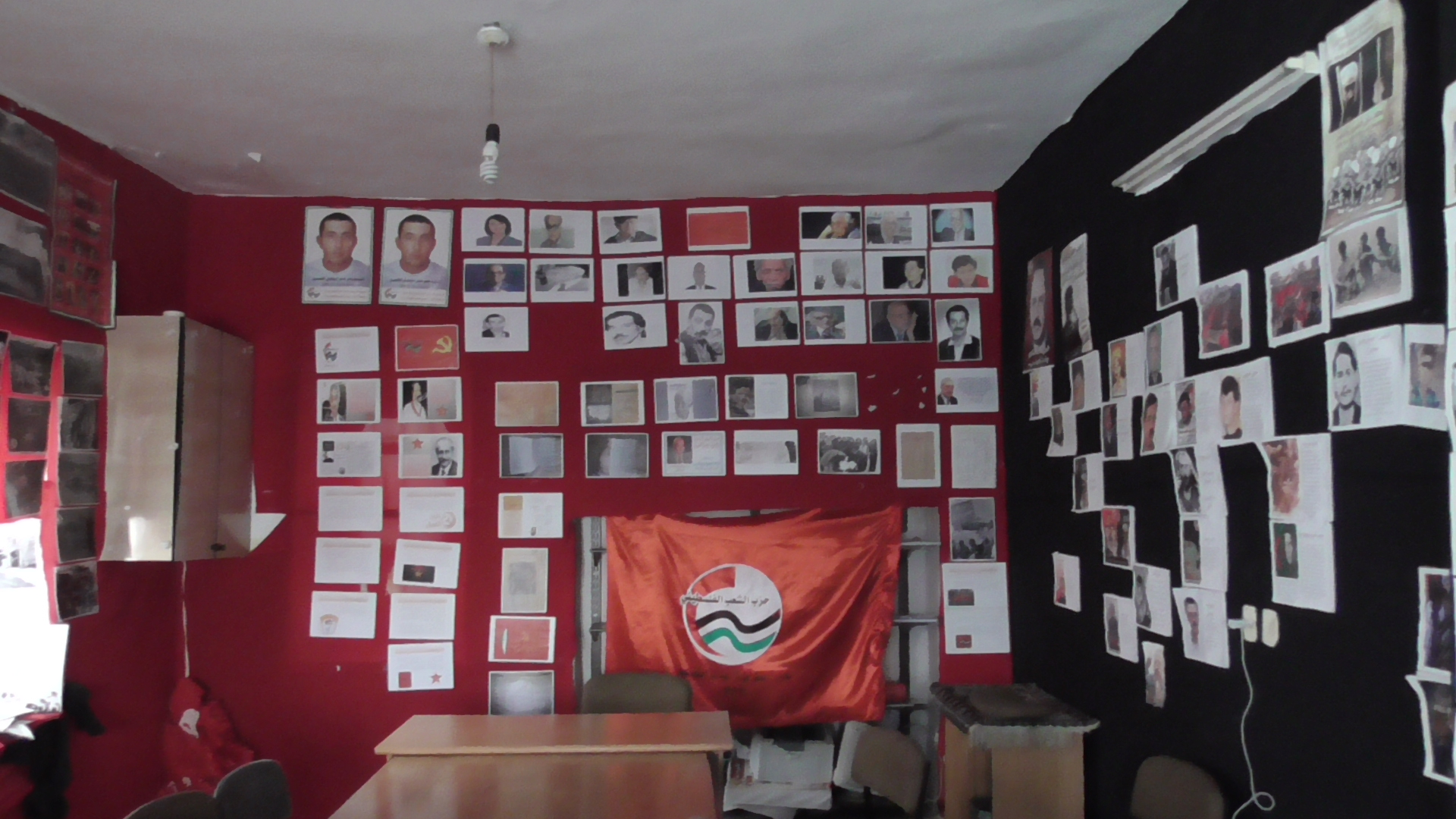
Interior of the PPP office in Hebron, February 2018

For the 2016 Palestinian local government elections that were initially scheduled for October 2016, the PPP was one of the five left-wing Palestinian factions that formed a joint list called the Democratic Alliance List. At the elections, which took place on 13 May 2017, the Alliance won 5 of the 3,253 contested seats, gaining 0.32% of the votes.

In the lead up to the 2021 Palestinian legislative election, the PPP took part in negotiations with the Popular Front for the Liberation of Palestine, Palestinian National Initiative, Democratic Front for the Liberation of Palestine, and the Palestinian Democratic Union, to form a joint leftist list for the elections, however differences between the PPP and the PFLP caused the negotiations to break down. The PPP ultimately formed a joint list with the Palestinian Democratic Union called "United Left", led by Fadwa Khoder, a member of the PPP's Politburo.

== Party leaders ==
- Bashir Barghouti (1982–1998)
- Hannah Amireh, Abdel Majid Hamadan, Mustafa Barghouti (1998–2002)
- Bassam Al-Salhi (since 2003)

=== Other notable members ===
- Suleiman Al Najjab, member of the PLO Executive Committee.

== See also ==
- Palestine Communist Party (1923–1943)
- League of Palestinian Communists
