= Ma'alot massacre =

1974 Palestinian terrorist attack in Israel

- Part of the Palestinian insurgency in South Lebanon
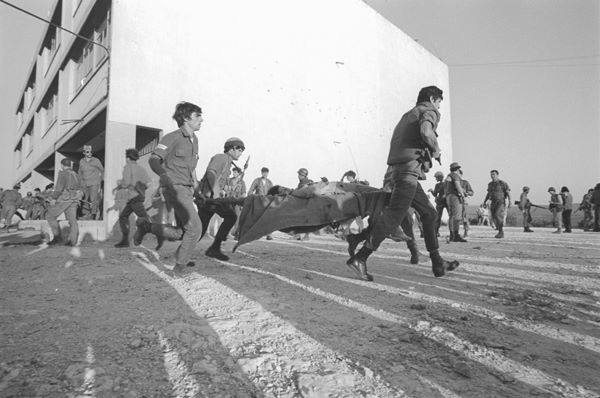

- The attack site
- Location: 33°01′00″N 35°17′09″E; Ma'alot, Israel
- Date: 15 May 1974; 52 years ago
- Target: Netiv Meir elementary school
- Attack type: Spree killing, hostage taking, school shooting
- Deaths: 31 Israelis
- Injuries: 70 Israelis
- Perpetrators: 3 DFLP gunmen

The Ma'alot massacre was a Palestinian terrorist attack that occurred on 14–15 May 1974 and involved the hostage-taking of 115 Israelis, chiefly school children, which ended in the murder of 25 hostages and six other civilians. It began when three armed members of the Democratic Front for the Liberation of Palestine (DFLP) infiltrated Israel from Lebanon. Soon afterwards they attacked a van, killing two Israeli Arab women while injuring a third, and entered an apartment building in the town of Ma'alot, where they killed a couple and their four-year-old son. From there, they headed for the Netiv Meir Elementary School in Ma'alot, where in the early hours of 15 May 1974 they took hostage more than 115 people including 105 children. Most of the hostages were 14- to 16-years-old students from a high school in Safad on a pre-military Gadna field trip spending the night in Ma'alot.

The hostage-takers soon issued demands for the release of 23 Palestinian militants and 3 others from Israeli prisons, or else they would kill the students. The Israeli side agreed, but the hostage-takers failed to get an expected coded message from Damascus. On 15 May, minutes before the 18:00 deadline set by the DFLP, the Sayeret Matkal commandoes stormed the building, upon which the DFLP militants killed 25 of the hostages (22 of them students), and wounded another 68.

== Attack ==
Ma'alot, located on a plateau in the hills of the Galilee region of Israel, 6 miles (9.7 km) south of the Lebanese border, is a development town founded in 1957 by Jewish immigrants, mainly from Morocco and Tunisia. The attack was carried out by three members of the Democratic Front for the Liberation of Palestine (DFLP) dressed in Israel Defense Forces uniforms.

The DFLP terrorists infiltrated through the Nahal Mattat Nature Reserve from south of the Lebanese village of Rumaysh. The group entered Israel near Moshav Zar'it on Sunday night, 13 May. They were armed with AK-47 assault rifles, grenades, and plastic explosives of Czechoslovak manufacture. They hid until the next night in the orchards near the Druze village of Hurfeish. A border patrol unit discovered their footprints but were unable to track them down.

Proceeding to Ma'alot up the winding road, the militants encountered a van driven by a Druze resident of Hurfeish bringing Arab Christian women from the village of Fassuta home from work at the ATA Textile Works in the Haifa Bay area. The leader of the militants, Linou, stood on the roadway and opened fire on the vehicle, instantly killing one woman, and wounding both the driver and other workers, one of whom later died of her wounds. The driver turned off the headlights and drove backward up the hill towards Moshav Tzuriel. Israeli soldiers were called to the scene but failed to catch them.

Reaching Ma'alot, the militants knocked on the doors of several homes. When they came to the home of Fortuna and Yosef Cohen, two of them who were Israeli-Arabs said in Hebrew that they were police searching for terrorists. When the door opened the militants burst in and killed the couple, their 4-year-old son Eliahu and wounded their 5-year-old daughter Miriam. Fortuna, seven months pregnant, tried to flee the intruders, but she was also shot. The only one in the family who survived unhurt was 16-month-old Yitzhak, a deaf-mute. From there, the militants headed for the Netiv Meir Elementary School where students on a school trip were lodged. On the way, they met Yaakov Kadosh, a sanitation worker, and asked for directions to the school. They then shot and injured him.

Netiv Meir Elementary School was a three-story concrete building with apartment buildings under construction nearby. The militants entered the building at 4 am, and took the 102 visiting teenage students hostage. The teenagers were spending the night in the school building as part of a three-day trip. They were students from a high school in Safad. Allegedly one of the parents of the slain teenagers had begged the headmaster to cancel the trip after learning that militants had entered the area. By then it was considered too late to cancel the trip because all the arrangements had been made. The militants had intended to lie in wait for children arriving the next day and had not expected to find so many students lodging there. Three of four teachers escaped by jumping through the window, and abandoned their 90 pupils, which created a great deal of bitterness among the parents. The teachers were immediately suspended from their posts by local authorities. 85 students and several teachers were held hostage. The students were forced to sit on the floor at gunpoint, with explosive charges between them.

In the morning the militants demanded the release from Israeli prisons of 23 Arab and three other prisoners, including Kozo Okamoto – a Japanese national involved in the 1972 Lod Airport massacre. Unless these conditions were met, they declared that they would kill the students. The deadline was set for 6:00 pm the same day.

At 10am 27-year-old Sylvan Zerach, at home on leave from the army, stood near the base of the tall concrete water tower not far from the school building to get a closer view of what was going on. One of the militants opened fire on him, hitting Zerach in the neck. Zerach later died in the hospital.

At an emergency session of the Knesset, a decision was reached to negotiate, but the hostage-takers turned down a request for more time.

=== Takeover operation ===
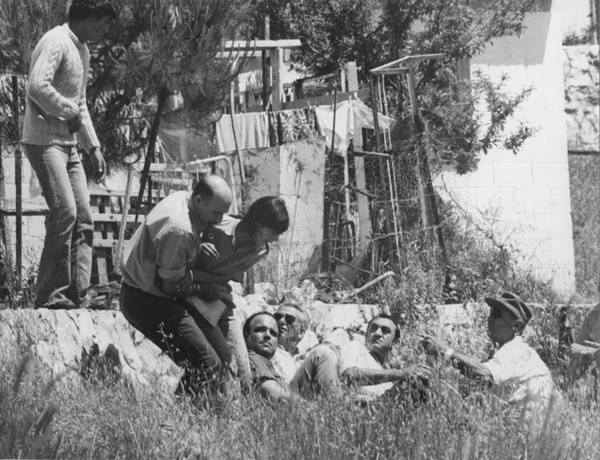
Mordechai Hod and Moshe Dayan helping to rescue a girl that was held hostage

At 17:25 the commander of the elite Sayeret Matkal special forces group was given the 'green light' to storm the building. The assault force was divided into three units; two to break in from the entrance while a third was to climb a ladder and enter from a window facing north. The squads moved into position from the blind side to the east, from the frames of some apartment buildings under construction. The operation was to have been coordinated with simultaneous sniper fire on the three hostage-takers. At 17:32 the first squad entered the building through the main entrance on the first floor, which was blocked with tables and chairs. The first three-man team, led by Yuval Galili of Kibbutz Geva, was hit by gunfire on the stairs leading to the second floor. Galili threw a phosphorus grenade into the second floor hallway to create a smokescreen. The smoke from the explosion blinded the second team led by Amiran Levine, which had been ordered to take out Linou, at that time posted at the third floor window where he had shot Zerach.

When they broke into the classroom where the students were being held, Harbi grabbed a student, Gabi Amsalem, and held him at gunpoint on the floor. Rahim was shot dead but Linou managed to reach the classroom, grab several magazines from the teacher's desk and reload his weapon. He then sprayed the students with machinegun fire and tossed grenades out the window. When a burst of fire broke his left wrist, he threw two grenades at a group of girls huddled on the floor. Several students leaped from the windows to the ground, some 10 feet (3.0 m) below.

Beside the three DFLP militants, twenty-two high school students were killed in the attack and over fifty were wounded. The student victims were buried in their hometown, Safed. Some of the 10,000 mourners who attended the funerals chanted "Death to the terrorists".

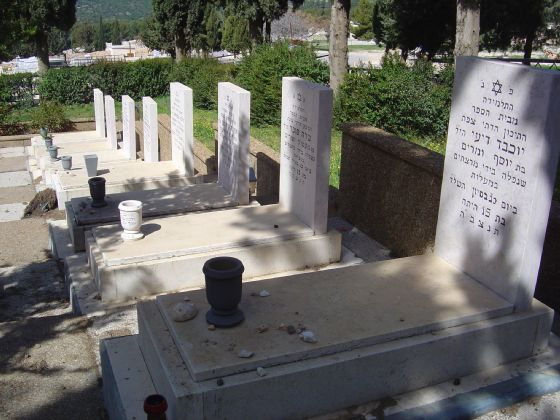
Ma'alot massacre victims in the Safed cemetery

== Israeli response ==
The next day Israel Defense Forces planes bombed offices and training bases of the DFLP and PFLP. According to a BBC report, the bombing inflicted damage in seven Palestinian refugee camps and villages in southern Lebanon killing at least 27 people and leaving 138 injured.

After an investigation Attorney General Meir Shamgar decided that the three teachers who escaped and abandoned their students had done no wrong. Parents of the victims angrily rejected the report.

The massacre led to the creation of the Yamam special police unit.

Amos Horev, President of Haifa's Technion – Israel Institute of Technology, headed a Commission of Inquiry in May 1975 that investigated the massacre. The subsequent Commission Report listed a number of mistakes made by the government and security forces, and made several recommendations.

The DFLP tried a second time to take hostages at a hotel in Ma'alot in 1979, but were killed by Israeli soldiers.

== Commemoration ==
In 2007, American filmmakers visited Ma'alot to film a documentary on the massacre. A memorial corner in the library of the Netiv Meir school displays photographs of the victims and archival footage on the massacre. A feature movie, Their Eyes Were Dry, retells the story of the massacre.

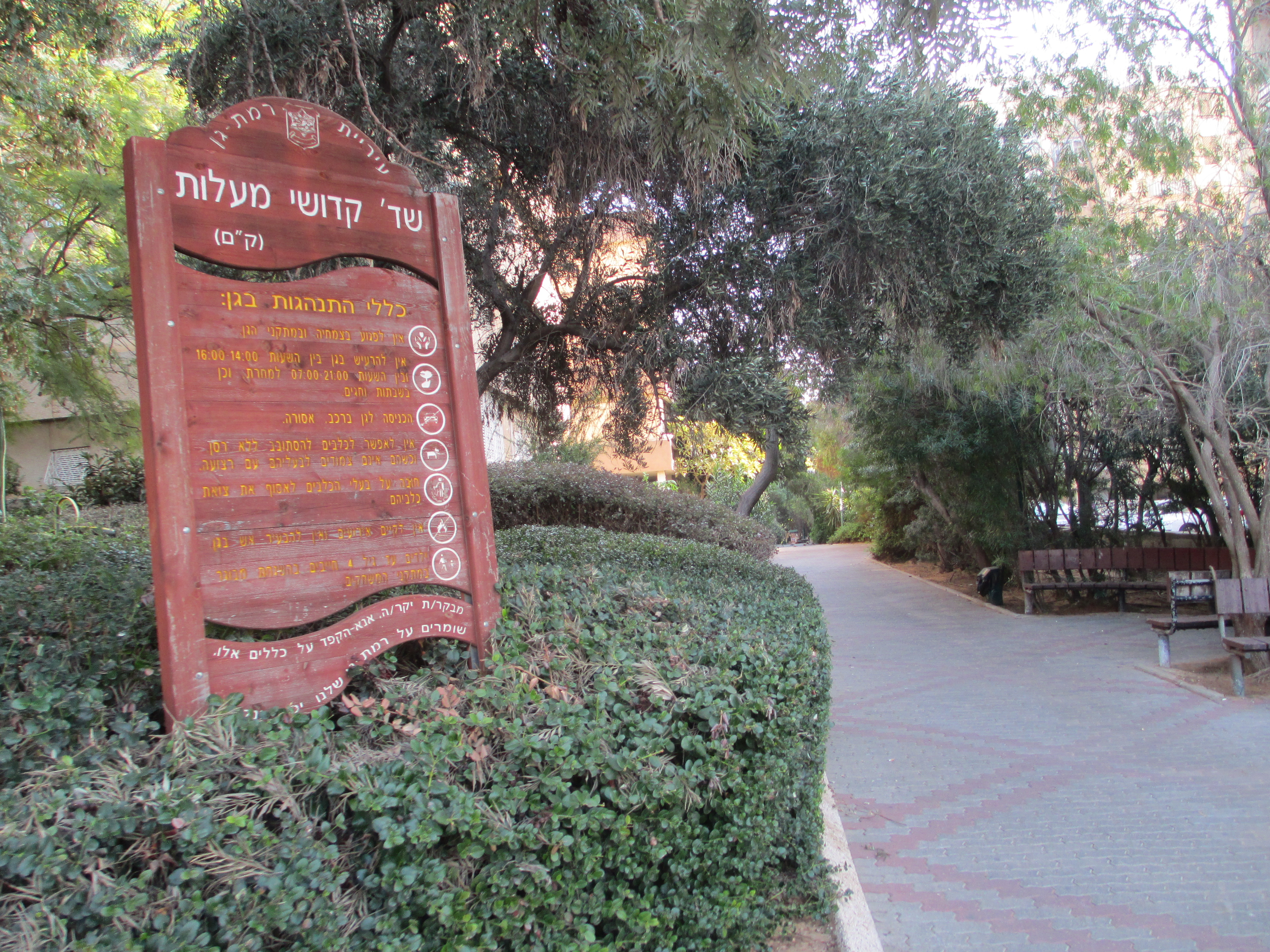
Ma'alot massacre victim avenue (Sderot Kam) in Ramat Gan.

A Reform synagogue in southern California is named Shir Ha-Ma'alot ("Song of Ascent") in memory of the victims.

== See also ==
- Avivim school bus attacks
- Beslan school hostage crisis 2004 hostage crisis in Russia by Islamic militants
- Israeli casualties of war
- List of massacres in Israel
