= Eli HaZe'ev =

American-born Israeli convert to Judaism and victim of terrorist attack

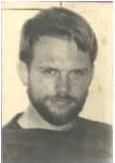
Eli HaZe'ev

Eli HaZe'ev was an American-born Israeli ultranationalist settler, who was a victim of the 1980 Hebron attack. A convert to Judaism and Vietnam War veteran, he was a member Meir Kahane's Kach Movement and of the Jewish Defense League.

== Biography ==
Born James Eli Mahon Jr., HaZe'ev was born to US Air Force Colonel James E. Mahon in Alexandria, Virginia. He served as a sniper in the 101st Airborne Division during the Vietnam War where he was badly wounded. During the war he lost his thumb, his teeth were shattered by a grenade, he received napalm burns, and an enemy bullet had punctured his lung.

After the war, Eli joined up with a motorcycle gang in Washington state and was arrested for allegedly killing another member with a shotgun, though the charges were later dropped.

Eli immigrated to Israel in 1974 where he converted to Judaism and settled in the Kiryat Arba settlement of Hebron in the West Bank. He joined the Israel Defense Forces, despite initially being rejected due to his injuries from Vietnam, and served in the 1978 Israel invasion of Lebanon as a sniper.

After the war, Eli became involved in several Religious Zionist settler organizations, such as Gush Emunim and the Jewish Defense League, though he believed them to not be extreme enough. In 1979, a group of Jewish vigilantes, including HaZe'ev, raided several Arab homes in Hebron, ending in their arrest by Israeli authorities. Haze'ev was jailed for eight months.

In 1980, HaZe'ev was one of the victims of the 1980 Hebron attack, who murdered several Jews leaving the Tomb of the Patriarchs and heading to the Hadassah clinic. During the attack, he attempted to unsling his M16 and attacked one of the gunmen, but died from his injuries.
