= Suleiman Al Najjab =

Palestinian activist and politician (1934–2001)

- Born: Suleiman Rashid Al Najjab; 1934; Jibya, Mandatory Palestine
- Died: 12 August 2001 (aged 66–67); USA
- Burial place: Ramallah, State of Palestine
- Years active: 1950s–2001
- Political party: Palestinian People's Party
- Other political affiliations: Jordanian Communist Party; Palestine Communist Party

Suleiman Al Najjab, also known as Abu Firas, (1934–2001) was a Palestinian activist and communist politician. He was the secretary general of the Palestine Communist Party and a member of the Palestine Liberation Organization's executive committee and Palestinian National Council.

== Early life ==
Al Najjab was born in a village, Jibya, Mandatory Palestine, in 1934.

== Career and activities ==
Al Najjab was a member of the Jordanian Communist Party and was elected as its deputy secretary general. The party was banned in 1957, and he was arrested by the Jordanian authorities in April 1957. He was imprisoned for eight years. He joined the Palestinian resistance movement in 1967 forming armed forces in the West Bank. He was active in the establishment of the Palestine National Front (PNF) in 1973. Next year he was arrested by the Israelis and was expelled to Jordan in February 1975 after being detained for nine months without any charge or trial. The Israelis accused him of being the leader of the Palestinian Communist Organization and also, of the PNF. Al Najjab's deportation to Jordan led to the decrease in militant activities of the PNF in the West Bank.

Al Najjab restarted the activities of the PCP in Jordan and was elected as its secretary general. The PCP became part of the PLO, and Al Najjab began to serve as a member of the PLO executive committee in April 1987. Al Najjab was one of the leaders who were supported by the Palestinians in the US according to a survey in 1988. The PCP was renamed as the Palestinian People's Party in 1991, and he was elected a member of its central committee and politburo. The same year he was re-elected to the PLO executive committee in the meeting held in Algiers, Algeria, on 23–28 September 1991. Al Najjab also served at the Palestinian National Council.

Following the Oslo agreement and the establishment of the Palestinian Authority (PA) Al Najjab settled in the West Bank. He and other nine PLO executive committee members rejected the second Oslo accord on 4 October 1995. He was among the PLO delegates in Geneva diplomatic initiative which started the US-PLO dialogue.

Al Najjab was also elected as a member of the PLO executive member in the meeting held in Gaza, State of Palestine, on 25 April 1996. He acted as one of the advisers to Yasser Arafat, leader of the PA, during the Camp David Summit held in July 2000.

== Death ==
Al Najjab died of cancer in the US on 12 August 2001. He was buried in Ramallah on 18 August.
