= Akram Haniyah =

Palestinian journalist

Advisor to Yasir Arafat
- In office ?–?

Member of the Palestinian delegation to the 2000 Camp David Summit
- In office ?–?

Editor-in-chief of al-Ayyam
- In office January 1995 – ?

Personal details
- Born: 1953 (age 72–73) Ramallah, Palestine

Akram Haniyah (Born in Ramallah 1953) was a Palestinian journalist, writer, and Fatah advisor. He served as editor-in-chief of the Palestinian newspapers al-Sha'b between 1979 and 1986 and later of al-Ayyam. He also wrote several pieces of short fiction, served as an advisor to Yasser Arafat, and served as a member of the Palestinian Authority delegation to the 2000 Camp David Summit.

== Biography ==
=== Early life and education ===
Haniyah was born in Ramallah, Palestine, in 1953. He earned a bachelor's degree in English literature at Cairo University in 1975.

=== Editor-in-chief of Al-Sha'b (1979-1986) ===
In 1976, Haniyah joined the staff of Jordanian newspaper Al-Sha'ab in Amman. He would remain at the newspaper for one year, before returning to Palestine in 1978 to take a position as a public relations officer for Birzeit University near Ramallah and to join the staff of Palestinian newspaper al-Sha'b. In 1979, he became editor-in-chief of al-Sha'b.

On 2 August 1980, Haniyah was arrested by the Israeli authorities along with two other prominent Palestinian newspaper editors, Mamoun Alsayed, editor of al-Fajr, and Bashir Barghouti, editor of al-Tali'a, on the justification that the arrests were necessary for "the maintenance of security, public order, and safety in the area." The three would be kept under house arrest for the next two years, until late December 1982.

In May 1985, the Israeli Military Censor threatened him with police investigation after he approved the publication in al-Sha'b a statement by President of Sudan Abdel Rahman Swar al-Dahab in support of the Aliyah from Ethiopia.

=== 1986 deportation ===
In November 1986, Haniyah was arrested by Israeli forces with the goal of deporting him to Jordan under Israel Defense Forces Central Command orders. An IDF spokesperson described him as an extremist who agitated for "hostile activity in Judaea, Samaria and elsewhere" and was a key Fatah activist. Haniyah was not formally charged with any crime.

The deportation order provoked widespread discontent among Palestinian journalists and academics. On 28 December, two Palestinians were injured after being shot in a demonstration in Ramallah against the deportation that clashed with the Israeli military. The move to deport him to Jordan in particular raised fears that he could be endangered due to his opposition to King Hussein of Jordan.

The order also provoked international controversy. The foreign ministers of the European Economic Community released a joint statement condemning the deporation. The International Federation of Journalists petitioned Prime Minister of Israel Yitzhak Shamir to cancel the deportation. The Jerusalem Post published an editorial claiming that the deportation would please "those who believe in an ‘iron fist’ policy, who believe that putting fear in the hearts of discontented Palestinians in the territories will lead them to eschew all resistance to the occupation; perhaps even to leave en masse for a future under some Arab sovereignty."

Following criticism of the arrest, the Israeli military stated that there was "a turning point in his activity" in 1986 and that he "started to plan and implement the building up of an overall leadership of Fatah in the territories," adding that they couldn't risk a formal trial because "even from inside prison he’ll be able to continue to operate and maintain contacts with his colleagues." Haniyah argued that he was a "victim of political revenge for my struggle as a political person, as a journalist and as a writer to achieve the legitimate rights of my people" and that his deportation "as the deportation of others before me, will not change our just and legitimate demands for basic human rights." In an article, Haniyah compared the process to Franz Kafka's The Trial, claiming that the Israeli authorities had refused to show him their file on him justifying the deportation.

He appealed the deportation order to the Israeli military tribunals and then to the Supreme Court of Israel, represented by lawyers Avigdor Feldman and Felicia Langer. In late December 1986, the Supreme Court ruled that the Israeli authorities' evidence against him was classified on national security grounds and that his lawyers would not be allowed to examine it. Following the ruling, he announced that he would drop his appeal and comply with the deportation order. Before the end of the month, he was deported to Algeria via a Swissair flight.

=== Participation in peace negotiations (1991-2001) ===
In 1991, Haniyah visited the United States as part of a Palestine Liberation Organization delegation for peace negotiations.

In 1993, as part of the Oslo Accords, the PLO named Haniyah among a list of Palestinian political exiles who they demanded be allowed to return to the Occupied Palestinian territories.

He would later serve as a member of the PLO delegation to the 2000 Camp David Summit. In response to the failure of the Summit to produce an agreement, Haniyah claimed that the American and Israeli governments demonstrated "a lack of rational ability to understand the Palestinian reality" and that the United failed to listen to Palestinian warnings that they would not sign an agreement that "does not answer to their minimum national rights." American journalist Jeffrey Goldberg wrote in The Atlantic in 2009 that "I remember Akram Haniyeh, then one of Arafat's top aides, telling me in 2001 or so that Israel should make the best deal it could with Fatah, because with Hamas there could be no compromise, and Hamas is most certainly coming."

=== Editor-in-chief of Al-Ayyam (1995-onwards) ===
After being allowed to return to Palestine following the Oslo Accords, Haniyah founded the Ramallah-based newspaper al-Ayyam in January 1995, serving as its first editor-in-chief.

In 2001, academic Orayb Aref Najjar noted that Haniyah's "position as an unofficial advisor to Yasser Arafat has enabled him to protect his journalists from the censorship and intimidation of Palestinian secret services intent on stifling free debate in Palestinian society. When Palestinian security personnel summon Al-Ayyam reporters over stories that they do not like, they have to answer to Haniyah, who points out to the security chiefs that what they are doing is illegal under the 1995 Press and Publication Law... And while Al-Ayyam, like all Palestinian papers, refrains from directly criticising Arafat, its reporters and columnists have criticised mismanaged institutions and the civil servants who run them. Haniyya's political columns are closely read by Palestinians as well as by Israelis and other foreigners."
