= League of Palestinian Communists =

Defunct Syria-based Palestinian organization

League of Palestinian Communists (Arabic: عصبة الشيوعيين الفلسطينيين) was a small Palestinian communist group in Syria. It was formed by Palestinian communists that did not join the Palestinian Communist Party when it was reorganized in 1982.

The League published عائدون (Returning). The group withered away by the mid 1980s.
