= National Resistance Brigades =

Armed wing of the Democratic Front for the Liberation of Palestine

National Resistance Brigades كتائب المقاومة الوطنية
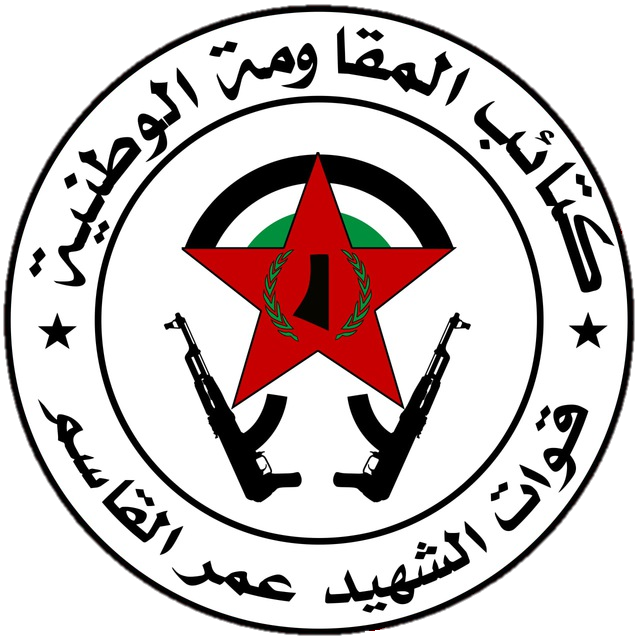
- Other name: Omar Al-Qasim Forces Arabic: قوات الشهيد عمر القاسم, lit. 'Forces of the Martyr Omar Al-Qasim'
- Founding leader: Nayef Hawatmeh
- Leader: Abu Khaled (spokesman)
- Founded: 2000
- Dates active: 2000–present
- Country: Palestine
- Headquarters: Gaza Strip
- Ideology: Palestinian nationalism; Communism; Secularism; Left-wing nationalism; Anti-Zionism; Marxism–Leninism; Maoism
- Status: Active
- Part of: Democratic Front for the Liberation of Palestine; Palestinian Joint Operations Room

The National Resistance Brigades (Arabic: كتائب المقاومة الوطنية, romanized: Katāʼib al-Muqāwamah al-Waṭanīyah), also known as Martyr Omar Al-Qassem Forces, (Arabic: قوات الشهيد عمر القاسم) are the military wing of the Democratic Front for the Liberation of Palestine, which operates in Gaza and conducts guerilla warfare. Abu Khaled is one of its commanders.

== History ==
The Democratic Front for the Liberation of Palestine was formed in 1969 but the National Resistance Brigades were established in late September 2000. The group was initially known as the Red Star Brigades, before being renamed the Palestinian National Resistance Battalions during the Second Intifada. They remain committed to a non-intervention policy in the domestic affairs of any Arab country.

In August 2001, Palestinian security forces Amin Abu Hatab, aged 26, and Hisham Abu Jamus, aged 24, carried out an attack on an Israeli army base. They killed three Israeli soldiers. In 2005, they reorganized before the Israeli disengagement from Gaza and took part in firing rockets and mortars against Israeli areas inside Gaza's borders.

In October 2007, they signed an agreement with other Palestinian factions, including Fatah's al-Aqsa Martyrs' Brigades, and between 2010 and 2011 they carried out attacks with the Palestinian Islamic Jihad. On 26 September they shelled Sderot with the al-Aqsa Martyrs' Brigades, which they said was a response to Israeli crimes against Palestinians in the West Bank and Gaza. They took part in the 2014 Gaza War, and their spokesman Abu Khaled reported in an interview that 25 members of the National Resistance Brigades had been killed, including media officer Youssef Al-Wasifi. He reported that 750 rockets and mortar shells had been fired by the brigades at Israeli settlements, 20 sniper operations had been carried out, and that they had killed at least 8 Israeli soldiers in video-recorded operations. In May 2017 they conducted a joint exercise with the Abdul al-Qadir al-Husseini Brigades at a military training site in the Gaza Strip to display new artillery and missile tactics.

On 30 March 2018, 'Abd al-Qader Mardi and Suliman al-Hawajri, members of the National Resistance Brigades, were killed during the Great Return March but didn't participate in hostilities. In 2020 they expanded their online presence and they promoted their militant activity on Telegram.

In February 2023, they announced that they bombed Israeli communities bordering the Gaza Strip in response to Israeli strikes, and in April they bombed the city of Ashkelon.

=== Gaza War ===
The National Resistance Brigades participated in the 2023 Hamas-led October 7 attacks against Israel. On 7 October they claimed to have lost three fighters in combat with the Israel Defence Forces (IDF), and on 8 October they were engaged with Israeli forces in "Kfar Aza", "Be'eri", and "Kissufim".

On February 19, 2024, their spokesperson Abu Khaled announced that during the attack, the National Resistance Brigades had carried out more than 400 operations, including 100 armed clashes, targeting 25 vehicles, sniping 5 soldiers, firing 110 rocket salvoes, targeting 160 positions with mortars, and shooting down Israeli drones. He also stated that 37 fighters had been killed during the war, including on October 7 and from airstrikes, and others had been arrested or were missing.

Since the start of the subsequent Israeli invasion of the Gaza Strip, the National Resistance Brigades have participated in subsequent fighting against the IDF throughout the Gaza Strip, alongside Hamas' al-Qassam Brigades and other allied Palestinian factions.

On 19 of October 2025 the BBC reported about Mahmoud Amin Ya'qub al-Muhtadi, a member of the organization who participated in October 7 attacks, alongside Hamas. He was arrested in Louisiana, after arriving to the US a year earlier with a fraudulent visa. According to the report he was charged with "providing, attempting to provide or conspiring to provide material support to a foreign terrorist organization, and the fraud and misuse of a visa or other documents". The report also stated that a few hours after the attack started on October 7, his phone connected to a cell tower near Kibbutz Kfar Aza, where a massacre took place.
