= 2021–22 Palestinian local elections =

Election in the Palestinian territories

- December 11, 2021; March 26, 2022
- Local authorities (West Bank only)

On 11 December 2021, local elections were held in Palestine. 154 towns and villages in the West Bank voted in municipal polls in the first phase, but there were no elections in the Gaza Strip. On 26 March 2022, municipal elections were held in 73 localities of West Bank.

== Background ==
On 6 September, the Palestinian Authority decided to hold the elections for the West Bank and the Gaza Strip. The Central Elections Commission announced that they would take place in two phases. The first phase was scheduled to be held on 11 December 2021 for 387 municipalities and village councils in West Bank and Gaza, with elections in 90 other localites to be held later. It stated that the elections in Gaza could only be held if Hamas gave political approval for it.

The elections took place amid a tense atmosphere between Fatah and Hamas over the postponement of more major elections that were also scheduled for 2021. It was also reported that voters were angry with the postponement of the presidential election and the legislative election by President Mahmoud Abbas. Hamas announced that it would boycott the elections unless the Palestinian Authority agreed to hold the general elections as well. As it barred the elections from taking place in Gaza, the elections there were postponed to the second phase which was scheduled for 26 March 2022 in 66 councils. As a result, the first phase was scheduled to be held only in West Bank.

Voter registration for the first phase of the elections opened on 3 October 2021 and closed on 7 October. A total of 702,000 citizens were registered as being eligible for voting. Registration for candidates began on 26 October and concluded on 4 November. The electoral campaigning began on 27 November and concluded on 9 December. 61 localities where no elections were held in the first phase were included in the second phase, bringing the total to 127 localities including 25 in the Gaza Strip. Elections were not scheduled to be held in refugee camps in West Bank or East Jerusalem. Hamas in January 2022 again prohibited holding the elections in Gaza. Voter registration for the second phase began on 8 January and concluded on 12 January. A total of 787,000 voters were registered. The registration for candidates in the second phase was opened on 8 February and concluded on 17 February. The campaigning period began on 12 March and concluded on 24 March.

== Participants ==
The Central Elections Commission announced that 6,299 candidates were nominated including 1,599 women candidates. They belonged to 765 lists overall, including 277 affiliated with political parties and 488 independent ones. For the first phase, a total of 4,880 candidates, including 1,551 women candidates, were approved. Only 154 localities submitted multiple lists, while 162 localities submitted a single list, allowing them to win by acclamation. Another 60 localities submitted no lists.

In the second phase, a total of 259 lists were submitted from 73 localities, with 178 being independent and 81 being affiliated to political parties. 50 localities submitted multiple lists, while 23 submitted only a single list and 28 submitted none. A total of 2,537 candidates were nominated, including 678 women. Hamas boycotted both the phases and did not allow the elections to be held in the Gaza Strip. Many supporters and members of the movement however participated as independents and also joined with the Popular Front for the Liberation of Palestine in 25 localities in the second phase. The Palestinian Islamic Jihad also indicated that it would not participate in the elections. Fatah candidates ran under the bloc named "Construction and Liberation".

== Opinion polls ==
=== Round 1 ===
Date	Pollster	Sample size	Fatah	Hamas	Others	Undecided	DK/NA
14–23 October 2021	PCPSR	1,800	41%	27.1%	7.2%	14.0%	7.6%

=== Round 2 ===
Date	Pollster	Sample size	Fatah	Hamas	Others	Undecided	DK/NA
8–11 December 2021	PCPSR	1,270	38% (Note: West Bank)	30%	-	-	-
8–11 December 2021	PCPSR	1,270	29% (Note: Gaza Strip)	47%	-	-	-
14–23 October 2021	PCPSR	1,800	35.4%	35.4%	10.5%	13.0%	4.5%

== Results ==
=== First phase ===
According to the Central Elections Commission the turnout for the first phase was 64.79%, with 268,318 out of a total 405,687 eligible voters casting their ballots for 1,503 seats in 154 localities. 1.01% of votes were cast as white ballots while 2.43% were declared as invalid. 70.86% seats up for election were won by independent lists and 29.14% were won by candidates of political parties. Candidates won by acclamation in 162 localities. 21.8% of the overall winning candidates were women.

=== Second phase ===
The turnout for the second phase was 53.69% per the Central Elections Commission, with around 380,000 out of a total 715,413 eligible voters casting their ballots for 632 seats in 50 localities. 1% of votes were cast as white ballots while 2% were declared as invalid. 64.4% seats up for election were won by independent lists and 35.5% were won by candidates of political parties. Candidates won by acclamation in 23 localities. 19% of the overall winning candidates were women. Among partisan lists, Fatah won 217 seats either on its own or as part of coalition lists, while the Popular Front for the Liberation of Palestine won five seats, the Palestinian Popular Struggle Front and Palestinian National Initiative won four seats each, and the Democratic Front for the Liberation of Palestine won one seat.
