= Jordanian Communist Toilers Party =

Jordanian Communist Toilers Party حزب الشغّيلة الشيوعية الأردني
- Founded: 1997
- Dissolved: 2008
- Split from: Jordanian Communist Party
- Merged into: Jordanian Communist Party
- Headquarters: Amman
- Ideology: Communism; Marxism-Leninism

Jordanian Communist Toilers Party (in Arabic: حزب الشغّيلة الشيوعية الأردني, romanized: Hizb al-Shaghghilah al-Shuyu'iyah al-Urduni) was a communist political party in Jordan. The party was founded in 1997, through a split in the Jordanian Communist Party (JCP). The party used the name Jordanian Communist Party until it registered with the Jordanian authorities with the name Jordanian Communist Toilers Party. The party was considered more orthodox in its ideology than JCP. It reunited with the JCP in 2008.

== See also ==
- List of political parties in Jordan
