= Palestinian Democratic Union =

Palestinian political party

Palestinian Democratic Union الاتحاد الديمقراطي الفلسطيني
- Leader: Saleh Ra'fat
- Founder: Yasser Abd Rabbo
- Founded: September 1991
- Split from: Democratic Front for the Liberation of Palestine
- Headquarters: Palestine
- Ideology: Scientific socialism Secularism; Progressivism; Two-state solution
- Political position: Left-wing
- National affiliation: Palestine Liberation Organization; Democratic Alliance List

The Palestinian Democratic Union (Arabic: الاتحاد الديمقراطي الفلسطيني Al-Ittihad al-Dimuqrati al-Filastini), generally known as FIDA (Arabic: فدا) is a small Palestinian political party active in the Palestine Liberation Organization (PLO) and the Palestinian National Authority (PNA).

== History ==
FIDA emerged as a split from the Democratic Front for the Liberation of Palestine (DFLP) due to disputes in the early 1990s about the policies towards Jordan, the Oslo peace process and the First Intifada. In September 1991, the party approved its political program. In April 1993, it adopted the name Palestinian Democratic Union – FIDA.

== Organisation ==
The youth wing of FIDA is known as Independence Youth Union (Arabic: اتحاد شباب الاستقلال Athad Shebab Alasetqelal); there are also workers' and women's groups. FIDA has no armed wing, in contrast to the DFLP and several other Palestinian organizations.

== Beliefs and ideology ==
The slogan of FIDA is "freedom, independence, return, democracy and socialism". It presents itself as a progressive, secular and democratic socialist party, and espouses the Marxist vocabulary of "scientific socialism".

FIDA took a more moderate stance than the main DFLP (led by Nayef Hawatmeh and based in Damascus, Syria) towards the Israeli-Palestinian conflict, and has tried to establish itself as a left-wing democratic alternative in Palestinian politics. It advocates a two-state solution based on the borders of 1967 and with East Jerusalem as the capital of an independent Palestinian state. A prominent FIDA leader, Mamduh Nofal, in 2002 signed an appeal to stop suicide bombings.

The party has held two National Conferences, the first in Jericho in 1995 and the second in 2000.

== FIDA leadership ==
FIDA was founded by Yasser Abd Rabbo, a pro-peace moderate, who then represented the organization in the Palestine Liberation Organization's (PLO) Executive Committee, where he worked as an advisor to Yassir Arafat.

In 2002, he resigned from the party after internal disputes. Women's rights activist Zahira Kamal had been chosen in an internal election to replace him as minister in the government of the Palestinian National Authority (PNA), but Abd Rabbo refused to step down, and instead left the party. He was then able to remain in the cabinet as an independent, with the backing of Arafat, but was replaced in FIDA by Saleh Ra'fat, the current Secretary-General. Zahira Kamal remains in FIDA, but outside of government. Other important FIDA leaders include Azmi ash-Shu'aybi and Mamduh Nofal.

== Electoral participation ==
FIDA has 21 members in the PLO's Palestine National Council (PNC). They were elected as DFLP delegates, or appointed to serve as delegates from various PLO branches, at the last PNC in 1988. No new elections have been held since.

FIDA took part in the 1996 elections to the Palestinian Legislative Council (PLC), and with Fatah backing managed to gain one seat, held by Azmi ash-Shu'aybi. Ash-Shu'aybi has been campaigning for greater parliamentary control of the executive authority and greater transparency in the Palestinian National Authority (PNA).

In the January 2006 PLC elections, FIDA was part of the al-Badeel (Alternative) joint list, with the DFLP and the Palestinian People's Party (PPP). The list received 2.8% of the popular vote and won two of the PLC's 132 seats.

FIDA will participate in the 2021 Palestinian legislative election on a joint list with the PPP called "United Left". The list is led by Fadwa Khader, a member of the PPP's politburo.

== See also ==
- List of political parties in the Palestinian National Authority
