= Bassam as-Salhi =

Palestinian politician (born 1960)

- بسام الصالحي
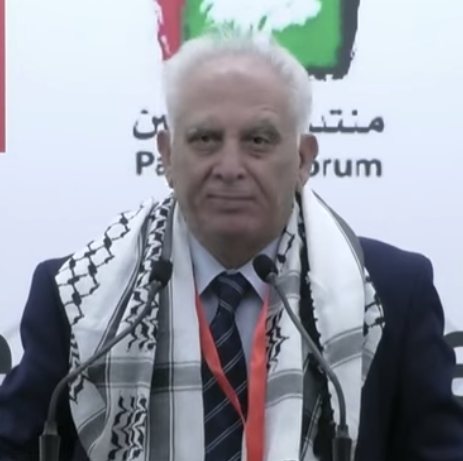
- Speaking in 2025

Secretary-General of the Palestinian People's Party
- Incumbent
- Assumed office 2003
- Preceded by: Hannah Amireh, Abdel Majid Hamadan, Mustafa Barghouti

Minister of Culture
- In office 17 March 2007 – 14 June 2007
- Prime Minister: Ismail Haniyeh
- Preceded by: Attallah Abul Sabeh
- Succeeded by: Ibrahim Abrash

Member of the Palestinian Legislative Council
- Incumbent
- Assumed office 18 February 2006
- Constituency: The Alternative List

Personal details
- Born: 1960 (age 65–66) Al-Am'ari, Jordanian-administered West Bank, Palestine
- Party: Palestinian People's Party
- Other political affiliations: The Alternative
- Education: Birzeit University (BA, MA)
- Occupation: Politician

Bassam as-Salhi (Arabic: بسام الصالحي; born 1960) is a Palestinian politician and the Secretary-General of the Palestinian People's Party (PPP), a left-wing political party, since 2003. Born in the Al-Am'ari Refugee Camp near Ramallah to a family originally from Lydda, as-Salhi was elected to the Palestinian Legislative Council in the 2006 general election through the party-list of The Alternative. He briefly served as Minister of Culture of the Palestinian National Authority in 2007 during the Second Haniyeh Government.

== Early life and education ==
He was elected chairman of the Student Council at Birzeit University from 1979 to 1981 and was a representative for the student movement on the National Guidance Committee.

As-Salhi has a Bachelor's degree in Sociology and a Master's degree in International Relations from Birzeit University.

== Activism and imprisonment ==
As-Salhi's political activism began during the First Intifada. He was arrested multiple times by Israeli authorities and placed under house arrest. He led the underground activities of the PPP in the Gaza Strip. After the Gaza Strip's closure in 1988, he secretly returned to the West Bank and worked with the Unified National Leadership of the Intifada. His involvement in the Intifada led to his imprisonment in 1990.

== Political career ==
In 2003, as-Salhi was elected Secretary-General of the Palestinian People's Party (PPP). As-Salhi was part of the Palestinian delegation to the International Court of Justice in 2004, where he addressed the Israeli construction of a separation barrier in the occupied West Bank.

As-Salhi ran as the PPP candidate in the 2005 Palestinian Authority presidential elections. In the 2006 Palestinian legislative elections, he was elected as one of two deputies from The Alternative bloc. In 2007, he briefly served as the Minister of Culture in the Palestinian National Unity Government, before the unity government disbanded.

In May 2018, as-Salhi was elected to the Executive Committee of the Palestine Liberation Organization (PLO).

Party political offices
Preceded by Hannah Amireh, Abdel Majid Hamadan, Mustafa Barghouti	Secretary-General of the Palestinian People's Party; 2003–present	Incumbent
Political offices
Preceded by Attallah Abul Sabeh	Minister of Culture; 2007	Succeeded by Ibrahim Abrash
