= 1980 Hebron attack =

Terrorist massacre of Jews in 1980

- Part of the Israeli-Palestinian conflict
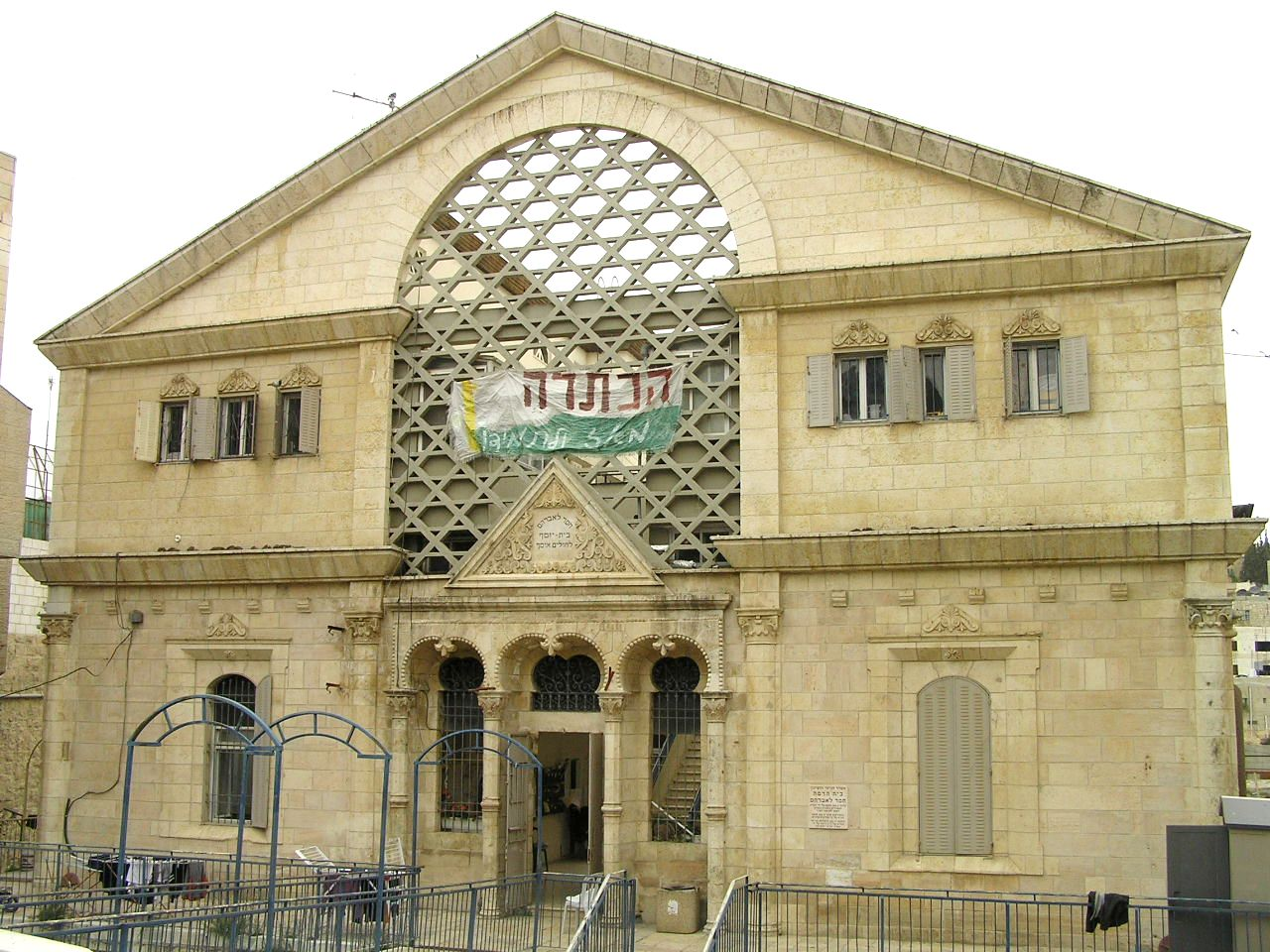
- Beit Hadassah in Hebron, location of the terrorist attack

- The attack site
- Location: Hebron
- Date: 2 May 1980; 46 years ago
- Attack type: Ambush
- Weapons: Rifles and grenades
- Deaths: 3 Israeli, 2 American, 1 Canadian civilians
- Injuries: 20 Israeli and American civilians
- Perpetrator: Fatah
- No. of participants: 4 Palestinians

On 2 May 1980, six Jews – three Israelis, two American Israelis, and one Canadian – were killed, and another 20 Jews were injured at 7:30 pm on a Friday night as they returned home from Sabbath prayer services at the Cave of the Patriarchs in Hebron. Five of the six killed were yeshiva students aged 20–21. They were attacked with gunfire and grenades from the rooftops around a small alley.

It was the most deadly attack on the Israeli occupied West Bank since the Six-Day War.

== Context ==
The attack, unprecedented in the post-1967 period, was understood to mark a transition from "hit-and-run" attacks to attacks aiming to achieve mass casualties by the use of military tactics and careful planning.

== Attack ==
The attack was carefully planned in military style. The assailants had studied the route and timing of the return of worshipers to the Jewish residence in the former Hadassah medical clinic (Beit Hadassah) on Friday evenings, and attacked from both street and rooftop level as soon as the Jews appeared in the narrow passageway. One of the assailants, Adnan Jabar was posted on the roof of a building opposite the Hadassah medical clinic holding a Kalashnikov with which he "opened fire" as soon as the Jewish pedestrians came into view. Israeli guards at the former clinic immediately returned fire. Perpetrators admitted to having received instructions directly from Khalil al-Wazir. Israel sent a protest note to the United Nations, arguing that "this criminal incident illustrates once again the true character of the PLO and its violent aims".

== Legal proceedings ==
=== Investigation ===
An extensive cache of explosives and weapons was discovered; it included the guns used in the attack.

=== Arrests ===
In September 1980, four members of Fatah were arrested and charged with carrying out the attack. One of the four had trained in the Soviet Union. Two were arrested while trying to cross from Israel into Jordan.

An additional six Arab Palestinians were taken into custody, charged with aiding the terrorists by providing lodging and transportation.

=== Trial and sentencing ===
All four assailants were sentenced to life in prison, but were later released in prisoner exchanges.

== Victims ==
- Tzvi Glatt, 20, American-Israeli yeshiva student at the Mercaz HaRav yeshiva in Jerusalem. A budding scholar, Glatt was the author of "Rise From the Dust".
- Shmuel Mermelstein, 21, yeshiva student from Montreal who was studying at Yeshivat Kerem B'Yavneh. He was the only victim without Israeli citizenship.
- Gershon Klein, 20, yeshiva student at the Nir Yeshiva in Kiryat Arba.
- Hanan Krauthamer, 21, from Bnei Brak, French-Israeli yeshiva student at the Nir Yeshiva.
- Yaakov Zimmerman, 20, from Bnei Brak, yeshiva student at the Nir Yeshiva.
- Eli HaZeev, 32, an ultranationalist settler who was a Vietnam veteran, had converted to Judaism and was associated with Meir Kahane's Kach Movement.

Glatt and Marmelstein were visiting friends at Kiryat Arba when the attack occurred.

Four of the wounded were American citizens: Mordechai Shevat, 21, of The Bronx; Robert Brosovsky, 21; Simha Wollman, 21, of Brooklyn, and Lisa Sherman, 20, of Queens.

== Assailants ==
All of the assailants were members of Fatah.

=== Members of the ambush squad ===
- Yasser Hussein Mohammed Zedat (30), squad leader. From Hebron; fled to Jordan after firing a Katyusha rocket at Kiryat Arba in April 1977; trained in terrorist tactics in Lebanon.
- Adnan Jabar (32), second in command. Underwent 6 months of intensive training in small arms, explosives, military tactics, and ideology in Skhodnya, Soviet Union in 1974 in a program where Fatah and Popular Front for the Liberation of Palestine militants trained together. He had also trained in Syria and Lebanon.
- Tayseer Abu Sneineh (30). Elected Mayor of Hebron in 2017.
- Mohammed Shubaki (32). Farmer. Accused in a 1979 shooting murder of an Israeli couple.

== Accomplices ==
- Omar Haroub (30). Accused of providing weapons and transportation on the night of the ambush. A chemistry graduate of the University of Beirut working for a blood bank in East Jerusalem.

== Impact ==
The attack prompted the government of Menachem Begin to refurbish the Hadassah medical clinic and to permit Jews to live in the Beit Hason and Beit Schneerson buildings adjacent to it.

The Israeli community of Beit Hagai (House of Haggai) was established in 1982 by former classmates of boys murdered in this attack. In addition to being the name of a Biblical Prophet, Haggai, is an acronym of the given names Hanan Krauthamer, Gershon Klein, and Yaakov Zimmerman, the three Nir Yeshiva (Kiryat Arba) students killed in an attack on 2 May 1980.
