= Saleh Ra'fat =

- صـــالـــح رأفــــت
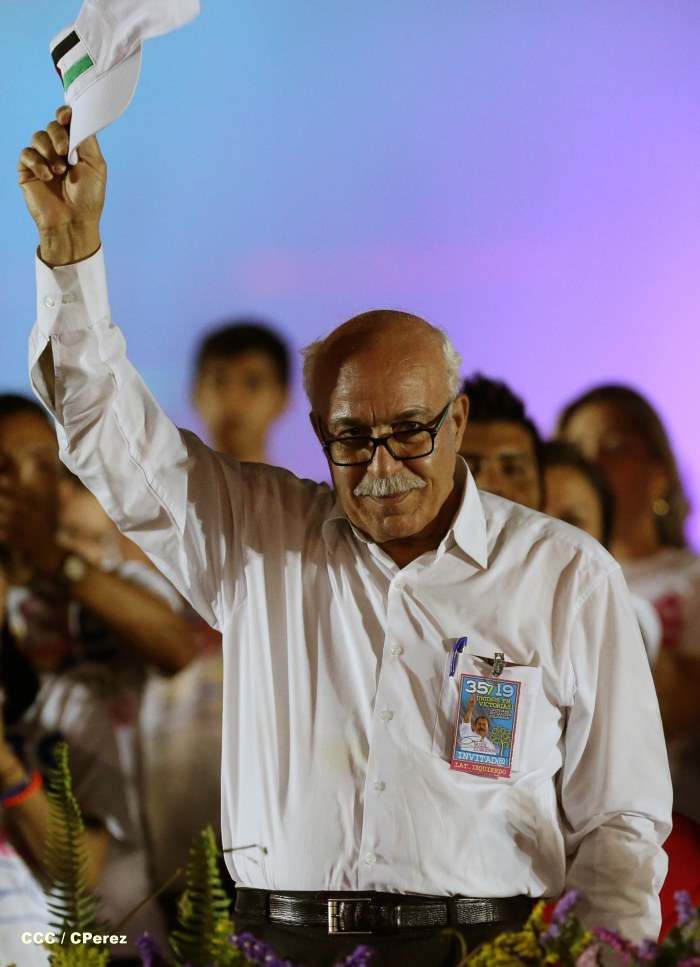
- Ra'fat in 2017

Member of the Executive Committee of the Palestine Liberation Organization

Personal details
- Born: 1945 (age 80–81) Arraba, Mandatory Palestine

Saleh Ra'fat (born 1945) is a member of the executive committee of the Palestinian Liberation Organisation and a member of the Democratic Front for the Liberation of Palestine.

== Biography ==
Ra'fat was born in Arraba, Mandatory Palestine, in 1945. He became a member of the Arab Nationalist Movement and headed its Jenin organization.
