= Zahira Kamal =

Palestinian activist and politician

- زاهيرا كمال
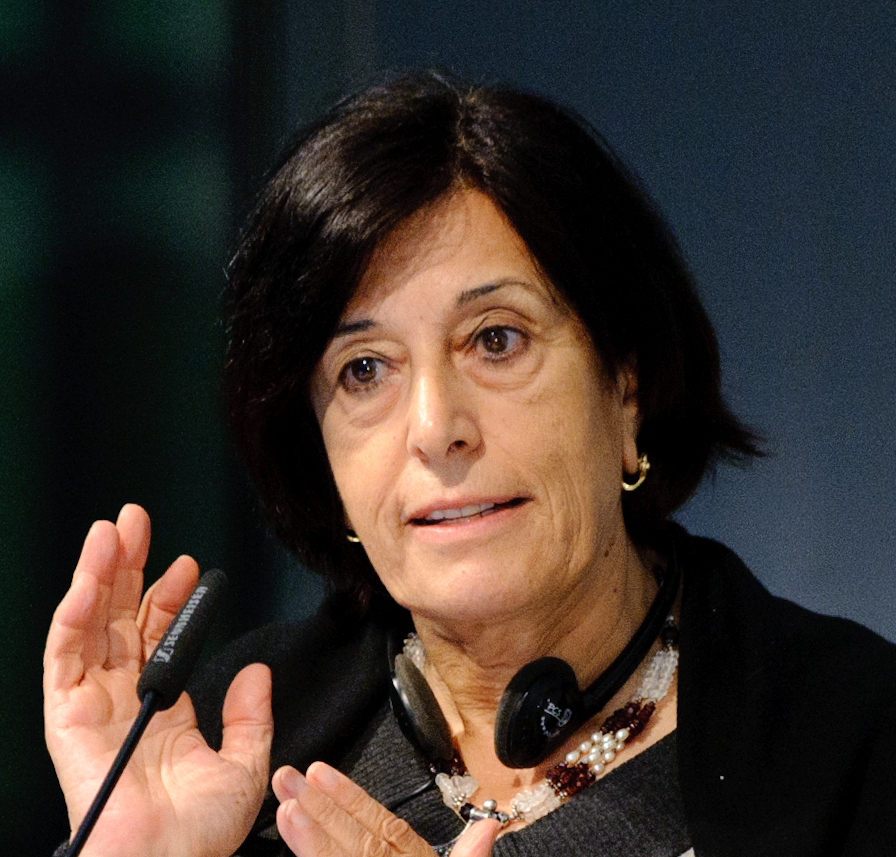
- Zahira Kamal in 2010

Minister of Women Affairs of Palestine
- In office 12 November 2003 – 29 March 2006
- Preceded by: Office established
- Succeeded by: Maryam Saleh

Personal details
- Born: 1945 (age 80–81) Wadi al-Joz, East Jerusalem, Mandatory Palestine
- Party: Palestinian Democratic Union
- Education: Ain Shams University, University of Jordan, University of Leicester
- Occupation: Activist, politician

Zahira Kamal (Arabic: زاهيرا كمال; born 1945) is a Palestinian activist and politician of the Palestinian Democratic Union. From 2003 to 2006 she served as the Minister of Women Affairs in the Palestinian National Authority. Zahira was the first female leader of a Palestinian political party. She was detained for six years under town arrest, the longest time any woman has been held under town arrest.

== Biography ==
Zahira was born in 1945 in Wadi al-Joz, East Jerusalem, Mandatory Palestine. She is the oldest of eight siblings. She received her Bachelor degree from the Ain Shams University in Cairo, Egypt. She returned to Jerusalem after her time in Egypt. She worked at the Women’s Teacher Training College. She completed further studies at the University of Jordan and the University of Leicester in England. In 1979 she was arrested and placed under town arrest for six months for her links with leftist Palestinian organization, then she was further detained in town arrest from 1980 to 1986. She worked in the 1990s in peace negotiations between Israel and Palestine, one of three women to be involved in the negotiations (Hanan Ashrawi and Suad Amiry were the others). From 1992 to 1997 she served in the Women’s Affairs Technical Committee as an coordinator. She was the General Director of the UNESCO project Palestinian Women’s Research and Documentation Centre. She served as the Minister of Women Affairs in the Palestinian Cabinet, the first one to hold that Ministerial portfolio. She established the Gender Planning and Development Directorate in the Palestinian Ministry of Planning. She is member of boards in International Women’s Commission for a Just and Sustainable Palestinian-Israeli Peace, Women's Center For Legal Aid and Counseling, Women Studies Centre based in Jerusalem and the Palestinian Businesswomen’s Association. She is the General Secretary of the Palestinian Democratic Union.
