= Jordanian Communist Party =

Political party in Jordan

Jordanian Communist Party الحزب الشیوعی الاردني
- Abbreviation: JCP
- Leader: Saud Qubailat
- Founded: 1951
- Headquarters: Amman
- Ideology: Communism; Marxism–Leninism
- Political position: Far-left
- International affiliation: IMCWP
- House of Representatives: 0 / 138
- Senate: 0 / 65

Party flag

Website
- www.cpjo.net

The Jordanian Communist Party (JCP; Arabic: الحزب الشیوعی الاردنی, romanized: al-Hizb al-Shuyu'i al-Urduni) is a Marxist-Leninist party in Jordan, founded in 1951. Its current general secretary is Saud Qubailat. It publishes al-Jamahir (الجماهير, lit. "The Masses").

== History ==
In June 1952, the Palestinian communists in the West Bank, then organized in the Palestinian National Liberation League, joined JCP. During the years to come the main stronghold of the party was in the West Bank, and the party leadership was predominantly Palestinian. Prior to the merger into JCP, the Palestinian communists had opposed the annexation of the West Bank by Jordan. However, in 1951, that policy was reversed and JCP recognized the West Bank as part of Jordan.

The main leaders during the initial period were Fu'ad Nassar, Fahmi al-Salfiti and Fa'iq Warrad. The party gained influence amongst urban intellectuals in Nablus and Jerusalem. In particular, the party developed a strong position in the Salfit village outside of Nablus, from where many prominent JCP leaders hailed. Other areas in which the party was active were Ramallah, Bethlehem and amongst refugees near Jericho. The main party organ was al-Muqawamah ash-Shabiya (المقاومة الشعبية, "People's Resistance"), a monthly publication.

The party faced harsh repression from the Jordanian state. On 29 December 1951, Fu'ad Nasser was arrested. He was sentenced to ten years' imprisonment. In 1953, a legislation was passed that ordered forced labor for JCP cadres. However, the party continued to work in a clandestine way.

The party built up mass organizations, such as the Democratic Youth Association and the Peace Partisans. In May 1954, it formed the National Front, through which the party took part in the elections that year. In that election the National Front won one parliamentary seat, Abd al-Qadir Salih from Nablus.

The party reached the peak of its influence in 1956–1957, following the Suez Crisis and during the mobilizations against the Anglo-Jordanian Treaty. In the 1956 elections, the National Front won three seats. Salih retained his seat, and Fa'iq Warrad won in Ramallah and Yaqub Ziyadin won a seat in Jerusalem. Following the elections, there was a brief opening for the party. Salih was appointed as Minister of Agriculture in the government of Nablusi. Prisoners, like Fu'ad Nassar, were released from jail. The party press could be circulated openly. Its main opponent at the time was the Ba'ath Party, which also sought to make inroads amongst the secular sectors.

The opening would however become very short. In January 1957, Hussein of Jordan harshly attacked the party and the communists were accused of collaborating with Israel. Ziyadin and Warrad were arrested by the government after having their parliamentary immunities removed. They were sentenced to 19 and 16 years' imprisonment respectively. The party activities nearly halted, except for internal cadre schooling and publication of al-Muqawamah ash-Shabiya.

In the mid 1960s, the United States Department of State estimated the party membership to be approximately 500.

At the same time, the party suffered from internal divisions. The acting General Secretary in Amman, Fahmi al-Salfiti led the right wing sections of the party. He favored collaboration with the Hashemite dynasty. He vehemently opposed guerrilla struggle and expressed a will that King Hussein would take the leading role in the struggle against Israel. The al-Salfiti fraction supported Resolution 242 of the United Nations Security Council. Al-Salfiti was opposed by the exiled leadership, led by the party general secretary Fu'ad Nassar.

After the Six-Day War (5–10 June 1967), the party organization in the West Bank was led by Na'im al-Ashhab, Suleiman Al Najjab, 'Arabi 'Awwad and later, Bashir Barghuti. In the West Bank, the party started publishing al-Watan (الوطن, "The Fatherland"). Under al-Ashhab's rule, the West Bank communists remained cautious of armed struggle, claiming that it was premature under existing conditions. However the changed political scenario in the West Bank would force the local activists to review their stands. The pro-Jordanian positions of the party and its ambiguity towards the armed struggle were becoming more and more problematic. The West Bank communists moved closer to the Palestinian liberation movement. By 1973, the West Bank communists supported the formation of an independent Palestinian state of the West Bank and Gaza. These developments strained the relations between the West Bank communists and their formal leadership in Amman.

In exile, Fu'ad Nassar built up an armed militia for the Palestinian communists, the al-Ansar Forces, in March 1970. In theory the al-Ansar Forces would remain under the supervision of the JCP, the Syrian Communist Party and the Iraqi Communist Party. In practice, the group would not play a major role, largely due to the passivity and betrayal of the JCP. By 1975, the structure was disbanded.

In 1975, the West Bank communists split in two separate organizations. The pro-Salfiti branch formed the Palestinian Communist Youth Organization. The group which remained in JCP was reorganized as the "Palestinian Communist Organization", which achieved autonomous status within JCP.

On 10 February 1982, after much debate, the Palestinian Communist Organization was separated from JCP. The Palestinian Communist Party was constituted as a separate party, merging the JCP branch in the West Bank and the Palestinian Communist Organization in Gaza.

The JCP remained illegal until 1993.

In May 2006, the party organized a "Unity Conference of Jordanian Communists", merging sectors that had left the party. However, the main splinter group, the Jordanian Communist Toilers Party, did not attend. They eventually did reunite in 2008.
