= Majida Al-Masri =

Palestinian politician

Majida al-Masri
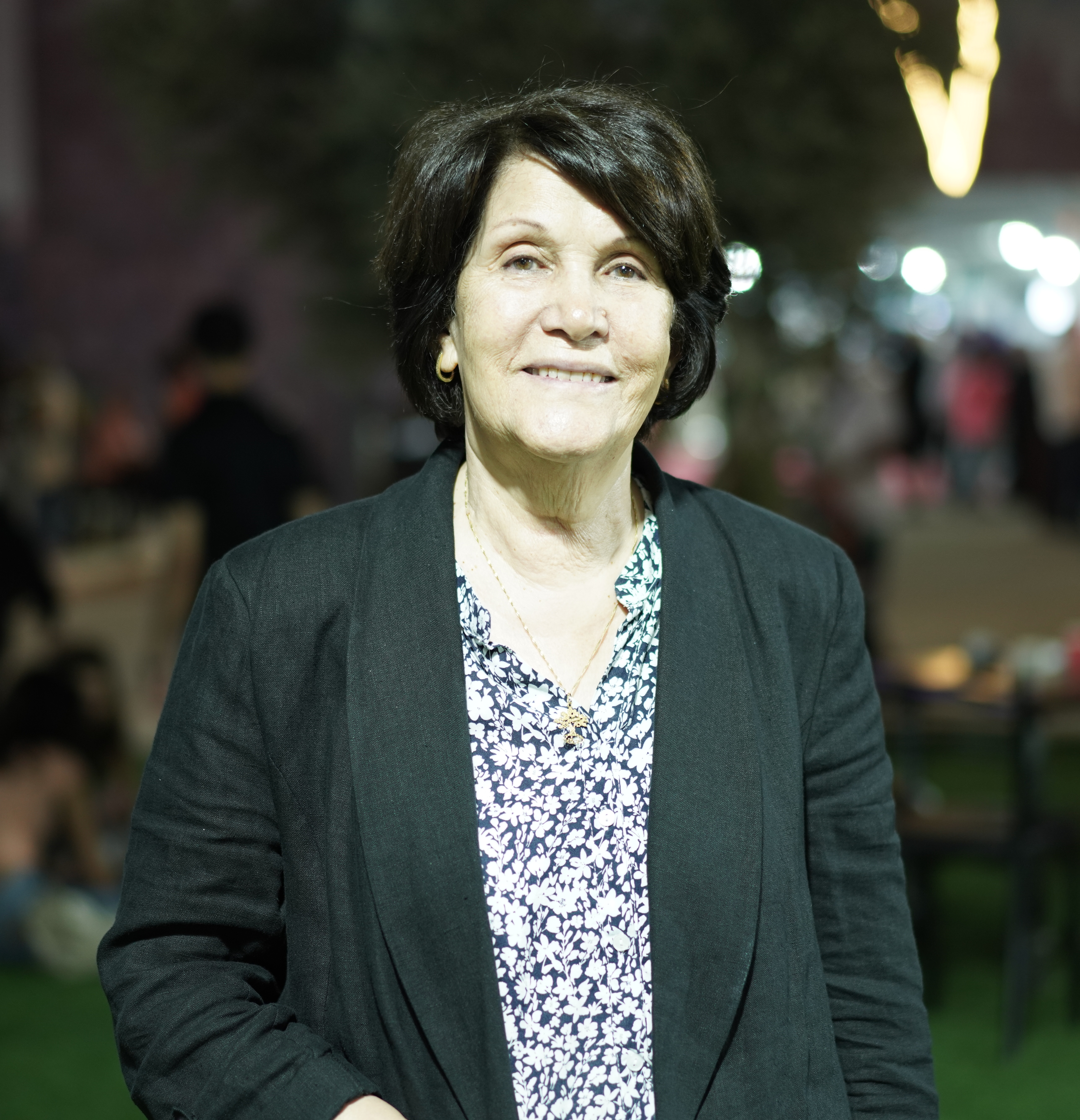

Minister of Social Affairs of the Palestinian National Authority
- Incumbent
- Assumed office May 12, 2009

Member of the Palestinian Legislative Council
- Constituency: Nablus

Personal details
- Party: Democratic Front for the Liberation of Palestine
- Occupation: Politician

Majida al-Masri (Arabic: ماجدة المصري, full name: ماجدة محمد حمدي راغب المصري) is a Palestinian politician. She is a politburo member of the Democratic Front for the Liberation of Palestine. and a leader of the DFLP in the Nablus area.

In the 2006 parliamentary election, al-Masri was a candidate in the Nablus electoral district. She got 14,568 votes, but was not elected. On May 12, 2009, she was appointed Minister of Social Affairs in the Palestinian National Authority's caretaker cabinet of Salam Fayyad. She was the first minister in the PNA to condemn Palestinian President Mahmoud Abbas's decision to delay the United Nations Human Rights Council vote on the Goldstone report which condemned Israel for its actions in the Gaza War in January 2009. She said the government's decision "gave Israeli war criminals the opportunity to avoid the report's repercussions," "contradicts the Palestinian national consensus," and "angered friends and allies of the Palestinian people."
