= Nayef Hawatmeh =

Jordanian politician (born 1938)

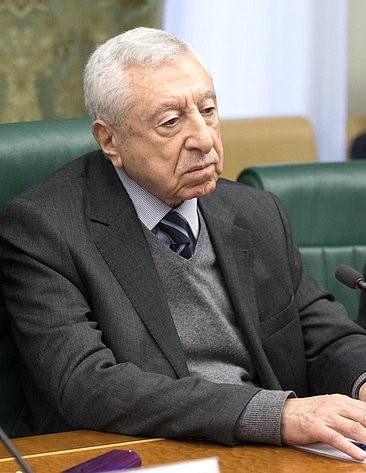
- Hawatmeh in 2017

General Secretary of the Democratic Front for the Liberation of Palestine
- Incumbent
- Assumed office 1969

Personal details
- Born: 17 November 1938 (age 87) Al-Salt, Emirate of Transjordan
- Party: DFLP
- Other political affiliations: Arab Nationalist Movement (before 1963); National Liberation Front (Yemen) (1963–1967); Popular Front for Liberation of Palestine (1968–1969)
- Occupation: Political activist
- Religion: Greek Catholicism

Nayef Hawatmeh (Note: Also variously romanized as Naif Hawatma and Nayif Hawatme) (Arabic: نايف حواتمة, romanized: Nāyef Ḥawātmeh; Kunya: Abu an-Nuf; born 17 November 1938) is a Jordanian politician who is the head of the Democratic Front for the Liberation of Palestine.

== Biography ==
Hawatmeh hails from a Jordanian clan and is a practicing Greek Catholic. He has been the General Secretary of the Marxist Democratic Front for the Liberation of Palestine (DFLP) since its formation in a 1969 split from the Popular Front for the Liberation of Palestine (PFLP), of which he was also a founder. At the time, he was characterized as a Maoist, and was satirically referred to as "Nayef Zedong". He was active as a leader in the Arab Nationalist Movement (ANM), which preceded the PFLP.

He presently resides in exile in Syria, from which the DFLP receives some support.

Hawatmeh did not support Fatah's policy of non-interference in the host country’s internal affairs from 1969 and argued just before Black September that attacks against King Hussein's regime in Jordan had become inevitable. He opposed the 1993 Oslo Accords, calling them a "sell-out," but became more conciliatory in the late 1990s. In 1999, he agreed to meet with Yassir Arafat, who had signed the accords, and even shook hands with Israeli President Ezer Weizmann at the funeral of King Hussein of Jordan, drawing strong criticism from his Palestinian and Arab peers.

In 2004, he was briefly active in a joint Palestinian-Israeli non-governmental attempt to start a coalition of Palestinian groups supporting a two-state solution, and called for a cessation of hostilities in the al-Aqsa Intifada.

In 2007, Israel indicated it would allow him to travel to the West Bank for the first time since 1967, in order to participate in a meeting of the Palestine Liberation Organization (PLO). In the end, he decided not to travel to West Bank due to what he described as "Israeli conditions for his visit."

Although the DFLP’s support has waned for a period under Hawatmeh's general secretariat, there has been an increase in the credibility and support of the DFLP among Palestinians and in the eyes of other groups, particularly in Gaza. In Gaza on 21 February 2023, the 54th anniversary of the group’s founding, hundreds of supporters as well as many armed fighters marched, carried the party banner and symbols, and chanted DFLP anti-Zionist slogans.

In 2023, the DFLP, under Hawatmeh's leadership, joined the October 7 attacks with their paramilitary wing, the National Resistance Brigades. The DFLP acknowledged their involvement through their party news, Al Hourriah, on 8 October. The National Resistance Brigades have since fought the IDF alongside Hamas and other allied Palestinian factions in subsequent battles of the Gaza war throughout the Gaza Strip.

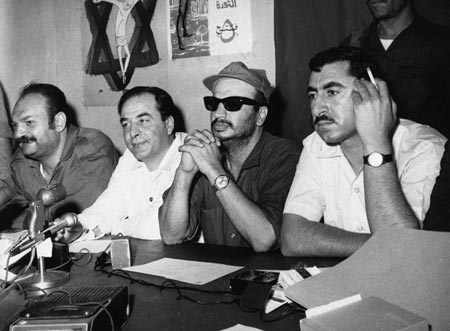
Hawatmeh (right) with Yasser Arafat and Kamal Nasser at press conference in Amman prior to Black September in Jordan.

== See also ==
- Palestine Liberation Organization
- George Habash
- Jordanian Christians
- Palestinian Christians
- Palestinian political violence

== Sources ==
- "Radical Palestinians bitter over Israel handshake". BBC News. 14 February 1999.
- "Arafat meets radical opponent". BBC News. 22 August 1999.
- "Key Palestinian exile may return". BBC News. 15 July 2007.
- "DFLP: Nayef Hawatmeh, General Secretary of the Democratic Front for the Liberation of Palestine". DFLP website. 13 October 2012. Archived from the original on 11 October 2017.
- Tucker, Spencer C.; Roberts, Priscilla (12 May 2008). "The Encyclopedia of the Arab Israeli Conflict". Bloomsbury Publishing USA. ISBN 9781851098422 – via Google Books.
