= Democratic Front for the Liberation of Palestine =

Palestinian Marxist–Leninist organization

Democratic Front for the Liberation of Palestine الجبهة الديمقراطية لتحرير فلسطين (Arabic)
- Leader: Nayef Hawatmeh
- Founder: Nayef Hawatmeh; Yasser Abed Rabbo
- Founded: 1969
- Split from: Popular Front for the Liberation of Palestine
- Headquarters: Damascus, Syria
- Youth wing: Palestinian Democratic Youth Union
- Paramilitary wing: National Resistance Brigades
- Ideology: Communism; Marxism–Leninism; Maoism; Palestinian nationalism; Left-wing nationalism; Anti-Zionism
- Political position: Far-left
- National affiliation: Palestine Liberation Organization; Democratic Alliance List
- International affiliation: Axis of Resistance
- Legislative Council: 1 / 132

Party flag

Website
- www.alhourriah.org

The Democratic Front for the Liberation of Palestine (DFLP; Arabic: الجبهة الديمقراطية لتحرير فلسطين, romanized: el-Jabha ed-Dīmūqrāṭiyya li-Taḥrīr Filasṭīn) is a secular Palestinian Marxist–Leninist and Maoist organization. It is also frequently referred to as the Democratic Front, or al-Jabha al-Dīmūqrāṭiyya (الجبهة الديمقراطية). It is a member organization of the Palestine Liberation Organization, the Alliance of Palestinian Forces and the Democratic Alliance List.

The group was founded in 1969 by Nayef Hawatmeh, splitting from the Popular Front for the Liberation of Palestine (PFLP). It maintains a paramilitary wing, the National Resistance Brigades. The DFLP's declared goal is to "create a people's democratic Palestine, where Arabs and Jews would live without discrimination, a state without classes and national oppression, a state which allows Arabs and Jews to develop their national culture."

The DFLP is well-known for the 1974 Ma'alot massacre, in which 25 schoolchildren and teachers were killed. Although the National Resistance Brigades have fighters based in both the West Bank and the Gaza Strip, these fighters have been engaged in relatively few military operations since the First Intifada, until the ongoing Gaza war (2023–present) which has seen the DFLP fight alongside Hamas and other allied Palestinian factions.

== History ==
=== Formation as the DPFLP ===
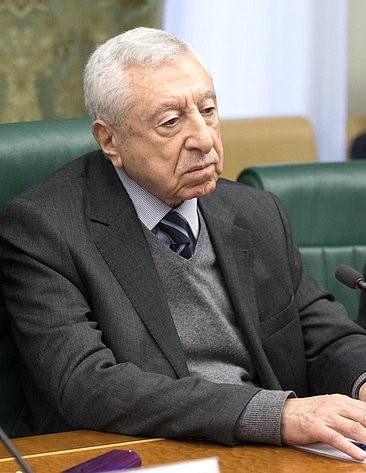
Founder and current head of the DFLP Nayef Hawatmeh, a Jordanian Christian.

The Popular Front for the Liberation of Palestine (PFLP) was established by George Habash in 1967, in the immediate aftermath of the Six-Day War. The PFLP was a Marxist–Leninist, Palestinian nationalist and Pan-Arabist organization; it advocated the destruction of the State of Israel and the establishment of a secular socialist state in Palestine. By 1968, the PFLP had joined the Palestine Liberation Organization (PLO), becoming the organization's second-largest member. The PFLP quickly developed a reputation as a violent terrorist group, launching a series of international terrorist attacks in order to draw attention to the situation in Palestine.

The Democratic Popular Front for the Liberation of Palestine (DPFLP) was established in 1969, when ideological and personal conflicts broke out within the PFLP, resulting in it fragmenting into a number of different factions. The DPFLP were joined by other sections of the Palestinian left and became the third-largest faction in the PLO. DPFLP leader Nayef Hawatmeh, a Jordanian Christian, was characterized as a Maoist by his opponents in the PDFLP, who satirically referred to him as "Nayef Zedong". As a Marxist–Leninist organization, the DPFLP initially advocated for a proletarian revolution to overthrow the State of Israel and establish a "popular democratic state" along bi-national lines.

=== War and peace process (1970s–1987) ===
PDFLP poster, the caption of which reads: "Solidarity with the people of the Middle East in their struggle against imperialism, feudalism, Zionism and Arab reaction"

The DFLP developed a close relationship with the USSR in the early 1970s, resulting in funding from the Soviet Union and Soviet-allied Arab states (South Yemen, Algeria, Libya). After 1975 the DFLP received $1 million per month from Libya. The DFLP used this aid to greatly expand its military and administrative apparatus between 1978 and 1981.

During the 1970s the DPFLP carried out a number of attacks, both against the Israel Defense Forces and against civilians. These attacks consisted of bombings, grenade attacks and kidnappings, the latter often carried out in order to negotiate a prisoner exchange with Israel. The group's largest attack was the Ma'alot massacre of 1974, an attack on an Israeli school in which 27 people were killed.

Following the Yom Kippur War, the DPFLP changed its name to the Democratic Front for the Liberation of Palestine (DFLP) and started moderating its position towards support for a two-state solution. Along with Fatah and As-Sa'iqa, the DFLP became part of the moderate faction of the PLO, which advocated for Palestinian participation in the Israeli–Palestinian peace process. Supported by Egypt and Syria, the moderates of the PLO together represented over 80% of the Palestinian fedayeen and occupied a majority on the Palestinian National Council (PNC).

The DFLP, Fatah and As-Sa'iqa submitted a proposal to the PNC that classified their goals: their strategic goal was the eventual independence of Palestine from "Zionist imperialism"; while their immediate goal was to force the State of Israel to withdraw from the Gaza Strip and the West Bank, in order to secure self-determination for the Palestinian people in those territories. The PNC adopted a similar resolution, calling for the establishment of a Palestinian National Authority in the West Bank and Gaza, while also refusing to recognise the State of Israel. During the 1977 meeting of the PNC, the DFLP expressed support for the establishment of an independent State of Palestine on territory controlled by the PLO.

=== First Intifada and split (1987–1993) ===
By the outbreak of the Southern Lebanon conflict in the mid-1980s, the DFLP stopped carrying out terrorist attacks against civilian targets and instead started conducting border raids against Israeli military positions in Southern Lebanon. During the First Intifada, the DFLP became increasingly critical of Fatah for its continued participation in the Israeli–Palestinian peace process. This caused a rise in internal tensions, as one of the DFLP's leaders Yasser Abed Rabbo expressed support for Yasser Arafat's engagement in the peace process. In 1991, Rabbo was elected as the DFLP's Secretary General and brought the organization into the peace process, causing a split within the organization. Hawatmeh's faction refused to participate in the negotiations, joining with the PFLP in order to form an anti-Arafat front organization in the Syrian capital of Damascus, where they challenged Arafat for leadership of the PLO. Rabbo ultimately left the DFLP in 1993, establishing the Palestinian Democratic Union (FIDA) and going on to participate in the 2000 Camp David Summit.

=== Oslo period (1993–2000) ===
By the time of the Oslo Accords, the dissolution of the Soviet Union had resulted in a loss of funding for the DFLP. The DFLP thus lost its influence over the Palestinian independence movement, while Islamist groups such as Hamas and the Palestinian Islamic Jihad rose to prominence. In 1999, the DFLP reconciled with Fatah and considered recognising the State of Israel in the event of a peace treaty, which convinced the United States Department of State to drop the DFLP from its list of designated terrorist groups.

=== Second Intifada and renewed attacks (2000–2005) ===
After a period of relative inactivity during the 1990s, the DFLP renewed armed attacks against the IDF during the Second Intifada. They carried out a number of shooting attacks against Israeli targets, such as the 25 August 2001 attack on a military base in Gaza that killed three Israeli soldiers and wounded seven others.

On 11 September 2001, an anonymous caller claimed responsibility for the September 11 attacks in the United States on behalf of the DFLP; but the DFLP itself denied the accusations and formally condemned the attacks. On 25 August 2007, Palestinian militants from the Popular Resistance Committees (PRC) and DFLP attempted to enter the Israeli border town of Netiv HaAsara from Gaza. The militants used a ladder to scale the Israel-Gaza border and were killed by the Israel Defense Forces.

=== Gaza war ===
The DFLP's armed wing, the National Resistance Brigades, confirmed their participation in the October 7 attacks through their military spokesman Abu Khaled. On 7 October, during the attack on Israel, they claimed to have lost three fighters in combat with the IDF, and said on 8 October that they were engaged with Israeli forces in Kfar Aza, Be'eri, and Kissufim.

The DFLP has since fought the IDF alongside Hamas and other allied Palestinian factions in subsequent battles throughout the Gaza Strip.

On 19 October 2025, the BBC reported about Mahmoud Amin Ya'qub al-Muhtadi, who was a member of the DFLP's armed wing, the NRB, was arrested in Louisiana, where he was a resident for the last year. He was charged with providing, attempting to provide or conspiring to provide material support to a foreign terrorist organization, and the fraud and misuse of a visa or other documents. According to the report, a few hours after an attack started on October 7, his phone connected to a cell tower near Kibbutz Kfar Aza, where a massacre took place, the documents said.

== Political influence ==
The DFLP ran a candidate, Taysir Khalid, in the Palestinian Authority presidential election in 2005. He gained 3.35% of the vote. It did not win any seats in the 2005 PA municipal elections.

In the 2006 elections to the Palestinian Legislative Council, the Front formed a joint list called al-Badeel (The Alternative) with Palestine Democratic Union (FIDA), the Palestinian People's Party and independents. The list was led by the historic DFLP leader Qais Abd al-Karim (Abu Leila). It received 2.8% of the popular vote and won two of the council's 132 seats.

The DFLP retains important influence within the Palestine Liberation Organization (PLO). It was traditionally the third-largest group within the PLO, after Fatah and the PFLP, and since no new elections have been held to the PNC or the Executive Committee since 1988, the DFLP still commands important sectors within the organization. The PLO's role has diminished in later years, in favor of the Palestinian National Authority (PNA), but it is still the recognized representative of the Palestinian people, and a reactivation of the PLO's constitutional supremacy over the PNA in connection with power struggles in Palestinian society is a distinct possibility.

In February 2023, the DFLP launched a party in Lebanon for the Palestinian refugees still living there, together with the Lebanese Communist Party.

== External relations ==
The DFLP is believed to have received limited financial and military aid from Syria, where it is active in the Palestinian refugee camps. The DFLP's leader, Nayif Hawatmeh, lives in Syria. It provided military training for Marxist–Leninist militants of the Kurdistan Workers' Party (PKK) in 1980 and the Sandinistas.

The DFLP is not listed as a terrorist organization by the United States government or the United Nations. It was dropped from the U.S. State Department list of Foreign Terrorist Organizations in 1999, "primarily because of the absence of terrorist activity, as defined by relevant law...during the past two years."

== See also ==
- Palestinian Communist Party
- Popular Front for the Liberation of Palestine
- Revolutionary People's Liberation Party/Front
- Syrian Resistance
- List of political parties in the State of Palestine

== Bibliography ==
- Alexander, Yonah (2003). "Democratic Front for the Liberation of Palestine". Palestinian Secular Terrorism. Brill. pp. 45–48. doi:10.1163/9789004479500_006. ISBN 1-57105-307-7. LCCN 2003048409.
- Gresh, Alain (2005) [2000]. "Democratic Front for the Liberation of Palestine". In Mattar, Philip (ed.). Encyclopedia of the Palestinians. Facts on File. pp. 118–119. ISBN 0-8160-5764-8. LCCN 2004057673.
- Hasso, Frances S. (2005). Resistance, Repression, and Gender Politics in Occupied Palestine and Jordan. Syracuse University Press. ISBN 0-8156-3087-5. LCCN 2005018502.
- Muslih, Muhammad Y. (1976). "Moderates and Rejectionists within the Palestine Liberation Organization". Middle East Journal. 30 (2): 127–140. ISSN 0026-3141. JSTOR 4325481.
