= Palestinians =

Arab national group of the Levant

الفلسطينيون (Arabic) al-Filasṭīniyyūn
- Flag of Palestine

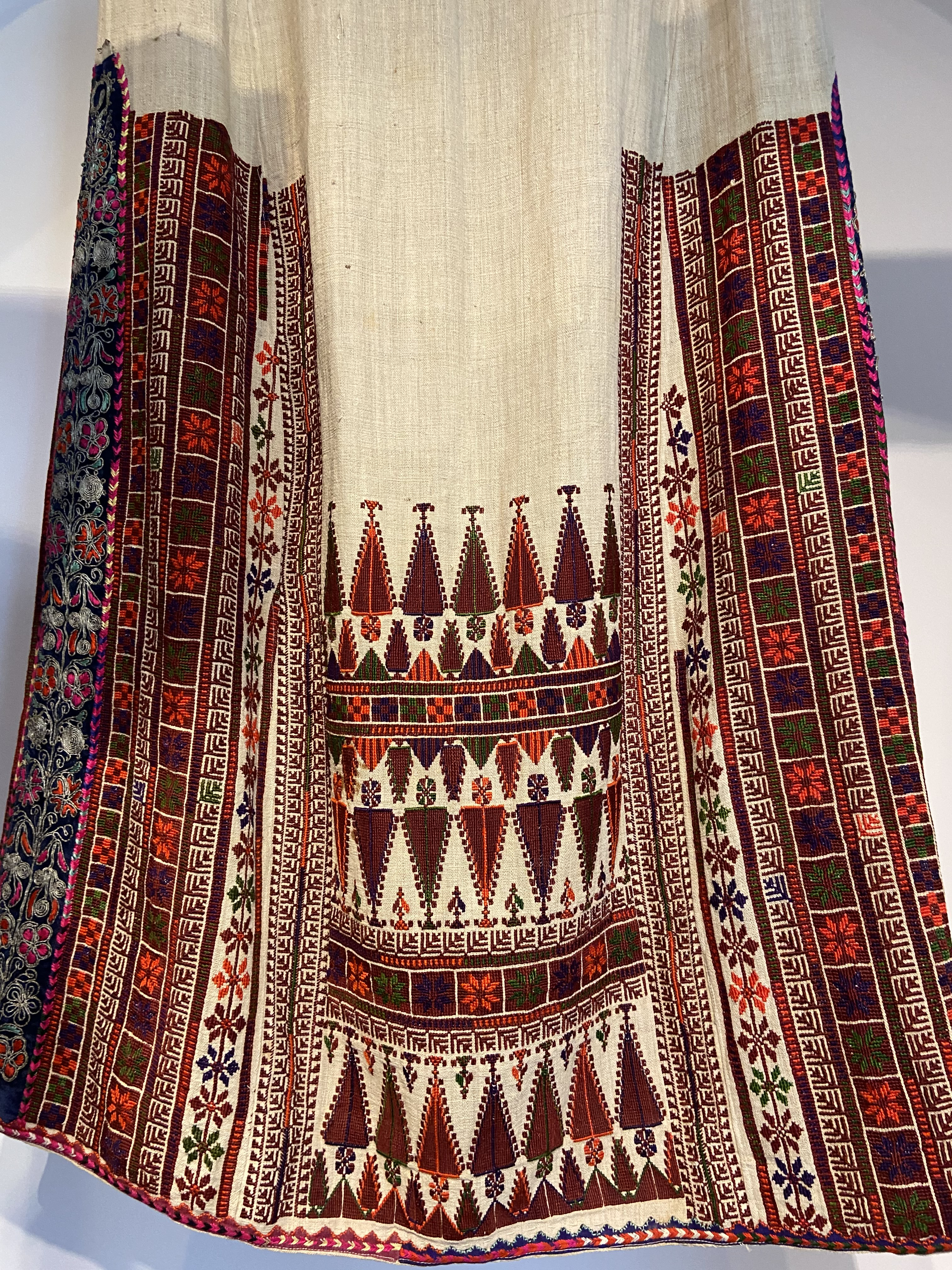
- Embroidered panel on a 1920s dress from Bayt Dajan, Jaffa area

Total population
- 14.3 million

Regions with significant populations
- Palestine
- 5,350,000
  - West Bank (Palestine): 3,190,000 (of whom 912,879 are registered refugees as of 2024)
  - Gaza Strip (Palestine): 2,170,000 (of whom 1,476,706 are registered refugees as of 2024)
- Jordan: 2,307,011 (2024, registered refugees only)–3,240,000 (2009)
- Israel: 2,037,000 (2022)
- Syria: 568,530 (2021, registered refugees only)
- Chile: 500,000
- Saudi Arabia: 426,000
- Qatar: 356,000
- United States: 255,000
- Germany: 200,000
- United Arab Emirates: 200,000
- Lebanon: 174,000 (2017 census)–458,369 (2016, registered refugees)
- Egypt: 135,932
- Kuwait: 80,000
- Honduras: 27,000–200,000
- Libya: 72,000
- El Salvador: 70,000
- Iraq: 57,000
- Brazil: 50,000
- Canada: 45,905
- Yemen: 37,000
- Turkey: 23,569
- United Kingdom: 20,000
- Peru: 15,000
- Mexico: 13,000
- Colombia: 13,000
- Netherlands: 9,000–15,000
- Australia: ~7,000 (Note: See: White Australia Policy and Arab Australians)
- Sweden: 7,000
- Algeria: 4,020

Languages
- Palestine and Israel: Arabic (Palestinian Arabic); Diaspora: Palestinian Arabic and languages of host countries

Religion
- Majority: Sunni Islam; Significant minority: Christianity (various denominations); Minority: Non-denominational Islam; Druze; Samaritanism; Shia Islam

Related ethnic groups
- Jordanians, Lebanese, and other Arabs

Palestinians (Arabic: الفلسطينيون, romanized: al-Filasṭīniyyūn) are an Arab national group native to the region of Palestine, descended from those who have inhabited the area over the millennia. They represent a highly homogenized community who share a cultural and ethnic identity, and close linguistic and cultural ties with other Levantine Arabs.

In 1919, Palestinian Muslims and Christians constituted 90 percent of the population of Palestine, just before the third wave of Jewish immigration and the establishment of British Mandatory Palestine after World War I. Opposition to Jewish immigration spurred the consolidation of a unified national identity, though Palestinian society was still fragmented by regional, class, religious, and family differences. The history of the Palestinian national identity is a disputed issue amongst scholars: For some, the term "Palestinian" refers to the nationalist concept of a Palestinian people by Palestinian Arabs from the late 19th century and in the pre–World War I period; others assert that the Palestinian identity encompasses the heritage of all eras from pre-biblical times up to the Ottoman period. After the Israeli Declaration of Independence and subsequent Palestinian expulsion in 1948, and more so after the 1967 Palestinian exodus, the term "Palestinian" evolved into a sense of a shared future in the form of aspirations for a Palestinian state. As Palestinian self-determination remains unresolved, namely by the absence of citizenship within a fully sovereign Palestinian state, Palestinians remain eligible for international protection as refugees and stateless persons under international law.

Founded in 1964, the Palestine Liberation Organization is an umbrella organization for groups that represent the Palestinian people before international states. The Palestinian National Authority, officially established in 1994 as a result of the Oslo Accords, is an interim administrative body nominally responsible for governance in Palestinian population centres in the West Bank and the Gaza Strip. Since 1978, the United Nations has observed an annual International Day of Solidarity with the Palestinian People.

Despite various wars and exoduses, roughly half the world's Palestinians continue to reside in the territory of former Mandatory Palestine, now encompassing Israel and the occupied Palestinian territories of the West Bank and Gaza Strip. In Israel proper, Palestinians constitute almost 21 percent of the population as part of its Arab citizens. Many are Palestinian refugees or internally displaced Palestinians, including over 1.4 million in the Gaza Strip, over 870,000 in the West Bank, and around 250,000 in Israel proper. Of the Palestinian population who live abroad, known as the Palestinian diaspora, more than half are stateless, lacking legal citizenship in any country. Of the diaspora population, 2.3 million are registered as refugees in neighboring Jordan, most of whom hold Jordanian citizenship; over 1 million live between Syria and Lebanon, and about 750,000 live in Saudi Arabia, with Chile holding the largest Palestinian diaspora (around half a million) outside the Arab world.

== Etymology ==
The Greek toponym Palaistínē (Παλαιστίνη), which is the origin of the Arabic Filasṭīn (فلسطين), first occurs in the work of the 5th century BCE Greek historian Herodotus, where it denotes generally the coastal land from Phoenicia down to Egypt. Herodotus also employs the term as an ethnonym, as when he speaks of the "Syrians of Palestine" or "Palestinian-Syrians", an ethnically amorphous group he distinguishes from the Phoenicians. Herodotus makes no distinction between the inhabitants of Palestine.

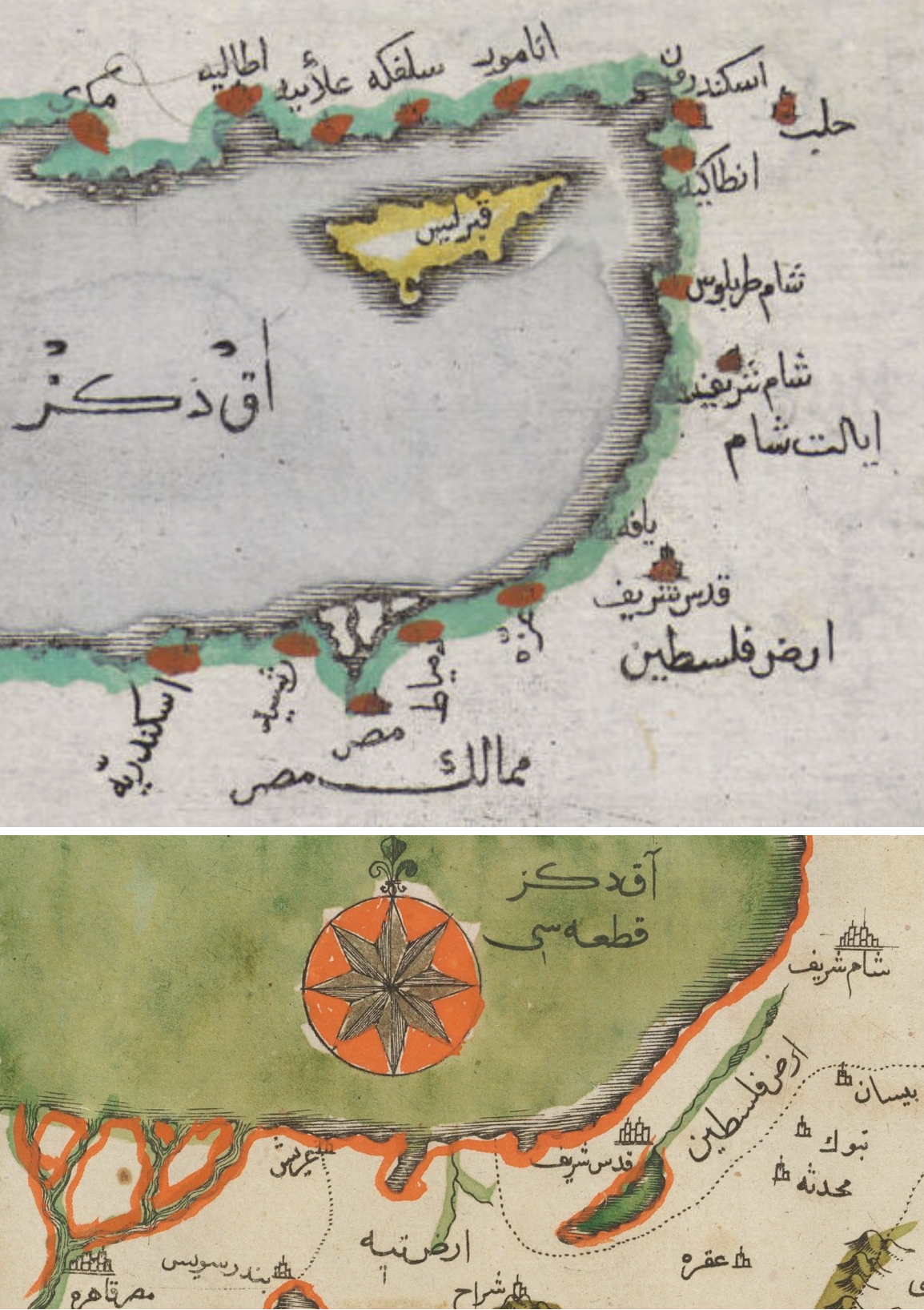
1650s maps of the region by Ottoman geographer Kâtip Çelebi, showing the term أرض فلسطين ("Land of Palestine")

The Greek word reflects an ancient Eastern Mediterranean-Near Eastern word which was used either as a toponym or ethnonym. In Ancient Egyptian Peleset/Purusati has been conjectured to refer to the "Sea Peoples", particularly the Philistines. Among Semitic languages, Akkadian Palaštu (variant Pilištu) is used of 7th-century Philistia and its, by then, four city states. Biblical Hebrew's cognate word Plištim, is usually translated Philistines.

When the Romans conquered the region in the first century BCE, they used the name Judaea for the province that covered most of the region. At the same time, the name Syria Palestina continued to be used by historians and geographers to refer to the area between the Mediterranean Sea and the Jordan River, as in the writings of Philo, Josephus and Pliny the Elder. During the early 2nd century CE, Syria Palaestina became the official administrative name in a move viewed by scholars as an attempt by emperor Hadrian to disassociate Jews from the land as punishment for the Bar Kokhba revolt. Jacobson suggested the change to be rationalized by the fact that the new province was far larger. The name was thenceforth inscribed on coins, and beginning in the fifth century, mentioned in rabbinic texts. The Arabic word Filastin has been used to refer to the region since the time of the earliest medieval Arab geographers. It appears to have been used as an Arabic adjectival noun in the region since as early as the 7th century (see for example Al-Maqdisi and Mujir al-Din).

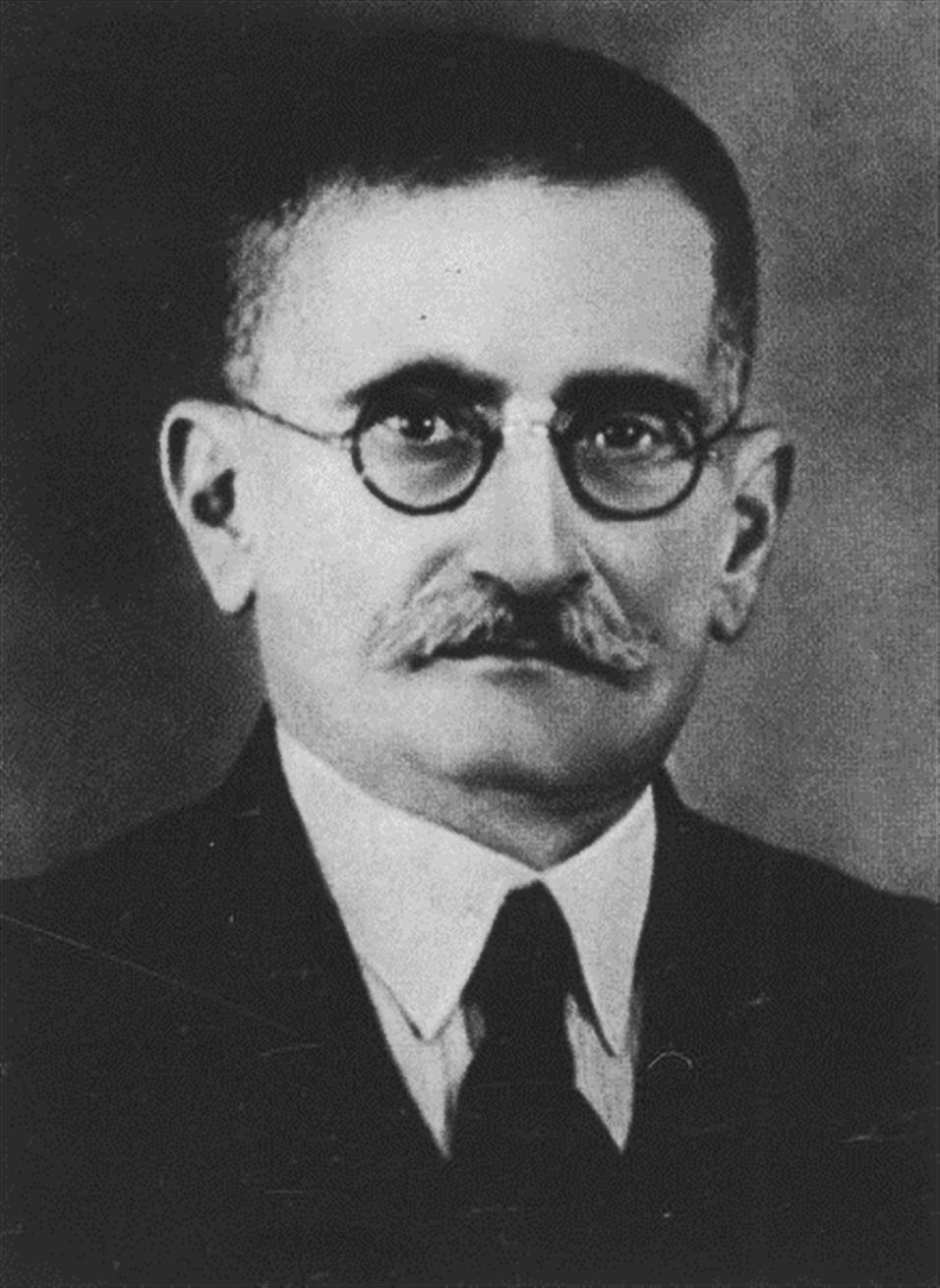
Khalil Beidas (1874–1949) whose writings played an important role in the development of Palestinian nationalist consciousness

In modern times, the first person to self-describe Palestine's Arabs as "Palestinians" was Khalil Beidas in 1898, followed by Salim Quba'in and Najib Nassar in 1902. After the 1908 Young Turk Revolution, which eased press censorship laws in the Ottoman Empire, dozens of newspapers and periodicals were founded in Palestine, and the term "Palestinian" expanded in usage. Among those were the Al-Quds, Al-Munadi, Falastin, Al-Karmil and Al-Nafir newspapers, which used the term "Filastini" more than 170 times in 110 articles from 1908 to 1914. They also made references to a "Palestinian society", "Palestinian nation", and a "Palestinian diaspora". Article writers included Christian and Muslim Arab Palestinians, Palestinian emigrants, and non-Palestinian Arabs. The Palestinian Arab Christian newspaper Falastin had addressed its readers as Palestinians since its inception in 1911 during the Ottoman period.

During the Mandatory Palestine period, the term "Palestinian" was used to refer to all people residing there, regardless of religion or ethnicity, and those granted citizenship by the British Mandatory authorities were granted "Palestinian citizenship". Other examples include the use of the term Palestine Regiment to refer to the Jewish Infantry Brigade Group of the British Army during World War II, and the term "Palestinian Talmud", which is an alternative name of the Jerusalem Talmud, used mainly in academic sources.

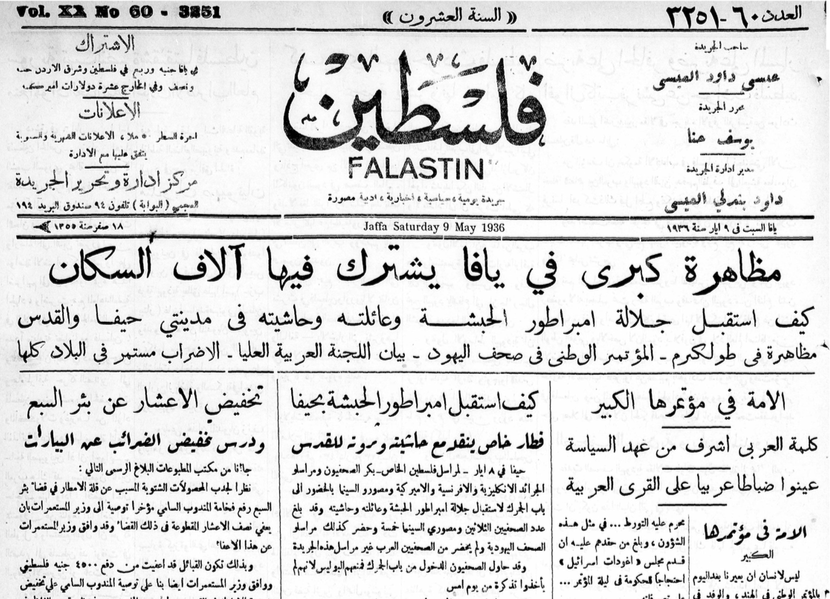
1936 issue of the Palestinian Arab Christian Falastin newspaper addressed its readers as "Palestinians" since its establishment in 1911.

Following the 1948 establishment of Israel, the use and application of the terms "Palestine" and "Palestinian" by and to Palestinian Jews largely dropped from use. For example, the English-language newspaper The Palestine Post, founded by Jews in 1932, changed its name in 1950 to The Jerusalem Post. The term Arab Jews can include Jews with Palestinian heritage and Israeli citizenship, although some Arab Jews prefer to be called Mizrahi Jews. Non-Jewish Arab citizens of Israel with Palestinian heritage identify themselves as Arabs or Palestinians. These non-Jewish Arab Israelis thus include those that are Palestinian by heritage but Israeli by citizenship.

The Palestinian National Charter, as amended by the PLO's Palestinian National Council in July 1968, defined "Palestinians" as "those Arab nationals who, until 1947, normally resided in Palestine regardless of whether they were evicted from it or stayed there. Anyone born, after that date, of a Palestinian father – whether in Palestine or outside it – is also a Palestinian." Note that "Arab nationals" is not religious-specific, and it includes not only the Arabic-speaking Muslims of Palestine but also the Arab Christians and other religious communities of Palestine who were at that time Arabic-speakers, such as the Samaritans and Druze. Thus, the Jews of Palestine were/are also included, although limited only to "the [Arabic-speaking] Jews who had normally resided in Palestine until the beginning of the [pre-state] Zionist invasion." The Charter also states that "Palestine with the boundaries it had during the British Mandate, is an indivisible territorial unit."

== Origins ==
Historic records and genetic studies suggest that the Palestinian people are descendants of ancient Levantine populations. Palestinians are sometimes described as indigenous. According to International Work Group for Indigenous Affairs, the "Indigenous Peoples of Palestine are the Bedouin Jahalin, al-Kaabneh, al-Azazmeh, al-Ramadin and al-Rshaida".

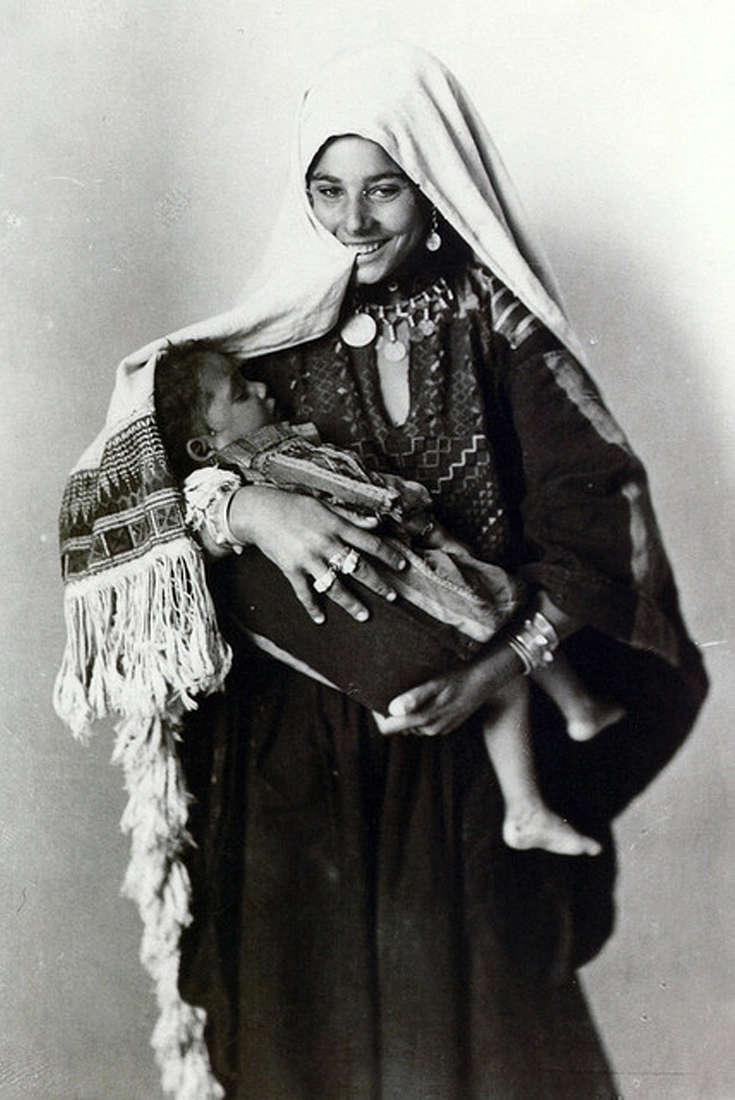
Palestinian mother and child, circa 1920

Palestine has undergone many demographic and religious upheavals throughout history. During the 2nd millennium BCE, it was inhabited by the Canaanites, Semitic-speaking peoples who practiced the Canaanite religion. Most Palestinians share a strong genetic link to the ancient Canaanites. Israelites later emerged as an outgrowth of southern Canaanite civilization, with Jews and Israelite Samaritans eventually forming the majority of the population in Palestine during classical antiquity, However, the Jewish population in Jerusalem and its surroundings in Judea, and Samaritan population in Samaria, never fully recovered as a result of the Jewish-Roman Wars and Samaritan revolts respectively.

In the centuries that followed, the region experienced political and economic unrest and the religious persecution of minorities. Mass conversions to Christianity (and the subsequent Christianization of the Roman Empire), along with the emigration of pagans, Jews, and Samaritans, contributed to a Christian majority forming in Late Roman and Byzantine Palestine.

In the 7th century, the Arab Rashiduns conquered the Levant; they were later succeeded by other Arab Muslim dynasties, including the Umayyads, Abbasids and the Fatimids. Over the following several centuries, the population of Palestine drastically decreased, from an estimated 1 million during the Roman and Byzantine periods to about 300,000 by the early Ottoman period. Over time, the existing population adopted Arab culture and language and much converted to Islam. The settlement of Arabs before and after the Muslim conquest is thought to have played a role in accelerating the Islamization process. Some scholars suggest that by the arrival of the Crusaders, Palestine was already overwhelmingly Muslim, while others claim that it was only after the Crusades that the Christians lost their majority, and that the process of mass Islamization took place much later, perhaps during the Mamluk period. According to Palestinian historian Nazmi Al-Ju'beh, as with in other Arab nations, the Arab identity of Palestinians is largely based on linguistic and cultural affiliation, and is independent of the existence of any actual Arabian origins.

For several centuries during the Ottoman period the population in Palestine declined and fluctuated between 150,000 and 250,000 inhabitants, and it was only in the 19th century that a rapid population growth began to occur. This growth was aided by the immigration of Egyptians (during the reigns of Muhammad Ali and Ibrahim Pasha) and Algerians (following the French conquest of Algeria) in the first half of the 19th century, and the subsequent immigration of Algerians, Bosniaks, and Circassians during the second half of the century. Between 1871 and 1945, around a dozen villages were established by immigrants.

Many Palestinian villagers claim ancestral ties to Arab tribes from the Arabian Peninsula that settled in Palestine during or after the Muslim conquest of the Levant. Some Palestinian families, notably in the Hebron and Nablus regions, claim Jewish and Samaritan ancestry respectively, preserving associated cultural customs and traditions.

== Genetics ==
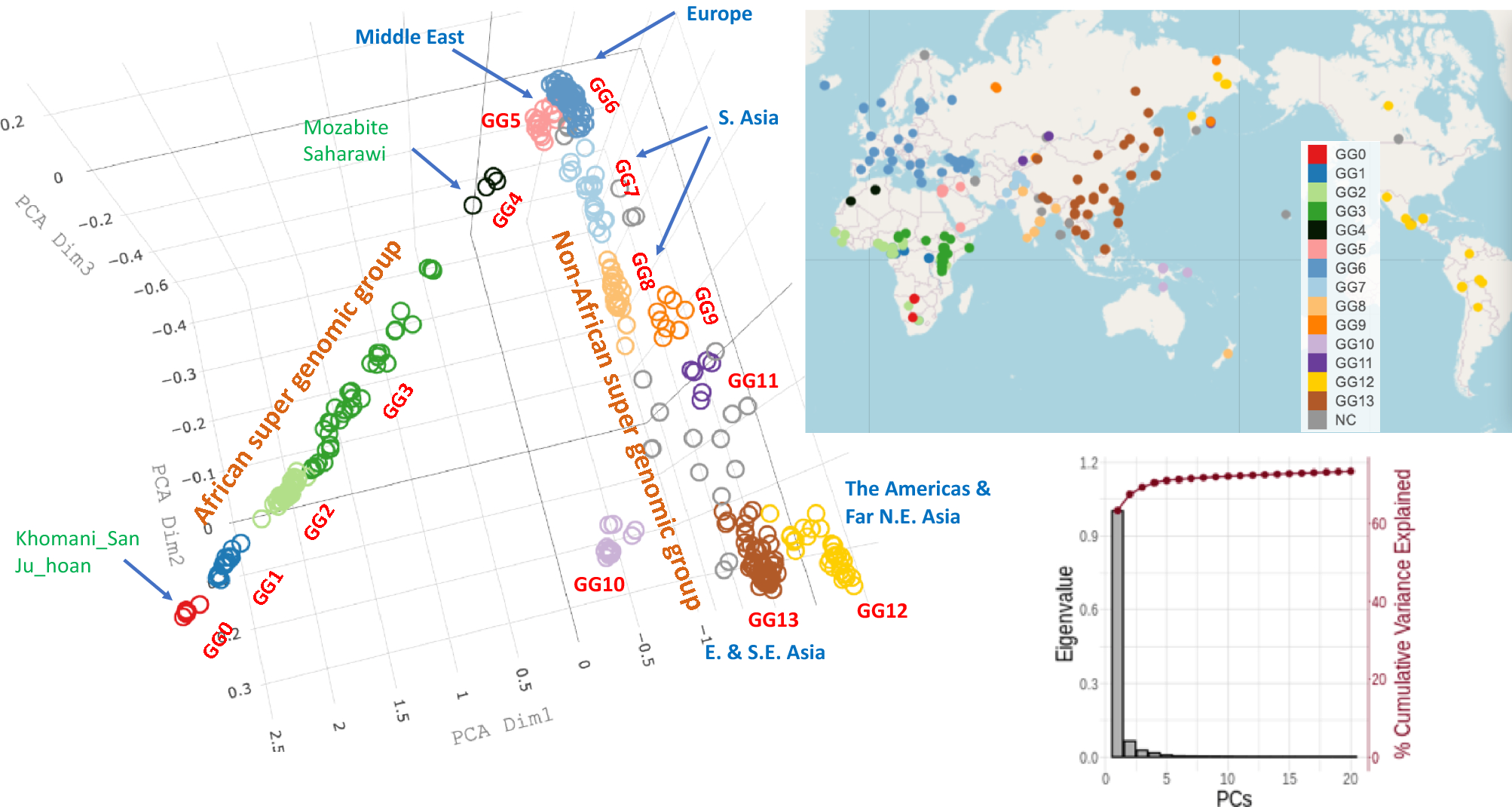
In a whole-genome study of modern-day ethnic groups in the world, Palestinian samples clustered in the "Middle Eastern genomic group" (shown as "GG5" in left image), which included samples from populations such as Samaritans, Bedouins, Jordanians, Iraqi Jews and Yemenite Jews. Left image shows clustering following principal component analysis with three dimensions. Top right image shows geographical locations where samples were collected.

Genetic studies indicate that the Palestinian people descend mostly from ancient Levantines extending back to Bronze Age inhabitants of the Levant. They also note a genetic relationship between Palestinians and other Arab and Semitic groups in the Middle East and North Africa as well as a genetic relationship between Palestinians and various Jewish groups.

Levantine origins

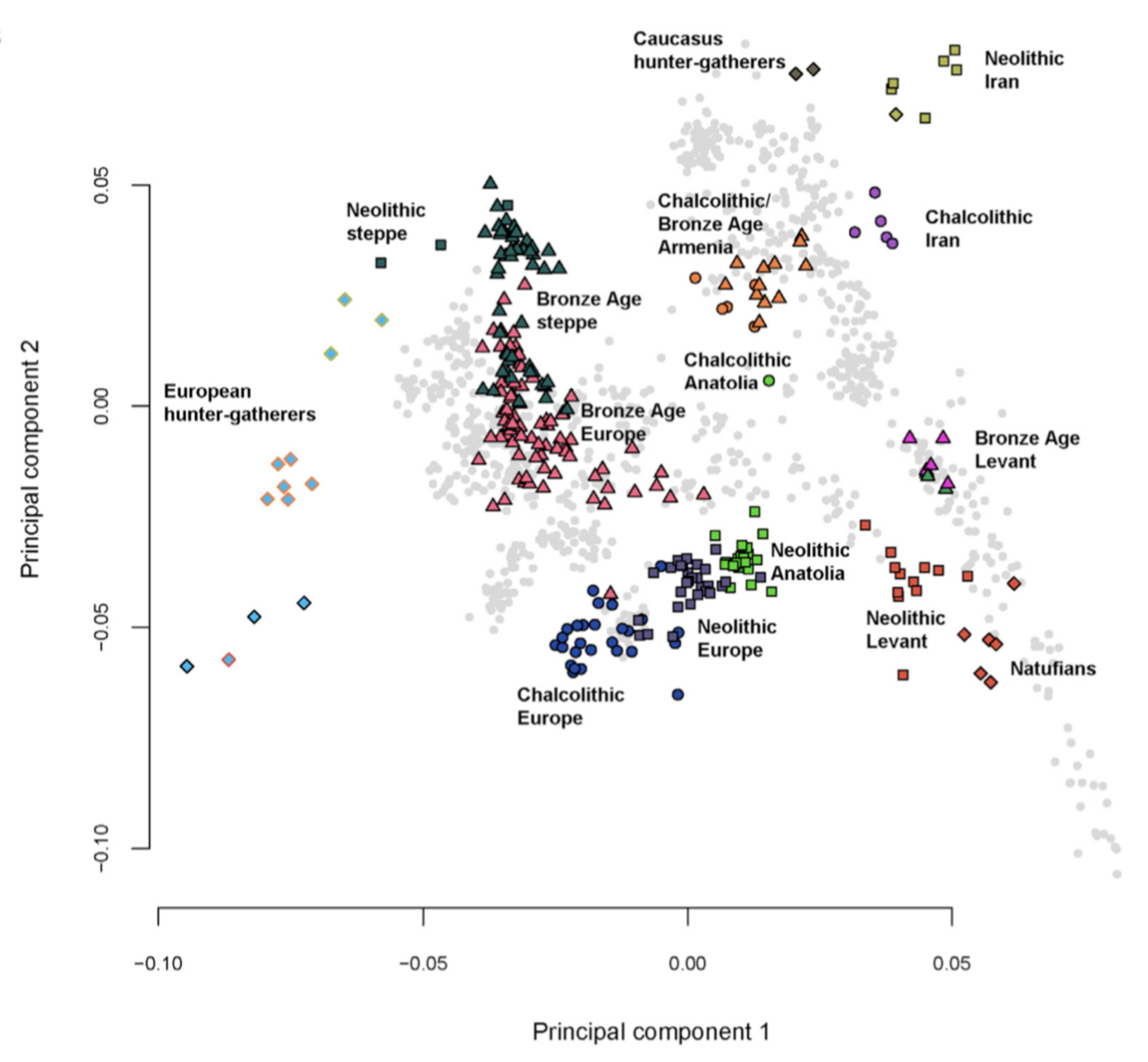
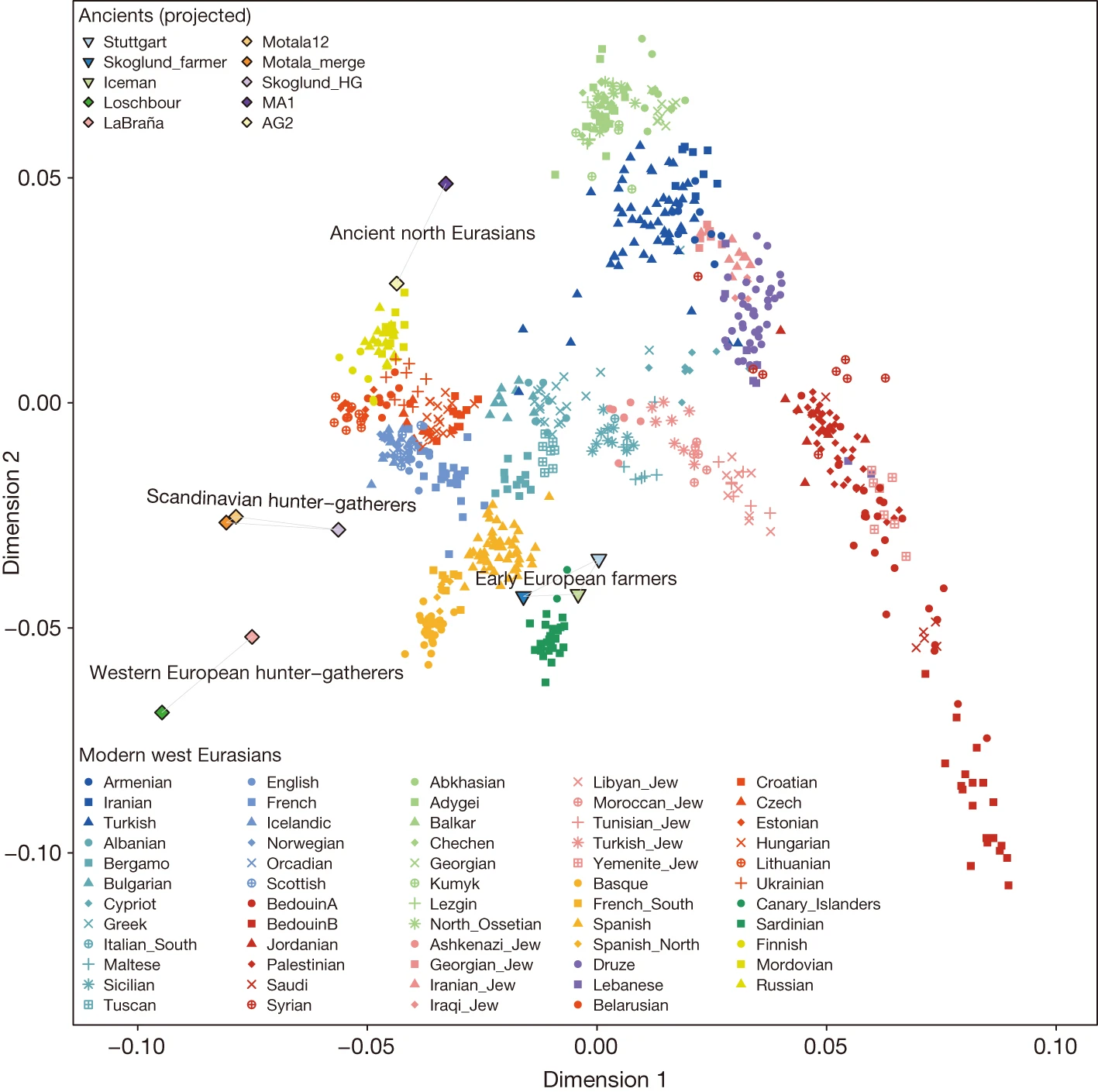
Principal component analysis. Top image Non-gray colors show ancient samples above gray-colored modern populations, whereas bottom image shows the labeled modern-day populations beneath. Palestinians cluster with Bronze Age Levantine samples, The authors of the study concluded that the "overlap between the Bronze Age and present-day Levantines suggests a degree of genetic continuity in the region." (Haber et al., 2017)

A 2015 study by Verónica Fernandes and others concluded that Palestinians have a "primarily indigenous origin".

In a 2016 study by Scarlett Marshall and others published in Nature, the study concluded that the biogeographical affinities of "both Syrians and Palestinians are highly localised to the Levant", the authors also noted that the biogeographical affinity of Palestinians goes in agreement with historical records and previous studies on their uniparental markers, which all suggest that Palestinians at least in part descend from local Israelite converts to Islam after the Islamic expansion.

According to a study published in June 2017 by Ranajit Das, Paul Wexler, Mehdi Pirooznia, and Eran Elhaik in Frontiers in Genetics, in a principal component analysis, Natufians, together with a Neolithic Levantine sample, "clustered predominantly with modern-day Palestinians" and that Palestinians have a "predominant" ancient Levantine origin and residual Iranian origin, with some Eastern Hunter-Gatherer and smaller amounts of Anatolian admixture.

In a study published in August 2017 by Marc Haber et al. in The American Journal of Human Genetics, the authors concluded that: "The overlap between the Bronze Age and present-day Levantines suggests a degree of genetic continuity in the region". later in 2024 Haber also commented that all modern Levantine Arabs descend from Canaanite-like ancestors, and later migrations' impact on their population ancestry was slight.

A 2020 study on human remains from Middle Bronze Age Southern Levantine(2100–1550 BC) populations suggests a significant degree of genetic continuity in Arabic-speaking Levantine populations, as well as several Jewish groups. Palestinians, among other Levantine groups, were found to derive 81–87% of their ancestry from Bronze age Levantines, relating to Canaanites as well as Kura–Araxes culture impact from before 2400 BCE (4400 years before present); 8–12% from an East African source and 5–10% from Bronze age Europeans. Results show that a significant European component was added to the region since the Bronze Age (on average ~8.7%), seemingly related to the Sea Peoples, excluding Ashkenazi and Moroccan Jews who were found to have greater European ancestry, both populations having a history in Europe, as well as around 50% Bronze Age Levantine ancestry.

A 2021 study by the New York Genome Center found that the predominant component of the DNA of modern Palestinians matches that of Bronze Age Canaanites who lived around 2500–1700 BCE.

A 2023 study, which looked at the whole genomes of modern-day ethnic groups around the world, found that the Palestinian samples clustered in the "Middle Eastern genomic group". This group included samples from populations such as Samaritans, Bedouins, Jordanians, Iraqi Jews and Yemenite Jews.

Haplogroups

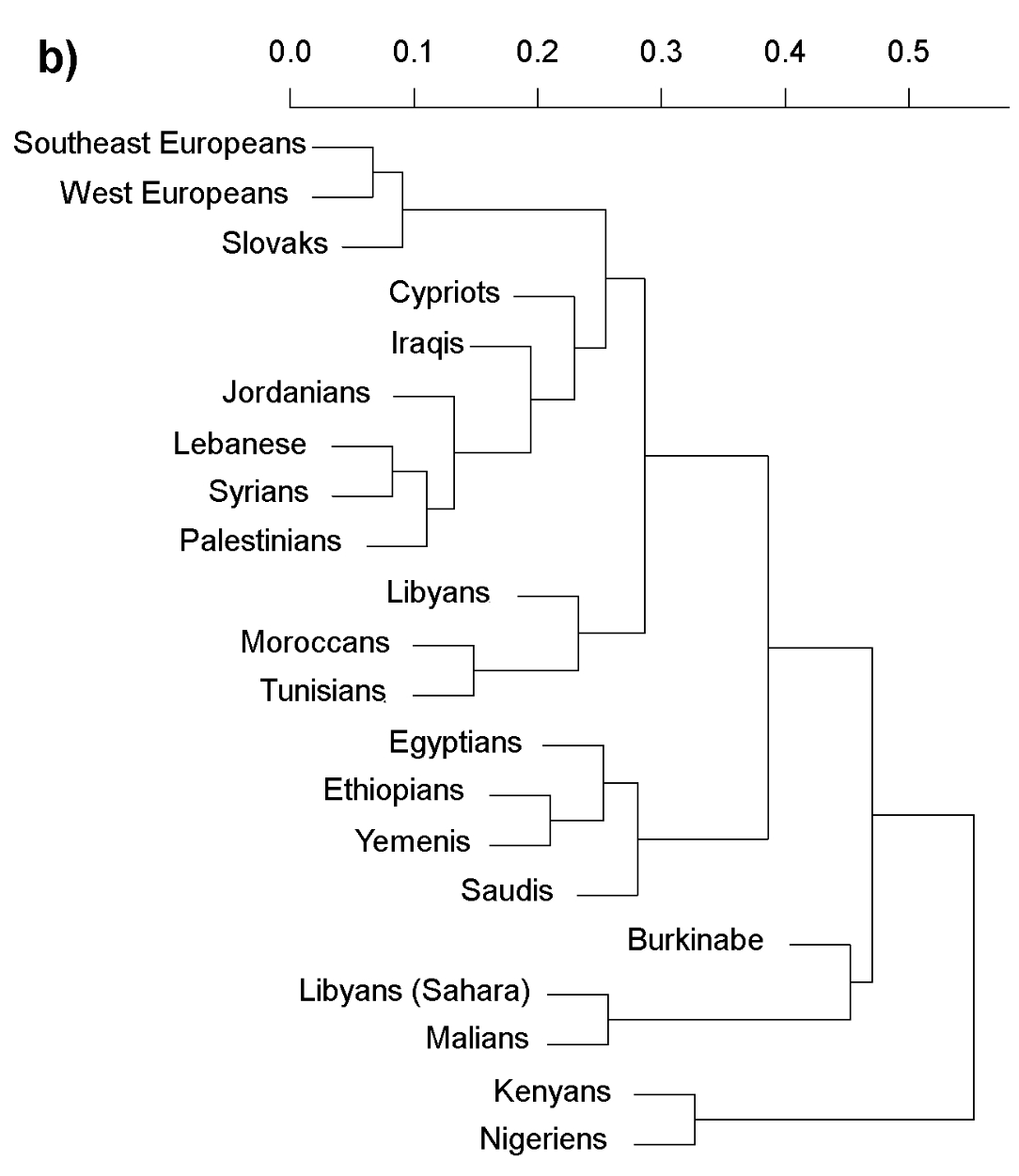
Dendrogram based on mtDNA haplogroup frequencies from Badro et al. 2013.

A 2013 study by Badro et al. analyzed haplogroups of modern Palestinians as well as other groups from the Middle East. The study found that mtDNA distribution of Palestinians, Lebanese, Jordanians, and Syrians clustered together separate from Yemenis, Saudis, and Egyptians, and that the Arabian peninsula population clusters were differentiated from Levantine populations.

In a genetic study of Y-chromosomal STRs in two populations from Israel and the Palestinian Territories, the Y-haplogroup frequency of Palestinian Christians was E1b1b(31.82%), followed by G2a (11.36%), and J-M267 (9.09%), and that of Palestinian Muslims was J-M267 (37.82%) followed by E1b1b (19.33%), and T(5.88%). The study sample consisted of 44 Palestinian Christians and 119 Palestinian Muslims.

A study found that the Palestinians, like Jordanians, Lebanese, and Syrians, have what appears to be female-mediated gene flow in the form of maternal DNA haplogroups from Sub-Saharan Africa. 15 percent of the 117 Palestinian individuals tested carried such maternal haplogroups, consistent with female migration from eastern Africa into Near Eastern communities within the last few thousand years. It is likely this ancestry traces back to women brought from Africa as part of the Arab slave trade.

== Identity ==
=== Emergence of a distinct identity ===
The timing and causes behind the emergence of a distinctively Palestinian national identity among the Arabs of Palestine are matters of scholarly disagreement. Some argue that it can be traced as far back as the peasants' revolt in Palestine in 1834 (or even as early as the 17th century), while others argue that it did not emerge until after the Mandatory Palestine period. Legal historian Assaf Likhovski states that the prevailing view is that Palestinian identity originated in the early decades of the 20th century, when an embryonic desire among Palestinians for self-government in the face of generalized fears that Zionism would lead to a Jewish state and the dispossession of the Arab majority crystallised among most editors, Christian and Muslim, of local newspapers. The term itself Filasṭīnī was first introduced by Khalīl Beidas in a translation of a Russian work on the Holy Land into Arabic in 1898. After that, its usage gradually spread so that, by 1908, with the loosening of censorship controls under late Ottoman rule, a number of Muslim, Christian and Jewish correspondents writing for newspapers began to use the term with great frequency in referring to the 'Palestinian people' (ahl/ahālī Filasṭīn), 'Palestinians' (al-Filasṭīnīyūn), the 'sons of Palestine' (abnā' Filasṭīn) or to 'Palestinian society' (al-mujtama' al-filasṭīnī).

Eagle of Saladin, the coat of arms and emblem of the Palestinian Authority

Whatever the differing viewpoints over the timing, causal mechanisms, and orientation of Palestinian nationalism, by the early 20th century strong opposition to Zionism and evidence of a burgeoning nationalistic Palestinian identity is found in the content of Arabic-language newspapers in Palestine, such as Al-Karmil (est. 1908) and Filasteen (est. 1911). Filasteen initially focused its critique of Zionism around the failure of the Ottoman administration to control Jewish immigration and the large influx of foreigners, later exploring the impact of Zionist land-purchases on Palestinian peasants (Arabic: فلاحين, fellahin), expressing growing concern over land dispossession and its implications for the society at large.

Historian Rashid Khalidi's 1997 book Palestinian Identity: The Construction of Modern National Consciousness is considered a "foundational text" on the subject. He notes that the archaeological strata that denote the history of Palestine – encompassing the Biblical, Roman, Byzantine, Umayyad, Abbasid, Fatimid, Crusader, Ayyubid, Mamluk and Ottoman periods – form part of the identity of the modern-day Palestinian people, as they have come to understand it over the last century. Noting that Palestinian identity has never been an exclusive one, with "Arabism, religion, and local loyalties" playing an important role, Khalidi cautions against the efforts of some extreme advocates of Palestinian nationalism to "anachronistically" read back into history a nationalist consciousness that is in fact "relatively modern".

Khalidi argues that the modern national identity of Palestinians has its roots in nationalist discourses that emerged among the peoples of the Ottoman empire in the late 19th century that sharpened following the demarcation of modern nation-state boundaries in the Middle East after World War I. Khalidi also states that although the challenge posed by Zionism played a role in shaping this identity, that "it is a serious mistake to suggest that Palestinian identity emerged mainly as a response to Zionism."

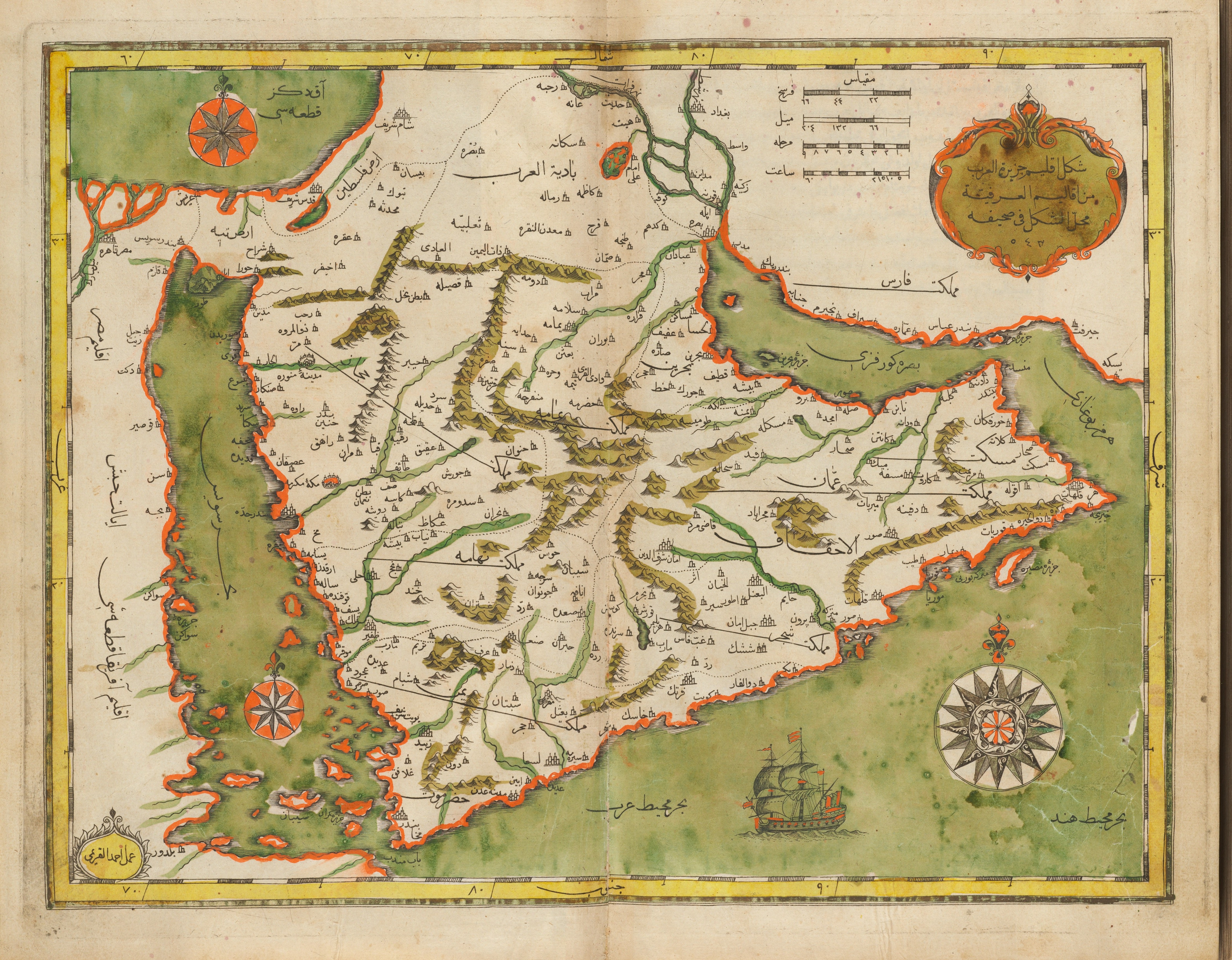
1732 copy of the map by Ottoman geographer Kâtip Çelebi (1609–57) from the first printed atlas in the Ottoman Empire, and represented the first detailed mapping of the Asian provinces of the empire. with the term ارض فلسطين ("Land of Palestine") extending vertically down the length of the Jordan River

Conversely, historian James L. Gelvin argues that Palestinian nationalism was a direct reaction to Zionism. In his book The Israel-Palestine Conflict: One Hundred Years of War he states that "Palestinian nationalism emerged during the interwar period in response to Zionist immigration and settlement." Gelvin argues that this fact does not make the Palestinian identity any less legitimate: "The fact that Palestinian nationalism developed later than Zionism and indeed in response to it does not in any way diminish the legitimacy of Palestinian nationalism or make it less valid than Zionism. All nationalisms arise in opposition to some 'other.' Why else would there be the need to specify who you are? And all nationalisms are defined by what they oppose."

David Seddon writes that "[t]he creation of Palestinian identity in its contemporary sense was formed essentially during the 1960s, with the creation of the Palestine Liberation Organization." He adds, however, that "the existence of a population with a recognizably similar name ('the Philistines') in Biblical times suggests a degree of continuity over a long historical period (much as 'the Israelites' of the Bible suggest a long historical continuity in the same region)."

Baruch Kimmerling and Joel S. Migdal consider the 1834 Peasants' revolt in Palestine as constituting the first formative event of the Palestinian people. From 1516 to 1917, Palestine was ruled by the Ottoman Empire save a decade from the 1830s to the 1840s when an Egyptian vassal of the Ottomans, Muhammad Ali, and his son Ibrahim Pasha successfully broke away from Ottoman leadership and, conquering territory spreading from Egypt to as far north as Damascus, asserted their own rule over the area. The so-called Peasants' Revolt by Palestine's Arabs was precipitated by heavy demands for conscripts. The local leaders and urban notables were unhappy about the loss of traditional privileges, while the peasants were well aware that conscription was little more than a death sentence. Starting in May 1834 the rebels took many cities, among them Jerusalem, Hebron and Nablus and Ibrahim Pasha's army was deployed, defeating the last rebels on 4 August in Hebron. Benny Morris argues that the Arabs in Palestine nevertheless remained part of a larger national pan-Arab or, alternatively, pan-Islamist movement. Walid Khalidi argues otherwise, writing that Palestinians in Ottoman times were "[a]cutely aware of the distinctiveness of Palestinian history ..." and "[a]lthough proud of their Arab heritage and ancestry, the Palestinians considered themselves to be descended not only from Arab conquerors of the seventh century but also from indigenous peoples who had lived in the country since time immemorial, including the ancient Hebrews and the Canaanites before them."

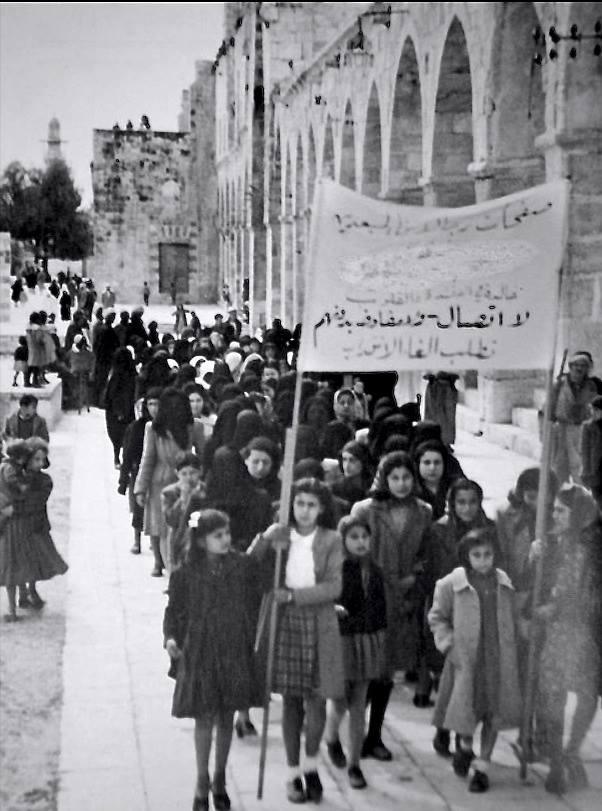
A 1930 Palestinian women's protest in Jerusalem against the British Mandate. The sign reads "No dialogue, no negotiations until termination [of the Mandate]"

Bernard Lewis argues it was not as a Palestinian nation that the Arabs of Ottoman Palestine objected to Zionists, since the very concept of such a nation was unknown to the Arabs of the area at the time and did not come into being until very much later. Even the concept of Arab nationalism in the Arab provinces of the Ottoman Empire, "had not reached significant proportions before the outbreak of World War I." Tamir Sorek, a sociologist, submits that, "Although a distinct Palestinian identity can be traced back at least to the middle of the nineteenth century (Kimmerling and Migdal 1993; Khalidi 1997b), or even to the seventeenth century (Gerber 1998), it was not until after World War I that a broad range of optional political affiliations became relevant for the Arabs of Palestine."

Israeli historian Efraim Karsh takes the view that the Palestinian identity did not develop until after the 1967 war because the Palestinian exodus/expulsion had fractured society so greatly that it was impossible to piece together a national identity. Between 1948 and 1967, the Jordanians and other Arab countries hosting Arab refugees from Palestine/Israel silenced any expression of Palestinian identity and occupied their lands until Israel's conquests of 1967. The formal annexation of the West Bank by Jordan in 1950, and the subsequent granting of its Palestinian residents Jordanian citizenship, further stunted the growth of a Palestinian national identity by integrating them into Jordanian society.

The idea of a unique Palestinian state distinct from its Arab neighbors was at first rejected by Palestinian representatives. The First Congress of Muslim-Christian Associations (in Jerusalem, February 1919), which met for the purpose of selecting a Palestinian Arab representative for the Paris Peace Conference, adopted the following resolution: "We consider Palestine as part of Arab Syria, as it has never been separated from it at any time. We are connected with it by national, religious, linguistic, natural, economic and geographical bonds."

== Rise of Palestinian nationalism ==
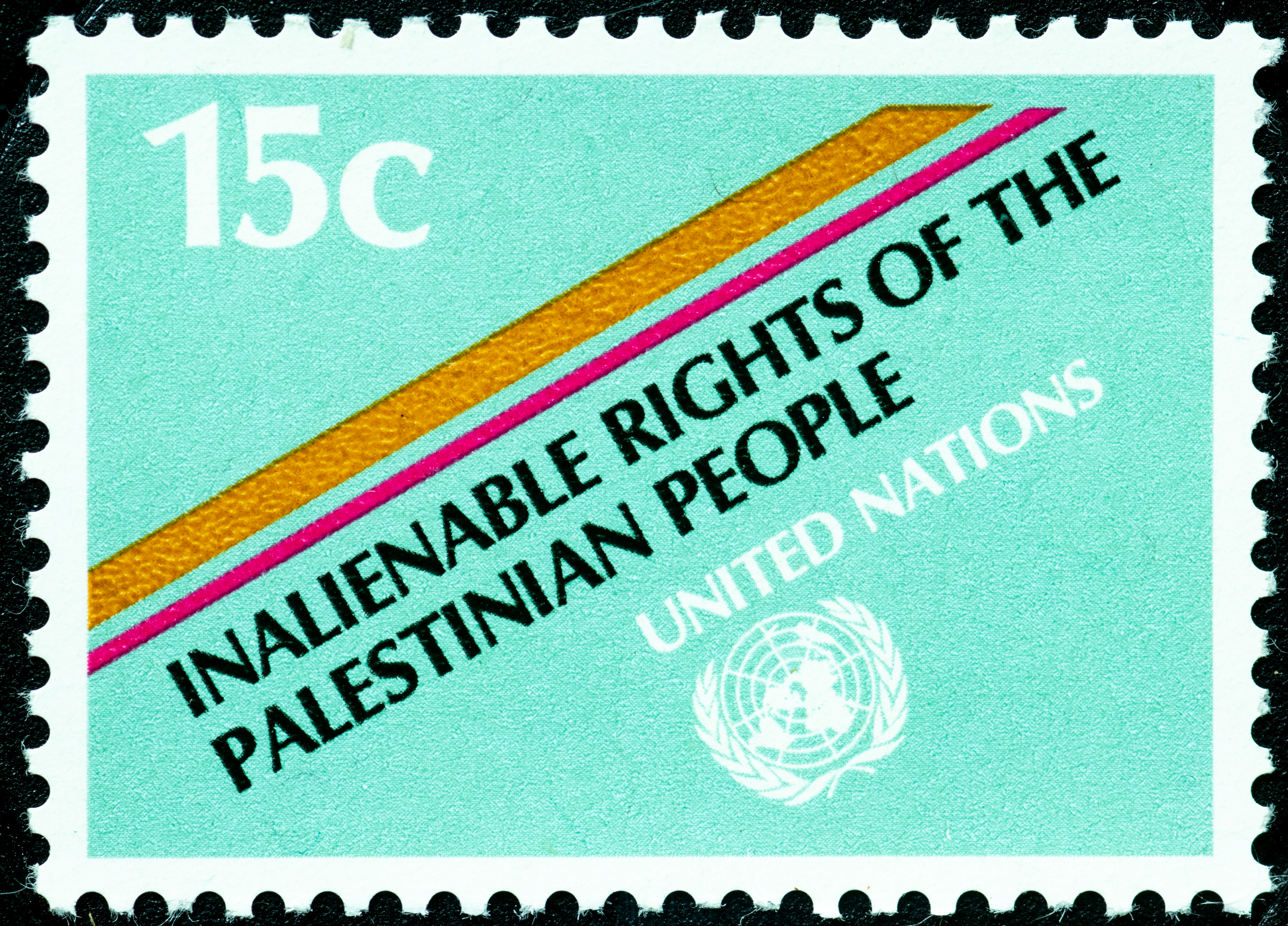
1981 UN stamp to commemorate the Palestinian struggle

An independent Palestinian state has not exercised full sovereignty over the land in which the Palestinians have lived during the modern era. Palestine was administered by the Ottoman Empire until World War I, and then overseen by the British Mandatory authorities. Israel was established in parts of Palestine in 1948, and in the wake of the 1948 Arab–Israeli War, the West Bank was ruled by Jordan, and the Gaza Strip by Egypt, with both countries continuing to administer these areas until Israel occupied them in the Six-Day War. Historian Avi Shlaim states that the Palestinians' lack of sovereignty over the land has been used by Israelis to deny Palestinians their rights to self-determination.

Today, the right of the Palestinian people to self-determination has been affirmed by the United Nations General Assembly, the International Court of Justice and several Israeli authorities. A total of 158 states recognize Palestine as a state. However, Palestinian sovereignty over the areas claimed as part of the Palestinian state remains limited, and the boundaries of the state remain a point of contestation between Palestinians and Israelis.

=== British Mandate (1917–1947) ===
Mandatory Palestine in 1946

The first Palestinian nationalist organizations emerged at the end of the World War I. Two political factions emerged. al-Muntada al-Adabi, dominated by the Nashashibi family, militated for the promotion of the Arabic language and culture, for the defense of Islamic values and for an independent Syria and Palestine. In Damascus, al-Nadi al-Arabi, dominated by the Husayni family, defended the same values.

Article 22 of The Covenant of the League of Nations conferred an international legal status upon the territories and people which had ceased to be under the sovereignty of the Ottoman Empire as part of a 'sacred trust of civilization'. Article 7 of the League of Nations Mandate required the establishment of a new, separate, Palestinian nationality for the inhabitants. This meant that Palestinians did not become British citizens, and that Palestine was not annexed into the British dominions. The Mandate document divided the population into Jewish and non-Jewish, and Britain, the Mandatory Power considered the Palestinian population to be composed of religious, not national, groups. Consequently, government censuses in 1922 and 1931 would categorize Palestinians confessionally as Muslims, Christians and Jews, with the category of Arab absent.

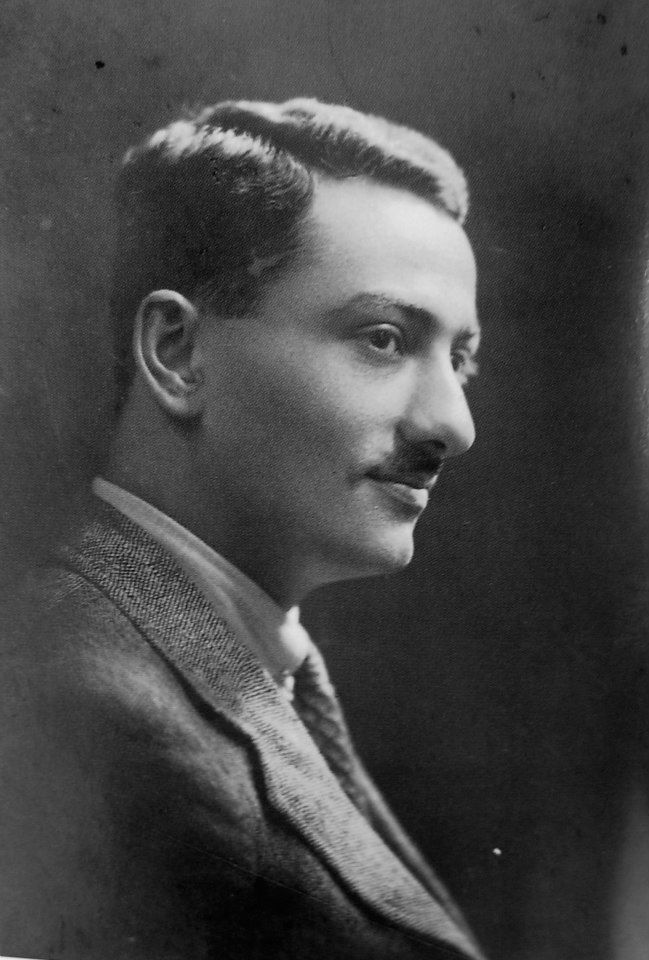
Musa Alami (1897–1984) was a Palestinian nationalist and politician, viewed in the 1940s as a leader of the Palestinians

The articles of the Mandate mentioned the civil and religious rights of the non-Jewish communities in Palestine, but not their political status. At the San Remo conference, it was decided to accept the text of those articles, while inserting in the minutes of the conference an undertaking by the Mandatory Power that this would not involve the surrender of any of the rights hitherto enjoyed by the non-Jewish communities in Palestine. In 1922, the British authorities over Mandatory Palestine proposed a draft constitution that would have granted the Palestinian Arabs representation in a Legislative Council on condition that they accept the terms of the mandate. The Palestine Arab delegation rejected the proposal as "wholly unsatisfactory", noting that "the People of Palestine" could not accept the inclusion of the Balfour Declaration in the constitution's preamble as the basis for discussions. They further took issue with the designation of Palestine as a British "colony of the lowest order." The Arabs tried to get the British to offer an Arab legal establishment again roughly ten years later, but to no avail.

After the British general, Louis Bols, read out the Balfour Declaration in February 1920, some 1,500 Palestinians demonstrated in the streets of Jerusalem.

A month later, during the 1920 Nebi Musa riots, the protests against British rule and Jewish immigration became violent and Bols banned all demonstrations. In May 1921 however, further anti-Jewish riots broke out in Jaffa and dozens of Arabs and Jews were killed in the confrontations.

After the 1920 Nebi Musa riots, the San Remo conference and the failure of Faisal to establish the Kingdom of Greater Syria, a distinctive form of Palestinian Arab nationalism took root between April and July 1920. With the fall of the Ottoman Empire and the French conquest of Syria, coupled with the British conquest and administration of Palestine, the formerly pan-Syrianist mayor of Jerusalem, Musa Qasim Pasha al-Husayni, said "Now, after the recent events in Damascus, we have to effect a complete change in our plans here. Southern Syria no longer exists. We must defend Palestine".

Conflict between Palestinian nationalists and various types of pan-Arabists continued during the British Mandate, but the latter became increasingly marginalized. Two prominent leaders of the Palestinian nationalists were Mohammad Amin al-Husayni, Grand Mufti of Jerusalem, appointed by the British, and Izz ad-Din al-Qassam. After the killing of sheikh Izz ad-Din al-Qassam by the British in 1935, his followers initiated the 1936–39 Arab revolt in Palestine, which began with a general strike in Jaffa and attacks on Jewish and British installations in Nablus. The Arab Higher Committee called for a nationwide general strike, non-payment of taxes, and the closure of municipal governments, and demanded an end to Jewish immigration and a ban of the sale of land to Jews. By the end of 1936, the movement had become a national revolt, and resistance grew during 1937 and 1938. In response, the British declared martial law, dissolved the Arab High Committee and arrested officials from the Supreme Muslim Council who were behind the revolt. By 1939, 5,000 Arabs had been killed in British attempts to quash the revolt; more than 15,000 were wounded.

=== War (1947–1949) ===
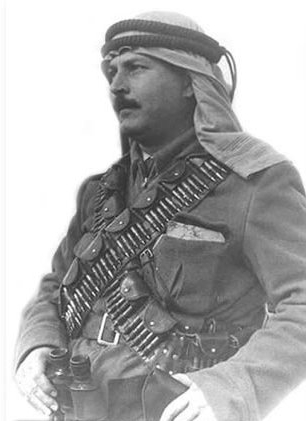
Abd al-Qadir al-Husayni, leader of the Army of the Holy War in 1948

In November 1947, the United Nations General Assembly adopted the Partition Plan, which divided the mandate of Palestine into two states: one majority Arab and one majority Jewish. The Palestinian Arabs rejected the plan and attacked Jewish civilian areas and paramilitary targets. Following Israel's declaration of independence in May 1948, five Arab armies (Lebanon, Egypt, Syria, Iraq, and Transjordan) came to the Palestinian Arabs' aid against the newly founded State of Israel.

The Palestinian Arabs suffered such a major defeat at the end of the war, that the term they use to describe the war is Nakba (the "catastrophe"). Israel took control of much of the territory that would have been allocated to the Arab state had the Palestinian Arabs accepted the UN partition plan. Along with a military defeat, hundreds of thousands of Palestinians fled or were expelled from what became the State of Israel. Israel did not allow the Palestinian refugees of the war to return to Israel.

=== "Lost years" (1949–1967) ===
Boundaries defined in the 1947 UN Partition Plan for Palestine: Area assigned for a Jewish state Area assigned for an Arab state Planned Corpus separatum with the intention that Jerusalem would be neither Jewish nor Arab Armistice Demarcation Lines of 1949 (Green Line): Israel per 1949 armistice lines West Jerusalem and other areas under Israeli control from 1949 Gaza and the West Bank (including East Jerusalem) under Egyptian and Jordanian control till 1967

After the war, there was a hiatus in Palestinian political activity. Khalidi attributes this to the traumatic events of 1947–49, which included the depopulation of over 400 towns and villages and the creation of hundreds of thousands of refugees. 418 villages had been razed, 46,367 buildings, 123 schools, 1,233 mosques, 8 churches and 68 holy shrines, many with a long history, destroyed by Israeli forces. In addition, Palestinians lost from 1.5 to 2 million acres of land, an estimated 150,000 urban and rural homes, and 23,000 commercial structures such as shops and offices. Recent estimates of the cost to Palestinians in property confiscations by Israel from 1948 onwards has concluded that under international law the fair value of compensation to Palestinians would total $300 billion in 2008–2009 prices.

Those parts of British Mandatory Palestine which did not become part of the newly declared Israeli state were occupied by Egypt or annexed by Jordan. At the Jericho Conference on 1 December 1948, 2,000 Palestinian delegates supported a resolution calling for "the unification of Palestine and Transjordan as a step toward full Arab unity". During what Khalidi terms the "lost years" that followed, Palestinians lacked a center of gravity, divided as they were between these countries and others such as Syria, Lebanon, and elsewhere.

In the 1950s, a new generation of Palestinian nationalist groups and movements began to organize clandestinely, stepping out onto the public stage in the 1960s. The traditional Palestinian elite who had dominated negotiations with the British and the Zionists in the Mandate, and who were largely held responsible for the loss of Palestine, were replaced by these new movements whose recruits generally came from poor to middle-class backgrounds and were often students or recent graduates of universities in Cairo, Beirut and Damascus. The potency of the pan-Arabist ideology put forward by Gamal Abdel Nasser—popular among Palestinians for whom Arabism was already an important component of their identity—tended to obscure the identities of the separate Arab states it subsumed.

=== 1967–present ===
Since 1967, Palestinians in the West Bank and the Gaza Strip have lived under military occupation, creating, according to Avram Bornstein, a carceralization of their society. In the meantime, pan-Arabism has waned as an aspect of Palestinian identity. The Israeli occupation of the Gaza Strip and West Bank triggered a second Palestinian exodus and fractured Palestinian political and militant groups, prompting them to give up residual hopes in pan-Arabism. They rallied increasingly around the Palestine Liberation Organization (PLO), which had been formed in Cairo in 1964. The group grew in popularity in the following years, especially under the nationalistic orientation of the leadership of Yasser Arafat. Mainstream secular Palestinian nationalism was grouped together under the umbrella of the PLO whose constituent organizations include Fatah and the Popular Front for the Liberation of Palestine, among other groups who at that time believed that political violence was the only way to "liberate" Palestine. These groups gave voice to a tradition that emerged in the 1960s that argues Palestinian nationalism has deep historical roots, with extreme advocates reading a Palestinian nationalist consciousness and identity back into the history of Palestine over the past few centuries, and even millennia, when such a consciousness is in fact relatively modern.

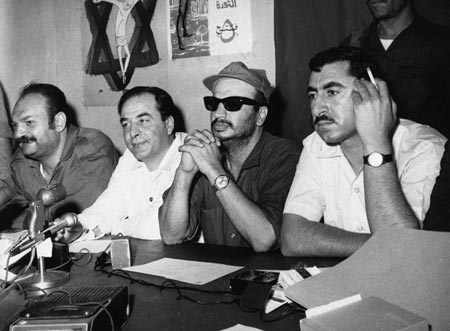
Yasser Arafat, Nayef Hawatmeh and Kamal Nasser in a Jordan press conference in Amman, 1970

The Battle of Karameh and the events of Black September in Jordan contributed to growing Palestinian support for these groups, particularly among Palestinians in exile. Concurrently, among Palestinians in the West Bank and Gaza Strip, a new ideological theme, known as sumud, represented the Palestinian political strategy popularly adopted from 1967 onward. As a concept closely related to the land, agriculture and indigenousness, the ideal image of the Palestinian put forward at this time was that of the peasant (in Arabic, fellah) who stayed put on his land, refusing to leave. A strategy more passive than that adopted by the Palestinian fedayeen, sumud provided an important subtext to the narrative of the fighters, "in symbolizing continuity and connections with the land, with peasantry and a rural way of life."

In 1974, the PLO was recognized as the sole legitimate representative of the Palestinian people by the Arab nation-states and was granted observer status as a national liberation movement by the United Nations that same year. Israel rejected the resolution, calling it "shameful". In a speech to the Knesset, Deputy Premier and Foreign Minister Yigal Allon outlined the government's view that: "No one can expect us to recognize the terrorist organization called the PLO as representing the Palestinians—because it does not. No one can expect us to negotiate with the heads of terror-gangs, who through their ideology and actions, endeavor to liquidate the State of Israel."

In 1975, the United Nations established a subsidiary organ, the Committee on the Exercise of the Inalienable Rights of the Palestinian People, to recommend a program of implementation to enable the Palestinian people to exercise national independence and their rights to self-determination without external interference, national independence and sovereignty, and to return to their homes and property.

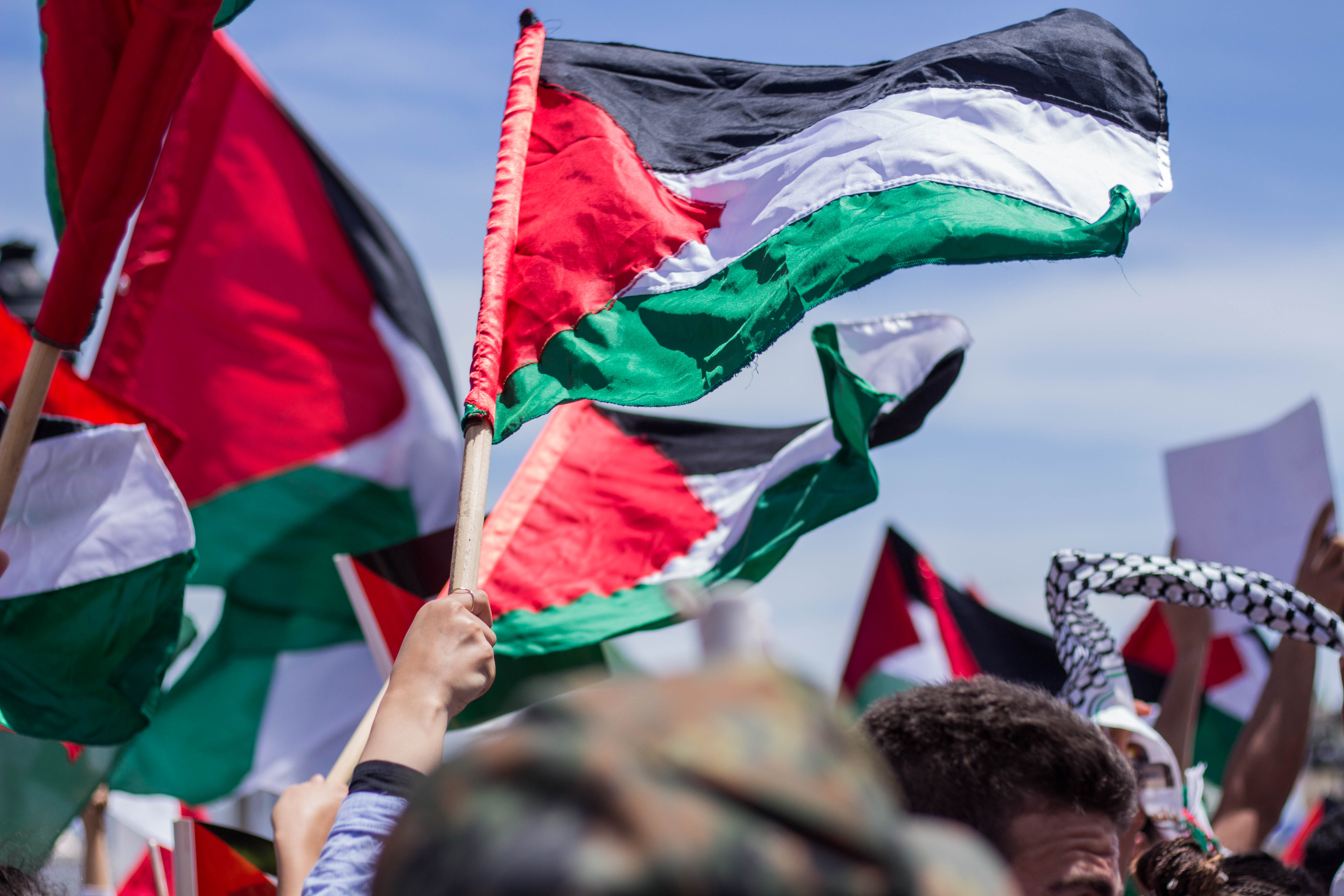
Protest for Palestine in Tunisia

The First Intifada (1987–93) was the first popular uprising against the Israeli occupation of 1967. Followed by the PLO's 1988 proclamation of a State of Palestine, these developments served to further reinforce the Palestinian national identity. After the Gulf War in 1991, Kuwaiti authorities forcibly pressured nearly 200,000 Palestinians to leave Kuwait. The policy which partly led to this exodus was a response to the alignment of PLO leader Yasser Arafat with Saddam Hussein.

The Oslo Accords, the first Israeli–Palestinian interim peace agreement, were signed in 1993. The process was envisioned to last five years, ending in June 1999, when the withdrawal of Israeli forces from the Gaza Strip and the Jericho area began. The expiration of this term without the recognition by Israel of the Palestinian State and without the effective termination of the occupation was followed by the Second Intifada in 2000. The second intifada was more violent than the first. The International Court of Justice observed that since the government of Israel had decided to recognize the PLO as the representative of the Palestinian people, their existence was no longer an issue. The court noted that the Israeli-Palestinian Interim Agreement on the West Bank and the Gaza Strip of 28 September 1995 also referred a number of times to the Palestinian people and its "legitimate rights". According to Thomas Giegerich, with respect to the Palestinian people's right to form a sovereign independent state, "The right of self-determination gives the Palestinian people collectively the inalienable right freely to determine its political status, while Israel, having recognized the Palestinians as a separate people, is obliged to promote and respect this right in conformity with the Charter of the United Nations".

Following the failures of the Second Intifada, a younger generation is emerging that cares less about nationalist ideology than about economic growth. This has been a source of tension between some of the Palestinian political leadership and Palestinian business professionals who desire economic cooperation with Israelis. At an international conference in Bahrain, Palestinian businessman Ashraf Jabari said, "I have no problem working with Israel. It is time to move on. ... The Palestinian Authority does not want peace. They told the families of the businessmen that they are wanted [by police] for participating in the Bahrain workshop."

Since the late 2000s, Palestinians experienced persistent political fragmentation between the Fatah-led Palestinian Authority in the West Bank and the Hamas administration in Gaza. Efforts by Prime Minister Salam Fayyad to professionalize governance in the West Bank achieved administrative improvements but were criticized for lacking a political foundation. By the mid-2010s, Palestinian institutions weakened further as reconciliation efforts faltered and external pressures increased. Hamas consolidated control in Gaza, while Palestinian Authority structures in the West Bank lost credibility amid ineffectual diplomacy.

The October 7, 2023 Hamas attacks on Israel and the subsequent war in Gaza deepened this crisis, devastating Gaza's infrastructure and reshaping regional and international discourse. As Palestinians are "a national group," of which the Palestinians of the Gaza Strip form a part, the International Committee of Jurists, among other legal experts, have called on States to prevent genocide in Gaza. South Africa has initiated a case against Israel at the International Court of Justice, accusing Israel of committing genocide. The case is ongoing.

Despite the conflict, Israelis and Palestinians inhabit an interlinked ecosystem in which cooperation remains vital for public health and environmental protection, with potential for mutual benefits.

== Demographics ==
Year	Post-Nakba distribution of global Palestinian population (%)								Global Population (m)	Source
Year	West Bank	Gaza	Israel	Jordan	Lebanon	Syria	Gulf and other Arab states	Other	Global Population (m)	Source
1952	47	18	11	9	7	0	5			Abu-Lughod
1961	37	17	11	17	1	5	5			Abu-Lughod
1967	22	13	15	27	8	5	8	2		Abu-Lughod
1970	20	11	15	30	8	5	9	2		Abu-Lughod
1975	19	11	16	28	8	5	11	2		Abu-Lughod
1980	17	10	16	25	8	5	15	4		Abu-Lughod
1985	16	9	16	23	8	5	16	7		Center for Policy Analysis on Palestine
1990	19	11	13	32	6	5	8	8	5.8	Center for Policy Analysis on Palestine
1995	24	13	12	29	6	5	8	3	6.8	Adlakha et al.
2002	25	14	11	31	5	5	6	3	8.8	PCBS
2015	23	15	12	32			13	6	12.4	PCBS

In the absence of a comprehensive census including all Palestinian diaspora populations, and those that have remained within what was British Mandate Palestine, exact population figures are difficult to determine. The Palestinian Central Bureau of Statistics (PCBS) announced at the end of 2015 that the number of Palestinians worldwide at the end of 2015 was 12.37 million of which the number still residing within historic Palestine was 6.22 million. In 2022, Arnon Soffer estimated that in the territory of former Mandatory Palestine (now encompassing Israel and the Palestinian territories of the West Bank and Gaza Strip), there's a Palestinian population of 7.503 million, making up 51.16% of the total population. Within Israel proper, Palestinians constitute almost 21 percent of the population as part of its Arab citizens.

In 2005, a critical review of the PCBS figures and methodology was conducted by the American-Israel Demographic Research Group (AIDRG). In their report, they claimed that several errors in the PCBS methodology and assumptions artificially inflated the numbers by a total of 1.3 million. The PCBS numbers were cross-checked against a variety of other sources (e.g., asserted birth rates based on fertility rate assumptions for a given year were checked against Palestinian Ministry of Health figures as well as Ministry of Education school enrollment figures six years later; immigration numbers were checked against numbers collected at border crossings, etc.). The errors claimed in their analysis included: birth rate errors (308,000), immigration & emigration errors (310,000), failure to account for migration to Israel (105,000), double-counting Jerusalem Arabs (210,000), counting former residents now living abroad (325,000) and other discrepancies (82,000). The results of their research was also presented before the United States House of Representatives on 8 March 2006.

The study was criticised by Sergio DellaPergola, a demographer at the Hebrew University of Jerusalem. DellaPergola accused the authors of the AIDRG report of misunderstanding basic principles of demography on account of their lack of expertise in the subject, but he also acknowledged that he did not take into account the emigration of Palestinians and thinks it has to be examined, as well as the birth and mortality statistics of the Palestinian Authority. He also accused AIDRG of selective use of data and multiple systematic errors in their analysis, claiming that the authors assumed the Palestinian Electoral registry to be complete even though registration is voluntary, and they used an unrealistically low total fertility ratio (a statistical abstraction of births per woman) to reanalyse that data in a "typical circular mistake." DellaPergola estimated the Palestinian population of the West Bank and Gaza at the end of 2005 as 3.33 million, or 3.57 million if East Jerusalem is included. These figures are only slightly lower than the official Palestinian figures. The Israeli Civil Administration put the number of Palestinians in the West Bank at 2,657,029 as of May 2012.

The AIDRG study was also criticized by Ian Lustick, who accused its authors of multiple methodological errors and a political agenda.

In 2009, at the request of the PLO, "Jordan revoked the citizenship of thousands of Palestinians to keep them from remaining permanently in the country."

Many Palestinians have settled in the United States, particularly in the Chicago area.

In total, an estimated 600,000 Palestinians are thought to reside in the Americas. Palestinian emigration to South America began for economic reasons that pre-dated the Arab-Israeli conflict, but continued to grow thereafter. Many emigrants were from the Bethlehem area. Those emigrating to Latin America were mainly Christian. Half of those of Palestinian origin in Latin America live in Chile, El Salvador and Honduras also have substantial Palestinian populations. These two countries have had presidents of Palestinian ancestry (Antonio Saca in El Salvador and Carlos Roberto Flores in Honduras). Belize, which has a smaller Palestinian population, has a Palestinian minister – Said Musa. Schafik Jorge Handal, Salvadoran politician and former guerrilla leader, was the son of Palestinian immigrants.

=== Refugees ===
Clickable map of the more than 400 depopulated towns and villages of the 1948 Palestinian exodus (red) and the c.60 modern day Palestinian refugee camps (blue)

In 2006, there were 4,255,120 Palestinians registered as refugees with the United Nations Relief and Works Agency (UNRWA). This number includes the descendants of refugees who fled or were expelled during the 1948 war, but excludes those who have since then emigrated to areas outside of UNRWA's remit. Based on these figures, almost half of all Palestinians are registered refugees. The 993,818 Palestinian refugees in the Gaza Strip and 705,207 Palestinian refugees in the West Bank, who hail from towns and villages now located within the borders of Israel, are included in these figures.

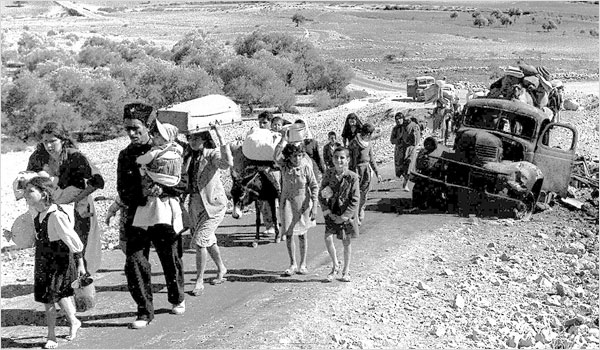
Palestinian refugees in 1948

UNRWA figures do not include some 274,000 people, or 1 in 5.5 of all Arab residents of Israel, who are internally displaced Palestinian refugees. According to British historian Perry Anderson, it is estimated that half of the population in the Palestinian territories are refugees.

Palestinian refugee camps in Lebanon, Syria, Jordan, and the West Bank are organized according to a refugee family's village or place of origin. Among the first things that children born in the camps learn is the name of their village of origin. David McDowall writes that, "[...] a yearning for Palestine permeates the whole refugee community and is most ardently espoused by the younger refugees, for whom home exists only in the imagination."

Israeli policy to prevent the refugees from returning to their homes was initially formulated by David Ben Gurion and Joseph Weitz, director of the Jewish National Fund was formally adopted by the Israeli cabinet in June 1948. In December of that year the UN adopted resolution 194, which resolved "that the refugees wishing to return to their homes and live at peace with their neighbors should be permitted to do so at the earliest practicable date, and that compensation should be paid for the property of those choosing not to return and for loss of or damage to property which, under principles of international law or in equity, should be made good by the Governments or authorities responsible." Despite much of the international community, including the US President Harry Truman, insisting that the repatriation of Palestinian refugees was essential, Israel refused to accept the principle. In the intervening years Israel has consistently refused to change its position and has introduced further legislation to hinder Palestinians refugees from returning and reclaiming their land and confiscated property.

In keeping with an Arab League resolution in 1965, most Arab countries have refused to grant citizenship to Palestinians, arguing that it would be a threat to their right of return to their homes in Palestine. In 2012, Egypt deviated from this practice by granting citizenship to 50,000 Palestinians, mostly from the Gaza Strip.

Palestinians living in Lebanon are deprived of basic civil rights. They cannot own homes or land and are barred from becoming lawyers, engineers and doctors.

=== Religion ===
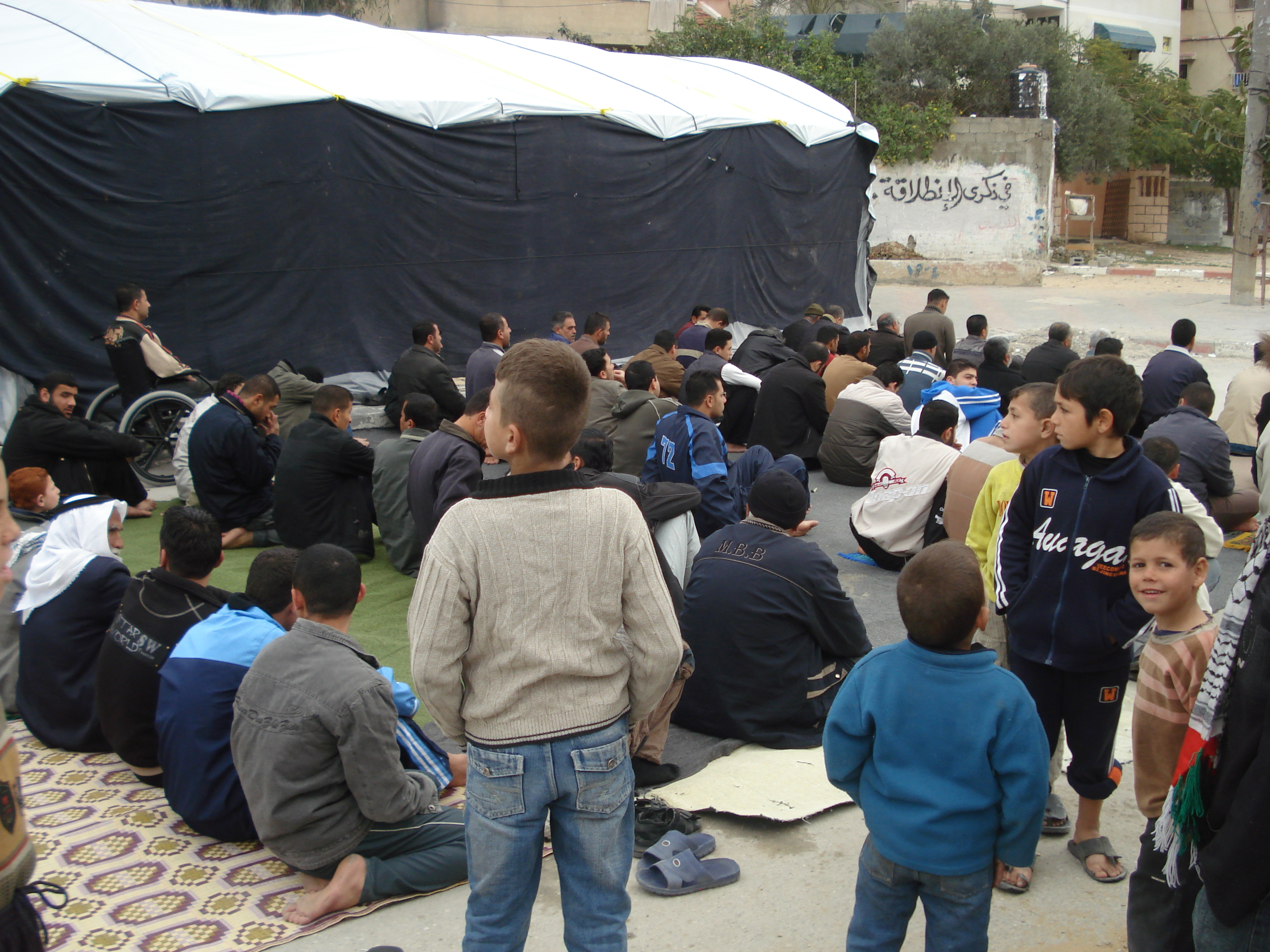
Praying Palestinians in Gaza in 2009.

The majority of Palestinians are Muslim, the vast majority of whom are followers of the Sunni branch of Islam, with a small minority of Ahmadiyya. Palestinian Christians represent a significant minority of 6%, and belong to several denominations, followed by much smaller religious communities, including Druze and Samaritans. Palestinian Jews – considered Palestinian by the Palestinian National Charter adopted by the Palestine Liberation Organization (PLO) which defined them as those "Jews who had normally resided in Palestine until the beginning of the Zionist invasion" – today identify as Israelis (with the exception of a few individuals). Palestinian Jews almost universally abandoned any such identity after the establishment of Israel and their incorporation into the Israeli Jewish population, which was originally composed of Jewish immigrants from around the world.

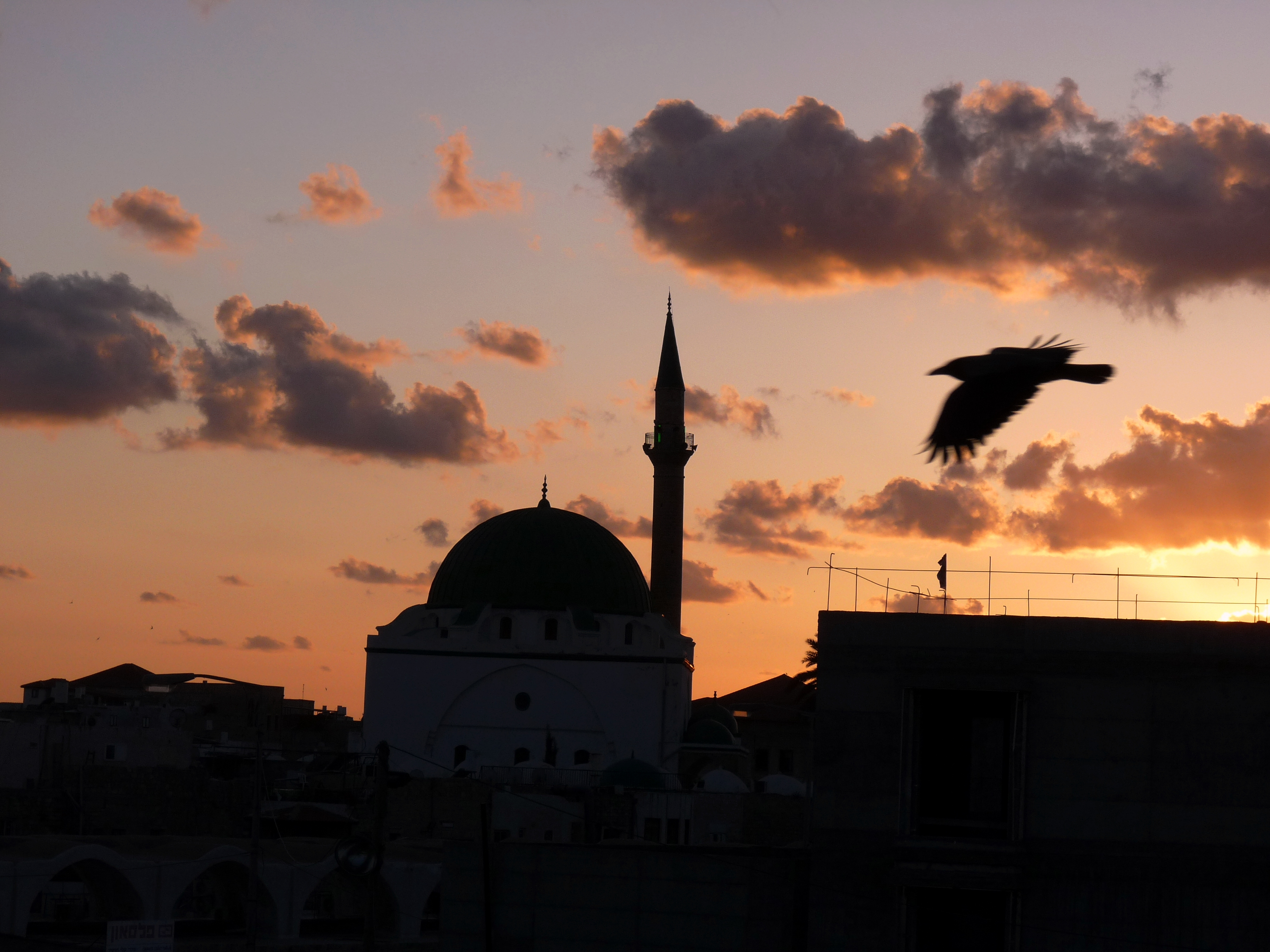
Silhouette of East Jerusalem

Until the end of the 19th century, cross-cultural syncretism between Islamic and Christian symbols and figures in religious practice was common in the Palestinian countryside, where most villages did not have local mosques or churches. Popular feast days, such as Thursday of the Dead, were celebrated by both Muslims and Christians and shared prophets and saints include Jonah, who is venerated in Halhul as both a Biblical and Islamic prophet, and St. George, who is known in Arabic as al-Khdir. Villagers would pay tribute to local patron saints at maqams – domed single rooms often placed in the shadow of an ancient carob or oak tree; many of them are rooted in Jewish, Samaritan, Christian and sometimes pagan traditions. Saints, taboo by the standards of orthodox Islam, mediated between man and God, and shrines to saints and holy men dotted the Palestinian landscape. Ali Qleibo, a Palestinian anthropologist, states that this built evidence constitutes "an architectural testimony to Christian/Moslem Palestinian religious sensibility and its roots in ancient Semitic religions."

Religion as constitutive of individual identity was accorded a minor role within Palestinian social structure until the latter half of the 19th century. Jean Moretain, a priest writing in 1848, wrote that a Christian in Palestine was "distinguished only by the fact that he belonged to a particular clan. If a certain tribe was Christian, then an individual would be Christian, but without knowledge of what distinguished his faith from that of a Muslim."

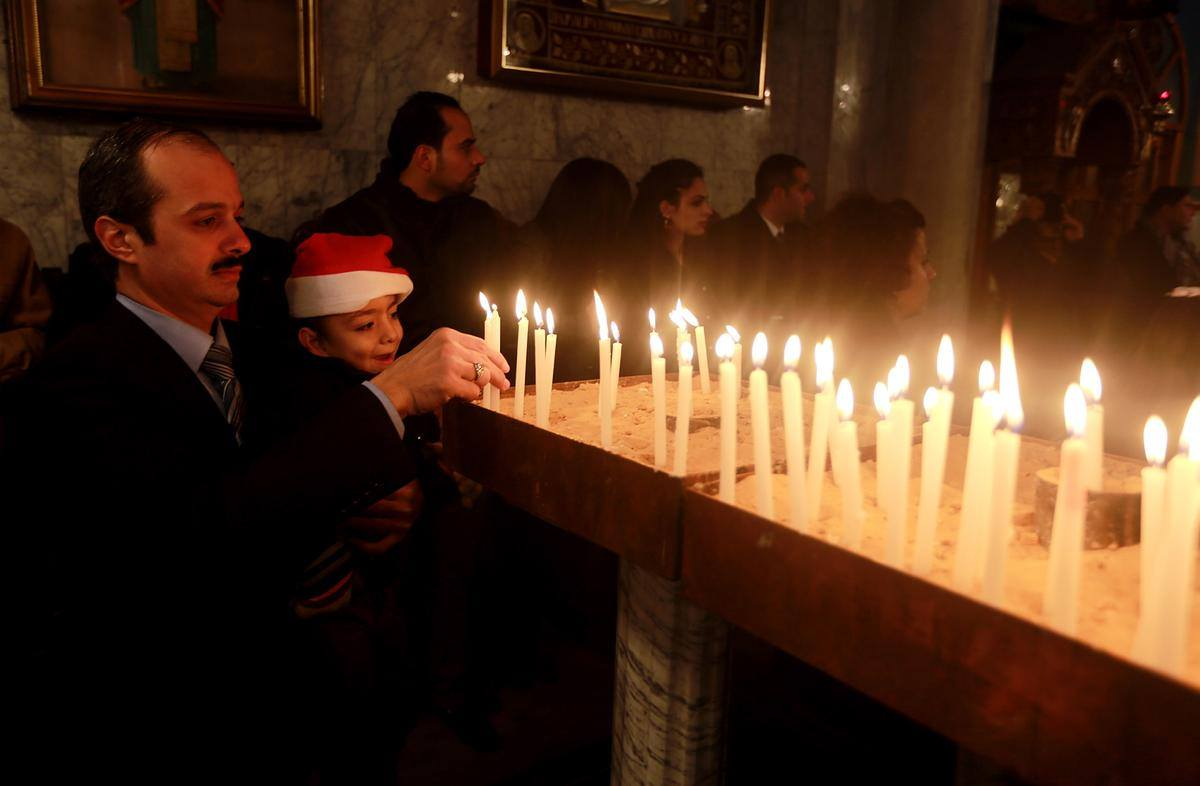
Christians from Gaza

The concessions granted to France and other Western powers by the Ottoman Sultanate in the aftermath of the Crimean War had a significant impact on contemporary Palestinian religious cultural identity. Religion was transformed into an element "constituting the individual/collective identity in conformity with orthodox precepts", and formed a major building block in the political development of Palestinian nationalism.

The British census of 1922 registered 752,048 inhabitants in Palestine, consisting of 660,641 Palestinian Arabs (Muslim and Christian Arabs), 83,790 Palestinian Jews, and 7,617 persons belonging to other groups. The corresponding percentage breakdown is 87% Muslim and Christian Arab and 11% Jewish.

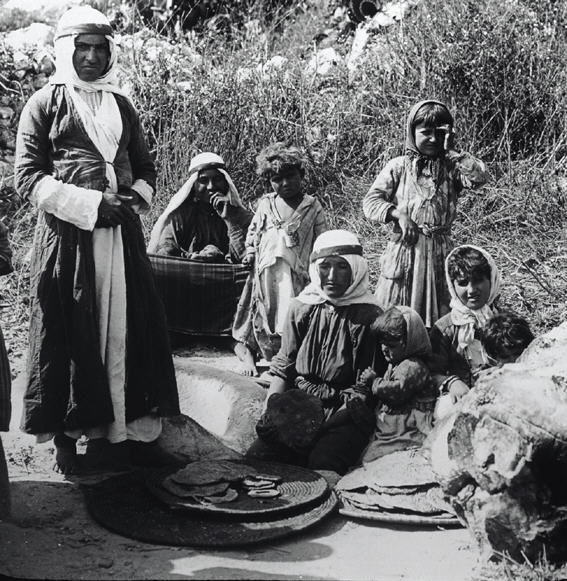
Palestinian Druze family making bread 1920

Bernard Sabella of Bethlehem University estimates that 6% of the Palestinian population worldwide is Christian and that 56% of them live outside of historic Palestine. According to the Palestinian Academic Society for the Study of International Affairs, the Palestinian population of the West Bank and Gaza Strip is 97% Muslim and 3% Christian. The vast majority of the Palestinian community in Chile follow Christianity, largely Eastern Orthodox and some Roman Catholic, and in fact the number of Palestinian Christians in the diaspora in Chile alone exceeds the number of those who have remained in their homeland. Saint George is the patron saint of the Palestinian Christians.

The Druze became Israeli citizens and Druze males serve in the Israel Defense Forces, though some individuals identify as "Palestinian Druze". According to Salih al-Shaykh, most Druze do not consider themselves to be Palestinian: "their Arab identity emanates in the main from the common language and their socio-cultural background, but is detached from any national political conception. It is not directed at Arab countries or Arab nationality or the Palestinian people, and does not express sharing any fate with them. From this point of view, their identity is Israel, and this identity is stronger than their Arab identity".

There are also about 350 Samaritans who carry Palestinian identity cards and live in the West Bank while a roughly equal number live in Holon and carry Israeli citizenship. Those who live in the West Bank also are represented in the legislature for the Palestinian National Authority. They are commonly referred to among Palestinians as the "Jews of Palestine", and maintain their own unique cultural identity.

Jews who identify as Palestinian Jews are few, but include Israeli Jews who are part of the Neturei Karta group, and Uri Davis, an Israeli citizen and self-described Palestinian Jew (who converted to Islam in 2008 in order to marry Miyassar Abu Ali) who serves as an observer member in the Palestine National Council.

Bahá'u'lláh, founder of the Baháʼí Faith spent his last years in Acre, then part of the Ottoman Empire. He remained there for 24 years, where a shrine was erected in his honor.

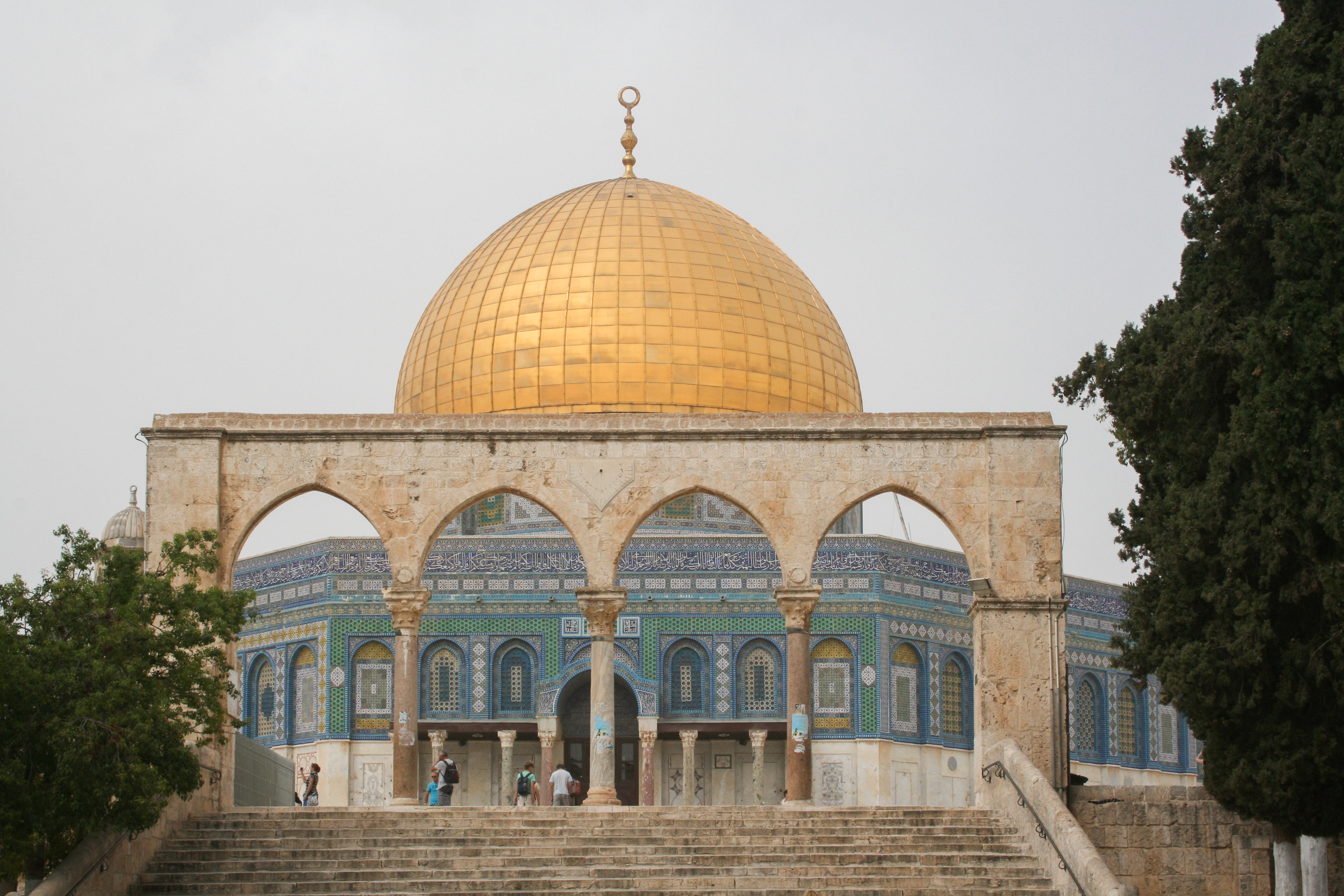
The Dome of the Rock in the Old City of Jerusalem

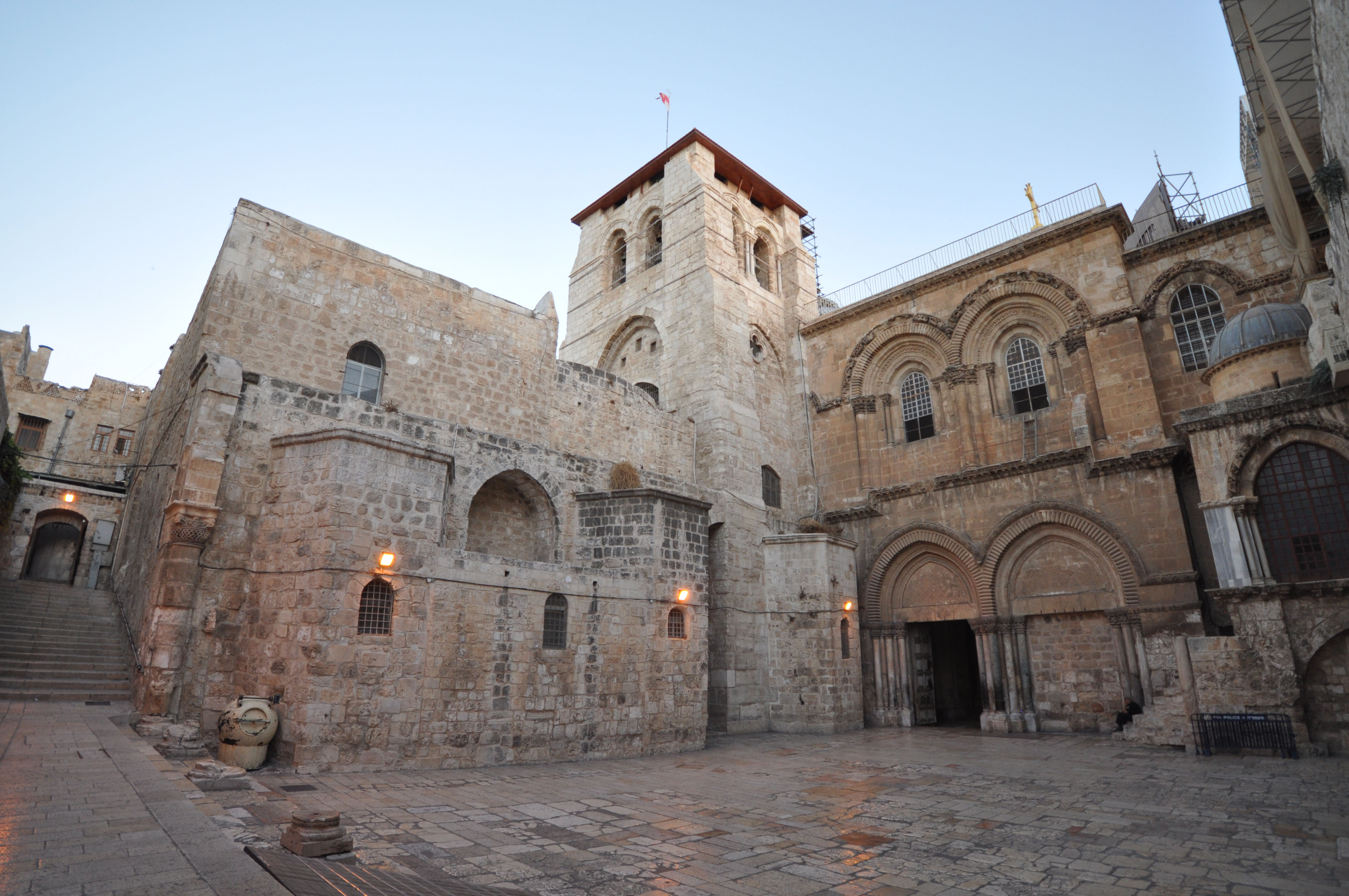
The Church of the Holy Sepulchre in Jerusalem, the holiest site in Christianity

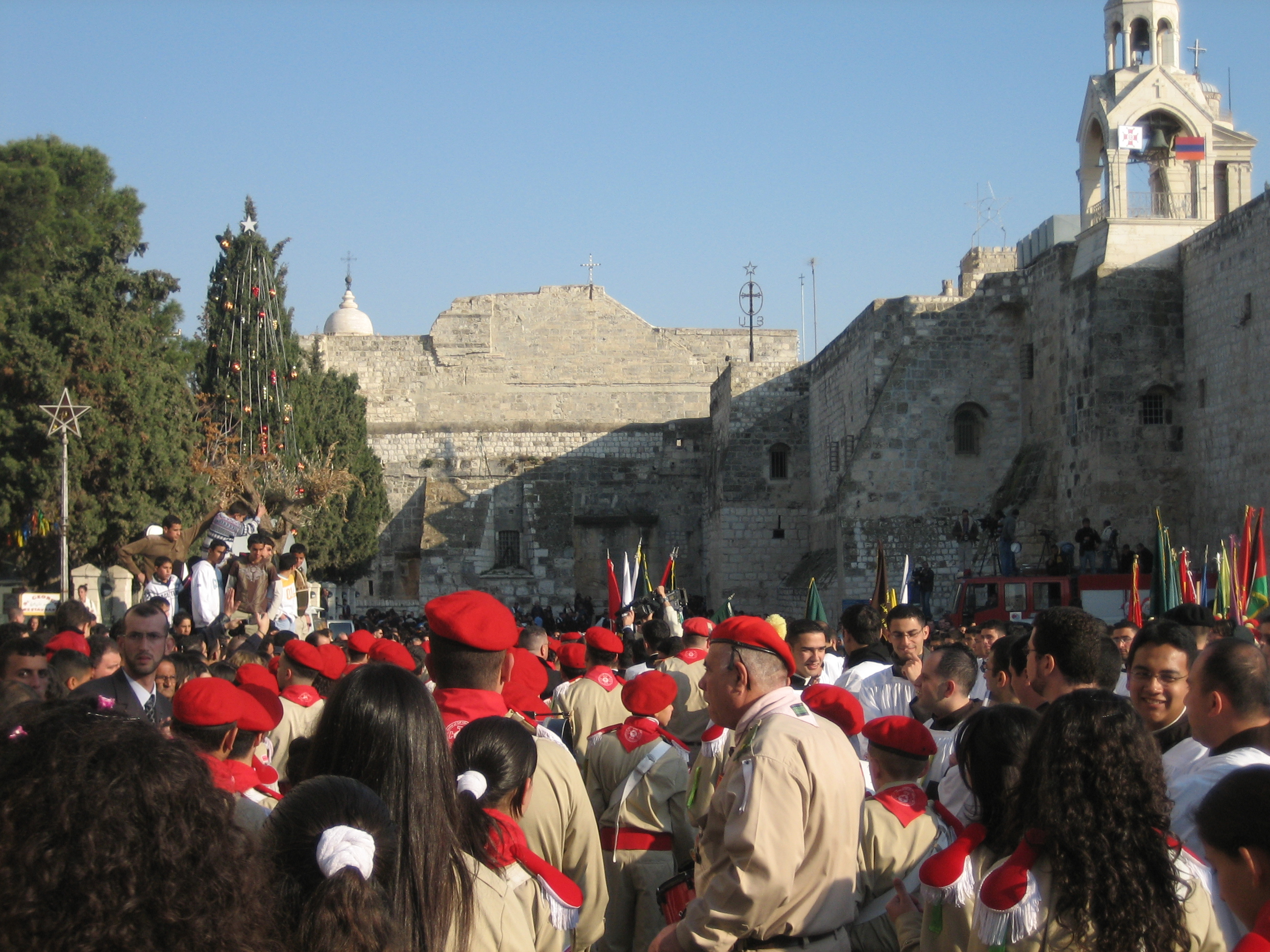
Palestinian Christian Scouts on Christmas Eve in front of the Nativity Church in Bethlehem, 2006

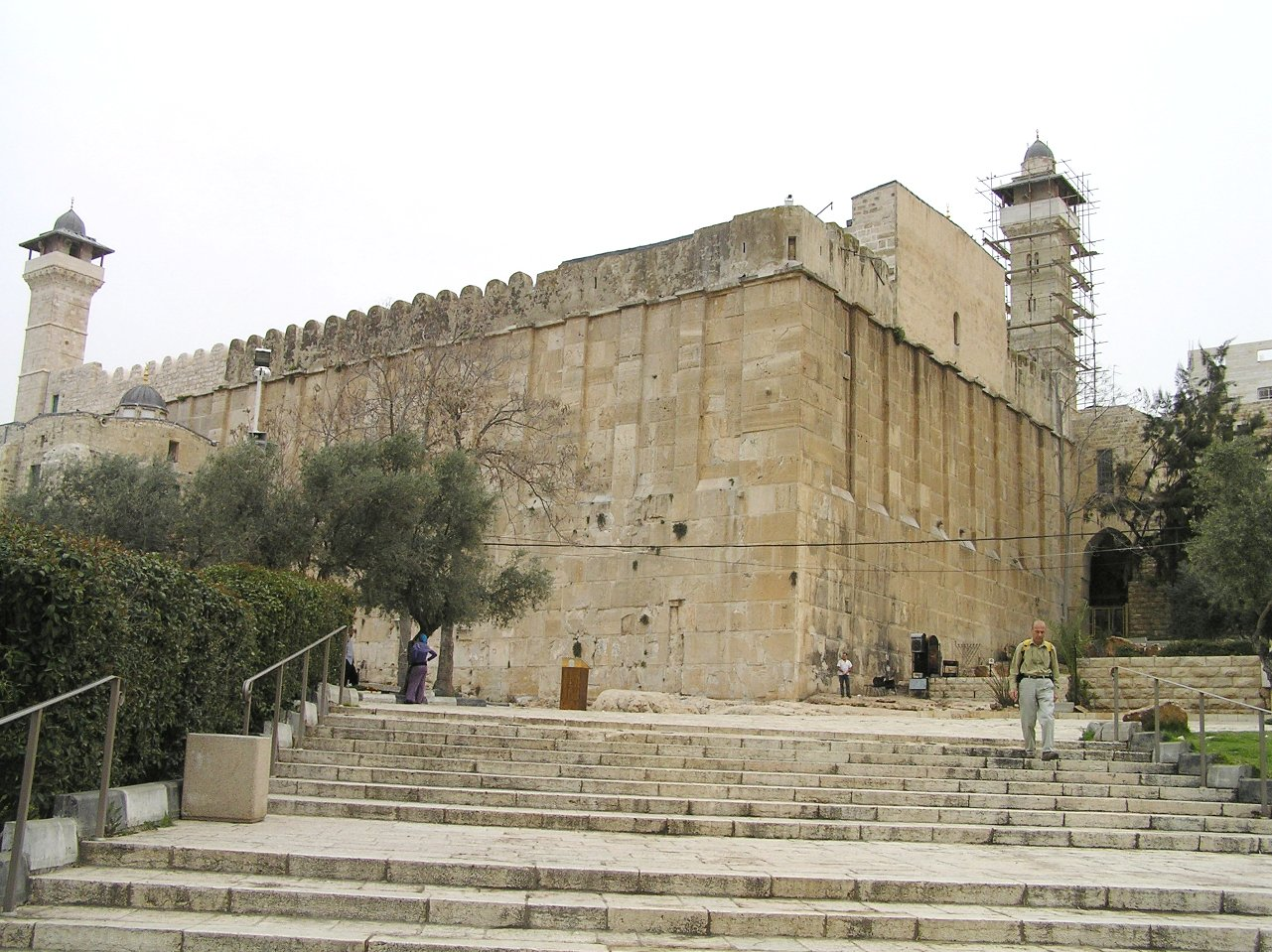
Cave of the Patriarchs in Hebron

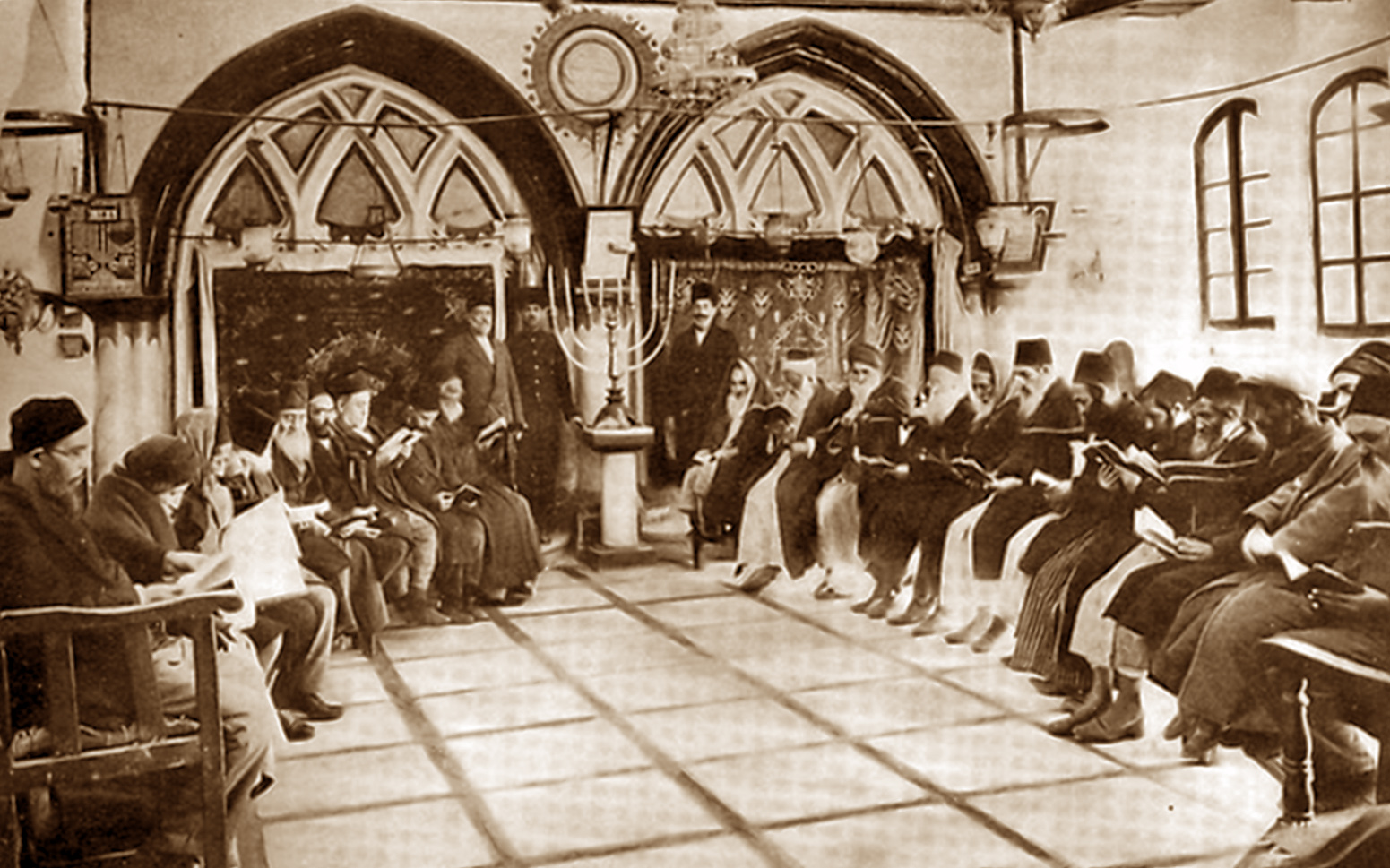
Palestinian Jews in Ben Zakai house of prayer, Jerusalem, 1893

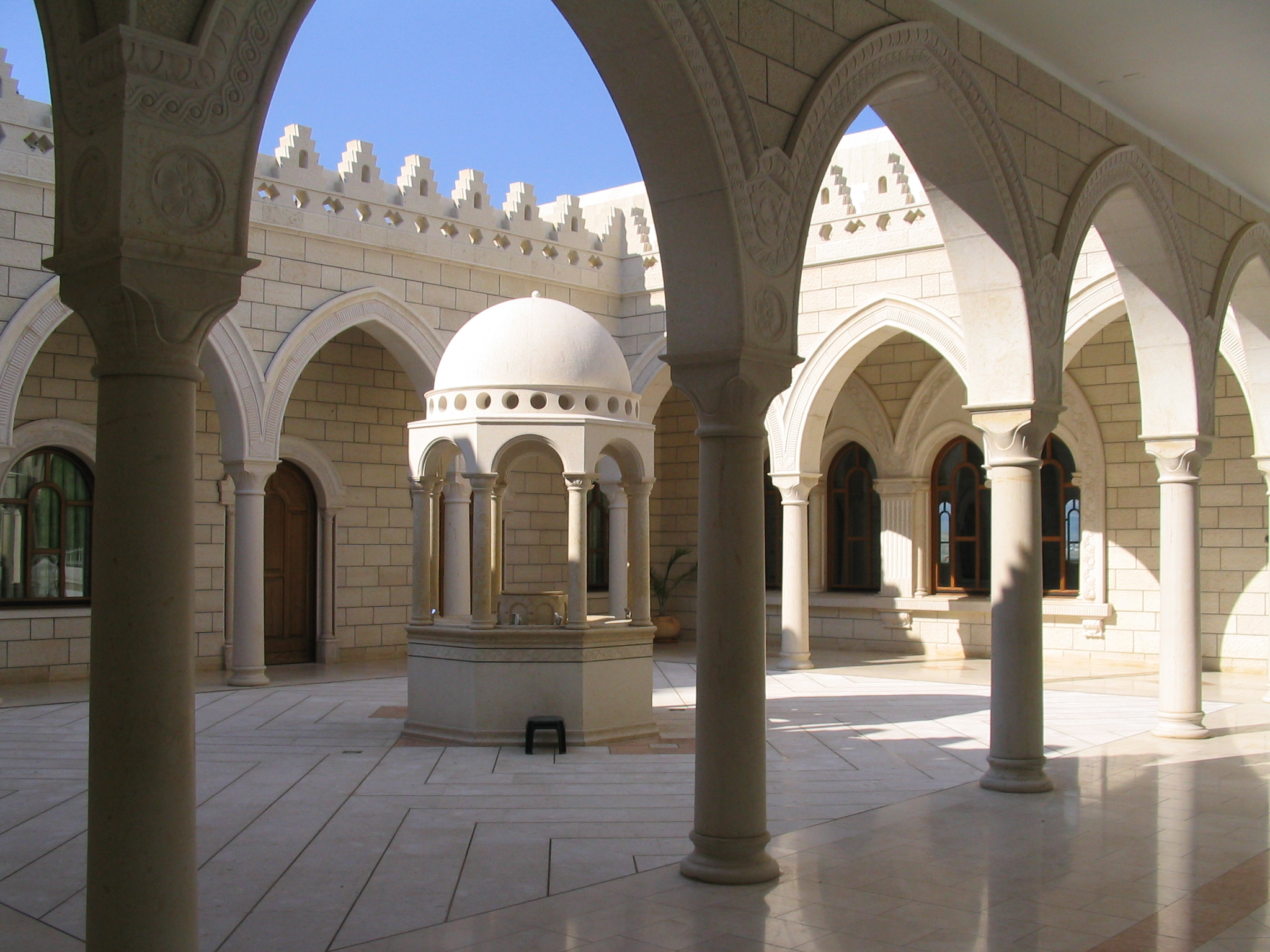
Tomb of Shuaib in Hittin

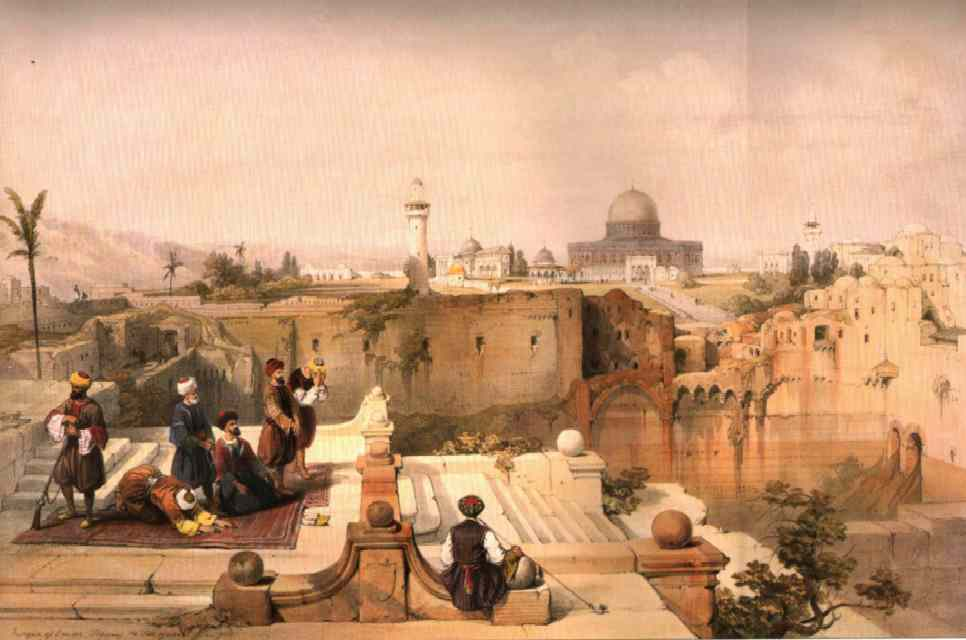
Palestinian Muslims pray in Jerusalem, 1840. By David Roberts, in The Holy Land, Syria, Idumea, Arabia, Egypt, and Nubia

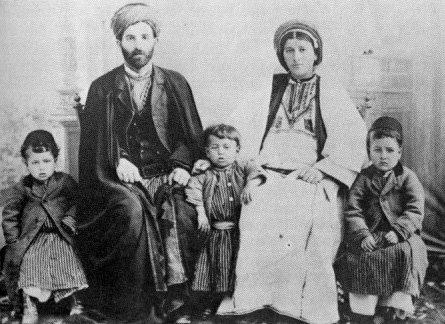
A Palestinian Christian family in Ramallah, 1905

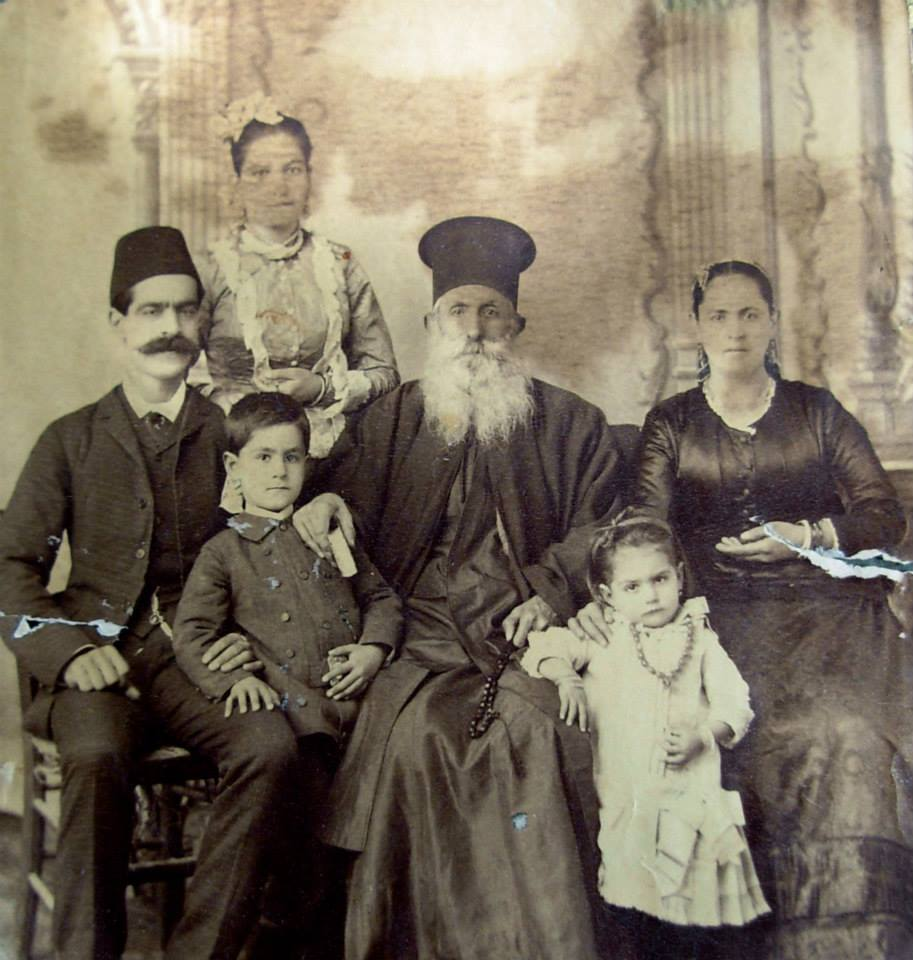
Palestinian Eastern Orthodox priest from Jerusalem with his family of three generations, circa 1893

=== Current demographics ===
According to the PCBS, there are an estimated 4,816,503 Palestinians in the Palestinian territories as of 2016, of whom 2,935,368 live in the West Bank and 1,881,135 in the Gaza Strip. According to the Israel Central Bureau of Statistics, there were 1,658,000 Arab citizens of Israel as of 2013. Both figures include Palestinians in East Jerusalem.

In 2008, Minority Rights Group International estimated the number of Palestinians in Jordan to be about 3 million. The UNRWA put their number at 2.3 million as of 2024.

== Society ==
=== Language ===
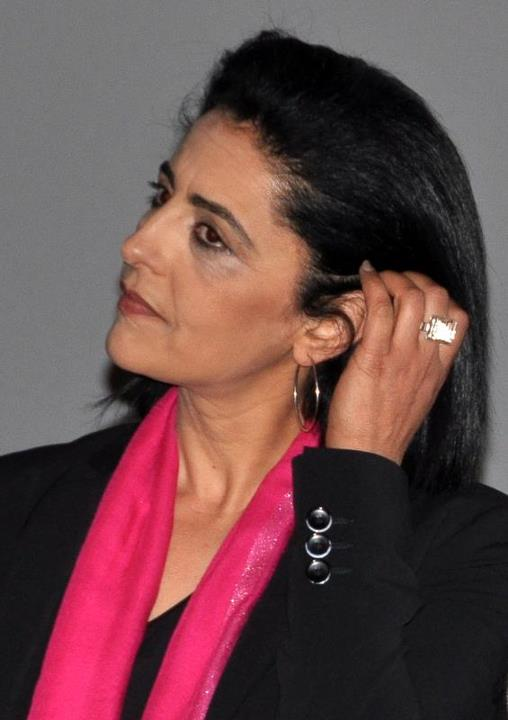
Areen Omari, a Palestinian actress and producer, attends a motion picture ceremony

Palestinian Arabic is a subgroup of the broader Levantine Arabic dialect. Prior to the 7th century Islamic Conquest and Arabization of the Levant, the primary languages spoken in Palestine, among the predominantly Christian and Jewish communities, were Aramaic, Greek, and Syriac. Arabic was also spoken in some areas. Palestinian Arabic, like other variations of the Levantine dialect, exhibits substantial influences in lexicon from Aramaic.

Palestinian Arabic has three primary sub-variations, Rural, Urban, and Bedouin, with the pronunciation of the Qāf serving as a shibboleth to distinguish between the three main Palestinian sub-dialects: The urban variety notes a [Q] sound, while the rural variety (spoken in the villages around major cities) have a [K] for the [Q]. The Bedouin variety of Palestine (spoken mainly in the southern region and along the Jordan valley) use a [G] instead of [Q].

It is well established in scholarship that Palestinians, particularly the fellahin have preserved the original Semitic place names of many sites mentioned in the Bible, as was documented by the American geographer Edward Robinson in the 19th century.

Palestinians who live or work in Israel generally can also speak Modern Hebrew, as do some who live in the West Bank and Gaza Strip.

=== Education ===
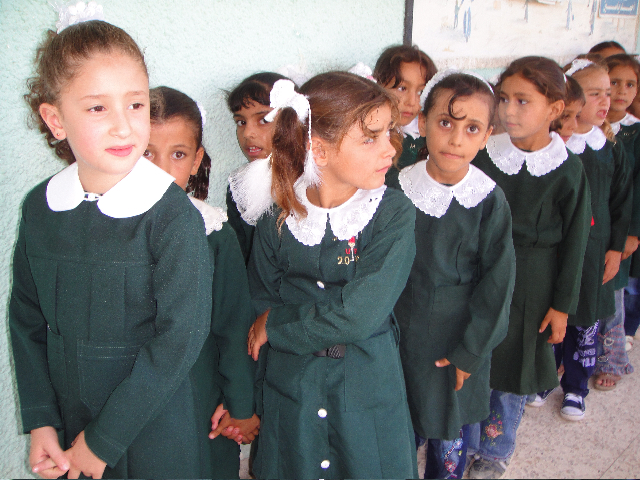
Palestinian schoolgirls

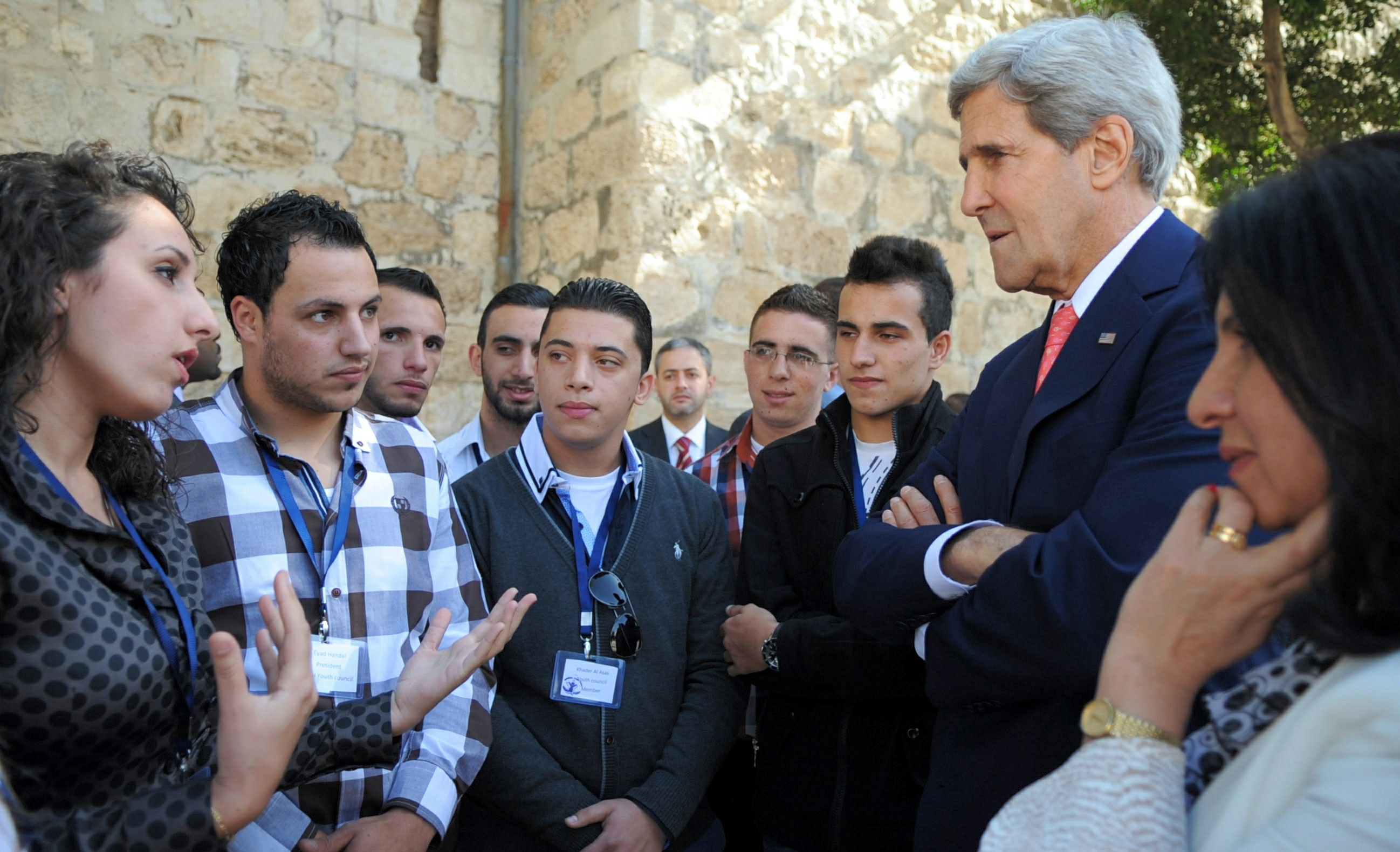
Palestinian students and John Kerry

The literacy rate of Palestine was 96.3% according to a 2014 report by the United Nations Development Programme, which is high by international standards. There is a gender difference in the population aged above 15 with 5.9% of women considered illiterate compared to 1.6% of men. Illiteracy among women has fallen from 20.3% in 1997 to less than 6% in 2014.

Palestinian intellectuals, among them May Ziadeh and Khalil Beidas, were an integral part of the Arab intelligentsia. Educational levels among Palestinians have traditionally been high. In the 1960s the West Bank had a higher percentage of its adolescent population enrolled in high school education than did Lebanon. Claude Cheysson, France's Minister for Foreign Affairs under the first Mitterrand Presidency, held in the mid-eighties that, 'even thirty years ago, (Palestinians) probably already had the largest educated elite of all the Arab peoples.'

Contributions to Palestinian culture have been made by diaspora figures including Edward Said and Ghada Karmi, Arab citizens of Israel including Emile Habibi, and Jordanians including Ibrahim Nasrallah.

=== Women and family ===
In the 19th and early 20th century, there were some well known Palestinian families, which included the Khalidi family, the al-Husayni family, the Nashashibi family, the Tuqan family, the Nusaybah family, Qudwa family, Shawish clan, Shurrab family, Al-Zaghab family, Al-Khalil family, Ridwan dynasty, Al-Zeitawi family, Abu Ghosh clan, Barghouti family, Doghmush clan, Douaihy family, Hilles clan, Jarrar family, and the Jayyusi family. Since various conflicts with Zionists began, some of the communities have subsequently left Palestine. The role of women varies among Palestinians, with both progressive and ultra-conservative opinions existing. Other groups of Palestinians, such as the Negev Bedouins or Druze, may no longer self-identify as Palestinian for political reasons.

== Culture ==
Ali Qleibo, a Palestinian anthropologist, has critiqued Muslim historiography for assigning the beginning of Palestinian cultural identity to the advent of Islam in the 7th century. In describing the effect of such historiography, he writes:

Pagan origins are disavowed. As such the peoples who populated Palestine throughout history have discursively rescinded their own history and religion as they adopted the religion, language, and culture of Islam.

That the peasant culture of the large fellahin class showed features of cultures other than Islam was a conclusion arrived at by some Western scholars and explorers who mapped and surveyed Palestine during the latter half of the 19th century, and these ideas were to influence 20th-century debates on Palestinian identity by local and international ethnographers. The contributions of the 'nativist' ethnographies produced by Tawfiq Canaan and other Palestinian writers and published in The Journal of the Palestine Oriental Society (1920–48) were driven by the concern that the "native culture of Palestine", and in particular peasant society, was being undermined by the forces of modernity. Salim Tamari writes that:

Implicit in their scholarship (and made explicit by Canaan himself) was another theme, namely that the peasants of Palestine represent—through their folk norms ... the living heritage of all the accumulated ancient cultures that had appeared in Palestine (principally the Canaanite, Philistine, Hebraic, Nabatean, Syrio-Aramaic and Arab).

Palestinian culture is closely related to those of the nearby Levantine countries such as Lebanon, Syria, and Jordan, and the Arab World. Cultural contributions to the fields of art, literature, music, costume and cuisine express the characteristics of the Palestinian experience and show signs of common origin despite the geographical separation between the Palestinian territories, Israel and the diaspora.

Al-Quds Capital of Arab Culture is an initiative undertaken by UNESCO under the Cultural Capitals Program to promote Arab culture and encourage cooperation in the Arab region. The opening event was launched in March 2009.

=== Cuisine ===
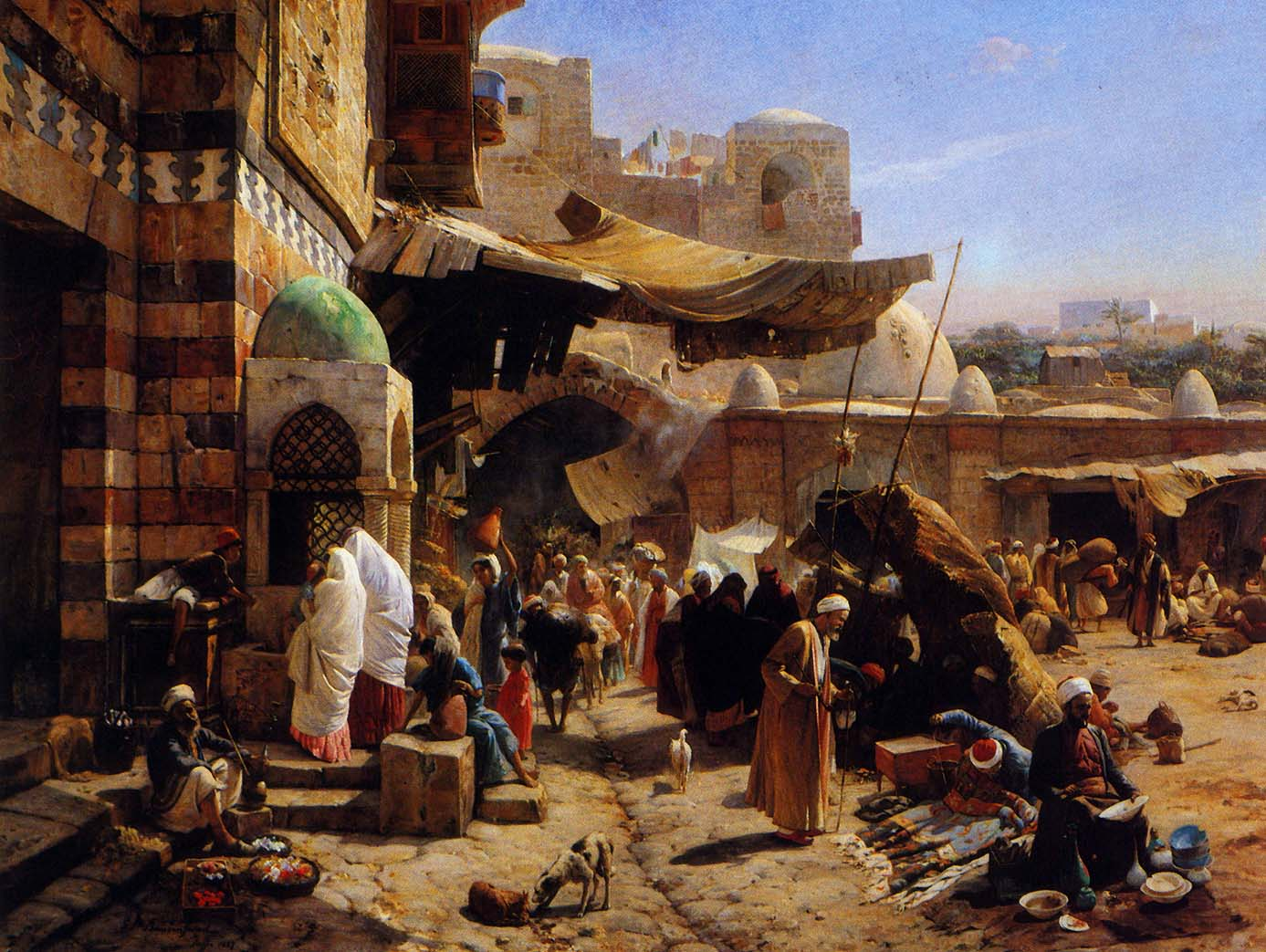
Palestinian market at Jaffa, 1877 painting

Palestine's history of rule by many different empires is reflected in Palestinian cuisine, which has benefited from various cultural contributions and exchanges. Generally speaking, modern Syrian-Palestinian dishes have been influenced by the rule of three major Islamic groups: the Arabs, the Persian-influenced Arabs and the Turks. The Arabs who conquered Syria and Palestine had simple culinary traditions primarily based on the use of rice, lamb and yogurt, as well as dates. The already simple cuisine did not advance for centuries due to Islam's strict rules of parsimony and restraint, until the rise of the Abbasids, who established Baghdad as their capital. Baghdad was historically located on Persian soil and henceforth, Persian culture was integrated into Arab culture during the 9th–11th centuries and spread throughout central areas of the empire.

There are several foods native to Palestine that are well known in the Arab world, such as, kinafe Nabulsi, Nabulsi cheese (cheese of Nablus), Ackawi cheese (cheese of Acre) and musakhan. Kinafe originated in Nablus, as well as the sweetened Nabulsi cheese used to fill it. Another very popular food is Palestinian Kofta or Kufta.

Mezze describes an assortment of dishes laid out on the table for a meal that takes place over several hours, a characteristic common to Mediterranean cultures. Some common mezze dishes are hummus, tabouleh,baba ghanoush, labaneh, and zate 'u zaatar, which is the pita bread dipping of olive oil and ground thyme and sesame seeds.

Entrées that are eaten throughout the Palestinian territories, include waraq al-'inib – boiled grape leaves wrapped around cooked rice and ground lamb. Mahashi is an assortment of stuffed vegetables such as, zucchinis, potatoes, cabbage and in Gaza, chard.

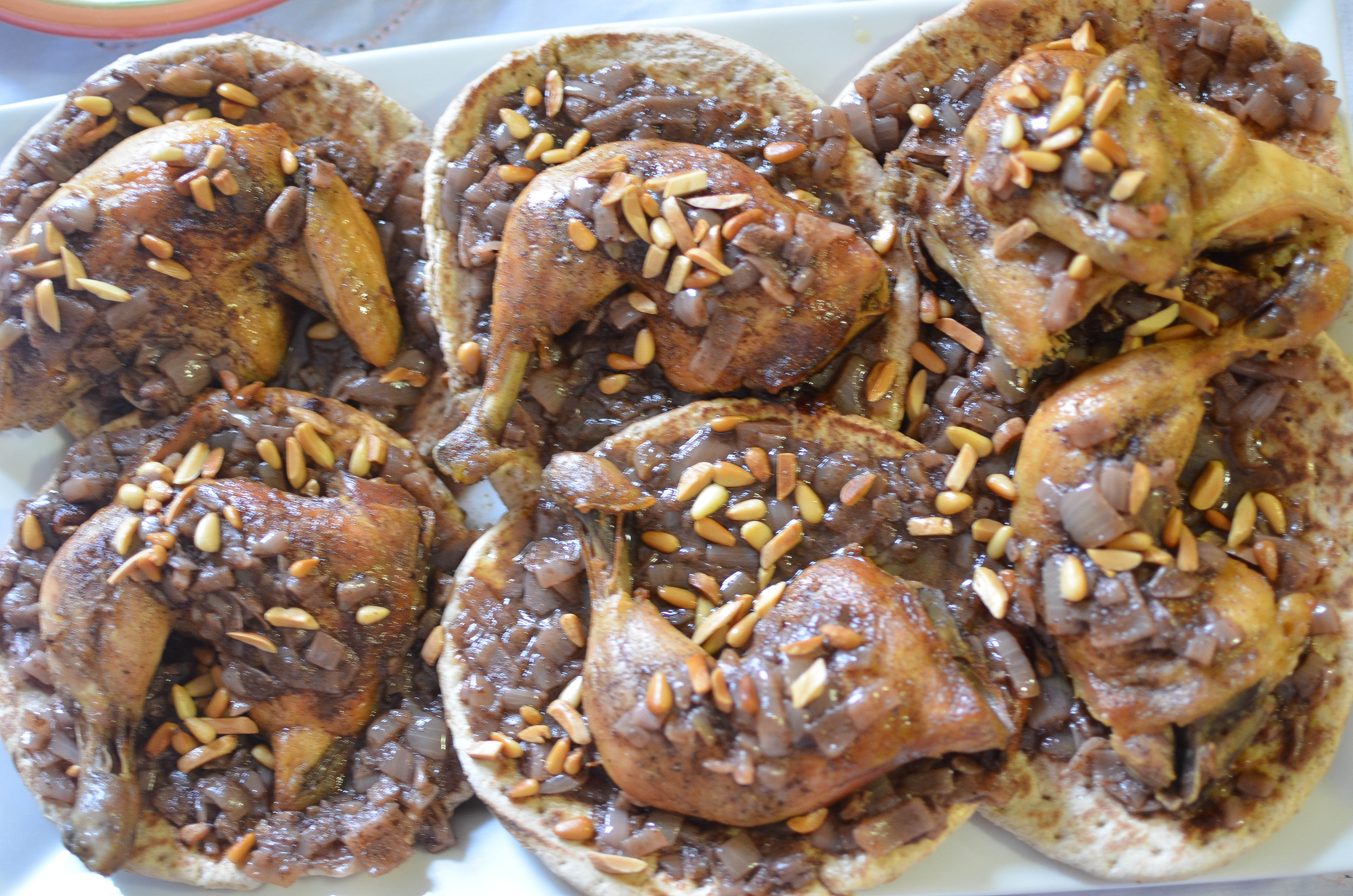
Musakhan: The Palestinian National dish.

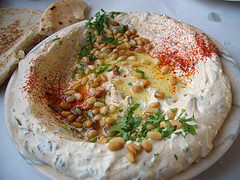
A plate of hummus, garnished with paprika and olive oil and pine nuts

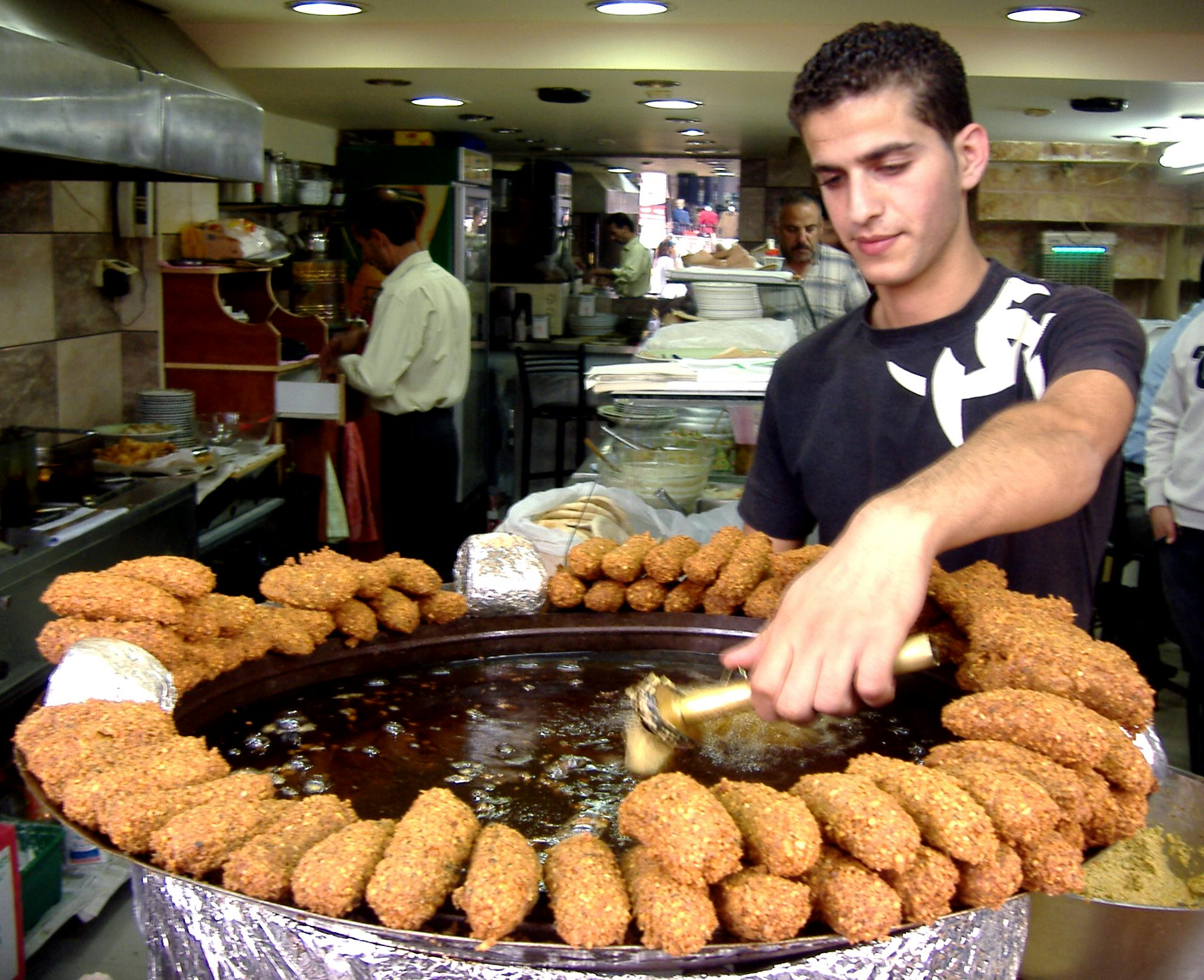
A Palestinian youth serving Falafel in Ramallah.

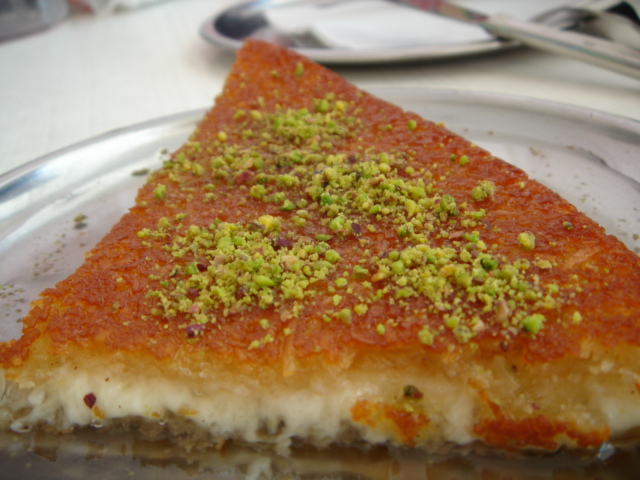
Kanafeh: a Palestinian dessert.

=== Art ===
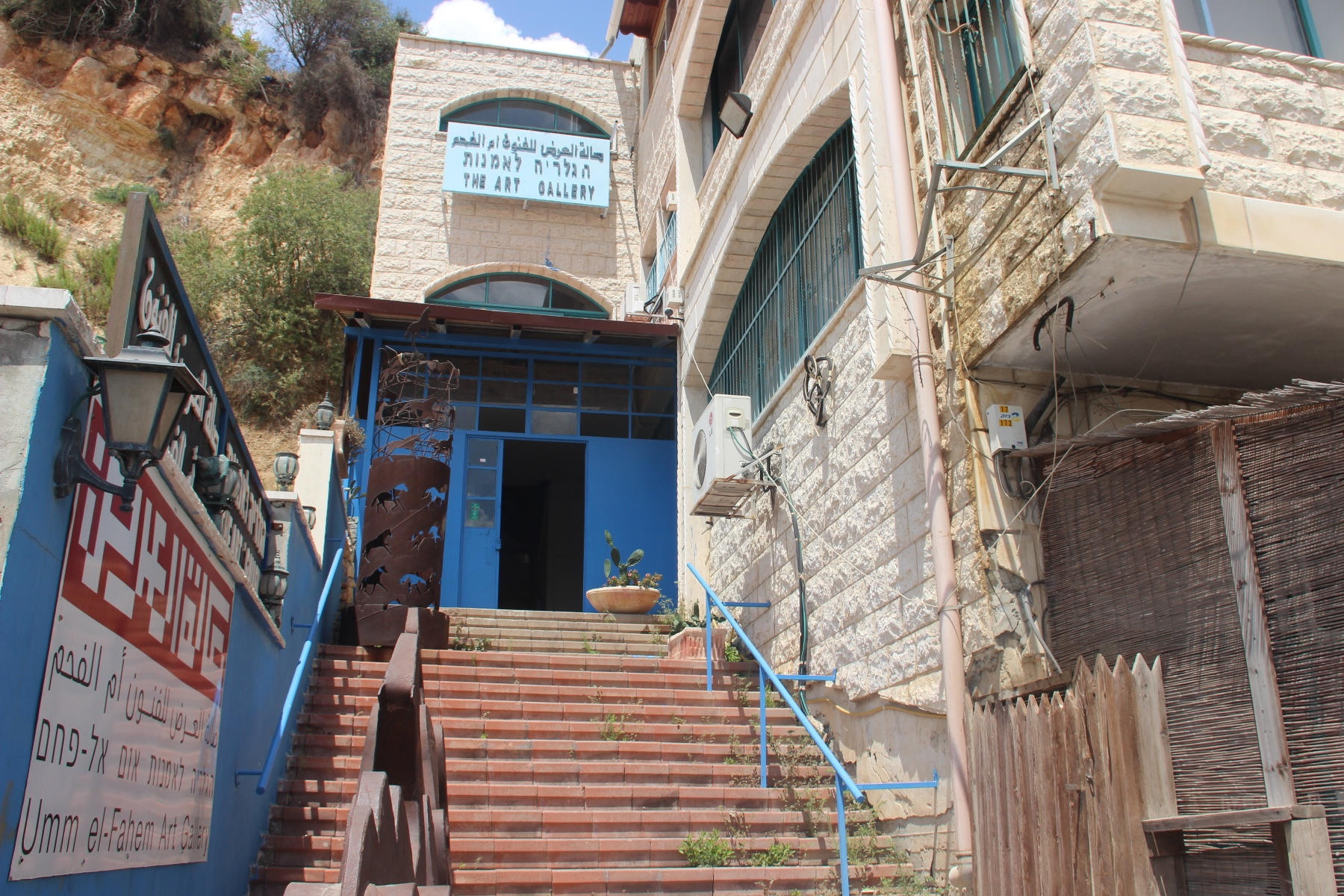
The Umm al-Fahm Art Gallery

Similar to the structure of Palestinian society, the Palestinian field of arts extends over four main geographic centers: the West Bank and Gaza Strip, Israel, the Palestinian diaspora in the Arab world, and the Palestinian diaspora in Europe, the United States and elsewhere.

Cinema

Palestinian cinematography, relatively young compared to Arab cinema overall, receives much European and Israeli support. Palestinian films are not exclusively produced in Arabic; some are made in English, French or Hebrew. More than 800 films have been produced about Palestinians, the Israeli–Palestinian conflict, and other related topics. Examples include Divine Intervention and Paradise Now.

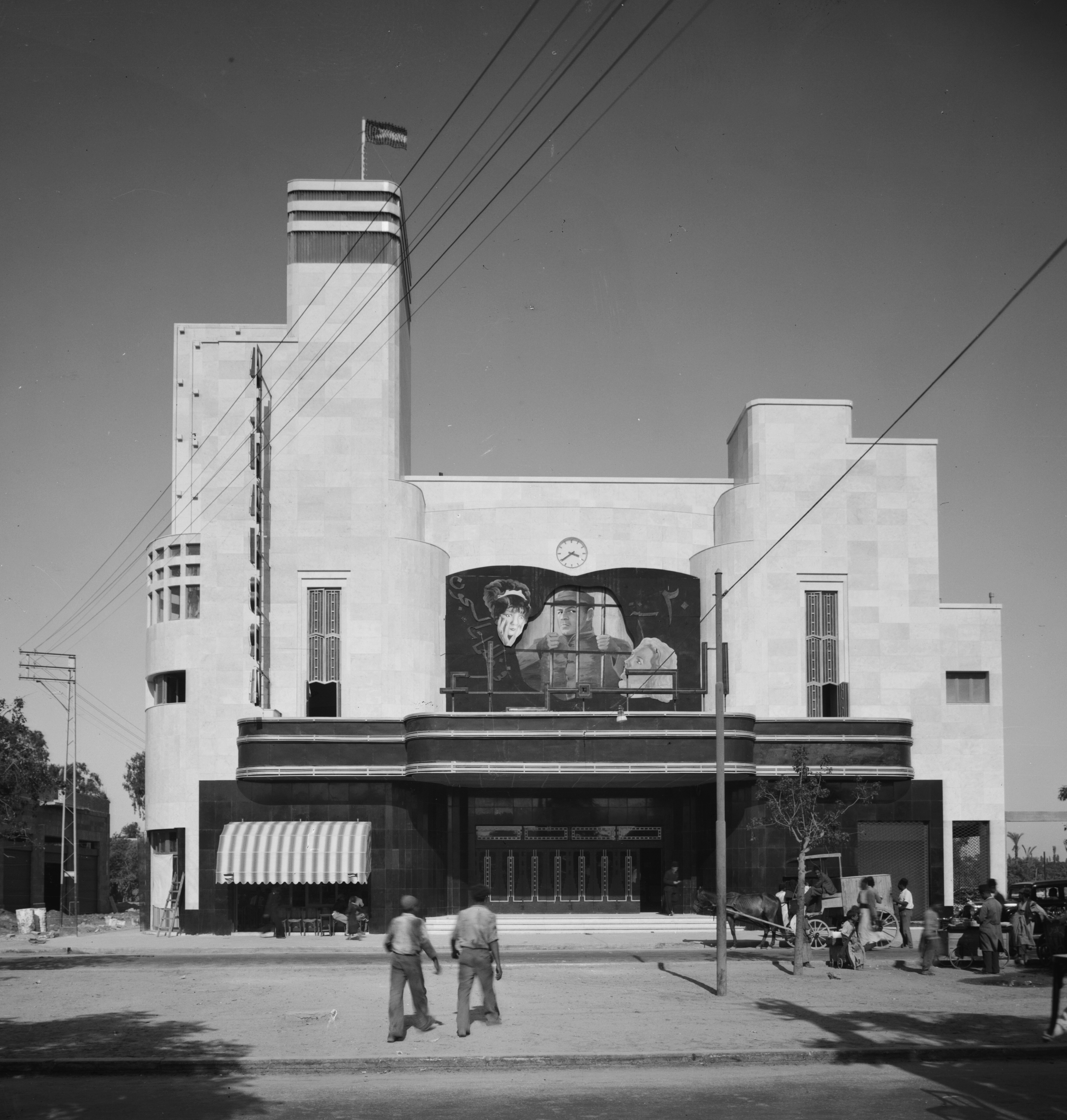
The Alhamra Cinema, Jaffa, 1937, bombed December 1947

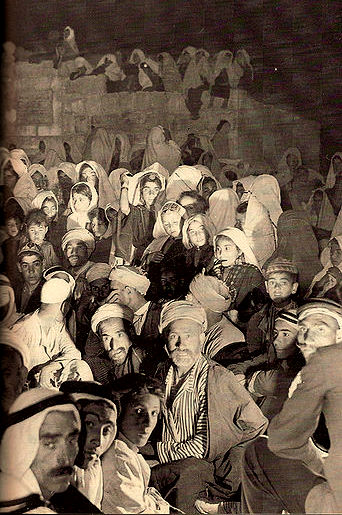
Villagers in Halhul at an open-air cinema screening c. 1940

Handicrafts

A wide variety of handicrafts, many of which have been produced in the area of Palestine for hundreds of years, continue to be produced today. Palestinian handicrafts include embroidery and weaving, pottery-making, soap-making, glass-making, and olive-wood and Mother of Pearl carvings, among others.

Traditional costumes

Foreign travelers to Palestine in the late 19th and early 20th centuries often commented on the rich variety of costumes among the area's inhabitants, and particularly among the fellaheen or village women. Until the 1940s, a woman's economic status, whether married or single, and the town or area they were from could be deciphered by most Palestinian women by the type of cloth, colors, cut, and embroidery motifs, or lack thereof, used for the robe-like dress or "thoub" in Arabic.

New styles began to appear in the 1960s. For example, the "six-branched dress" named after the six wide bands of embroidery running down from the waist. These styles came from the refugee camps, particularly after 1967. Individual village styles were lost and replaced by an identifiable "Palestinian" style. The shawal, a style popular in the West Bank and Jordan before the First Intifada, probably evolved from one of the many welfare embroidery projects in the refugee camps. It was a shorter and narrower fashion, with a western cut.

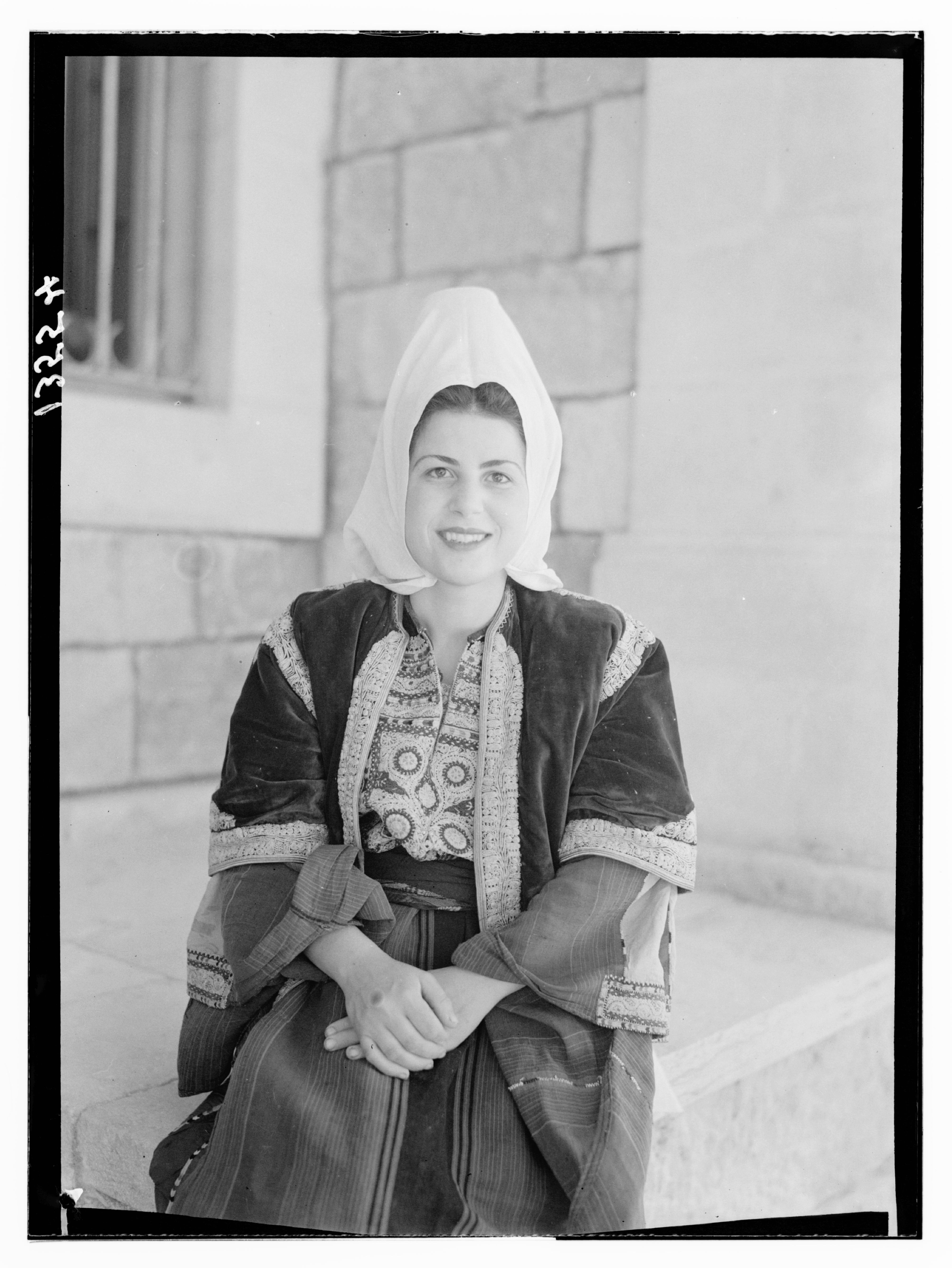
A woman from Bethlehem, c. 1940s.

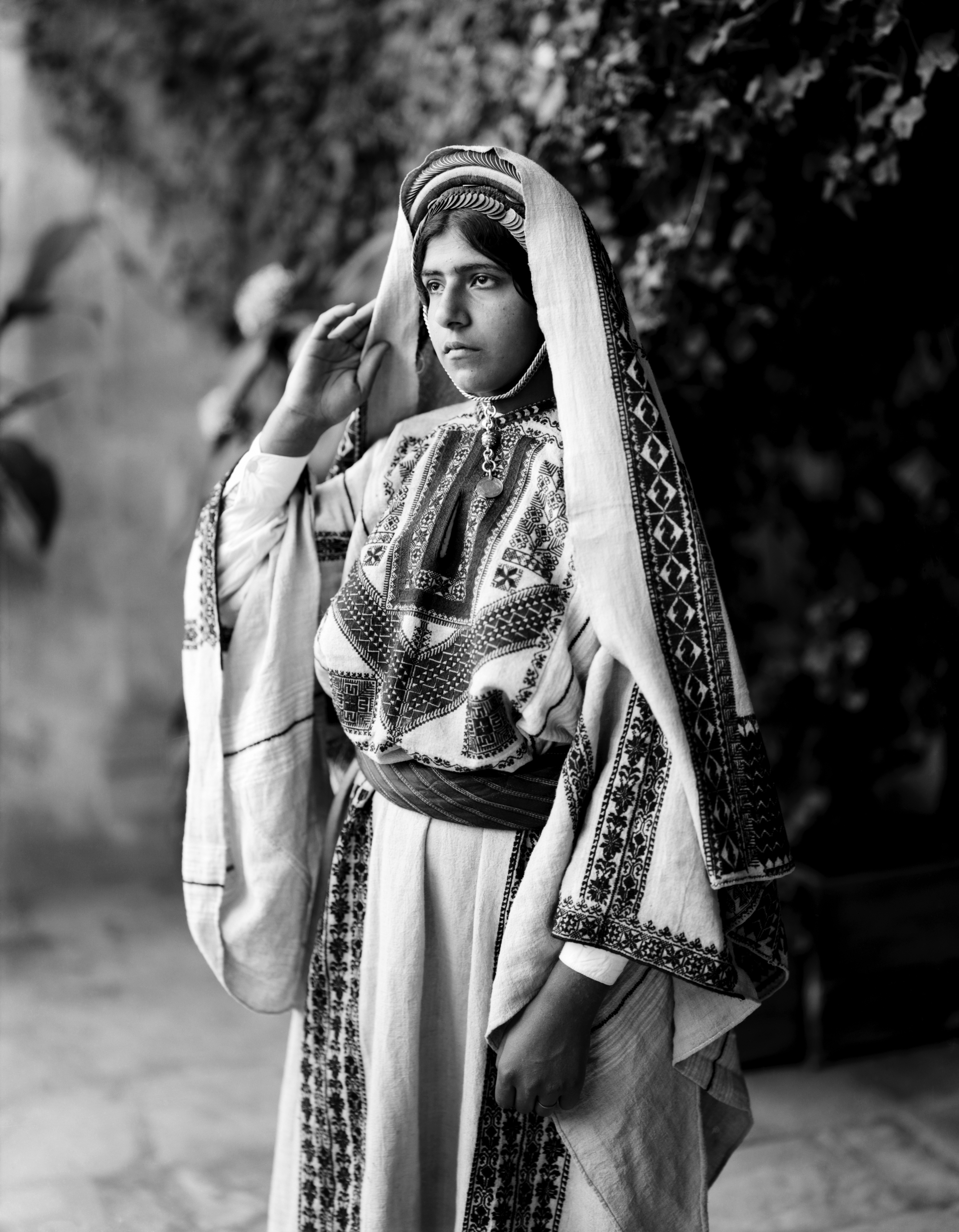
Young woman of Ramallah wearing dowry headdress, c. 1898–1914

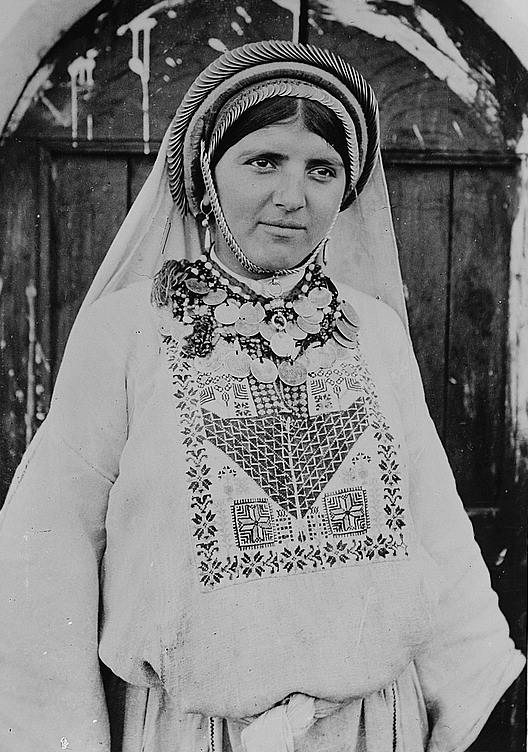
Ramallah woman, c. 1920, Library of Congress

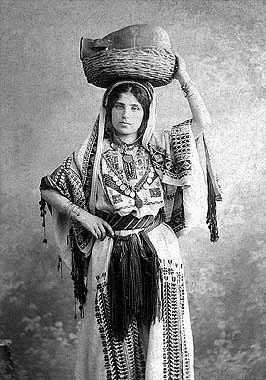
A Traditional Women's Dress in Ramallah, c. 1920.

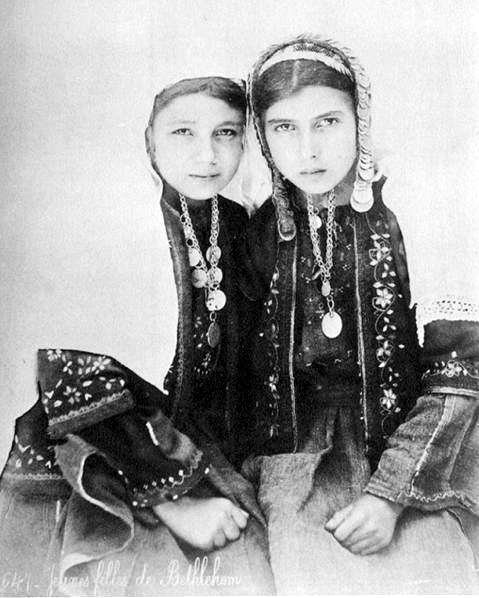
Girls in Bethlehem costume pre-1885.

=== Literature ===
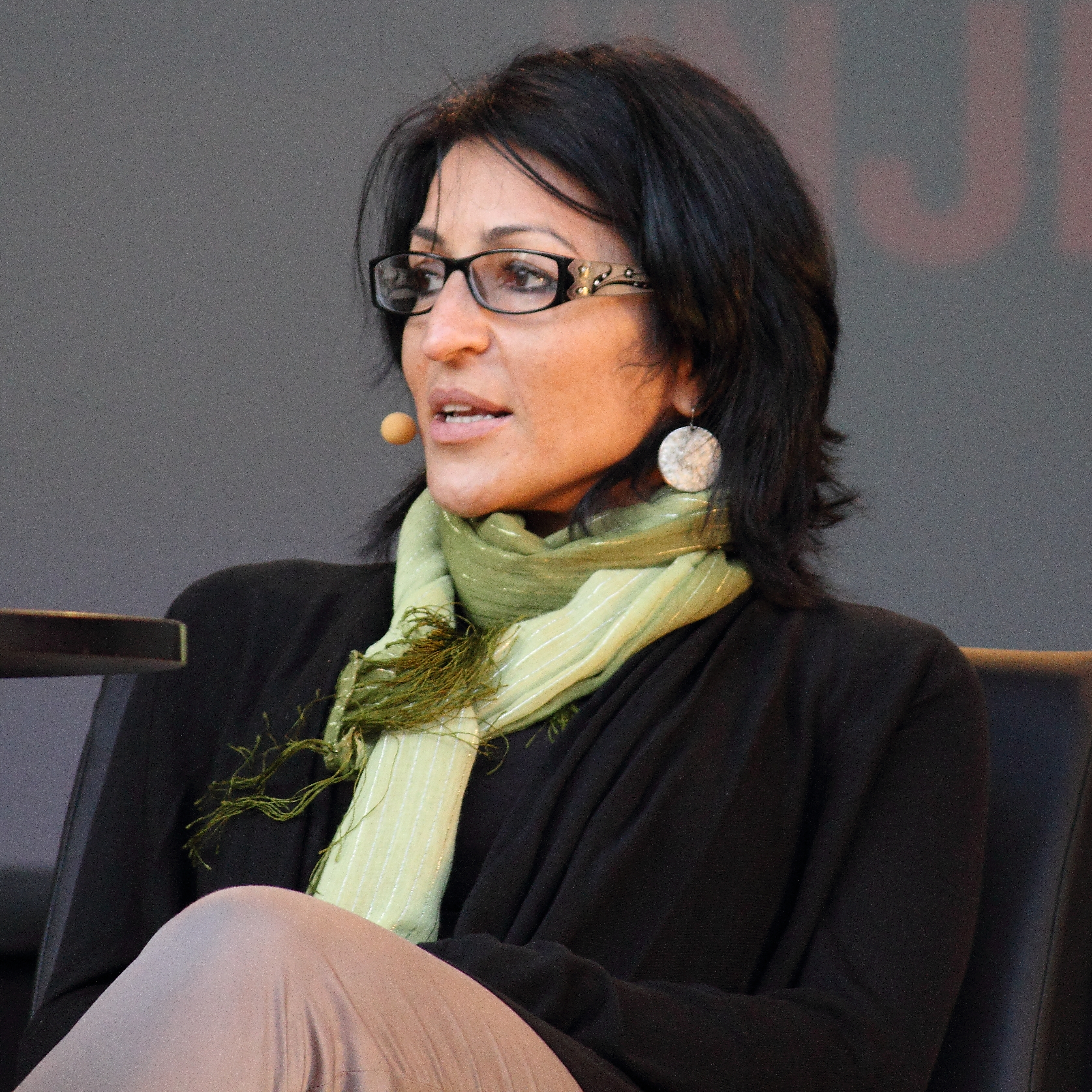
Palestinian novelist and non-fiction writer Susan Abulhawa

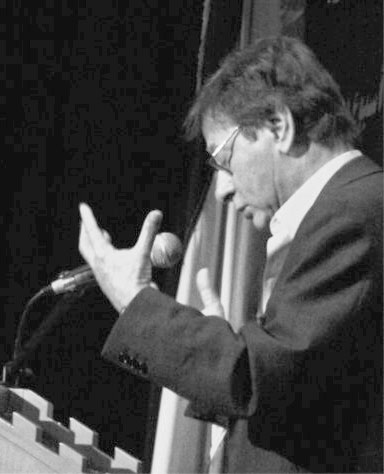
Mahmoud Darwish, Palestinian poet

Palestinian literature forms part of the wider genre of Arabic literature. Unlike its Arabic counterparts, Palestinian literature is defined by national affiliation rather than territorially. For example, Egyptian literature is the literature produced in Egypt. This too was the case for Palestinian literature up to the 1948 Arab-Israeli war, but following the Palestinian Exodus of 1948 it has become "a literature written by Palestinians" regardless of their residential status.

Contemporary Palestinian literature is often characterized by its heightened sense of irony and the exploration of existential themes and issues of identity. References to the subjects of resistance to occupation, exile, loss, and love and longing for homeland are also common. Palestinian literature can be intensely political, as underlined by writers such as Salma Khadra Jayyusi and novelist Liana Badr, who have mentioned the need to give expression to the Palestinian "collective identity" and the "just case" of their struggle. There is also resistance to this school of thought, whereby Palestinian artists have "rebelled" against the demand that their art be "committed". Poet Mourid Barghouti for example, has often said that "poetry is not a civil servant, it's not a soldier, it's in nobody's employ." Rula Jebreal's novel Miral tells the story of Hind al-Husseini's effort to establish an orphanage in Jerusalem after the 1948 Arab–Israeli War, the Deir Yassin massacre, and the establishment of the State of Israel.

Since 1967, most critics have theorized the existence of three "branches" of Palestinian literature, loosely divided by geographic location: 1) from inside Israel, 2) from the occupied territories, 3) from among the Palestinian diaspora throughout the Middle East.

Hannah Amit-Kochavi recognizes only two branches: that written by Palestinians from inside the State of Israel as distinct from that written outside (ibid., p. 11). She also posits a temporal distinction between literature produced before 1948 and that produced thereafter. In a 2003 article published in Studies in the Humanities, Steven Salaita posits a fourth branch made up of English language works, particularly those written by Palestinians in the United States, which he defines as "writing rooted in diasporic countries but focused in theme and content on Palestine."

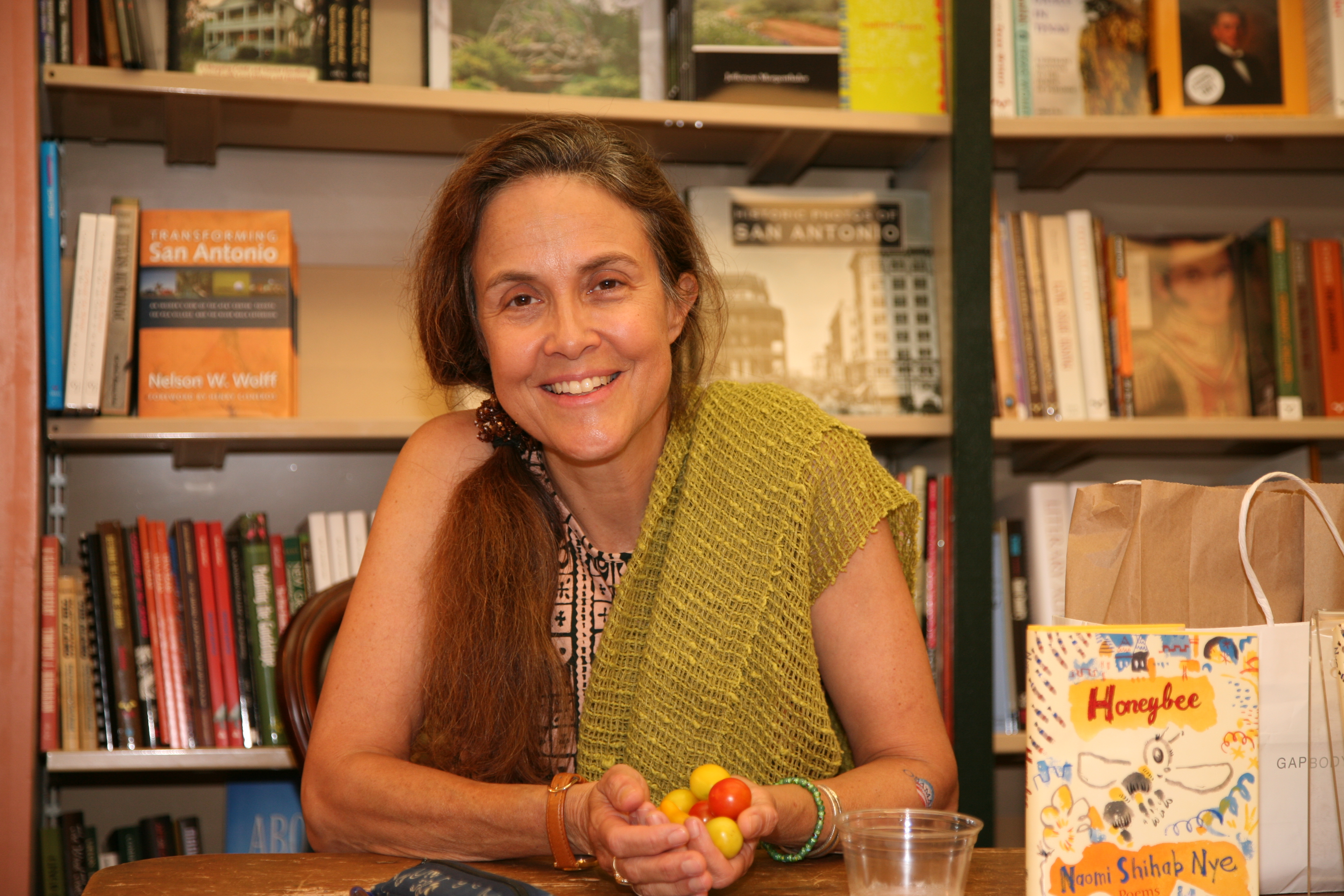
Palestinian-American writer Naomi Shihab Nye

Poetry, using classical pre-Islamic forms, remains an extremely popular art form, often attracting Palestinian audiences in the thousands. Until 20 years ago, local folk bards reciting traditional verses were a feature of every Palestinian town. After the 1948 Palestinian exodus and discrimination by neighboring Arab countries, poetry was transformed into a vehicle for political activism. From among those Palestinians who became Arab citizens of Israel after the passage of the Citizenship Law in 1952, a school of resistance poetry was born that included poets including Mahmoud Darwish, Samih al-Qasim, and Tawfiq Zayyad. The work of these poets was largely unknown to the wider Arab world for years because of the lack of diplomatic relations between Israel and Arab governments. The situation changed after Ghassan Kanafani, another Palestinian writer in exile in Lebanon, published an anthology of their work in 1966. Palestinian poets often write about the common theme of a strong affection and sense of loss and longing for a lost homeland. Among the new generation of Palestinian writers, the work of Nathalie Handal an award-winning poet, playwright, and editor has been widely published in literary journals and magazines and has been translated into twelve languages.

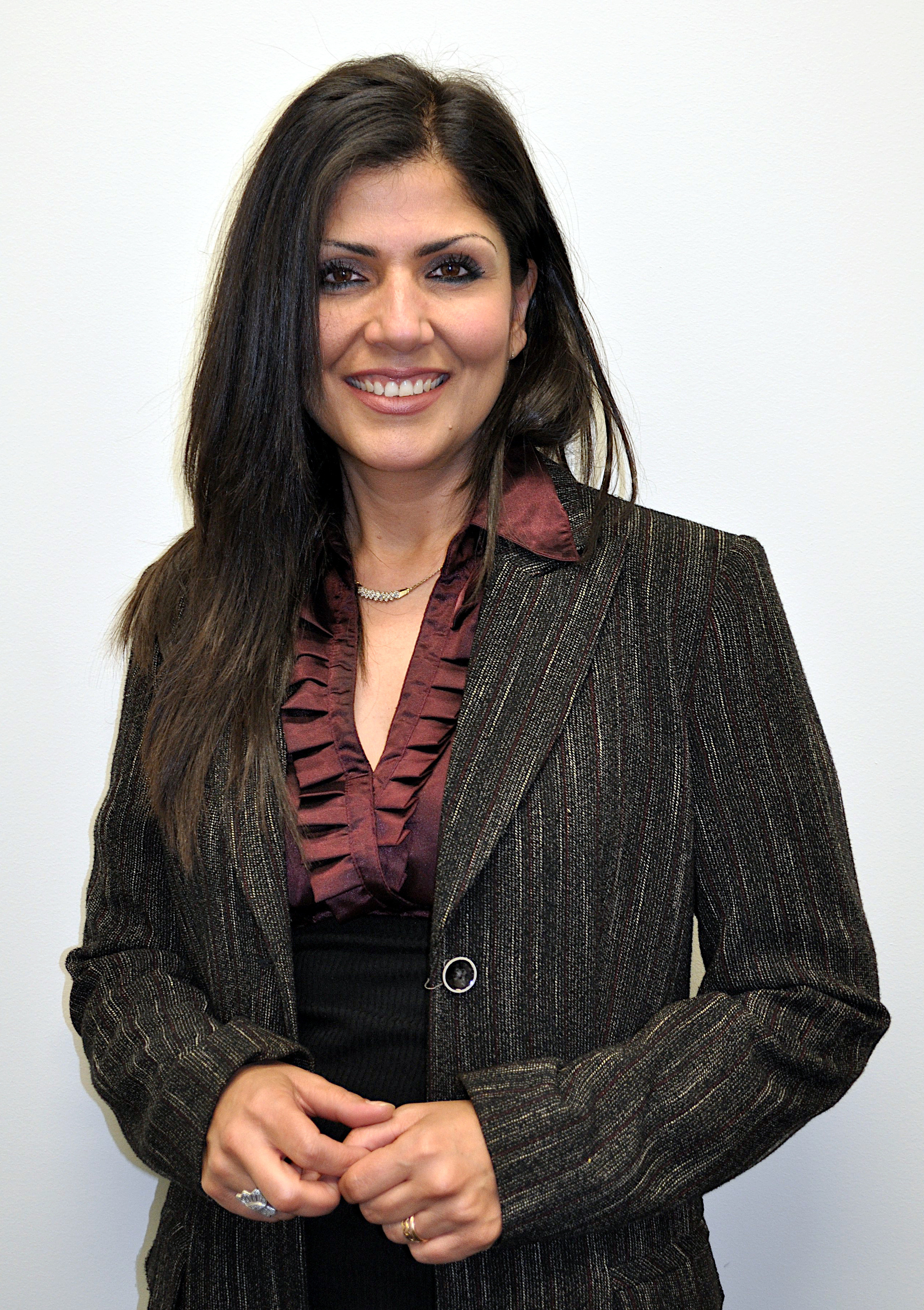
Samah Sabawi is a Palestinian dramatist, writer and journalist.

Palestinian folklore is the body of expressive culture, including tales, music, dance, legends, oral history, proverbs, jokes, popular beliefs, customs, and comprising the traditions (including oral traditions) of Palestinian culture. There was a folklorist revival among Palestinian intellectuals such as Nimr Sirhan, Musa Allush, Salim Mubayyid, and the Palestinian Folklore Society during the 1970s. This group attempted to establish pre-Islamic (and pre-Hebraic) cultural roots for a re-constructed Palestinian national identity. The two putative roots in this patrimony are Canaanite and Jebusite. Such efforts seem to have borne fruit as evidenced in the organization of celebrations including the Qabatiya Canaanite festival and the annual Music Festival of Yabus by the Palestinian Ministry of Culture.

Traditional storytelling among Palestinians is prefaced with an invitation to the listeners to give blessings to God and the Prophet Mohammed or the Virgin Mary as the case may be, and includes the traditional opening: "There was, or there was not, in the oldness of time..." Formulaic elements of the stories share much in common with the wider Arab world, though the rhyming scheme is distinct. There are a cast of supernatural characters: djinns who can cross the Seven Seas in an instant, giants, and ghouls with eyes of ember and teeth of brass. Stories invariably have a happy ending, and the storyteller will usually finish off with a rhyme like: "The bird has taken flight, God bless you tonight", or "Tutu, tutu, finished is my haduttu (story)."

=== Music ===
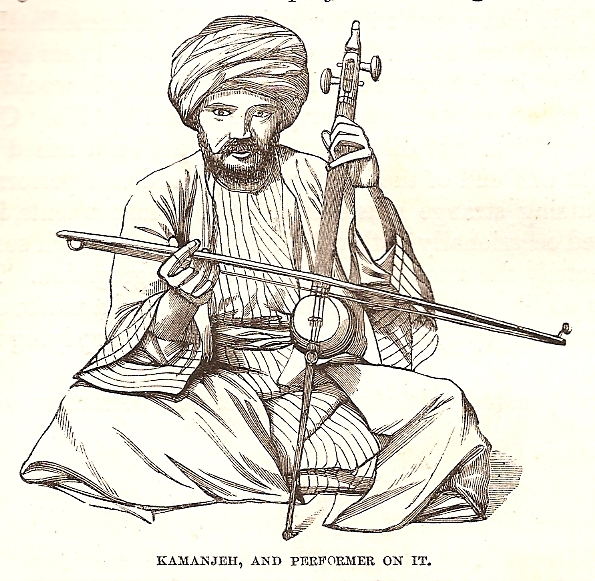
Kamanjeh performer in Jerusalem, 1859

Palestinian music is well known throughout the Arab world. After 1948, a new wave of performers emerged with distinctively Palestinian themes relating to dreams of statehood and burgeoning nationalist sentiments. In addition to zajal and ataaba, traditional Palestinian songs include: Bein Al-dawai, Al-Rozana, Zarif – Al-Toul, and Al-Maijana, Dal'ona, Sahja/Saamir, Zaghareet. Over three decades, the Palestinian National Music and Dance Troupe (El Funoun) and Mohsen Subhi have reinterpreted and rearranged traditional wedding songs such as Mish'al (1986), Marj Ibn 'Amer(1989) and Zaghareed (1997). Ataaba is a form of folk singing that consists of four verses, following a specific form and meter. The distinguishing feature of ataaba is that the first three verses end with the same word meaning three different things, and the fourth verse serves as a conclusion. It is usually followed by a dalouna.

Reem Kelani is one of the foremost researchers and performers in the present day of music with a specifically Palestinian narrative and heritage. Her 2006 debut solo album Sprinting Gazelle – Palestinian Songs from the Motherland and the Diaspora comprised Kelani's research and an arrangement of five traditional Palestinian songs, whilst the other five songs were her own musical settings of popular and resistance poetry by the likes of Mahmoud Darwish, Salma Khadra Jayyusi, Rashid Husain and Mahmoud Salim al-Hout. All the songs on the album relate to 'pre-1948 Palestine'.

==== Palestinian hip hop ====
Palestinian hip hop reportedly started in 1998 with Tamer Nafar's group DAM. These Palestinian youth forged the new Palestinian musical subgenre, which blends Arabic melodies and hip hop beats. Lyrics are often sung in Arabic, Hebrew, English, and sometimes French. Since then, the new Palestinian musical subgenre has grown to include artists in the Palestinian territories, Israel, Great Britain, the United States and Canada.

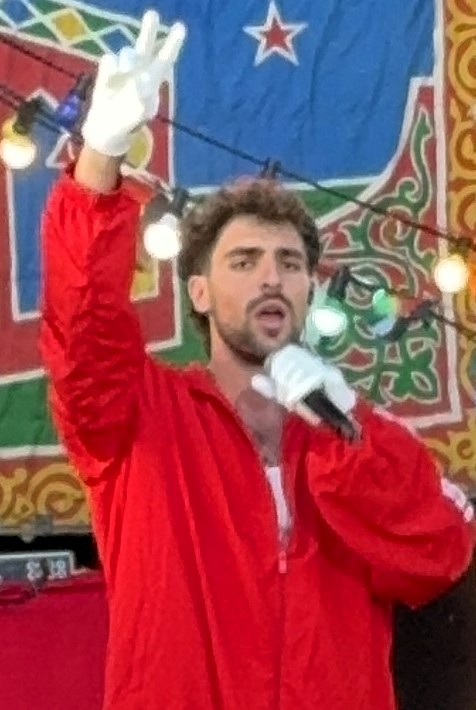
Saint Levant is a Palestinian singer-songwriter and rapper

Borrowing from traditional rap music that first emerged in New York in the 1970s, "young Palestinian musicians have tailored the style to express their own grievances with the social and political climate in which they live and work." Palestinian hip hop works to challenge stereotypes and instigate dialogue about the Israeli–Palestinian conflict. Palestinian hip-hop artists have been strongly influenced by the messages of American rappers. Tamar Nafar says, "When I heard Tupac sing 'It's a White Man's World' I decided to take hip hop seriously". In addition to the influences from American hip hop, it also includes musical elements from Palestinian and Arabic music including "zajal, mawwal, and saj" which can be likened to Arabic spoken word, as well as including the percussiveness and lyricism of Arabic music.

Historically, music has served as an integral accompaniment to various social and religious rituals and ceremonies in Palestinian society (Al-Taee 47). Much of the Middle-Eastern and Arabic string instruments utilized in classical Palestinian music are sampled over Hip-hop beats in both Israeli and Palestinian hip-hop as part of a joint process of localization. Just as the percussiveness of the Hebrew language is emphasized in Israeli Hip-hop, Palestinian music has always revolved around the rhythmic specificity and smooth melodic tone of Arabic. "Musically speaking, Palestinian songs are usually pure melody performed monophonically with complex vocal ornamentations and strong percussive rhythm beats". The presence of a hand-drum in classical Palestinian music indicates a cultural esthetic conducive to the vocal, verbal and instrumental percussion which serve as the foundational elements of Hip-hop. This hip hop is joining a "longer tradition of revolutionary, underground, Arabic music and political songs that have supported Palestinian Resistance". This subgenre has served as a way to politicize the Palestinian issue through music.

==== Dance ====
The Dabke, a Levantine Arab folk dance style whose local Palestinian versions were appropriated by Palestinian nationalism after 1967, has, according to one scholar, possible roots that may go back to ancient Canaanite fertility rites. It is marked by synchronized jumping, stamping, and movement, similar to tap dancing. One version is performed by men, another by women.

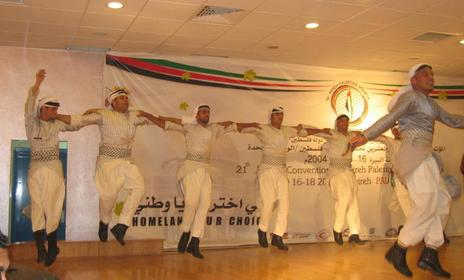
Palestinian Dabke folk dance being performed by men

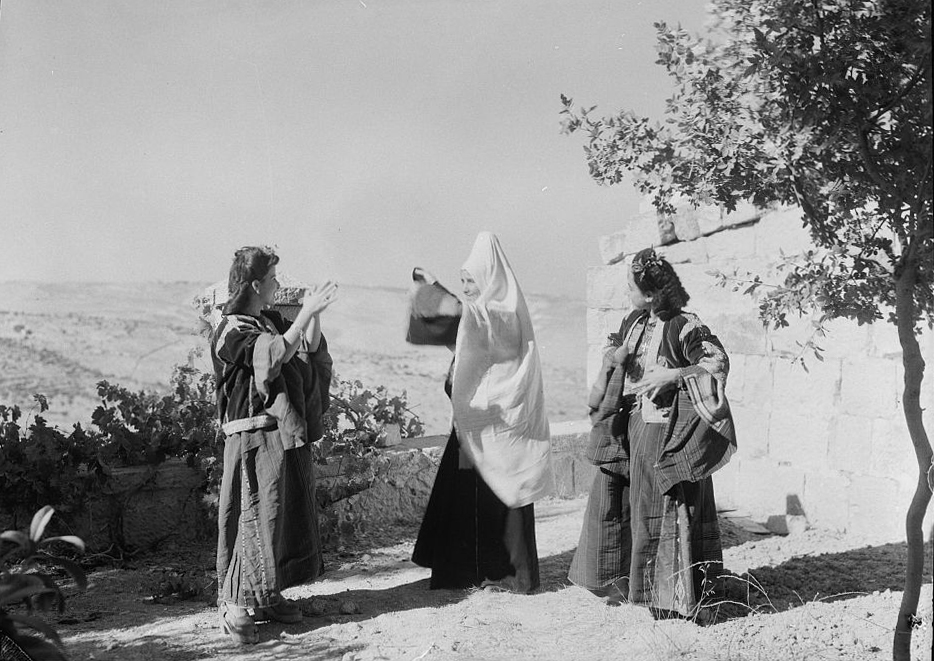
Palestinian women dancing traditionally, Bethlehem c. 1936

=== Sport ===
Although sport facilities did exist before the 1948 Palestinian expulsion and flight, many such facilities and institutions were subsequently shut down. Today there remains sport centers such as in Gaza and Ramallah, but the difficulty of mobility and travel restrictions means most Palestinian are not able to compete internationally to their full potential. However, Palestinian sport authorities have indicated that Palestinians in the diaspora will be eligible to compete for Palestine once the diplomatic and security situation improves.

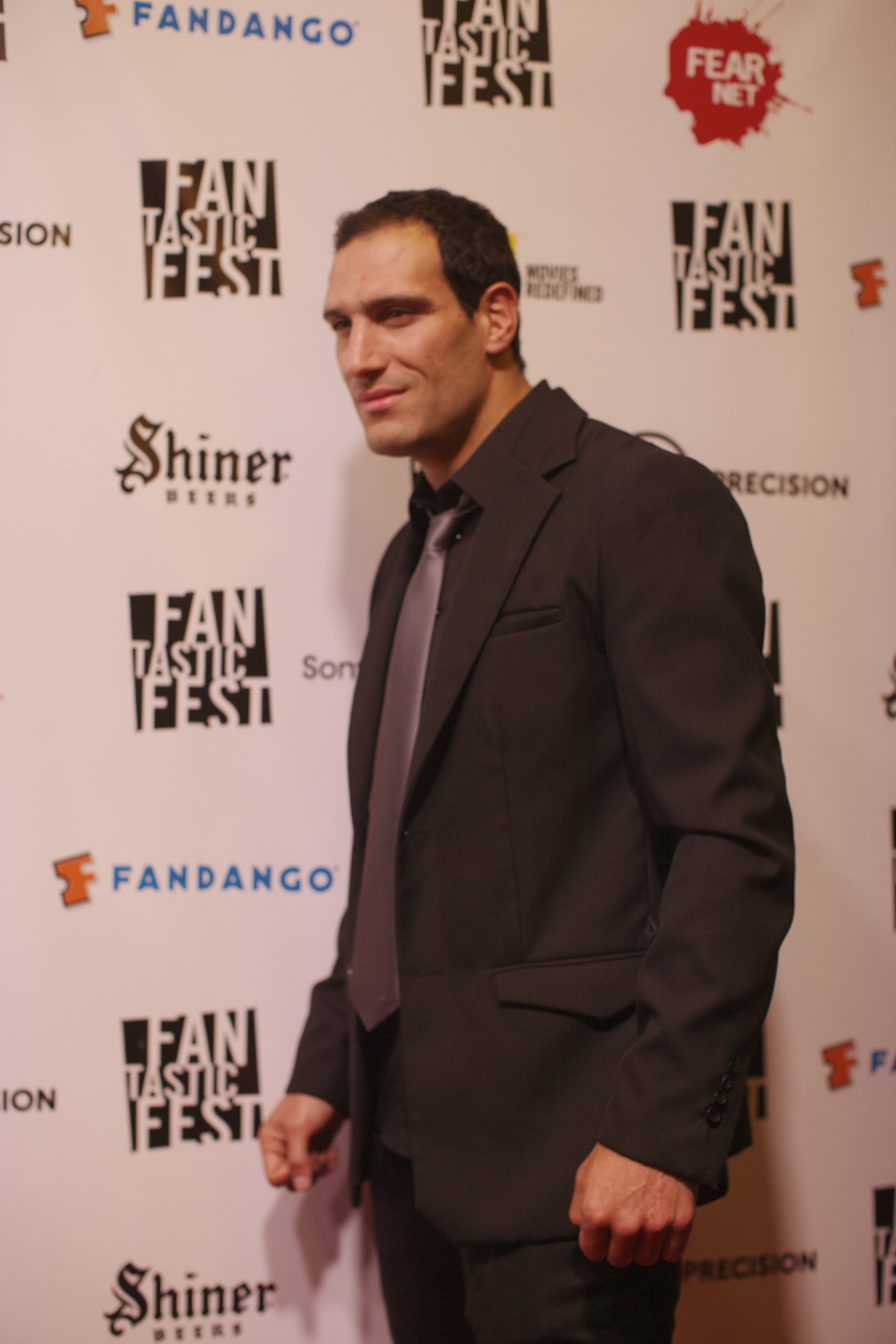
Marko Zaror, Chilean martial artist of Palestinian descent.

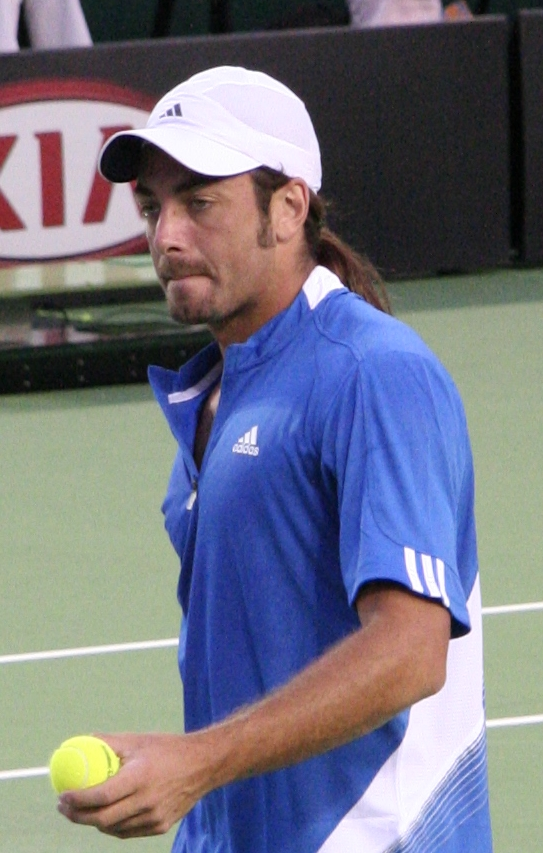
Nicolás Massú, Chilean tennis player of Palestinian descent.

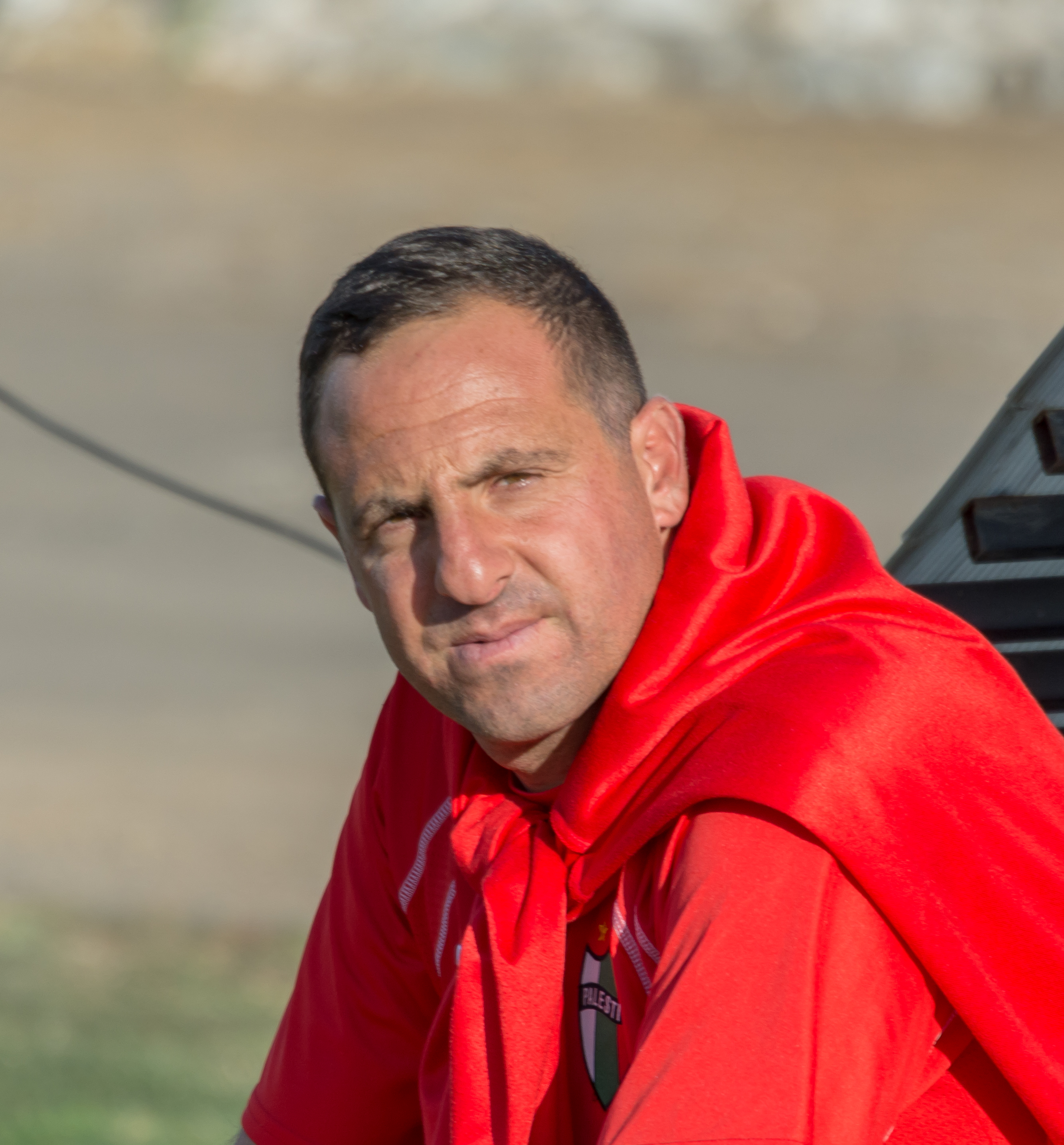
Roberto Bishara is a footballer of Palestinian descent.

== See also ==
- List of Palestinians
- History of agriculture in Palestine
- Muhareb Theeb
