= Steadfastness and Confrontation Front =

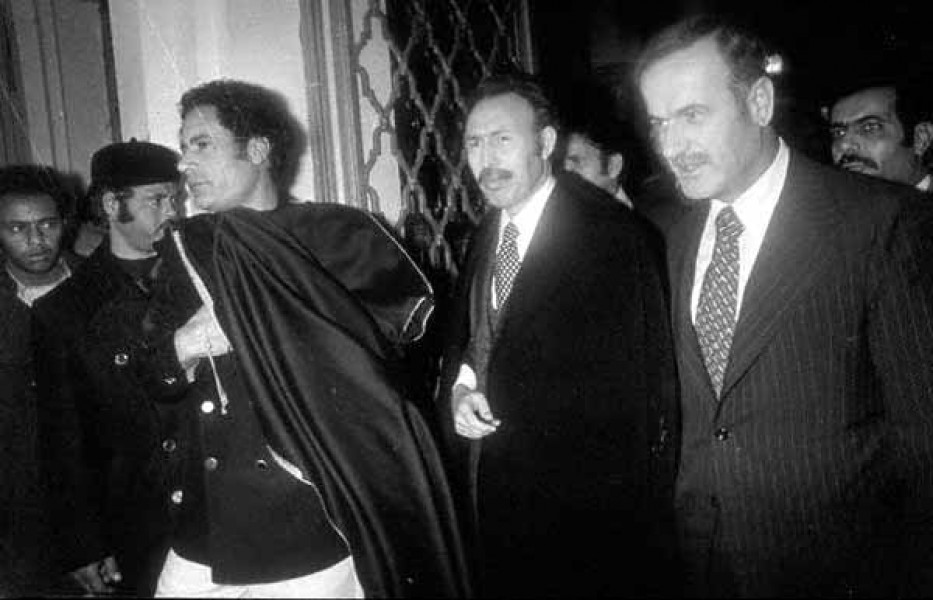
Right to left: Syrian president Assad, Algerian president Boumedienne and Libyan leader Gaddafi at the Front summit in Tripoli, December 1977

The Steadfastness and Confrontation Front (Arabic: جبهة الصمود والتصدي) was a political initiative of 4 December 1977 by the Palestine Liberation Organization (PLO) and the governments of Libya, Algeria, Syria and South Yemen following the visit by Egyptian President Anwar Sadat to Israel on 19 November 1977, which was widely seen in the Arab world as an abandonment of the previously-agreed principle of withholding recognition of Israel and as breaking the Arab alliance against Israel.

== Background ==
The Steadfastness and Confrontation Front was formed in 1977 by the Palestine Liberation Organization (PLO) and the governments of Libya, Algeria, Syria and South Yemen. It was intended as a protest and a show of position after President Anwar Sadat of Egypt had travelled to Tel Aviv to meet Israeli Prime Minister Menachem Begin and begin the peace negotiations that would eventually lead to the Camp David Accords. This Egyptian initiative was widely seen in the Arab world as an abandonment of the previously-agreed principle of withholding recognition of Israel and as breaking the Arab alliance against Israel.

== Purpose ==
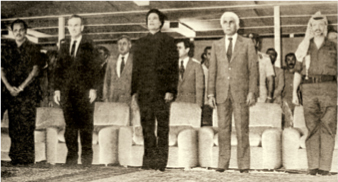
Leaders of the Front meeting. From left to right: Ali Nasir Muhammad (South Yemen), Hafez al-Assad (Syria), Muammar Gaddafi (Libya), Chadli Bendjedid (Algeria) and Yasser Arafat (Palestine Liberation Organization)

The Front affirmed its rejection of United Nations Security Council resolutions 242 and 338 and reiterated the unwillingness to recognize Israel or negotiate with it as regards a Palestinian state. It also condemned every Arab government who did not join the Front, called for a boycott of Egypt, and emphasized the ties between Syria and the Palestinians.

The Front did not explicitly call for Israel's destruction, but repeated the PLO's Ten Point Program calling for a Palestinian state on "any part of Palestinian land ... as an interim aim of the Palestinian Revolution". This had been interpreted, at least inside the PLO, as a step towards a two-state solution and was highly controversial among Palestinians.

== Palestinian and Arab response ==
The Front should not be confused with the Rejectionist Front, which had been formed in 1974 and comprised hard-line radical Palestinian factions that had left the PLO after the Palestinian National Council adopted the PLO's Ten Point Program. The Front and its conflict with Egypt assisted in healing the rift between the PLO and those supporting the Rejectionist Front.

== Boycott of Egypt ==
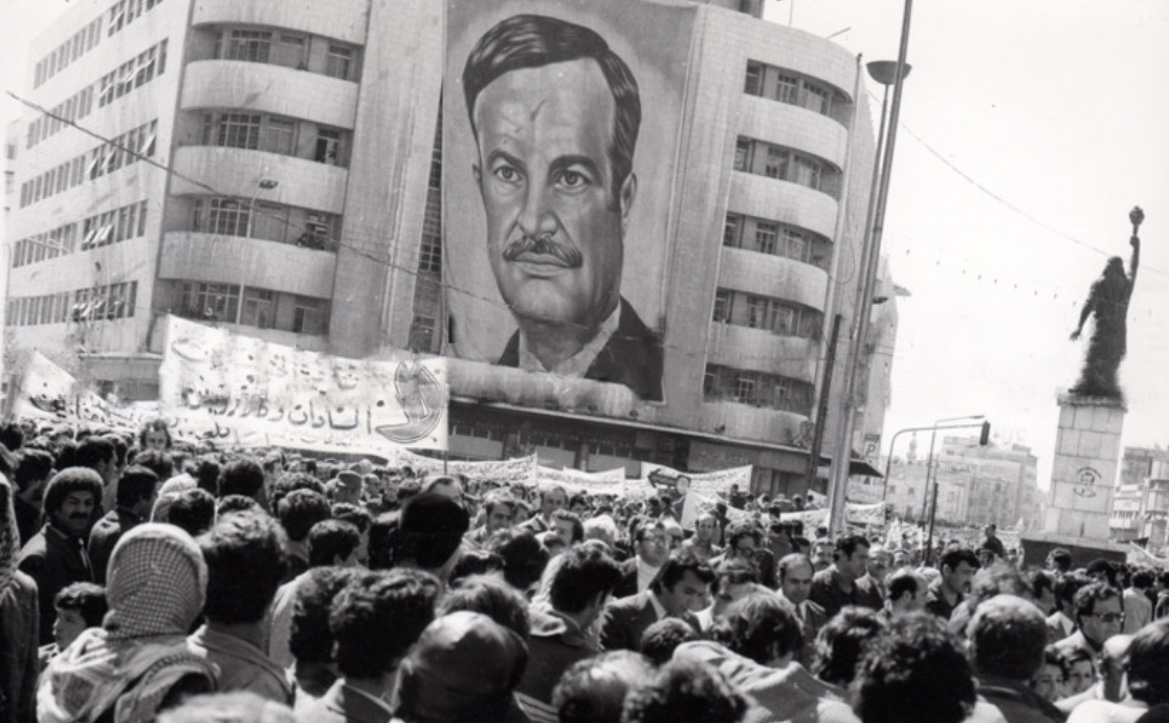
Anti-Egyptian demonstration in Damascus, 1978.

In 1977, the demand by Front members for sanctions to be imposed on Egypt was rejected by a majority of Arab countries.

Following the Camp David conference in November 1978, however, at a summit meeting in Baghdad, a consensus of Arab states agreed to impose political and economic sanctions on Egypt. The position was a compromise, rejecting the strong sanctions advocated by the radical factions, in favour of the more moderate measures involving a condemnation of Egypt. Egypt was suspended from the Arab League in 1979, and its headquarters was moved from Cairo. Diplomatic relations with Egypt were severed by the Arab states.

From 1981 to 1983 Egyptians and other Arabs continued to level harsh criticism and express outrage over Sadat's policies. In the mid-1980s anger toward Sadat began to dissipate and Jordan restored relations with Egypt. Following that restoration, an Arab summit, held in Amman in mid-1987, led the other Arab states to restore relations with Egypt over the following two years. Then, in 1989, Jordan, Yemen, Iraq and Egypt formed the Arab Cooperation Council (ACC), Egypt regained its membership in the Arab League, and the League's headquarters returned to Cairo.

== See also ==
- Arab nationalism
- Camp David Accords
