= Palast =

Palast means palace in German and may refer to

- Palast (surname)
- Palast Orchester, a German orchestra based in Berlin
- Palestine Academy for Science and Technology, an academy in Palestine
- König Palast (Kings Palace), an arena in Krefeld, Germany
- Friedrichstadt-Palast, a revue in the Berlin district, Germany
- Ufa-Palast am Zoo, a former major cinema in Berlin
