= Qudwa =

Al-Qudwa القدوة
- Hussenid Arab tribe
- Nisba: Al-Qudwa; Al-Husseini (Al-Husayni)
- Location: Mainly Gaza
- Descended from: Yusef al-Qudwa
- Branches: Banū Mohammad; Banū Arafat
- Religion: Sunni Islam

Al-Qudwa, also spelled, al-Qudwah, Kudwah, Qidwa, (Arabic: القدوة) is a famous family of notables in the city of Gaza in the State of Palestine of the Ashraf class (الأشراف) . The family is also known as Arafat (Arabic: عرفات), Arafat al-Qudwa or Arafat al-Qudwa al-Husseini .

== Prominent members ==
- Yasser Arafat, His full name is Mohammad Yasser Abdul Raouf Dawoud Arafat al-Qudwa al-Hussieni, President of Palestinian National Authority, Chairman of PLO, and Laureate of the Nobel Prize
- Fathi Arafat, founder and chairman of the Palestine Red Crescent Society, and member of the Palestinian National Council.
- Moussa Arafat, head of the Palestinian Public Security Service in the Gaza Strip.
- Muhammad al-Qudwa, governor of the Gaza Governorate (1996–2014)
- Nasser al-Qudwa, former Foreign Affairs Minister of the Palestinian National Authority, UN special envoy to Syria.
