= PRCS =

PRCS may refer to:

- Powell River Christian school
- Pasir Ris Crest Secondary
- President, Royal College of Surgeons
- Primary Reaction Control System (NASA Orbiter Shuttle Program)
- Palestine Red Crescent Society
