= Rejectionist Front =

1974–1990s Palestinian coalition that rejected the PLO's Ten Point Program

The Rejectionist Front (Arabic: جبهة الرفض) or Front of the Palestinian Forces Rejecting Solutions of Surrender (جبهة القوى الفلسطينية الرافضة للحلول الإستسلامية) was a political coalition formed in 1974 by radical Palestinian factions who rejected the Ten Point Program adopted by the Palestine Liberation Organization (PLO) in its 12th Palestinian National Congress (PNC) session.

== Origins ==
While affirming the PLO's commitment to fight Israel, the Fatah-sponsored Ten Point Program authorized the PLO to "establish [an] independent combatant national authority for the people over every part of Palestinian territory that is liberated", which was regarded by many Palestinians as a possible first step towards a two-state proposal. At the same PNC session, the ultimate goal of the PLO was defined as recovering the Palestinian right of return and right of self-determination "on the whole of the soil of their homeland".

This prompted several of the more militant Palestinian factions to leave the PLO in protest and form the Rejectionist Front. They were mostly far-left organizations fearing a Palestinian-Israeli rapprochement. The Front was never an operative organization, but rather a statement of position. It was strongly backed by Iraq.

While the involved factions continued to advocate a hard-line policy towards Israel, most of them eventually rejoined the PLO, for example in 1977, when the Steadfastness and Confrontation Front was announced. But tensions remained, and the Rejectionist Front or similar initiatives were revived virtually every time Arafat made a conciliatory gesture towards Israel. The most serious rift was in 1988, when the PLO recognized Israel, and most of the left wing of the PLO again left, backed by Syria.

== Consequences ==
Though the rift initially caused a popular breakthrough for the members of the Rejectionist Front, in the long run it only marginalized them and caused them to be perceived as lackeys of the Arab states. The fact that it was more of an alignment against Yasser Arafat rather than for anything in particular didn't help, as the Front brought "together" factions that had no common goal. This can be seen by the example of as-Saiqa, a movement that forms the branch of the pro-Syrian Ba'ath Party in the Palestinian territories, and the Arab Liberation Front, similar however used by the pro-Iraqi Ba'ath Party. The alliance did nothing to improve cooperation between member factions, and internecine bloodshed continued.

The Front also failed in its goal of weakening Arafat; the PLO Chairman remained securely at the helm of the organization and consolidated a massive war arsenal and order of battle in southern Lebanon in order to harass the Israelis. The Ten-Point Program increased Arafat's worth on the diplomatic front as more western states became willing to speak with his representatives. The members of the Front, contrastingly, isolated themselves as extremists and subservient to the Arab states that backed them and even to the USSR.

In 1975 the Lebanese Civil War broke out. Far bloodier than its 1950s prelude, it featured most PLO factions on the side of the Lebanese National Movement, specially with the mainly Sunni al-Murabitun. The right-wing Lebanese Front had long seen the PLO as a threat to their supremacy in Lebanon's volatile sectarian balance. The Lebanese National Movement and PLO were seen too as a threat to Syria, as they opposed Syrian strategy. As a result, the Rejectionist Front itself became split between the PFLP and various smaller groups which sided with the LNM and Fatah, and as-Saiqa and the PFLP-General Command which sided with Syria.

Throughout the late 1970s and then the 1980s the Lebanese wars decimated the ranks of some of the pro-Syrian groups, especially those who supported the Syrians in the War of the Camps. During that war, where the Front was joined by dissidents from within Fatah (Fatah al-Intifada) led by Col. Said al-Muragha, many of them assaulted refugee camps leading to civilian casualties and accusations that they were turncoats concerned only with serving Assad's goals. The PFLP-GC, for example, which was commanded by the professional guerrilla Ahmed Jibril, wasted much of its efforts on fighting Arafat instead of attacking the Israelis in southern Lebanon, or in recruiting a local infrastructure in the West Bank or Gaza Strip. In addition, most of these groups became extremely dependent on the Syrian government financially and for military supplies. It may be that the PFLP and DFLP's neutrality in the War of the Camps saved them from the mediocre fate that led to the irrelevancy held by the PFLP-General Command to this day.

== Decline and demise ==
The Front also showed obvious divisions in respect to the First Intifada (1987–91), as well as the Persian Gulf War (1991). In 1991, Palestinian Popular Struggle Front was allowed to rejoin the PLO after accepting United Nations Security Council Resolution 242 and the concept of negotiations with Israel. The Abu Nidal Organization faded continuously into the shadows after 1991, as-Saiqa never grew out of its comfortable niche in the arms of Assad, the ALF did the same under the sponsorship of Saddam Hussein, the DFLP divided in two on the question of the Oslo Accords (1993), while the PFLP began an ambivalent participation in the peace process that never resulted in complete rejection or acceptance.

Today, the Rejectionist Front as a whole is overshadowed by the hard-line Islamist groups Hamas and Palestinian Islamic Jihad, and the Popular Resistance Committees, as well as hard-line affiliates of the PLFP and Fatah such as the Abu Ali Mustapha Brigades and the Al-Aqsa Martyrs' Brigades, respectively. Most of the organizations that once belonged to the Front today only have dozens of members.

== Members of the Rejectionist Front ==
This is a list of organizations who participated in the Rejectionist Front in 1976:

- Arab Liberation Front (ALF)
- Palestinian Popular Struggle Front (PPSF)
- Popular Front for the Liberation of Palestine (PFLP)
- Popular Front for the Liberation of Palestine – General Command (PFLP-GC)

== See also ==
- Political Programme of the 12th Palestinian National Council

== Bibliography ==
- Rex Brynen, Sanctuary and Survival: the PLO in Lebanon, Boulder: Westview Press, Oxford 1990. ISBN 0 86187 123 5 – Sanctuary and Survival: The PLO in Lebanon
