= Palestine Red Crescent Society =

Humanitarian organization in Palestine

Palestine Red Crescent Society جمعية الهلال الأحمر الفلسطيني
- Founded: 1968; 58 years ago
- Founder: Fathi Arafat
- Type: Non-profit
- Headquarters: Al-Bireh, State of Palestine
- Region served: State of Palestine, including both Palestinian territories: the West Bank, including East Jerusalem, and the Gaza Strip
- President: Dr. Younis al-Khatib
- Affiliations: IFM – SEI
- Staff: 4,200
- Volunteers: 20,000
- Website: www.palestinercs.org

The Palestine Red Crescent Society (PRCS; Arabic: جمعية الهلال الأحمر الفلسطيني, romanized: Jamʻīyat al-Hilāl al-Aḥmar al-Filasṭīnī) is the humanitarian organization that is the International Red Cross and Red Crescent Movement in the State of Palestine, which includes the West Bank, including East Jerusalem, and the Gaza Strip.

The Palestinian branch of the movement was founded in 1968 by Yasser Arafat's brother, Fathi Arafat. The Red Crescent services hospitals and primary health care centers, and provides emergency medicine and ambulance services in the Palestinian territories. Its headquarters are in Ramallah, near Jerusalem.

== History ==
The Red Crescent first established its presence in Palestine in 1910, with the opening of its session in Jerusalem. On 26 December 1968, the Palestinian Red Crescent Society (PRCS) was formally established to address the healthcare needs of Palestinians. On 1 September 1969, the PRCS gained recognition as a National Society with legal status during the sixth session of the Palestinian National Council held in Cairo. Since then, PRCS has played a significant role in the Palestinian territories, offering healthcare and social services. It has a workforce consisting of tens of thousands of Palestinian, Arab, and foreign employees and volunteers.

In June 2006, the Palestine Red Crescent Society was granted full membership status in the International Federation of Red Cross and Red Crescent Societies, following a decision made during the 29th International Conference of the Red Cross and Red Crescent. In the early-2020s during the Gaza war, the Red Crescent described being targeted by Israeli military attacks, resulting in the deaths of more than two dozen of their staff members.

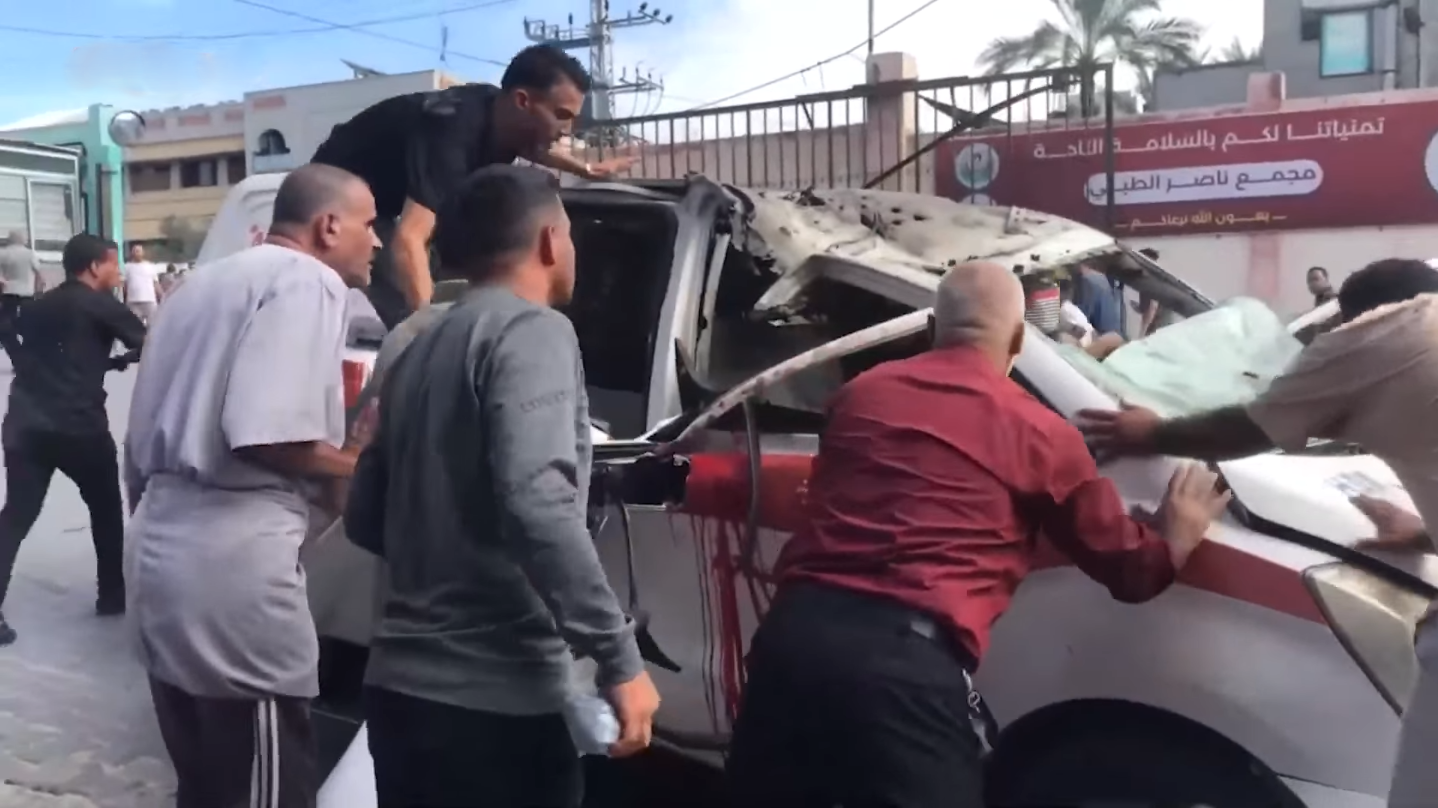
A Palestinian Red Crescent ambulance hit by an Israeli missile in Khan Younis, October 2023.

On 23 March 2025, Israeli forces attacked a Palestine Red Crescent Society ambulance team which was on duty in Rafah, killing at least eight of the ambulance workers. One more worker remains missing as of 30 March. The Israeli military said on 29 March that those killed were a Hamas operative and "eight other terrorists". Eight bodies of the ambulance workers were retrieved on 30 March, "after seven days of silence and having access denied to the area of Rafah where they were last seen", said the International Federation of Red Cross and Red Crescent Societies, which also said that the ambulance team "wore emblems that should have protected them; their ambulances were clearly marked". Israeli forces had buried the bodies in a mass grave and had buried their vehicles nearby.

== Ambulance services ==
Following a 1996 mandate by the then PLO leader Yasser Arafat, the PRCS provides the majority of emergency medical and relief services in the territories, including ambulance services. Ambulance services are provided by 41 stations and substations, 22 mobile field posts, 122 ambulances, 346 emergency medical technicians (EMTs) and over 500 volunteers.

1996 also saw the foundation of the Emergency Medical Institute, which trains staff and EMTs in accordance with international standards. Furthermore, the PRCS has been instrumental in the establishment of the national emergency number (101).

== Special problems ==
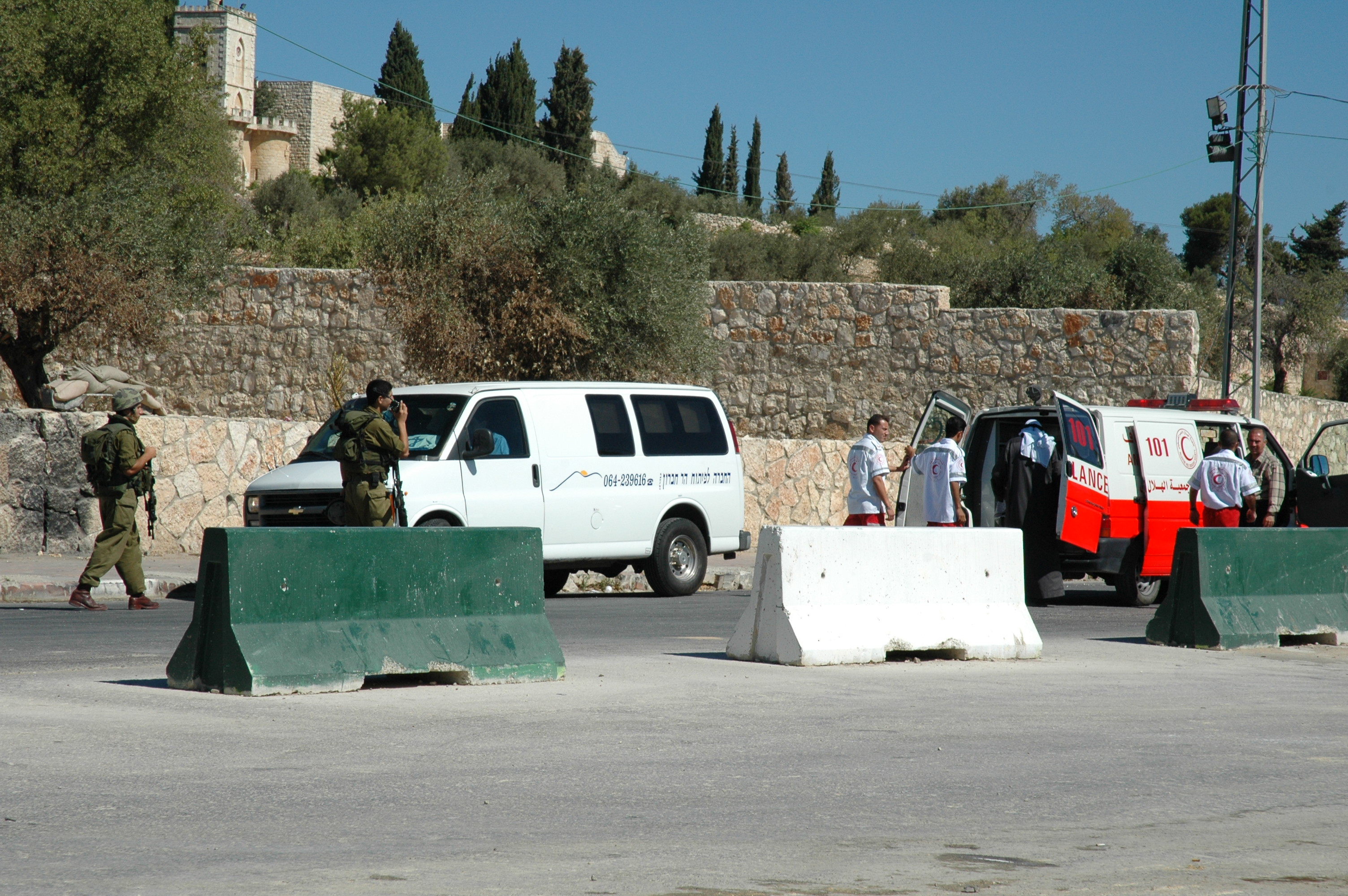
Palestinian Red Crescent ambulance at Israeli checkpoint

BBC News follows Red Crescent Paramedics during the Israel-Hamas war
- 'https://www.bbc.com/news/world-middle-east-68280216

Ongoing conflict between Israelis and Palestinians have complicated the delivery of medical services.

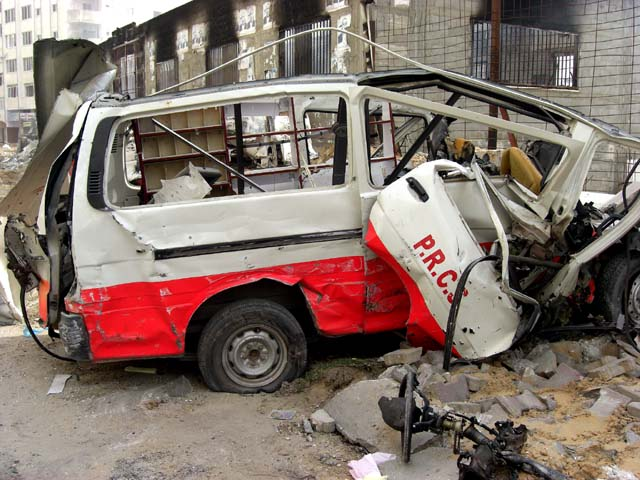
Destroyed ambulance in the city of Shuja'iyya in the Gaza Strip after Israeli shelling of the Al-Quds Hospital

Israeli authorities have required Palestinian ambulances to undergo thorough searches when passing through checkpoints. According to Israeli sources, this policy is the result of Palestinian organizations using ambulances to transport terrorists and armaments during the Second Intifada, making it necessary to inspect Palestinian ambulances regardless of the seriousness of the patient's condition. Israel made similar claims during the 2008–2009 Gaza War; however, Amnesty International denies that Hamas had systematically used medical facilities, vehicles and uniforms as a cover, stating that no evidence had been provided proving such actions. Further, Magen David Adom's submission to the UN Mission investigating the war stated that, "there was no use of PRCS ambulances for the transport of weapons or ammunition ... [and] there was no misuse of the emblem by PRCS." However this policy results in delayed patient care and resulting in significant negative outcomes. For example, between the years 2000 and 2007, it was estimated that 16% of pregnant women had to wait at checkpoints for periods exceeding two hours, resulting in 68 women giving birth at checkpoints, 35 instances of miscarriage, and 5 maternal deaths in a seven-year period.

According to the PRCS, Israeli Defense Force personnel on the ground and in aircraft have deliberately targeted Palestinian ambulances, and prevented or impeded them from carrying out their duties, in violation of international humanitarian law. In 2003, for example, the PRCS reported that seven staff members were injured and 12 ambulances were damaged in attacks by Israeli settlers and the IDF, and PRCS ambulances were denied or delayed access to areas on 584 different occasions.

== See also ==
- Healthcare in the State of Palestine
- List of hospitals in the State of Palestine
- Emergency medical services in Israel
