= Fathi Arafat =

Palestinian physician (1933–2004)

- Arafat in 1986
- Born: 11 January 1933; Cairo
- Died: 1 December 2004 (aged 71); Cairo
- Education: Cairo University
- Occupation: Physician
- Known for: Founder of Palestine Red Crescent Society
- Relatives: Yasser Arafat (brother)

Fathi Arafat (Arabic: فتحي عرفات; 11 January 1933 – 1 December 2004) was a Palestinian physician and a founder and long-term chairman of the Palestine Red Crescent Society. Born in Cairo, he studied medicine at Cairo University from 1950 until 1957 and thereafter practiced as a pediatrician in Egypt, Kuwait and Jordan. He was a younger brother of Palestinian president Yasser Arafat.

Arafat became a member of the Palestinian National Council in 1967. From 1968 he was also President of Palestine General Union of Physicians and Pharmacists. He served as Chief Delegate for Palestine to the World Health Organization from 1982 onwards. From 1992 he was President of the Palestine Academy for Science and Technology (formerly Palestine Academy for Scientific Research) and President of the Palestine Higher Health Council.

Arafat died in Cairo on 1 December 2004 from stomach cancer, less than a month after the death of his brother Yasser.
