= Palast (surname) =

Palast is a German surname. Notable people with the surname include:

- Geri Palast, Managing Director of the Israel Action Network
- Greg Palast (born 1952), American author and freelance journalist
