= Yasser Arafat =

President of Palestine from 1989 to 2004

- ياسر عرفات
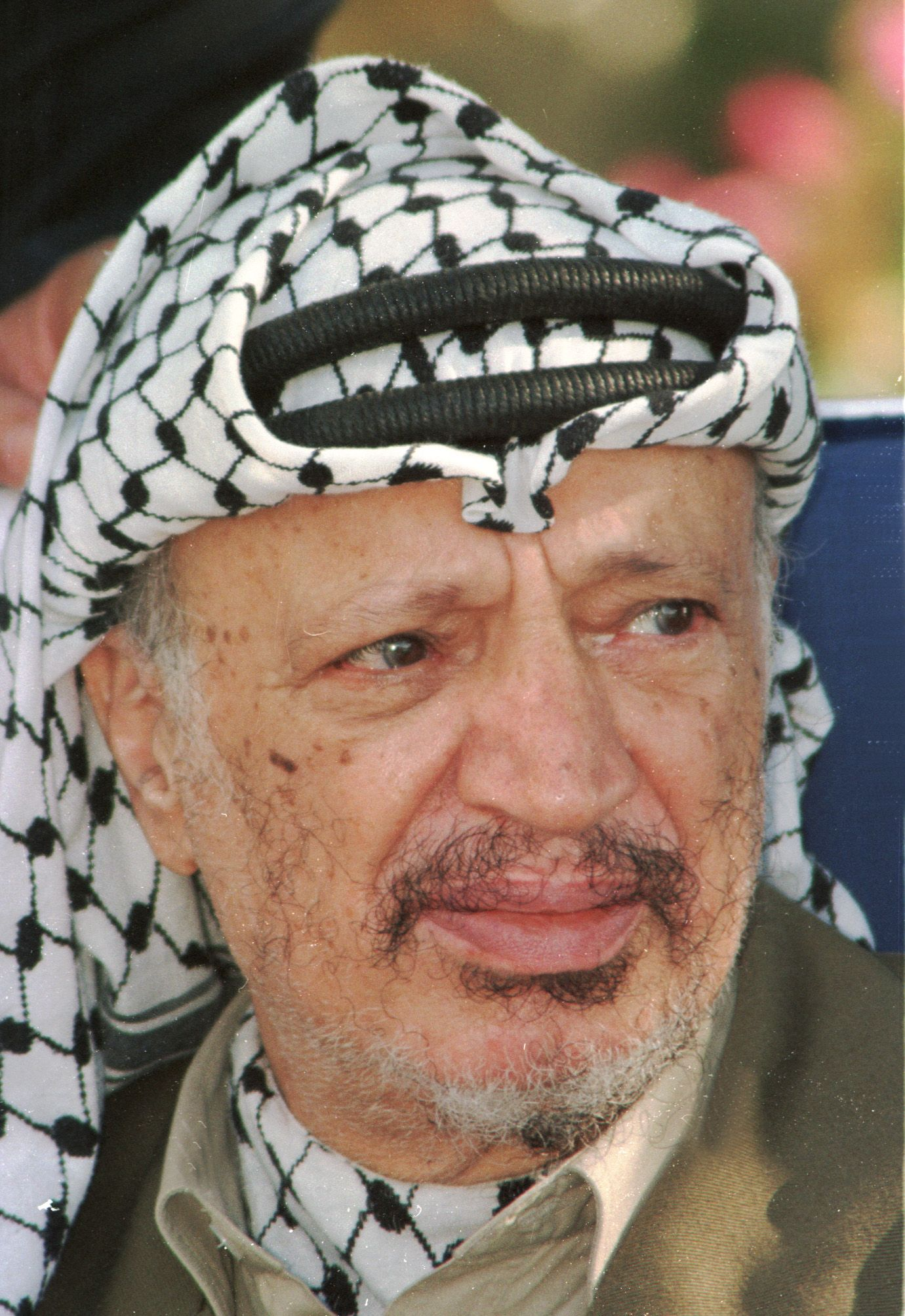
- Arafat in 1996

1st President of the Palestinian National Authority
- In office 5 July 1994 – 11 November 2004
- Prime Minister: Mahmoud Abbas; Ahmed Qurei
- Succeeded by: Rawhi Fattouh (interim); Mahmoud Abbas

1st President of Palestine
- In office 2 April 1989 – 11 November 2004
- Prime Minister: Mahmoud Abbas; Ahmed Qurei
- Succeeded by: Rawhi Fattouh (interim); Mahmoud Abbas

3rd Chairman of the Palestine Liberation Organization
- In office 4 February 1969 – 29 October 2004
- Preceded by: Yahya Hammuda
- Succeeded by: Mahmoud Abbas

Personal details
- Born: Mohammed Abdel Rahman Abdel Raouf Arafat al-Qudwa al-Husseini c. August 1929 Cairo, Egypt
- Died: 11 November 2004 (aged 75) Clamart, Hauts-de-Seine, France
- Resting place: Arafat's compound
- Party: Fatah
- Spouse: Suha Arafat (m. 1990)
- Children: 1
- Education: University of King Fuad I
- Profession: Civil engineer
- Nickname: Abu Ammar

Yasser Arafat (Note: Pronounced /ˈærəfæt/ ARR-ə-fat, US also /ˈɑːrəfɑːt/ AR-ə-faht; Arabic: ياسر عرفات, romanized: Yāsir ʿArafāt, Egyptian Arabic: [ˈjæːser ʕɑrɑˈfɑːt]; full birth name: Mohammed Abdel Rahman Abdel Raouf Arafat al-Qudwa al-Husseini (Arabic: محمد عبد الرحمن عبد الرؤوف عرفات القدوة الحسيني, romanized: Muḥammad ʿAbd ar-Raḥman ʿAbd ar-Raʾūf ʿArafāt al-Qudwa al-Ḥusaynī).) (c. August 1929 – 11 November 2004), also popularly known by his kunya Abu Ammar, (Note: Arabic: أبو عمار, romanized: ʾAbū ʿAmmār.) was a Palestinian political leader. He was chairman of the Palestine Liberation Organization (PLO) from 1969 to 2004, President of Palestine from 1989 to 2004 and President of the Palestinian Authority (PNA) from 1994 to 2004. Ideologically an Arab nationalist and a socialist, Arafat was a founding member of the Fatah political party, which he led from 1959 until 2004.

Arafat was born to Palestinian parents in Cairo, Egypt, where he spent most of his youth. He studied at the University of King Fuad I. While a student, he embraced Arab nationalist and anti-Zionist ideas. Opposed to the 1948 creation of the State of Israel, he fought alongside the Muslim Brotherhood during the 1948 Arab–Israeli War. Following the defeat of Arab forces, Arafat returned to Cairo and served as president of the General Union of Palestinian Students from 1952 to 1956.

In the latter part of the 1950s, Arafat co-founded Fatah, a paramilitary organization which sought Israel's replacement with a Palestinian state. Fatah operated within several Arab countries, from where it launched attacks on Israeli targets. In the latter part of the 1960s Arafat's profile grew; in 1967 he joined the Palestinian Liberation Organization (PLO) and in 1969 was elected chair of the Palestinian National Council (PNC). Fatah's growing presence in Jordan resulted in military clashes with King Hussein's Jordanian government and in the early 1970s it relocated to Lebanon. There, Fatah assisted the Lebanese National Movement during the Lebanese Civil War and continued its attacks on Israel, resulting in the organization becoming a major target of Israeli invasions during the 1978 South Lebanon conflict and 1982 Lebanon War.

From 1983 to 1993, Arafat based himself in Tunisia, and began to shift his approach from open conflict with the Israelis to negotiation. In 1988, he acknowledged Israel's right to exist and sought a two-state solution to the Israeli–Palestinian conflict. In 1994, he returned to Palestine, settling in Gaza City and promoting self-governance for the Palestinian territories. He engaged in a series of negotiations with the Israeli government to end the conflict between it and the PLO. These included the Madrid Conference of 1991, the 1993 Oslo Accords and the 2000 Camp David Summit. The success of the negotiations in Oslo led to Arafat being awarded the Nobel Peace Prize, alongside Israeli prime ministers Yitzhak Rabin and Shimon Peres, in 1994. At the time, Fatah's support among the Palestinians declined with the growth of Hamas and other militant rivals. In late 2004, after effectively being confined within his Ramallah compound for over two years by the Israeli army, Arafat fell into a coma and died. The cause of Arafat's death remains the subject of speculation. Investigations by Russian and French teams determined no foul play was involved, while a Swiss team determined he was radiologically poisoned.

Arafat remains a controversial figure. Palestinians generally view him as a martyr who symbolized the national aspirations of his people, while many Israelis regarded him as a terrorist. Palestinian rivals, including Islamists and several PLO radicals, frequently denounced him as corrupt or too submissive in his concessions to the Israeli government.

== Early life ==
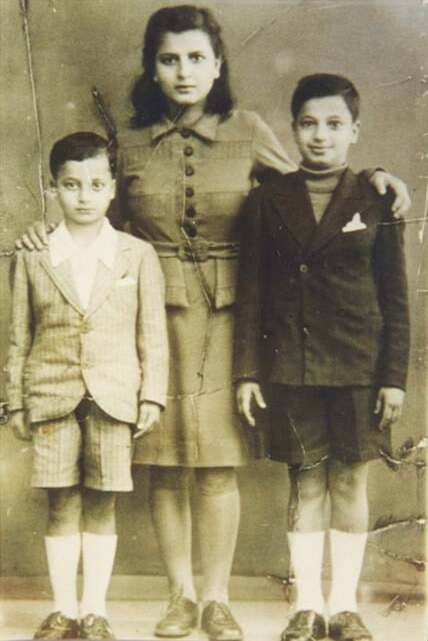
Arafat (right) with his sister Khadija and brother Fathi in Cairo, 1942

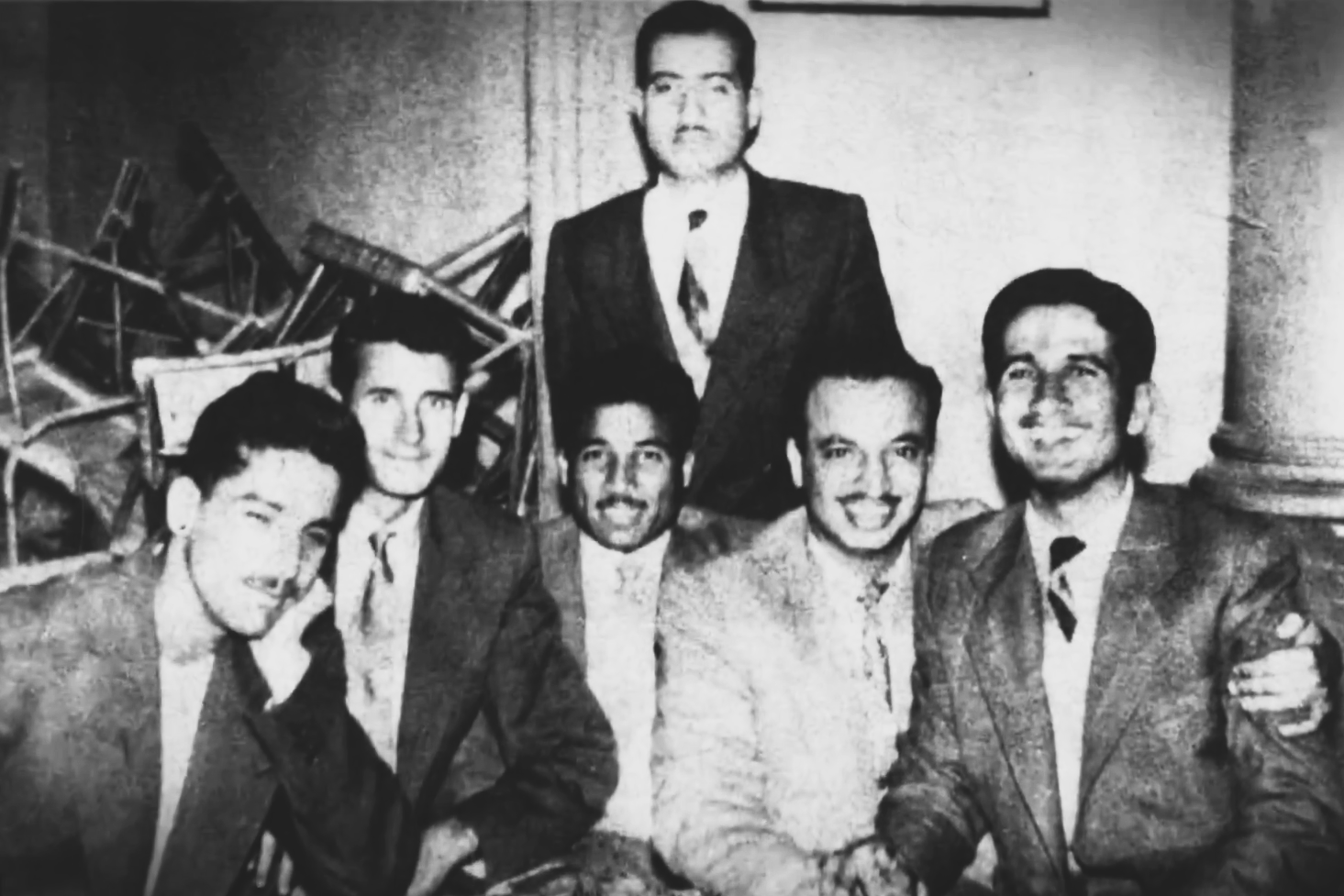
Arafat (center right) during his time as an engineering student at the University of King Fuad I in Egypt, 1950s

=== Birth and childhood ===
Arafat was born in Cairo, Egypt, on 4 or 24 August 1929. His father, Abdel Raouf al-Qudwa al-Husseini, a distant relative of Amin al-Husseini, the former Grand Mufti of Jerusalem, was a Palestinian from Gaza City, whose mother, Yasser's paternal grandmother, was Egyptian. Arafat's father battled in the Egyptian courts for 25 years to claim family land in Egypt as part of his inheritance but was unsuccessful. He worked as a textile merchant in Cairo's religiously mixed Sakakini District. Arafat was the second-youngest of seven children and was, along with his younger brother Fathi, the only offspring born in Cairo. Jerusalem was the family home of his mother, Zahwa Abul Saud, who died from a kidney ailment in 1933, when Arafat was four years of age.

Arafat's first visit to Jerusalem came when his father, unable to raise seven children alone, sent Yasser and his brother Fathi to their mother's family in the Mughrabi Quarter of the Old City. They lived there with their uncle Salim Abul Saud for four years. In 1937, their father recalled them to be taken care of by their older sister, Inam. Arafat had a deteriorating relationship with his father; when he died in 1952, Arafat did not attend the funeral, nor did he visit his father's grave upon his return to Gaza. Arafat's sister Inam stated in an interview with Arafat's biographer, British historian Alan Hart, that Arafat was heavily beaten by his father for going to the Jewish quarter in Cairo and attending religious services. When she asked Arafat why he would not stop going, he responded by saying that he wanted to study Jewish mentality.

=== Education ===
Arafat enrolled in the University of King Fuad I in 1944 and graduated in 1950. He engaged Jews in discussion at the university, and read publications by Theodor Herzl and other prominent Zionists. He became an Arab nationalist by 1946, and began procuring weapons to be smuggled into Mandatory Palestine, for use by irregulars in the Arab Higher Committee and the Army of the Holy War militias. He left the university as the 1948 Arab–Israeli War began, and sought to join Arab forces fighting against the Haganah. He procured arms during the war for the Mufti of Jerusalem Amin al-Husseini's troops. However, instead of joining the ranks of the Palestinian fedayeen, Arafat fought alongside the Muslim Brotherhood, although he did not join the organization. He took part in combat in the Gaza area (which was the main battleground of Egyptian forces during the conflict). The war was winding down in Israel's favor by early 1949, and Arafat returned to Cairo due to a lack of logistical support.

He returned to university and studied civil engineering, and served as president of the General Union of Palestinian Students (GUPS) from 1952 to 1956. During his first year as president of the union, the university was renamed Cairo University after a coup was carried out by the Free Officers Movement overthrowing King Farouk I. By that time, Arafat had graduated with a bachelor's degree in civil engineering and was called to duty to fight with Egyptian forces during the Suez Crisis; however, he never actually fought. At a conference in Prague later that year, he donned a solid white keffiyeh, which was different from the fishnet-patterned one he adopted later in Kuwait, and later became his emblem.

=== Personal life ===
Arafat had adopted fifty Palestinian war orphans prior to his marriage. He was introduced to a Palestinian Christian, Suha Tawil, by her mother in France. They married in 1990, when he was 61 while Suha was 27. She subsequently converted to Islam. Suha tried to leave Arafat on many occasions during their marriage, but he forbade it. Suha gave birth to a daughter in Paris in 1995, named Zahwa after Arafat's mother. Suha said after his death that she regrets the marriage, and given the choice again, would not repeat it.

=== Name ===
Arafat's full name was Mohammed Abdel Rahman Abdel Raouf Arafat al-Qudwa al-Husseini. Mohammed Abdel Rahman was his first name, Abdel Raouf was his father's name and Arafat his grandfather's. Al-Qudwa was the name of his tribe and al-Husseini was that of the clan to which the al-Qudwas belonged. The al-Husseini clan was based in Gaza and is not related to the well-known al-Husayni clan of Jerusalem, other notable family members include Amin al-Husseini.

Since Arafat was raised in Cairo, the tradition of dropping the Mohammed or Ahmad portion of one's first name was common; notable Egyptians such as Anwar Sadat and Hosni Mubarak did so. However, Arafat dropped Abdel Rahman and Abdel Raouf from his name as well. During the early 1950s, Arafat adopted the name Yasser, and in the early years of Arafat's guerrilla career, he assumed the nom de guerre of Abu Ammar. Both names are related to Ammar ibn Yasir, one of Muhammad's early companions. Although he dropped most of his inherited names, he retained Arafat due to its significance in Islam.

== Rise of Fatah ==
=== Founding of Fatah ===
Following the Suez Crisis in 1956, Egyptian president Gamal Abdel Nasser agreed to allow the United Nations Emergency Force to establish itself in the Sinai Peninsula and Gaza Strip, precipitating the expulsion of all guerrilla or "fedayeen" forces there—including Arafat. Arafat originally attempted to obtain a visa to Canada and later Saudi Arabia, but was unsuccessful in both attempts. In 1957, he applied for a visa to Kuwait (at the time a British protectorate) and was approved, based on his work in civil engineering. There he encountered two Palestinian friends: Salah Khalaf ("Abu Iyad") and Khalil al-Wazir ("Abu Jihad"), both official members of the Egyptian Muslim Brotherhood. Arafat had met Abu Iyad while attending Cairo University and Abu Jihad in Gaza. Both would later become Arafat's top aides. Abu Iyad traveled with Arafat to Kuwait in late 1960; Abu Jihad, also working as a teacher, had already been living there since 1959. After settling in Kuwait, Abu Iyad helped Arafat obtain a temporary job as a schoolteacher.

As Arafat began to develop friendships with Palestinian refugees (some of whom he knew from his Cairo days), he and the others gradually founded the group that became known as Fatah. The exact date for the establishment of Fatah is unknown. In 1959, the group's existence was attested to in the pages of a Palestinian nationalist magazine, Filastununa Nida al-Hayat (Our Palestine, The Call of Life), which was written and edited by Abu Jihad. FaTaH is a reverse acronym of the Arabic name Harakat al-Tahrir al-Watani al-Filastini which translates into "The Palestinian National Liberation Movement". "Fatah" is also a word that was used in early Islamic times to refer to "conquest".

Fatah dedicated itself to the liberation of Palestine by an armed struggle carried out by Palestinians themselves. This differed from other Palestinian political and guerrilla organizations, most of which firmly believed in a united Arab response. Arafat's organization never embraced the ideologies of the major Arab governments of the time, in contrast to other Palestinian factions, which often became satellites of nations such as Egypt, Iraq, Saudi Arabia, Syria and others.

In accordance with his ideology, Arafat generally refused to accept donations to his organization from major Arab governments, in order to act independently of them. He did not want to alienate them, and sought their undivided support by avoiding ideological alliances. However, to establish the groundwork for Fatah's future financial support, he enlisted contributions from the many wealthy Palestinians working in Kuwait and other Arab states of the Persian Gulf, such as Qatar (where he met Mahmoud Abbas in 1961). These businessmen and oil workers contributed generously to the Fatah organization. Arafat continued this process in other Arab countries, such as Libya and Syria.

In 1962, Arafat and his closest companions migrated to Syria—a country sharing a border with Israel—which had recently seceded from its union with Egypt. Fatah had approximately three hundred members by this time, but none were fighters. In Syria, he managed to recruit members by offering them higher incomes to enable his armed attacks against Israel. Fatah's manpower was incremented further after Arafat decided to offer new recruits much higher salaries than members of the Palestine Liberation Army (PLA), the regular military force of the Palestine Liberation Organization (PLO), which was created by the Arab League in 1964. On 31 December, a squad from al-Assifa, Fatah's armed wing, attempted to infiltrate Israel, but they were intercepted and detained by Lebanese security forces. Several other raids with Fatah's poorly trained and badly equipped fighters followed this incident. Some were successful, others failed in their missions. Arafat often led these incursions personally.

Arafat was detained in Syria's Mezzeh Prison when a Palestinian Syrian Army officer, Yusef Urabi, was killed. Urabi had been chairing a meeting to ease tensions between Arafat and Palestinian Liberation Front leader Ahmed Jibril, but neither Arafat nor Jibril attended, delegating representatives to attend on their behalf. Urabi was killed during or after the meeting amid disputed circumstances. On the orders of Defense Minister Hafez al-Assad, a close friend of Urabi, Arafat was subsequently arrested, found guilty by a three-man jury and sentenced to death. However, he and his colleagues were pardoned by President Salah Jadid shortly after the verdict. The incident brought Assad and Arafat to unpleasant terms, which would surface later when Assad became President of Syria.

=== Leader of the Palestinians ===
On 13 November 1966, Israel launched a major raid against the Jordanian administered West Bank town of as-Samu, in response to a Fatah-implemented roadside bomb attack which had killed three members of the Israeli security forces near the southern Green Line border. In the resulting skirmish, scores of Jordanian security forces were killed and 125 homes razed. This raid was one of several factors that led to the 1967 Six-Day War.

The Six-Day war began when Israel launched air strikes against Egypt's air force on 5 June 1967. The war ended in an Arab defeat and Israel's occupation of several Arab territories, including the West Bank and Gaza Strip. Although Nasser and his Arab allies had been defeated, Arafat and Fatah could claim a victory, in that the majority of Palestinians, who had up to that time tended to align and sympathize with individual Arab governments, now began to agree that a 'Palestinian' solution to their dilemma was indispensable. Many primarily Palestinian political parties, including George Habash's Arab Nationalist Movement, Hajj Amin al-Husseini's Arab Higher Committee, the Islamic Liberation Front and several Syrian-backed groups, virtually crumbled after their sponsor governments' defeat. Barely a week after the defeat, Arafat crossed the Jordan River in disguise and entered the West Bank, where he set up recruitment centers in Hebron, the Jerusalem area and Nablus, and began attracting both fighters and financiers for his cause.

At the same time, Nasser contacted Arafat through the former's adviser Mohammed Heikal and Arafat was declared by Nasser to be the "leader of the Palestinians." In December 1967 Ahmad Shukeiri resigned his post as PLO Chairman. Yahya Hammuda took his place and invited Arafat to join the organization. Fatah was allocated 33 of 105 seats of the PLO Executive Committee while 57 seats were left for several other guerrilla factions.

=== Battle of Karameh ===
Throughout 1968, Fatah and other Palestinian armed groups were the target of a major Israeli army operation in the Jordanian village of Karameh, where the Fatah headquarters—as well as a mid-sized Palestinian refugee camp—were located. The town's name is the Arabic word for 'dignity', which elevated its symbolism in the eyes of the Arab people, especially after the collective Arab defeat in 1967. The operation was in response to attacks, including rockets strikes from Fatah and other Palestinian militias, within the Israeli-occupied West Bank. According to Said Aburish, the government of Jordan and a number of Fatah commandos informed Arafat that large-scale Israeli military preparations for an attack on the town were underway, prompting fedayeen groups, such as George Habash's newly formed Popular Front for the Liberation of Palestine (PFLP) and Nayef Hawatmeh's breakaway organization the Democratic Front for the Liberation of Palestine (DFLP), to withdraw their forces from the town. Though advised by a sympathetic Jordanian Army divisional commander to withdraw his men and headquarters to the nearby hills, Arafat refused, stating, "We want to convince the world that there are those in the Arab world who will not withdraw or flee." Aburish writes that it was on Arafat's orders that Fatah remained, and that the Jordanian Army agreed to back them if heavy fighting ensued.

In response to persistent PLO raids against Israeli civilian targets, Israel attacked the town of Karameh, Jordan, the site of a major PLO camp. The goal of the invasion was to destroy Karameh camp and capture Yasser Arafat in reprisal for the attacks by the PLO against Israeli civilians, which culminated when an Israeli bus carrying 17- and 18-year-old high school students hit a mine planted near the Be'er Ora Gadna base, killing a soldier and a medical doctor who were onboard and injuring multiple students. However, plans for the two operations were prepared in 1967, one year before the bus attack. The size of the Israeli forces entering Karameh made the Jordanians assume that Israel was also planning to occupy the eastern bank of the Jordan River, including the Balqa Governorate, to create a situation similar to the Golan Heights, which Israel had captured just 10 months prior, to be used a bargaining chip. Israel assumed that the Jordanian Army would ignore the invasion, but the latter fought alongside the Palestinians, opening heavy fire that inflicted losses upon the Israeli forces. This engagement marked the first known deployment of suicide bombers by Palestinian forces. The Israelis were repelled at the end of a day's battle, having destroyed most of the Karameh camp and taken around 141 PLO prisoners. Both sides declared victory. On a tactical level, the battle went in Israel's favor and the destruction of the Karameh camp was achieved. However, the relatively high casualties were a considerable surprise for the Israel Defense Forces and was stunning to the Israelis. Although the Palestinians were not victorious on their own, King Hussein let the Palestinians take credit. Some have alleged that Arafat himself was on the battlefield, but the details of his involvement are unclear. However, his allies–as well as Israeli intelligence–confirm that he urged his men throughout the battle to hold their ground and continue fighting. The battle was covered in detail by Time, and Arafat's face appeared on the cover of the 13 December 1968 issue, bringing his image to the world for the first time. Amid the post-war environment, the profiles of Arafat and Fatah were raised by this important turning point, and he came to be regarded as a national hero who dared to confront Israel. With mass applause from the Arab world, financial donations increased significantly, and Fatah's weaponry and equipment improved. The group's numbers swelled as many young Arabs, including thousands of non-Palestinians, joined the ranks of Fatah.

When the Palestinian National Council (PNC) convened in Cairo on 3 February 1969, Yahya Hammuda stepped down from his chairmanship of the PLO. Arafat was elected chairman on 4 February. He became Commander-in-Chief of the Palestinian Revolutionary Forces two years later, and in 1973, became the head of the PLO's political department.

== Confrontation with Jordan ==
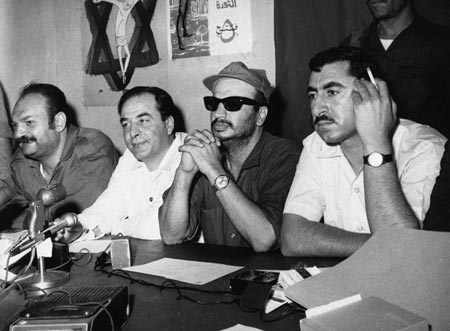
Arafat with Democratic Front for the Liberation of Palestine leader, Nayef Hawatmeh and Palestinian writer Kamal Nasser at press conference in Amman, 1970

In the late 1960s, tensions between Palestinians and the Jordanian government increased greatly; heavily armed Palestinian elements had created a virtual "state within a state" in Jordan, eventually controlling several strategic positions in that country. After their proclaimed victory in the Battle of Karameh, Fatah and other Palestinian militias began taking control of civil life in Jordan. They set up roadblocks, publicly humiliated Jordanian police forces, molested women and levied illegal taxes—all of which Arafat either condoned or ignored. King Hussein considered this a growing threat to his kingdom's sovereignty and security, and attempted to disarm the militias. However, in order to avoid a military confrontation with opposition forces, Hussein dismissed several of his anti-PLO cabinet officials, including some of his own family members, and invited Arafat to become Deputy Prime Minister of Jordan. Arafat refused, citing his belief in the need for a Palestinian state with Palestinian leadership.

Despite Hussein's intervention, militant actions in Jordan continued. On 15 September 1970, the PFLP (part of the PLO) hijacked four planes and landed three of them at Dawson's Field, located 30 miles (48 km) east of Amman. After the foreign national hostages were taken off the planes and moved away from them, three of the planes were blown up in front of international press, which took photos of the explosion. This tarnished Arafat's image in many western nations, including the United States, who held him responsible for controlling Palestinian factions that belonged to the PLO. Arafat, bowing to pressure from Arab governments, publicly condemned the hijackings and suspended the PFLP from any guerrilla actions for a few weeks. He had taken the same action after the PFLP attacked Athens Airport. The Jordanian government moved to regain control over its territory, and the next day, King Hussein declared martial law. On the same day, Arafat became supreme commander of the PLA.

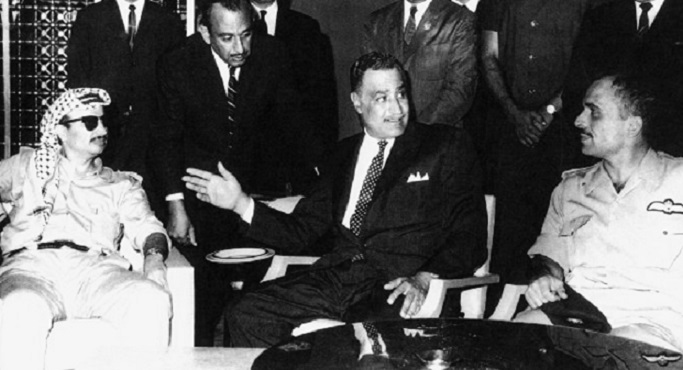
Egyptian President Gamal Abdel Nasser (center) mediating an agreement between Arafat and Jordanian King Hussein to end to the Black September conflict, during the emergency Arab League summit, September 1970

As the conflict raged, other Arab governments attempted to negotiate a peaceful resolution. As part of this effort, Gamal Abdel Nasser led the first emergency Arab League summit in Cairo on 21 September. Arafat's speech drew sympathy from attending Arab leaders. Other heads of state took sides against Hussein, among them Muammar Gaddafi, who mocked him and his schizophrenic father King Talal. A ceasefire was agreed upon between the two sides, but Nasser died of a massive heart attack hours after the summit, and the conflict resumed shortly afterward.

By 25 September, the Jordanian Army achieved dominance, and two days later Arafat and Hussein agreed to a ceasefire in Amman. The Jordanian Army inflicted heavy casualties on the Palestinians—including civilians—who suffered approximately 3,500 fatalities. After repeated violations of the ceasefire from both the PLO and the Jordanian Army, Arafat called for King Hussein to be toppled. Responding to the threat, in June 1971, Hussein ordered his forces to oust all remaining Palestinian fighters in northern Jordan, which they accomplished. Arafat and a number of his forces, including two high-ranking commanders, Abu Iyad and Abu Jihad, were forced into the northern corner of Jordan. They relocated near the town of Jerash, near the border with Syria. With the help of Munib Masri, a pro-Palestinian Jordanian cabinet member, and Fahd al-Khomeimi, the Saudi ambassador to Jordan, Arafat managed to enter Syria with nearly two thousand of his fighters. However, due to the hostility of relations between Arafat and Syrian President Hafez al-Assad (who had since ousted President Salah Jadid), the Palestinian fighters crossed the border into Lebanon to join PLO forces in that country, where they set up their new headquarters.

== Headquarters in Lebanon ==
=== Official recognition ===
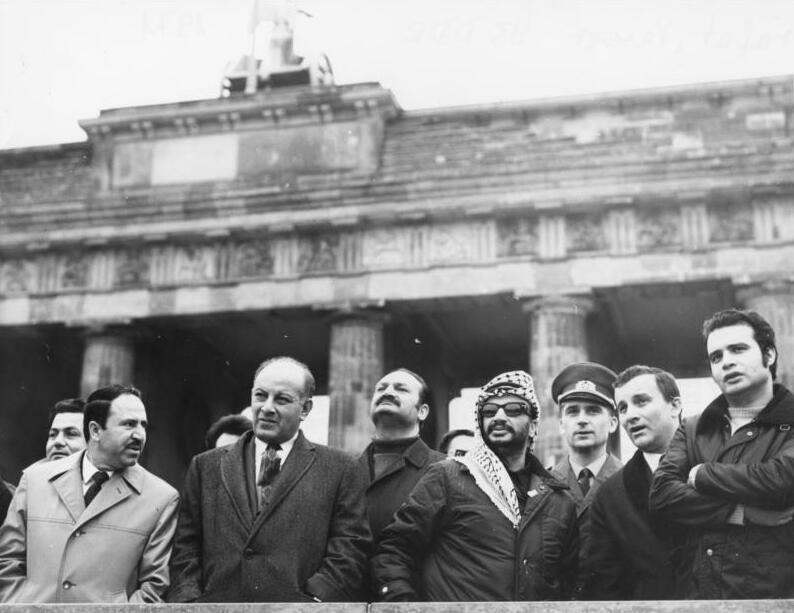
Yasser Arafat visits East Germany in 1971; background: Brandenburg Gate

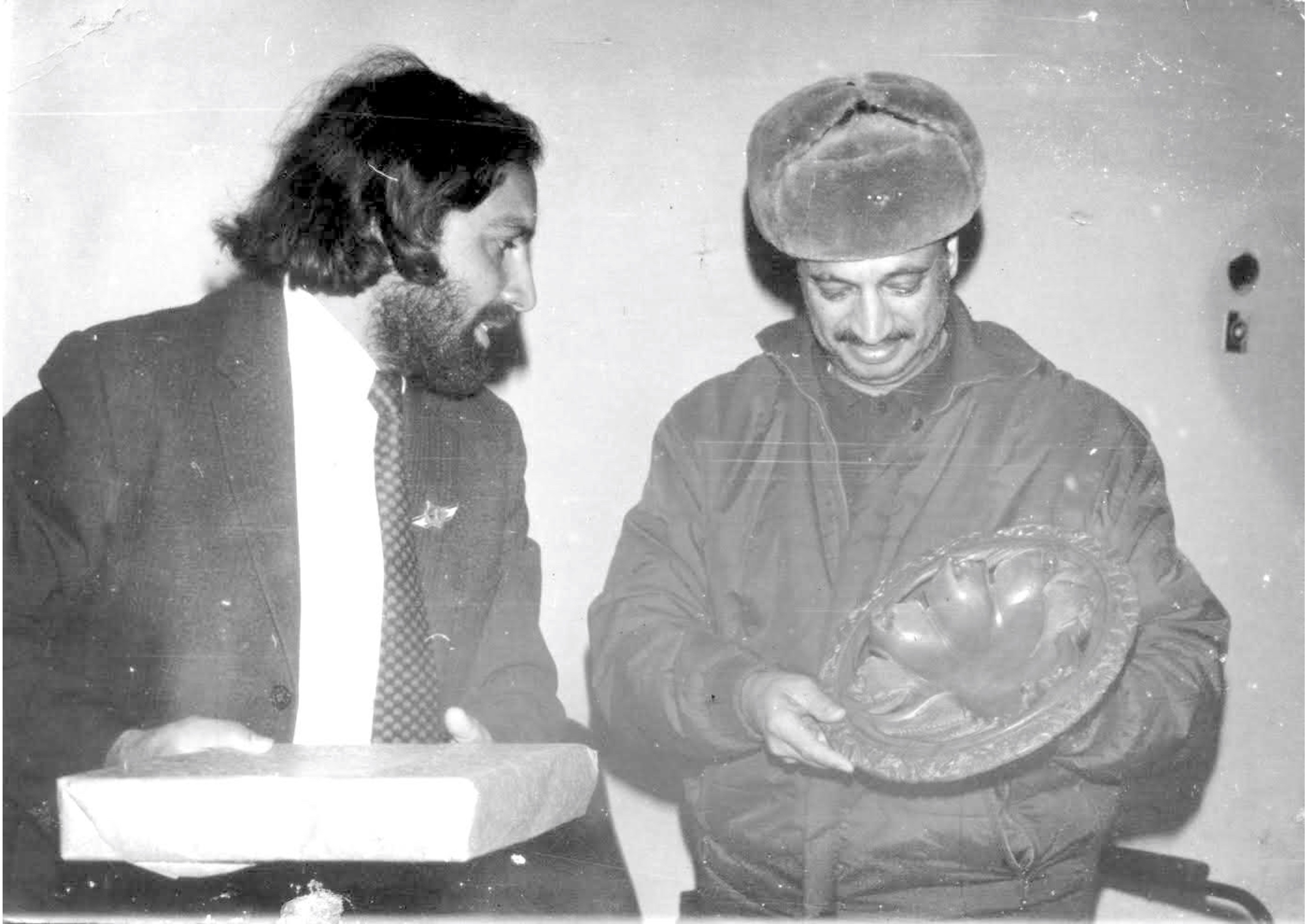
Yasser Arafat with Bhim Singh, founder of Jammu and Kashmir National Panthers Party, in the 1970s

Because of Lebanon's weak central government, the PLO was able to operate virtually as an independent state. During this time in the 1970s, numerous leftist PLO groups took up arms against Israel, carrying out attacks against civilians as well as military targets within Israel and outside of it.

Two major incidents occurred in 1972. The Fatah subgroup Black September Organization hijacked Sabena Flight 572 en route to Vienna and forced it to land at the Ben Gurion International Airport in Israel. The PFLP and the Japanese Red Army carried out a shooting rampage at the same airport, killing twenty-four civilians. Israel later claimed that the assassination of PFLP spokesman Ghassan Kanafani was a response to the PFLP's involvement in masterminding the latter attack. Two days later, various PLO factions retaliated by bombing a bus station, killing eleven civilians.

At the Munich Olympic Games, Black September kidnapped and killed eleven Israeli athletes. A number of sources, including Mohammed Oudeh (Abu Daoud), one of the masterminds of the Munich massacre, and Benny Morris, a prominent Israeli historian, have stated that Black September was an armed branch of Fatah used for paramilitary operations. According to Abu Daoud's 1999 book, "Arafat was briefed on plans for the Munich hostage-taking." The killings were internationally condemned. In 1973–74, Arafat closed Black September down, ordering the PLO to withdraw from acts of violence outside Israel, the West Bank and Gaza Strip.

In 1974, the PNC approved the Ten Point Program (drawn up by Arafat and his advisers), and proposed a compromise with the Israelis. It called for a Palestinian national authority over every part of "liberated" Palestinian territory, which refers to areas captured by Arab forces in the 1948 Arab–Israeli War (present-day West Bank, East Jerusalem and Gaza Strip). This caused discontent among several of the PLO factions; the PFLP, DFLP and other parties formed a breakaway organization, the Rejectionist Front.

Israel and the US have alleged also that Arafat was involved in the 1973 Khartoum diplomatic assassinations, in which five diplomats and five others were killed. A 1973 United States Department of State document, declassified in 2006, concluded "The Khartoum operation was planned and carried out with the full knowledge and personal approval of Yasser Arafat." Arafat denied any involvement in the operation and insisted it was carried out independently by the Black September Organization. Israel claimed that Arafat was in ultimate control over these organizations and therefore had not abandoned terrorism.

In addition, some circles within the US State Department viewed Arafat as an able diplomat and negotiator who could get support from many Arab governments at once. An example of that, in March 1973, Arafat tried to arrange for a meeting between the President of Iraq and the Emir of Kuwait in order to resolve their disputes.

Also in 1974, the PLO was declared the "sole legitimate representative of the Palestinian people" and admitted to full membership of the Arab League at the Rabat Summit. Arafat became the first representative of a non-governmental organization to address a plenary session of the UN General Assembly. In his United Nations address, Arafat condemned Zionism, but said:

Today I have come bearing an olive branch in one hand and a freedom fighter's rifle in another. Do not let the green branch fall from my hand.

He wore a holster throughout his speech, although it did not contain a gun. His speech increased international sympathy for the Palestinian cause.

Following recognition, Arafat established relationships with a variety of world leaders, including Saddam Hussein and Idi Amin. Arafat was Amin's best man at his wedding in Uganda in 1975.

=== Fatah involvement in Lebanese Civil War ===
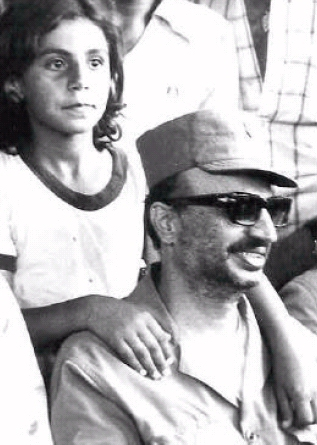
Arafat in a Palestinian refugee camp in Southern Lebanon, 1978

Although hesitant at first to take sides in the conflict, Arafat and Fatah played an important role in the Lebanese Civil War. Succumbing to pressure from PLO sub-groups such as the PFLP, DFLP and the Palestinian Liberation Front (PLF), Arafat aligned the PLO with the Communist and Nasserist Lebanese National Movement (LNM). The LNM was led by Kamal Jumblatt, who had a friendly relationship with Arafat and other PLO leaders. Although originally aligned with Fatah, Syrian President Hafez al-Assad feared a loss of influence in Lebanon and switched sides. He sent his army, along with the Syrian-backed Palestinian factions of as-Sa'iqa and the Popular Front for the Liberation of Palestine – General Command (PFLP-GC) led by Ahmad Jibril to fight alongside right-wing Christian forces against the PLO and the LNM. The primary components of the Christian front were the Phalangists loyal to Bachir Gemayel and the Tigers Militia led by Dany Chamoun, a son of former President Camille Chamoun.

In February 1975, a pro-Palestinian Lebanese MP, Maarouf Saad, was shot and killed, reportedly by the Lebanese Army. His death from his wounds, the following month, and the massacre in April of 27 Palestinians and Lebanese travelling on a bus from Sabra and Shatila to the Tel al-Zaatar refugee camp by Phalangist forces precipitated the Lebanese Civil War. Arafat was reluctant to respond with force, but many other Fatah and PLO members felt otherwise. For example, the DFLP carried out several attacks against the Lebanese Army. In 1976, an alliance of Christian militias with the backing of the Lebanese and Syrian armies besieged Tel al-Zaatar camp in east Beirut. The PLO and LNM retaliated by attacking the town of Damour, a Phalangist stronghold where they massacred 684 people and wounded many more. The Tel al-Zaatar camp fell to the Christians after a six-month siege in which thousands of Palestinians, mostly civilians, were killed. Arafat and Abu Jihad blamed themselves for not successfully organizing a rescue effort.

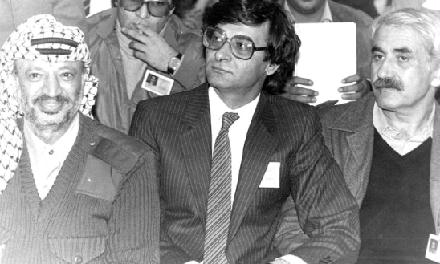
Arafat with Palestinian poet Mahmoud Darwish (center) and PFLP leader George Habash (right) in Syria, 1980

PLO cross-border raids against Israel grew during the late 1970s. One of the most severe—known as the Coastal Road massacre—occurred on 11 March 1978. A force of nearly a dozen Fatah fighters landed their boats near a major coastal road connecting the city of Haifa with Tel Aviv-Yafo. There they hijacked a bus and sprayed gunfire inside and at passing vehicles, killing thirty-seven civilians. In response, the IDF launched Operation Litani three days later, with the goal of taking control of Southern Lebanon up to the Litani River. The IDF achieved this goal, and Arafat withdrew PLO forces north into Beirut.

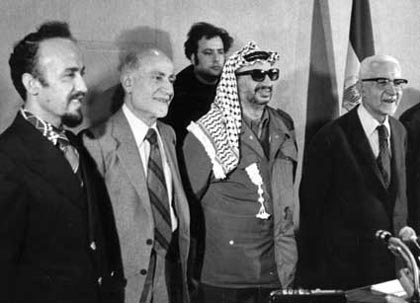
Arafat with Iranian Prime Minister Mehdi Bazargan, days after Iranian Revolution

After Israel withdrew from Lebanon, cross-border hostilities between PLO forces and Israel continued, though from August 1981 to May 1982, the PLO adopted an official policy of refraining from responding to provocations. On 6 June 1982, Israel launched an invasion of Lebanon to expel the PLO from southern Lebanon. Beirut was soon besieged and bombarded by the IDF; Arafat declared the city to be the "Hanoi and Stalingrad of the Israeli army." The Civil War's first phase ended and Arafat—who was commanding Fatah forces at Tel al-Zaatar—narrowly escaped with assistance from Saudi and Kuwaiti diplomats. Towards the end of the siege, the US and European governments brokered an agreement guaranteeing safe passage for Arafat and the PLO—guarded by a multinational force of eight hundred US Marines supported by the United States Navy—to exile in Tunis.

During the war, Arafat took measures to protect the Lebanese Jewish community. He ordered the PLO fighters to guard the Maghen Abraham Synagogue of Beirut and deliver food to affected Jewish families. After Arafat left Lebanon, the synagogue's protection was managed by the Phalangists.

Arafat returned to Lebanon a year after his eviction from Beirut, this time establishing himself in the northern Lebanese city of Tripoli. This time Arafat was expelled by a fellow Palestinian working under Hafez al-Assad. Arafat did not return to Lebanon after his second expulsion, though many Fatah fighters did.

== Headquarters in Tunisia ==
Arafat and Fatah's center for operations was based in Tunis, the capital of Tunisia, until 1993. In 1985 Arafat narrowly survived an Israeli assassination attempt when Israeli Air Force F-15s bombed his Tunis headquarters as part of Operation Wooden Leg, leaving 73 people dead; Arafat had gone out jogging that morning. The following year Arafat had his operational headquarters in Baghdad for some time.

=== First Intifada ===
During the 1980s, Arafat received financial assistance from Libya, Iraq and Saudi Arabia, which allowed him to reconstruct the badly damaged PLO. This was particularly useful during the First Intifada in December 1987, which began as an uprising of Palestinians against the Israeli occupation of the West Bank and Gaza Strip. The word Intifada in Arabic is literally translated as "tremor"; however, it is generally defined as an uprising or revolt.

The first stage of the Intifada began following an incident at the Erez checkpoint where four Palestinian residents of the Jabalya refugee camp were killed in a traffic accident involving an Israeli driver. Rumors spread that the deaths were a deliberate act of revenge for an Israeli shopper who was stabbed to death by a Palestinian in Gaza four days earlier. Mass rioting broke out, and within weeks, partly upon consistent requests by Abu Jihad, Arafat attempted to direct the uprising, which lasted until 1992–93. Abu Jihad had previously been assigned the responsibility of the Palestinian territories within the PLO command and, according to biographer Said Aburish, had "impressive knowledge of local conditions" in the Israeli-occupied territories. On 16 April 1988, as the Intifada was raging, Abu Jihad was assassinated in his Tunis household by an Israeli hit squad. Arafat had considered Abu Jihad as a PLO counterweight to local Palestinian leadership in the territories, and led a funeral procession for him in Damascus.

The most common tactic used by Palestinians during the Intifada was throwing stones, molotov cocktails, and burning tires. The local leadership in some West Bank towns commenced non-violent protests against Israeli occupation by engaging in tax resistance and other boycotts. Israel responded by confiscating large sums of money in house-to-house raids. As the Intifada came to a close, new armed Palestinian groups—in particular Hamas and the Palestinian Islamic Jihad (PIJ)—began targeting Israeli civilians with the new tactic of suicide bombings, and internal fighting amongst the Palestinians increased dramatically.

=== Change in direction ===
In August 1970, Arafat declared: "Our basic aim is to liberate the land from the Mediterranean Sea to the Jordan River. We are not concerned with what took place in June 1967 or in eliminating the consequences of the June war. The Palestinian revolution's basic concern is the uprooting of the Zionist entity from our land and liberating it." However, in early 1976, at a meeting with US Senator Adlai Stevenson III, Arafat suggested that if Israel withdrew a "few kilometers" from parts of the West Bank and the Gaza Strip and transferred responsibility to the UN, Arafat could give "something to show his people before he could acknowledge Israel's right to exist".

On 15 November 1988, the PLO proclaimed the independent State of Palestine. Though he had frequently been accused of and associated with terrorism, in speeches on 13 and 14 December Arafat repudiated 'terrorism in all its forms, including state terrorism'. He accepted UN Security Council Resolution 242 and Israel's right "to exist in peace and security" and Arafat's statements were greeted with approval by the US administration, which had long insisted on these statements as a necessary starting point for official discussions between the US and the PLO. These remarks from Arafat indicated a shift away from one of the PLO's primary aims—the destruction of Israel (as entailed in the Palestinian National Covenant)–and toward the establishment of two separate entities: an Israeli state within the 1949 armistice lines, and an Arab state in the West Bank and the Gaza Strip. On 2 April 1989, Arafat was elected by the Central Council of the Palestine National Council, the governing body of the PLO, to be the president of the proclaimed State of Palestine.

Prior to the Gulf War in 1990–91, when the Intifada's intensity began to wear down, Arafat supported Saddam Hussein's invasion of Kuwait and opposed the US-led coalition attack on Iraq. He made this decision without the consent of other leading members of Fatah and the PLO. Arafat's top aide Abu Iyad vowed to stay neutral and opposed an alliance with Saddam; on 17 January 1991, Abu Iyad was assassinated by the Abu Nidal Organization. Arafat's decision also severed relations with Egypt and many of the oil-producing Arab states that supported the US-led coalition. Many in the US also used Arafat's position as a reason to disregard his claims to being a partner for peace. After the end of hostilities, many Arab states that backed the coalition cut off funds to the PLO and began providing financial support for the organization's rival Hamas and other Islamist groups. Arafat narrowly escaped death again on 7 April 1992, when an Air Bissau aircraft he was a passenger on crash-landed in the Libyan Desert during a sandstorm. Two pilots and an engineer were killed; Arafat was bruised and shaken.

== Palestinian Authority and peace negotiations ==
=== Oslo Accords ===
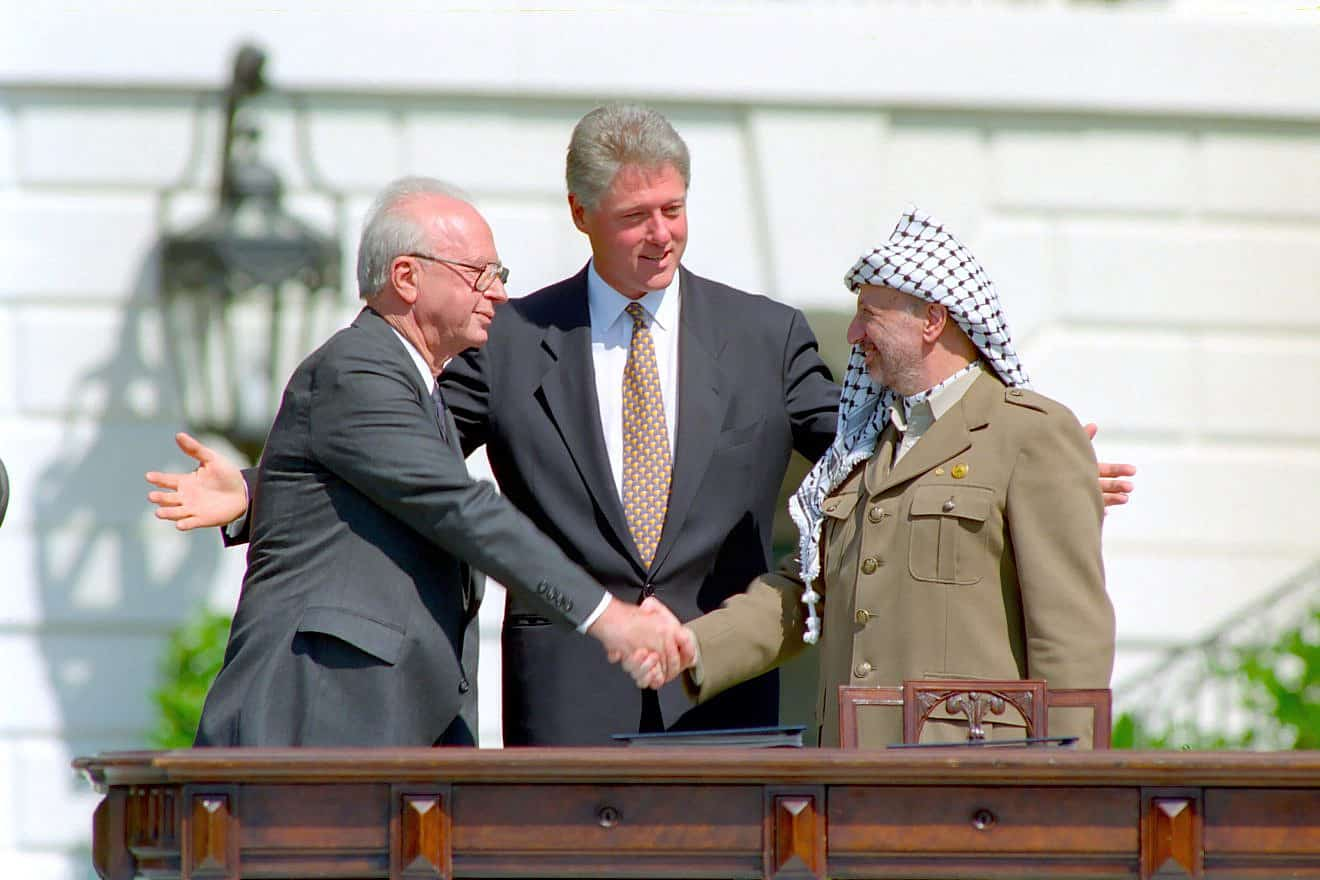
Yitzhak Rabin, Bill Clinton, and Arafat during the Oslo Accords on 13 September 1993

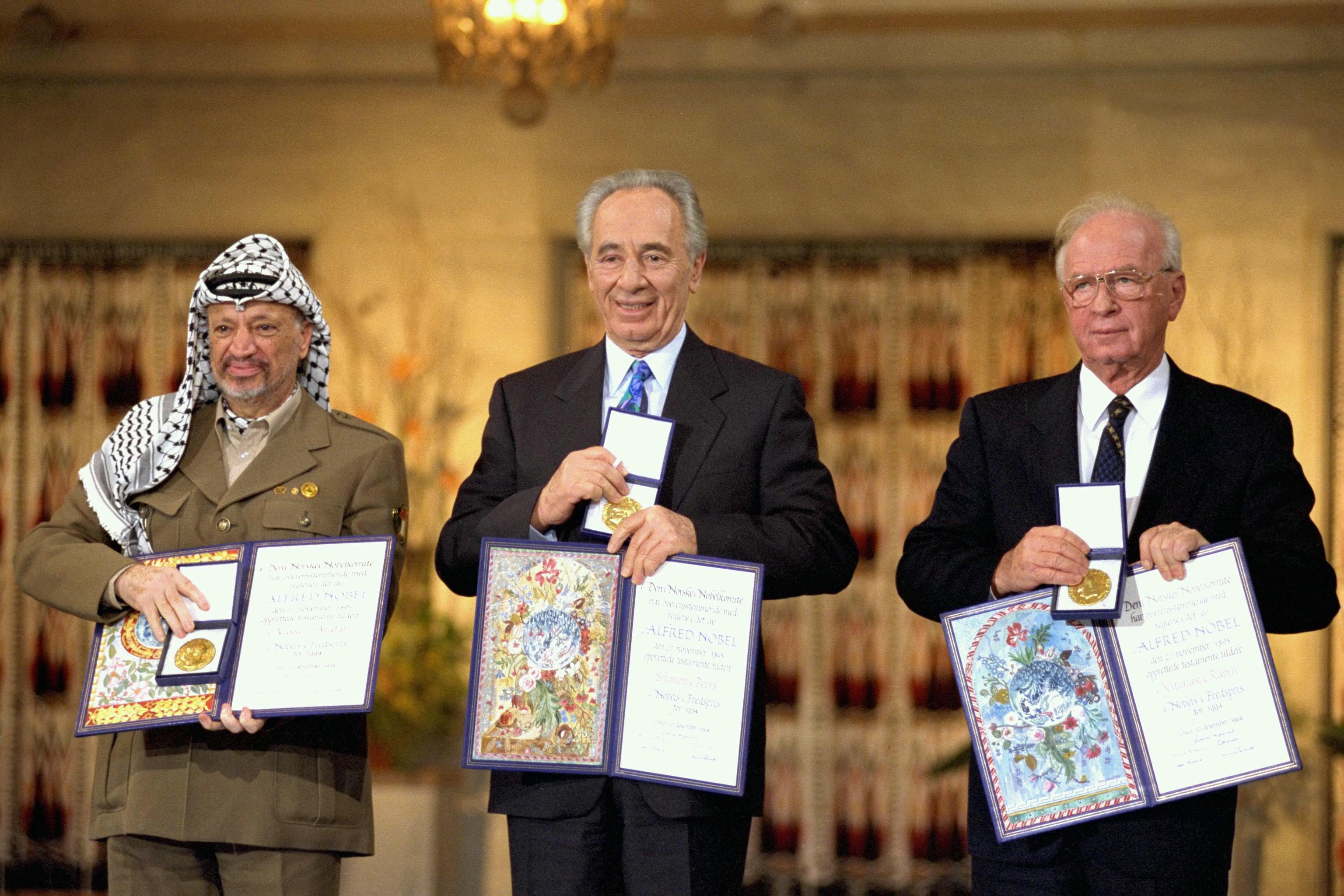
Arafat, Shimon Peres and Rabin receiving the Nobel Peace Prize following the Oslo Accords, 10 December 1994

In the early 1990s, Arafat and leading Fatah officials engaged the Israeli government in a series of secret talks and negotiations that led to the 1993 Oslo Accords. The agreement called for the implementation of Palestinian self-rule in portions of the West Bank and Gaza Strip over a five-year period, along with an immediate halt to and gradual removal of Israeli settlements in those areas. The accords called for a Palestinian police force to be formed from local recruits and Palestinians abroad, to patrol areas of self-rule. Authority over the various fields of rule, including education and culture, social welfare, direct taxation and tourism, would be transferred to the Palestinian interim government. Both parties agreed also on forming a committee that would establish cooperation and coordination dealing with specific economic sectors, including utilities, industry, trade and communication.

Prior to signing the accords, Arafat—as Chairman of the PLO and its official representative—signed two letters renouncing violence and officially recognizing Israel. In return, Prime Minister Yitzhak Rabin, on behalf of Israel, officially recognized the PLO. The following year, Arafat and Rabin were awarded the Nobel Peace Prize, along with Shimon Peres. The Palestinian reaction was mixed. The Rejectionist Front of the PLO allied itself with Islamists in a common opposition against the agreements. It was rejected also by Palestinian refugees in Lebanon, Syria, and Jordan as well as by many Palestinian intellectuals and the local leadership of the Palestinian territories. However, the inhabitants of the territories generally accepted the agreements and Arafat's promise for peace and economic well-being.

=== Establishing authority in the territories ===
In accordance with the terms of the Oslo agreement, Arafat was required to implement PLO authority in the West Bank and Gaza Strip. He insisted that financial support was imperative to establishing this authority and needed it to secure the acceptance of the agreements by the Palestinians living in those areas. However, Arab states of the Persian Gulf—Arafat's usual source for financial backing—still refused to provide him and the PLO with any major donations for siding with Iraq during the 1991 Gulf War. Ahmed Qurei—a key Fatah negotiator during the negotiations in Oslo—publicly announced that the PLO was bankrupt.

In 1994, Arafat moved to Gaza City, which was controlled by the Palestinian National Authority (PNA)—the provisional entity created by the Oslo Accords. Arafat became the President and Prime Minister of the PNA, the Commander of the PLA and the Speaker of the PLC. In July, after the PNA was declared the official government of the Palestinians, the Basic Laws of the Palestinian National Authority was published, in three different versions by the PLO. Arafat proceeded with creating a structure for the PNA. He established an executive committee or cabinet composed of twenty members. Arafat also replaced and assigned mayors and city councils for major cities such as Gaza and Nablus. He began subordinating non-governmental organizations that worked in education, health, and social affairs under his authority by replacing their elected leaders and directors with PNA officials loyal to him. He then appointed himself chairman of the Palestinian financial organization that was created by the World Bank to control most aid money towards helping the new Palestinian entity.

Arafat appointed Moshe Hirsch as the Minister of Jewish Affairs in 1995. Arafat established a Palestinian police force, named the Preventive Security Service (PSS), that became active on 13 May 1994. It was mainly composed of PLA soldiers and foreign Palestinian volunteers. Arafat assigned Mohammed Dahlan and Jibril Rajoub to head the PSS. Amnesty International accused Arafat and the PNA leadership of failing to adequately investigate abuses by the PSS (including torture and unlawful killings) against political opponents and dissidents as well as the arrests of human rights activists.

Throughout November and December 1995, Arafat toured dozens of Palestinian cities and towns that were evacuated by Israeli forces including Jenin, Ramallah, al-Bireh, Nablus, Qalqilyah and Tulkarm, declaring them "liberated". The PNA also gained control of the West Bank's postal service during this period. On 20 January 1996, Arafat was elected president of the PNA, with an overwhelming 88.2 percent majority (the other candidate was charity organizer Samiha Khalil). However, because Hamas, the DFLP and other popular opposition movements chose to boycott the presidential elections, the choices were limited. Arafat's landslide victory guaranteed Fatah 51 of the 88 seats in the PLC. After Arafat was elected to the post of President of the PNA, he was often referred to as the Ra'is, (literally president in Arabic), although he spoke of himself as "the general". In 1997, the PLC accused the executive branch of the PNA of financial mismanagement causing the resignation of four members of Arafat's cabinet. Arafat refused to resign his post.

=== Other peace agreements ===
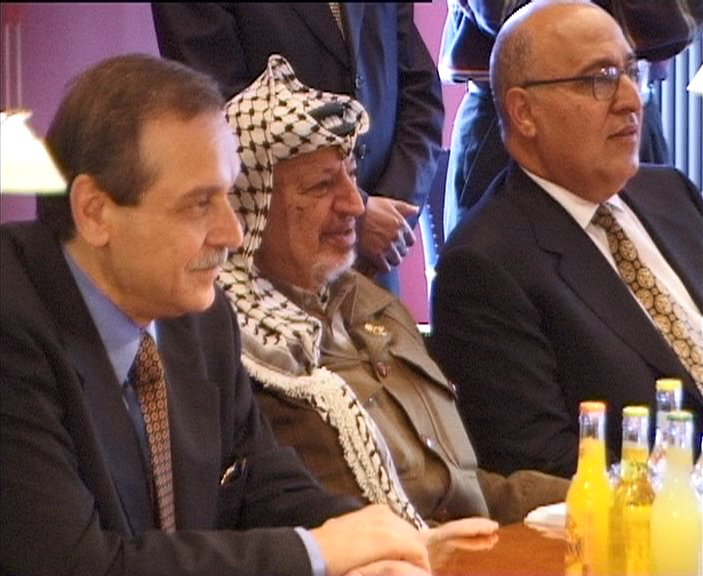
Arafat with PNA cabinet members Yasser Abed Rabbo (left) and Nabil Shaath (right) at a meeting in Copenhagen, 1999

In mid-1996, Benjamin Netanyahu was elected Prime Minister of Israel. Palestinian-Israeli relations grew even more hostile as a result of continued conflict. Despite the Israel-PLO accord, Netanyahu opposed the idea of Palestinian statehood. In 1998, US President Bill Clinton persuaded the two leaders to meet. The resulting Wye River Memorandum detailed the steps to be taken by the Israeli government and PNA to complete the peace process.

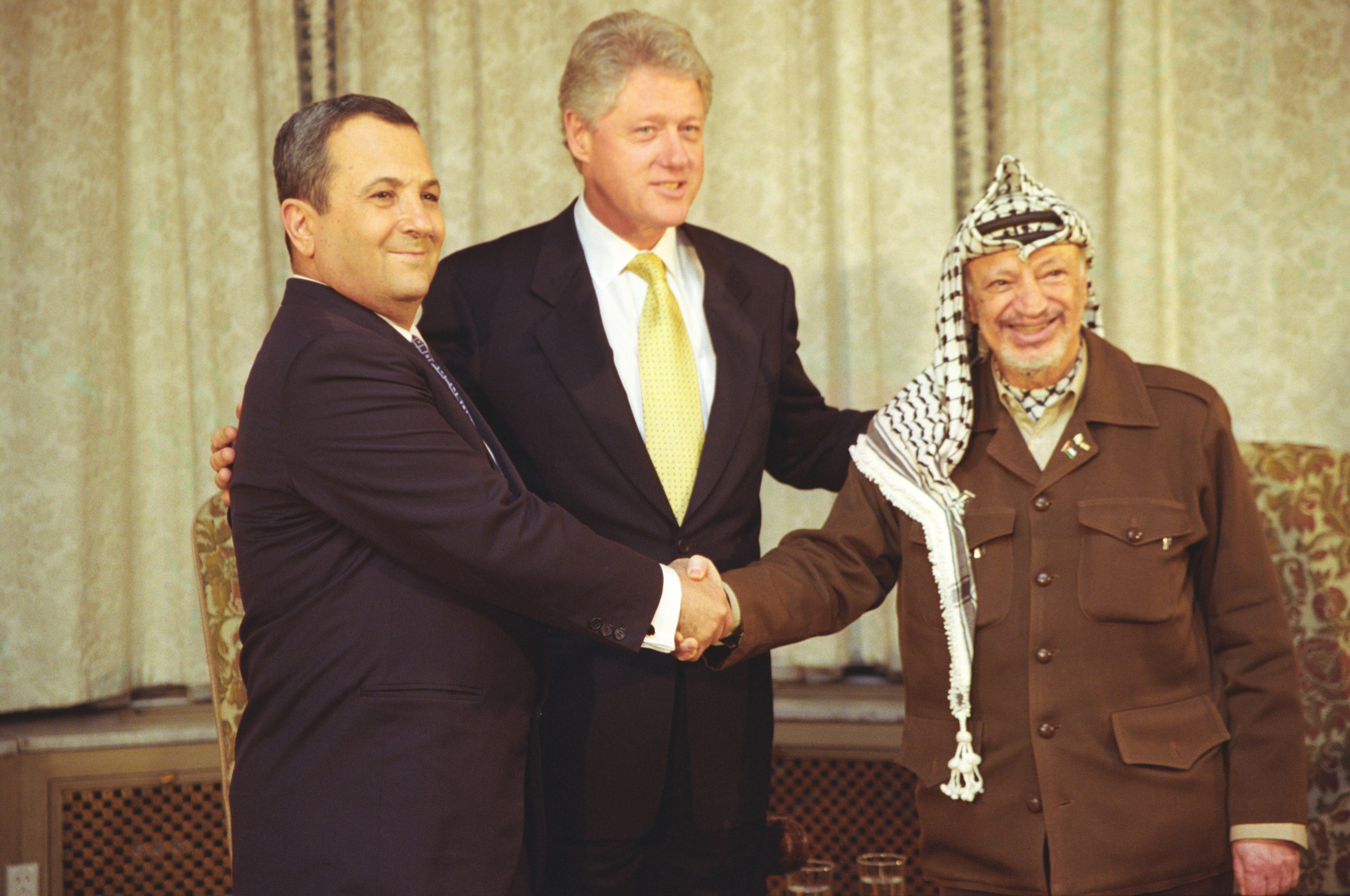
Arafat with Ehud Barak and Bill Clinton at the Camp David Summit, 2000

Arafat continued negotiations with Netanyahu's successor, Ehud Barak, at the Camp David 2000 Summit in July 2000. Due partly to his own politics (Barak was from the leftist Labor Party, whereas Netanyahu was from the rightist Likud Party) and partly due to insistence for compromise by President Clinton, Barak offered Arafat a Palestinian state in 73 percent of the West Bank and all of the Gaza Strip. The Palestinian percentage of sovereignty would extend to 90 percent over a ten- to twenty-five-year period. Also included in the offer was the return of a small number of refugees and compensation for those not allowed to return. Palestinians would also have "custodianship" over Al-Aqsa, sovereignty on all Islamic and Christian holy sites, and three of Jerusalem's four Old City quarters. Arafat rejected Barak's offer and refused to make an immediate counter-offer. He told President Clinton that, "the Arab leader who would surrender Jerusalem is not born yet."

After the September 2000 outbreak of the Second Intifada, negotiations continued at the Taba summit in January 2001; this time, Ehud Barak pulled out of the talks to campaign in the Israeli elections. In October and December 2001, suicide bombings by Palestinian militant groups increased and Israeli counter strikes intensified. Following the election of Ariel Sharon in February, the peace process took a steep downfall. Palestinian elections scheduled for January 2002 were postponed—the stated reason was an inability to campaign due to the emergency conditions imposed by the Intifada, as well as IDF incursions and restrictions on freedom of movement in the Palestinian territories. In the same month, Sharon ordered Arafat to be confined to his Mukata'a headquarters in Ramallah, following an attack in the Israeli city of Hadera; US President George W. Bush supported Sharon's action, claiming that Arafat was "an obstacle to the peace".

== Political survival ==
Footage of Arafat speaking and meeting international leaders

Arafat's long personal and political survival was taken by most Western commentators as a sign of his mastery of asymmetric warfare and his skill as a tactician, given the extremely dangerous nature of politics of the Middle East and the frequency of assassinations. Some commentators believe his survival was largely due to Israel's fear that he could become a martyr for the Palestinian cause if he were assassinated or even arrested by Israel. Others believe that Israel refrained from taking action against Arafat because it feared Arafat less than Hamas and the other Islamist movements gaining support over Fatah. The complex and fragile web of relations between the US, Israel, Saudi Arabia, and other Arab states contributed also to Arafat's longevity as the leader of the Palestinians.

Israel attempted to assassinate Arafat on a number of occasions, but has never used its own agents, preferring instead to "turn" Palestinians close to the intended target, usually using blackmail. According to Alan Hart, the Mossad's specialty is poison. According to Abu Iyad, two attempts were made on Arafat's life by the Israeli Mossad and the Military Directorate in 1970. In 1976, Abu Sa'ed, a Palestinian agent working for the Mossad, was enlisted in a plot to put poison pellets that looked like grains of rice in Arafat's food. Abu Iyad explains that Abu Sa'ed confessed after he received the order to go ahead, explaining that he was unable to go through with the plot because, "He was first of all a Palestinian and his conscience wouldn't let him do it." Arafat claimed in a 1988 interview with Time that because of his fear of assassination by the Israelis, he never slept in the same place two nights in a row.

=== Relations with Hamas and other militant groups ===
Arafat's ability to adapt to new tactical and political situations was perhaps tested by the rise of the Hamas and PIJ organizations, Islamist groups espousing rejectionist policies with Israel. These groups often bombed non-military targets, such as malls and movie theaters, to increase the psychological damage and civilian casualties. In the 1990s, these groups seemed to threaten Arafat's capacity to hold together a unified nationalist organization with a goal of statehood.

An attack carried out by Hamas militants in March 2002 killed 29 Israeli civilians celebrating Passover, including many senior citizens. In response, Israel launched Operation Defensive Shield, a major military offensive into major West Bank cities. Mahmoud al-Zahar, a Hamas leader in Gaza, stated in September 2010 that Arafat had instructed Hamas to launch what he termed "military operations" against Israel in 2000 when Arafat felt that negotiations with Israel would not succeed.

Some Israeli government officials opined in 2002 that the armed Fatah sub-group al-Aqsa Martyrs' Brigades commenced attacks towards Israel in order to compete with Hamas. On 6 May 2002, the Israeli government released a report, based in part on documents, allegedly captured during the Israeli raid of Arafat's Ramallah headquarters, which allegedly included copies of papers signed by Arafat authorizing funding for al-Aqsa Martyrs Brigades' activities. The report implicated Arafat in the "planning and execution of terror attacks".

=== Attempts to marginalize ===
Persistent attempts by the Israeli government to identify another Palestinian leader to represent the Palestinian people failed. Arafat was enjoying the support of groups that, given his own history, would normally have been quite wary of dealing with or supporting him. Marwan Barghouti (a leader of al-Aqsa Martyrs Brigades) emerged as a possible replacement during the Second Intifada, but Israel had him arrested for allegedly being involved in the killing of twenty-six civilians, and he was sentenced to five life terms.

Arafat was finally allowed to leave his compound on 2 May 2002 after intense negotiations led to a settlement: six PFLP militants, including the organization's secretary-general Ahmad Sa'adat, wanted by Israel, who had been holed up with Arafat in his compound, would be transferred to international custody in Jericho. After the wanted men were handed over the siege was lifted. With that, and a promise that he would issue a call to the Palestinians to halt attacks on Israelis, Arafat was released. He issued such a call on 8 May. On 19 September 2002, the IDF largely demolished the compound with armored bulldozers in order to isolate Arafat. In March 2003, Arafat ceded his post as Prime Minister to Mahmoud Abbas amid pressures by the US.

The Israeli security Cabinet on 11 September 2003 decided that "Israel will act to remove this obstacle [Arafat] in the manner, at the time, and in the ways that will be decided on separately". Israeli Cabinet members and officials hinted on Arafat's death, the Israeli military had begun making preparations for Arafat's possible expulsion in the near future, and many feared for his life. Israeli peace activists of Gush Shalom, Knesset members and others went into the Presidential Compound prepared to serve as a human shield. The compound remained under siege until Arafat's transfer to a French hospital, shortly before his death.

In 2004, President Bush dismissed Arafat as a negotiating partner, saying he had "failed as a leader", and accused him of undercutting Abbas when he was prime minister (Abbas resigned the same year he was given the position). Arafat had a mixed relationship with the leaders of other Arab nations. His support from Arab leaders tended to increase whenever he was pressured by Israel; for example, when Israel declared in 2003 it had made the decision, in principle, to remove him from the Israeli-controlled West Bank. In an interview with the Arabic news network Al Jazeera, Arafat responded to Ariel Sharon's suggestion that he be exiled from the Palestinian territories permanently, by stating, "Is it his [Sharon's] homeland or ours? We were planted here before the Prophet Abraham came, but it looks like they [Israelis] don't understand history or geography."

== Financial dealings ==
Under the Oslo Peace Accords, Israel undertook to deposit the VAT tax receipts on goods purchased by Palestinians into the Palestinian treasury. Until 2000, these monies were transferred directly to Arafat's personal accounts at Bank Leumi, in Tel Aviv.

In August 2002, the Israeli Military Intelligence Chief alleged that Arafat's personal wealth was in the range of US$1.3 billion. In 2003 the International Monetary Fund (IMF) conducted an audit of the PNA and stated that Arafat had diverted $900 million in public funds to a special bank account controlled by himself and the PNA Chief Economic Financial adviser. However, the IMF did not claim that there were any improprieties, and it specifically stated that most of the funds had been used to invest in Palestinian assets, both internally and abroad.

However, in 2003, a team of American accountants—hired by Arafat's own finance ministry—began examining Arafat's finances. In its conclusions, the team claimed that part of the Palestinian leader's wealth was in a secret portfolio worth close to $1 billion, with investments in companies like a Coca-Cola bottling plant in Ramallah, a Tunisian cell phone company and venture capital funds in the U.S. and the Cayman Islands. The head of the investigation stated that "although the money for the portfolio came from public funds like Palestinian taxes, virtually none of it was used for the Palestinian people; it was all controlled by Arafat. And none of these dealings were made public." An investigation conducted by the United States Government Accounting Office reported that Arafat and the PLO held over $10 billion in assets even at the time when he was publicly claiming bankruptcy.

Although Arafat lived a modest lifestyle, Dennis Ross, former Middle East negotiator for Presidents George H.W. Bush and Bill Clinton, stated that Arafat's "walking-around money" financed a vast patronage system known as neopatrimonialism. According to Salam Fayyad—a former World Bank official whom Arafat appointed Finance Minister of the PNA in 2002—Arafat's commodity monopolies could accurately be seen as gouging his own people, "especially in Gaza which is poorer, which is something that is totally unacceptable and immoral." Fayyad claims that Arafat used $20 million from public funds to pay the leadership of the PNA security forces (the Preventive Security Service) alone.

Fuad Shubaki, former financial aide to Arafat, told the Israeli security service Shin Bet that Arafat used several million dollars of aid money to buy weapons and support militant groups. During Israel's Operation Defensive Shield, the Israel army recovered counterfeit money and documents from Arafat's Ramallah headquarters. The documents showed that, in 2001, Arafat personally approved payments to Tanzim militants. The Palestinians claimed that the counterfeit money was confiscated from criminal elements.

== Illness and death ==
=== Unsuccessful Israeli assassination attempts ===
The Israeli government tried for decades to assassinate Arafat, including attempting to intercept and shoot down private aircraft and commercial airliners on which he was believed to be traveling. The assassination was initially assigned to Caesarea, the Mossad unit in charge of Israel's numerous targeted killings. Shooting down a commercial airliner in international airspace over very deep water was thought to be preferable to make recovery of the wreckage, and hence investigation, more difficult. Following Israel's 1982 invasion of Lebanon, Israeli minister of defense Ariel Sharon created a special task force code named "Salt Fish" headed by special operations experts Meir Dagan and Rafi Eitan to track Arafat's movements in Lebanon to kill him because Sharon saw Arafat as a "Jew murderer" and an important symbol, symbols being as important as body counts in a war against a terrorist organization. The Salt Fish task force orchestrated the bombing of buildings where Arafat and senior PLO leaders were believed to be staying. Later renamed "Operation Goldfish", Israeli operatives followed Israeli journalist Uri Avnery to a meeting with Arafat in an additional unsuccessful attempt to kill him. In 2001, Sharon as prime minister is believed to have made a commitment to cease attempts to assassinate Arafat. However, following Israel's successful assassination in March 2004 of Sheikh Ahmed Yassin, a founder of the Hamas movement, Sharon stated in April 2004 that "this commitment of mine no longer exists".

=== Failing health ===
The first reports of Arafat's failing health by his doctors for what his spokesman said was influenza came on 25 October 2004, after he vomited during a staff meeting. His condition deteriorated in the following days. Following visits by other doctors, including teams from Tunisia, Jordan, and Egypt—and agreement by Israel to allow him to travel—Arafat was flown from Ramallah to Jordan by a Jordanian military helicopter and from there to France on a French military plane. He was admitted to the Percy military hospital in Clamart, a suburb of Paris. On 3 November, he had lapsed into a gradually deepening coma.

Arafat was pronounced dead at 03:30 UTC on 11 November 2004 at the age of 75 of what French doctors called a massive hemorrhagic cerebrovascular accident (hemorrhagic stroke). Initially, Arafat's medical records were withheld by senior Palestinian officials, and Arafat's wife refused an autopsy believing that it went against Muslim practices. French doctors also said that Arafat suffered from a blood condition known as disseminated intravascular coagulation, although it is inconclusive what brought about the condition. When Arafat's death was announced, the Palestinian people went into a state of mourning, with Qur'anic mourning prayers emitted from mosque loudspeakers throughout the West Bank and the Gaza Strip, and tires burned in the streets. The Palestinian Authority and refugee camps in Lebanon declared 40 days of mourning.

=== Funeral ===
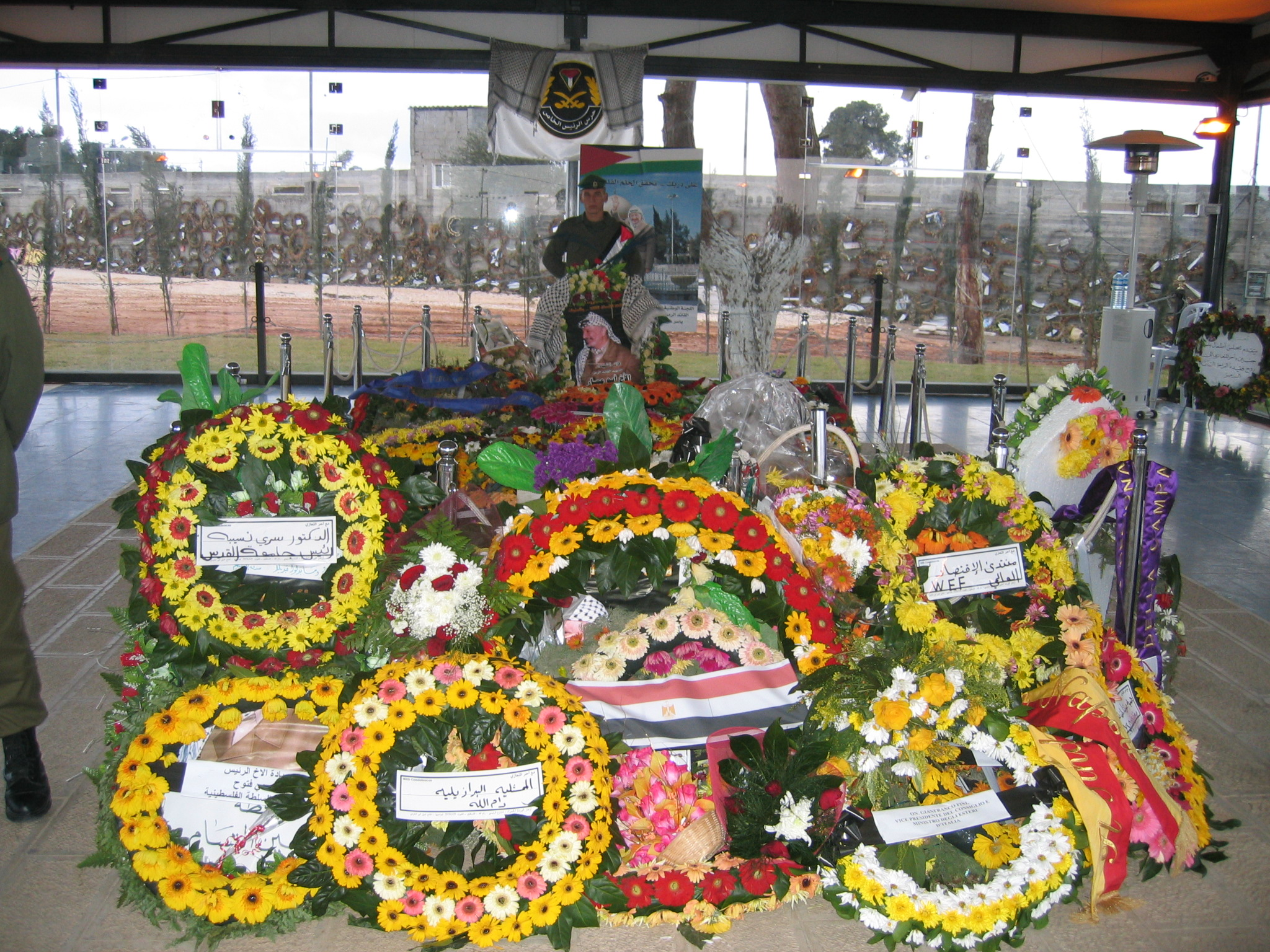
Arafat's "temporary" tomb in Ramallah, 2004

On 11 November 2004, a French Army guard of honour held a brief ceremony for Arafat, with his coffin draped in a Palestinian flag. A military band played the French and Palestinian national anthems, and a Chopin funeral march. French President Jacques Chirac stood alone beside Arafat's coffin for about ten minutes in a last show of respect for Arafat, whom he hailed as "a man of courage". The next day, Arafat's body was flown from Paris aboard a French Air Force transport plane to Cairo, Egypt, for a brief military funeral there, attended by several heads of states, prime ministers and foreign ministers. Egypt's top Muslim cleric Sayed Tantawi led mourning prayers preceding the funeral procession.

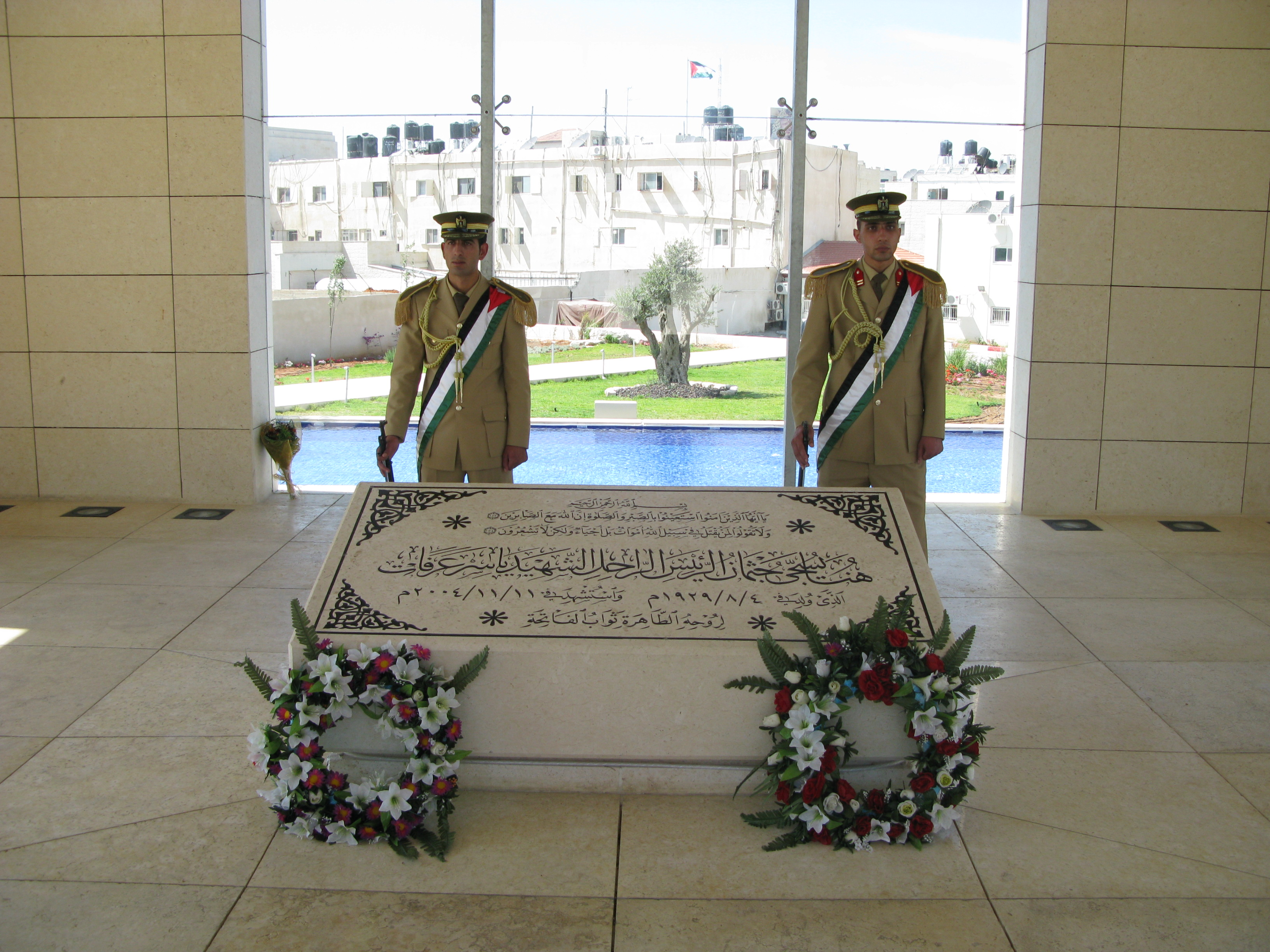
Honour guard at attention over Yasser Arafat's tombstone in mausoleum, opened 10 November 2007 at the PNA presidential headquarters in Ramallah

Israel refused Arafat's wish to be buried near the Masjid Al-Aqsa or anywhere in Jerusalem, citing security concerns. Israel also feared that his burial would strengthen Palestinian claims to East Jerusalem. Following the Cairo procession, Arafat was "temporarily" buried within the Mukataa in Ramallah; tens of thousands of Palestinians attended the ceremony. Arafat was buried in a stone, rather than wooden, coffin, and Palestinian spokesman Saeb Erekat said that Arafat would be reburied in East Jerusalem following the establishment of a Palestinian state. After Sheikh Taissir Tamimi discovered that Arafat was buried improperly and in a coffin—which is not in accordance with Islamic law—Arafat was reburied on the morning of 13 November at around 3:00 am. On 10 November 2007, prior to the third anniversary of Arafat's death, President Mahmoud Abbas unveiled a mausoleum for Arafat near his tomb in commemoration of him.

=== Theories about the cause of death ===
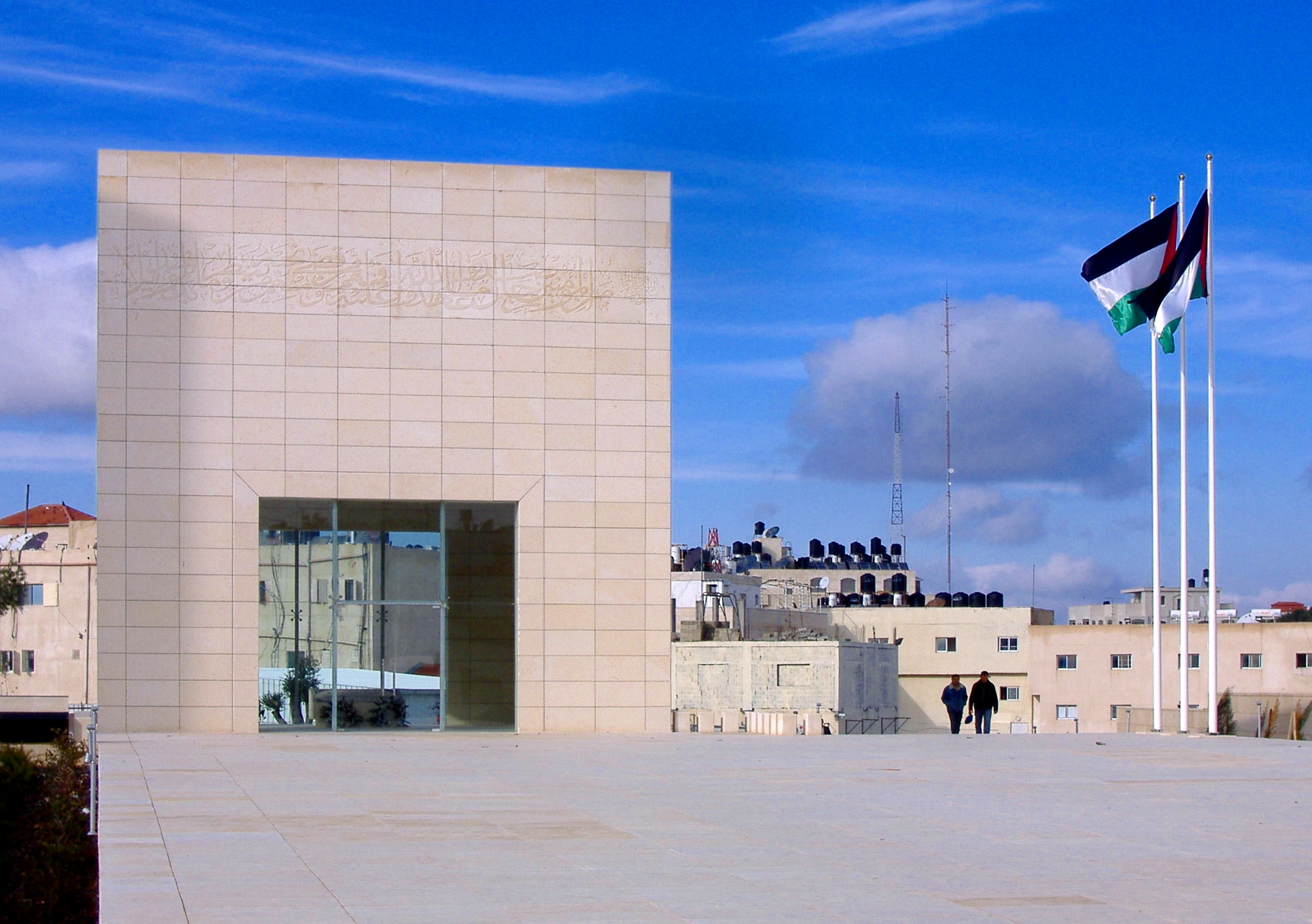
Arafat mausoleum

Numerous theories have circulated regarding Arafat's death, with the most prominent being poisoning (possibly by polonium) and AIDS-related illnesses, as well as liver disease or a platelet disorder.

In September 2005, an Israeli AIDS expert claimed that Arafat bore all the symptoms of AIDS based on obtained medical records. But others, including Patrice Mangin of the University of Lausanne and The New York Times, disagreed with this claim, insisting that Arafat's record indicated that it was highly unlikely that the cause of his death was AIDS. Arafat's personal doctor Ashraf al-Kurdi and aide Bassam Abu Sharif maintained that Arafat was poisoned, possibly by thallium. A senior Israeli physician concluded that Arafat died from food poisoning. Both Israeli and Palestinian officials have denied claims that Arafat was poisoned. Palestinian foreign minister Nabil Shaath ruled out poisoning after talks with Arafat's French doctors.

On 4 July 2012, Al Jazeera published the results of a nine-month investigation, which found that rumors Arafat had died of cancer, cirrhosis, or AIDS were not true, because he was in good health until he fell ill suddenly on 12 October 2004 – but revealed that tests carried out by Swiss experts found traces of polonium in quantities much higher than could occur naturally on Arafat's personal belongings. On 12 October 2013, the British medical journal The Lancet published a peer-reviewed article by the Swiss experts about the analysis of the 38 samples of Arafat's clothes and belongings and 37 reference samples which were known to be polonium-free, suggesting that Arafat could have died of polonium poisoning.

On 27 November 2012, three teams of international investigators, a French, a Swiss, and a Russian team, collected samples from Arafat's body and the surrounding soil in the mausoleum in Ramallah, to carry out an investigation independently from each other.

On 6 November 2013, Al Jazeera reported that the Swiss forensic team had found levels of polonium in Arafat's ribs and pelvis 18 to 36 times the average, even though by this point in time the amount had diminished by a factor of 2 million. François Bochud, the head of the Swiss team, said that the poisoning hypothesis by polonium is "reasonably supported", while forensic scientist Dave Barclay, retained by Al Jazeera, stated, "In my opinion, it is absolutely certain that the cause of his illness was polonium poisoning. ... What we have got is the smoking gun – the thing that caused his illness and was given to him with malice." Derek Hill, a professor in radiological science at University College London who was not involved in the investigation, said "I would say it's clearly not overwhelming proof, and there is a risk of contamination (of the samples), but it is a pretty strong signal. ... It seems likely what they're doing is putting a very cautious interpretation of strong data."

But on 26 December 2013, a team of Russian scientists released a report saying they had found no trace of radioactive poisoning—a finding that came after the French report found traces of polonium. Vladimir Uiba, the head of the Federal Medical and Biological Agency, said that Arafat died of natural causes and the agency had no plans to conduct further tests. Unlike the Swiss report, the French and Russian reports were not made public at the time. The Swiss experts read the French and Russian reports and argued that the radiologic data measured by the other teams supported their conclusions of a probable death by polonium poisoning. In March 2015, a French prosecutor closed a 2012 French inquiry, stating that French experts maintained that the polonium and lead traces found were of an environmental nature. Palestinian official Wasel Abu Yousef said of the 2013 report, "The French report is politicized and is contrary to all the evidence which confirms that the president was killed by poisoning", and "This report is an attempt to cover up what happened in Percy hospital."

== Legacy ==
Places named in his honor include:

- Martyr Yasser Arafat Governmental Hospital
- Yasser Arafat Cup
- Yasser Arafat International Airport

== See also ==
- Politics of Palestine
- List of international trips made by Yasser Arafat
- List of Fatah members
- Arafat's Johannesburg Address

== Notes ==
Political offices
Preceded by Yahya Hammuda	Chairman of the Palestine Liberation Organization; 1969–2004	Succeeded by Mahmoud Abbas
Vacant Title last held by Amin al-Husseini	President of Palestine; 1989–2004	Succeeded by Rawhi Fattouh; Acting
Vacant Title last held by Amin al-Husseini as President of Palestine	President of the Palestinian National Authority; 1994–2004	Succeeded by Rawhi Fattouh; Acting
