= Palestine Academy for Science and Technology =

- Abbreviation: PALAST
- Formation: 1997
- Headquarters: East Jerusalem
- Region served: Palestine

The Palestine Academy for Science and Technology (PALAST) is an academy of science headquartered in East Jerusalem, with branches in Ramallah and Gaza City, Palestine. It was founded in 1997.
