= PLO's Ten Point Program =

1974 Palestine Liberation Organization plan in the Israeli–Palestinian conflict

PLO's Ten Point Program (in Arabic: برنامج النقاط العشر) (called PLO's Phased Plan by the Israeli government) is the 1974 plan accepted by the Palestine Liberation Organization (PLO) to outline its position on the Israeli–Palestinian conflict. It reiterated the group's previous policies with a plan to implement them gradually. PLO's Ten Point Program was criticized by hard-line factions within the PLO, and they formed the Rejectionist Front to join in opposition. The Israeli government alleged that the program was a way for the PLO to make territorial gains toward Israel. The program remains in effect, but it has not been a significant part of the PLO's operation since the 1980s.

== History ==
The PLO's Ten Point Program was developed by the Palestinian National Council (PNC), the legislative body of the Palestine Liberation Organization (PLO), following the Yom Kippur War when Egypt and Syria were unable to defeat Israel.

== Specifics ==
The PLO's Ten Point Program called for the establishment of a national authority "over every part of Palestinian territory that is liberated" with the aim of "completing the liberation of all Palestinian territory". The program implied that the liberation of Palestine may be partial (at least, at some stage), and though it emphasized armed struggle, it did not exclude other means. This allowed the PLO to engage in diplomatic channels, and provided validation for future compromises made by the Palestinian leadership. It was accepted at the PLO's 12th meeting, held in Cairo on 8 June 1974.

The PLO's Ten Point Program repeated the principles of the policies which the Palestinian National Council had accepted in the past:

- the denial of United Nations Security Council Resolution 242 (adopted after the Six-Day War)
- the denial of the existence of the State of Israel
- the demand of the return of all Palestinian refugees to their original homes
- the establishment of an Arab-Palestinian state in the entire region of Palestine within the pre-1948 borders.

It added to the PLO's previous policies by asserting that each step which would lead to the fulfillment of these goals would be a worthy step. It also stated that any territory, from the region of Palestine, which would be transferred to an Arab rule should be transferred to Palestinian control, also if the takeover of other territories would be delayed as a result.

== Reactions ==
The hard-line factions of the PLO formed the Rejectionist Front in opposition to the Ten Point Program, primarily because they worried that it could potentially lead to a peace agreement with Israel. The largest faction to join was the Popular Front for the Liberation of Palestine (PFLP), the second largest faction in the PLO after Fatah. The Rejectionist Front acted independently of the PLO over the following years, creating an ongoing rift that has led to paralysis or conflicting courses of action within the organization. Some interpreted these series of decisions as a realization by the PLO that it can not fulfill all its goals at once, but rather it would be able to do so in gradual small steps, and as a recognition of the council in the possibility of initiating political and diplomatic measures and not just an "armed struggle", although PLO's Ten Point Program does not consist of a denial of the use of an armed struggle.

The Israeli government called the program the PLO's Step/stage Program or PLO's Phased Plan (Tokhnit HaSHlavim or Torat HaSHlavim). It opposed the program, alleging that it implied the PLO would not honor any future compromise agreement between Israel and the Palestinians. It raised the fear among Israelis that the Palestinians may exploit future Israeli territorial compromises to strengthen its ability to attack Israel. Large parts of the Israeli public and the Israeli leadership were concerned that Palestinians' willingness to compromise during negotiations was cover for implementing the Ten Point Program. When the Oslo Accords were signed, many Israeli right-wing politicians openly claimed that this was part of the ploy to implement the Ten Point Program. According to the Israeli Ministry of Foreign Affairs, the Palestinian leadership asserted that the Oslo Accords are part of the Ten Point Program.

The Ten Point Program was never officially dissolved, but reference to it by the Palestinian leadership has declined since the 1980s. There is a debate within Israel on whether the Ten Point Program still represents the thinking and official policy of certain factions within the Palestinian leadership and of the Palestinian people.
